= List of crossings of the River Calder, West Yorkshire =

This is a list of current bridges and other crossings of the River Calder.

== Crossings ==
Crossing	Carries	Location	Coordinates	Photo
=== Hebden Bridge - Sowerby Bridge ===
Black Pits Aqueduct	Rochdale Canal	Hebden Bridge	53.7403°N 2.0152°W	Black Pits Canal Aqueduct
Victoria Bridge	Station Road	Hebden Bridge	53.7386°N 2.0094°W	
Crows Nest Bridge	Pedestrian	Hebden Bridge	53.738°N 2.0078°W	Crow Nest Bridge
Carr Lane Bridge	Road		53.7345°N 1.9971°W	Upstream side of Carr Lane bridge
Hawks Clough Bridge	Pedestrian	Mytholmroyd	53.7335°N 1.9912°W	Hawks_Clough_Bridge_-_geograph.org.uk_-_7251081
Caldene Bridge	Road	Mytholmroyd	53.7311°N 1.9842°W	
Mytholmroyd Bridge	Road	Mytholmroyd	53.7304°N 1.9824°W	County Bridge, Mytholmroyd
Brearley Bridge	Road	Brearley	53.7298°N 1.9611°W	
Boy Bridge	Road	Luddenden Foot	53.7218°N 1.9460°W	Boy_Bridge,_Luddenden_Foot_-_geograph.org.uk_-_8266257
Fairlea Mill Footbridge	Pedestrian	Luddenden Foot	53.7171°N 1.9425°W	Footbridge over the River Calder at Fairlea Mill, Luddenden Foot
Service Bridge	Road	Luddenden Foot	53.7157°N 1.9426°W	Bridge at site of Cooper House Mills, Luddendenfoot
Footbridge		Tenterfields	53.7123°N 1.9375°W	River_Calder_Footbridge_-_geograph.org.uk_-_7252417
Cycle Bridge	Pennine Cycleway	Sowerby Bridge	53.7114°N 1.9201°W	Bridge over the River Calder
Sowerby Bridge	A58	Sowerby Bridge	53.708°N 1.9121°W	Sowerby_Bridge_-_geograph.org.uk_-_195120
Footbridge		Sowerby Bridge	53.7089°N 1.9082°W	Footbridge_across_the_River_Calder,_Sowerby_Bridge_-_geograph.org.uk_-_703118
Gasworks Bridge		Sowerby Bridge	53.7094°N 1.8999°W	Sowerby Bridge - Gasworks Bridge
Mearclough Bridge	Road	Sowerby Bridge	53.7099°N 1.8954°W	Mearclough Bridge, Sowerby Bridge
Sterne Bridge	Road	Sowerby Bridge	53.7058°N 1.8857°W	Sterne Bridge crossing The River Calder, Sowerby Bridge
Copley Viaduct	Bradford-Halifax Line		53.7015°N 1.8779°W	Locomotives on Copley Bridge
Railway bridge	Caldervale Line		53.7008°N 1.8777°W	Railway bridge over the River Calder, Copley
=== Calderdale, West Yorkshire ===
Copley Bridge (former toll bridge) (collapsed)	North Dean Road	Copley	53.6977°N 1.8734°W	Copley_Bridge,_collapsed,_downstream_side_-_geograph.org.uk_-_4797140
Railway bridge	Caldervale Line		53.6969°N 1.8664°W	
Railway bridge	Caldervale Line		53.6964°N 1.8592°W	
Stainland Road Bridge	B6112		53.6941°N 1.8546°W	Stainland_Road_bridge_arch_over_River_Calder_-_geograph.org.uk_-_7707572
Railway bridge	Caldervale Line		53.6921°N 1.8509°W	Railway_viaduct_crossing_the_Calder_and_Hebble_Navigation_-_geograph.org.uk_-_8272541
Elland Bridge	B6114	Elland	53.6879°N 1.8399°W	Elland_Bridge_-_geograph.org.uk_-_7557647
River Calder Bridge (Elland)	A629	Elland	53.6899°N 1.8346°W	Bridges_old_and_new,_Wistons_Lane,_Elland_-_geograph.org.uk_-_1874302
Railway bridge	Caldervale Line	Elland	53.6902°N 1.8337°W	Railway_bridge_over_the_River_Calder,_Elland_-_geograph.org.uk_-_7558402
Savile Way Bridge	Savile Way	Elland	53.6929°N 1.8308°W	
Bailey Bridge	footpath	Cromwell Bottom	53.6993°N 1.7832°W	Bridges_over_the_River_Calder_at_Cromwell_Bottom_-_geograph.org.uk_-_3321079
Rastrick Bridge	A643	Brighouse	53.6959°N 1.8141°W	Water_main_alongside_Rastrick_Bridge_-_geograph.org.uk_-_3342797
Brighouse Bridge	A641	Brighouse	53.6995°N 1.7792°W	Brighouse Bridge
Blakeborough's Bridge	footpath	Brighouse	53.6974°N 1.7688°W	Bridge over River Calder
=== Kirklees / Calderdale, West Yorkshire ===
Kirklees Viaduct	M62		53.6928°N 1.7564°W	Underneath_the_M62_bridge_-_geograph.org.uk_-_8208289
Railway bridge	Caldervale Line		53.6883°N 1.7408°W	Railway Bridge
Cooper Bridge	A62 (Leeds Road)	Cooper Bridge	53.6819°N 1.7351°W	Cooper Bridge
=== Kirklees, West Yorkshire ===
Railway bridge	Caldervale Line		53.6830°N 1.7268°W	Cooper Bridge Viaduct
Battyeford Footbridge	towpath		53.6837°N 1.7255°W	Battyeford Footbridge over the River Calder
Wood Lane Bridge	Wood Lane	Battyeford	53.6805°N 1.7148°W	Battyeford_Toll_Bridge_-_geograph.org.uk_-_6452877
Mirfield Viaduct	Caldervale Line / Huddersfield Line	Mirfield	53.6725°N 1.6978°W	Calder railway viaduct, Mirfield
Ledgard Bridge	Newgate Street	Mirfield	53.6719°N 1.6976°W	Ledgard Bridge, Mirfield
Hopton New Road Bridge	Hopton New Road	Mirfield	53.6685°N 1.6927°W	
Wheatley's Bridge	Caldervale Line / Huddersfield Line	Mirfield	53.6707°N 1.6776°W	Railway Bridge over the River Calder
access bridge	access road		53.6712°N 1.6767°W	Wheatley's Bridge over River Calder
Steanard Bridge	Steanard Lane		53.6745°N 1.6749°W	Steanard Lane Bridge
Ravensthorpe Road Bridge	Ravensthorpe Road	Ravensthorpe	53.6766°N 1.6589°W	Girder bridge for Calder Road
Railway bridge (disused)	Spen Valley railway	Ravensthorpe	53.6804°N 1.6504°W	
Railway bridge	Caldervale Line / Huddersfield Line	Ravensthorpe	53.6808°N 1.6478°W	Railway Bridge over the River Calder
pipe bridge			53.6807°N 1.6453°W	Pipe bridge across the River Calder
Cleggford Bridge	Thornhill Road		53.6786°N 1.6368°W	Cleggford_Bridge,_Thornhill_Lees,_Dewsbury_-_geograph.org.uk_-_7501836
Mill Street Bridge	Mill Street West	Dewsbury	53.6889°N 1.6347°W	Bridge over the River Calder, Dewsbury
footbridge	footpath	Dewsbury	53.6889°N 1.6328°W	Calder_and_Hebble_Navigation_-_Aldams_Road_-_geograph.org.uk_-_1301390
Saville Road Bridge	Saville Road B6409	Dewsbury	53.6877°N 1.6298°W	
pipe bridge		Dewsbury	53.6839°N 1.6213°W	A pipe crossing the River Calder seen from the Headfield Viaduct, Dewsbury
Headfield Viaduct	Pedestrian	Dewsbury	53.6836°N 1.6214°W	Former Great Northern Railway bridge over the Calder below Earlsheaton
pipe bridge			53.6787°N 1.6156°W	
footbridge	footpath		53.6685°N 1.5929°W	The footbridge over the River Calder at Healey
=== Wakefield - Castleford ===
Railway Bridges	Manchester and Leeds Railway		53.6677°N 1.5928°W	Railway_Bridge_over_the_River_Calder_near_Healey_-_geograph.org.uk_-_113922
Horbury Bridge	A642	Horbury	53.6572°N 1.5774°W	Horbury Bridge over the River Calder
Former Rail Bridge	Pedestrian	Addingford	53.6553°N 1.5626°W	Horbury - old railway bridge at The Strands
Former Rail Bridge	Pedestrian	Addingford	53.6521°N 1.5561°W	Horbury_West_Curve_bridge_over_the_River_Calder_-_geograph.org.uk_-_6184371
River Calder Bridge	Hallam Line		53.6517°N 1.5397°W	Railway bridge over the River Calder
M1 Bridge	Motorway		53.6562°N 1.5288°W	M1 goes over the River Calder
Calder Bridge	A636	Wakefield	53.6632°N 1.5083°W	Road bridge across the Calder
Railway Bridge	99 Arches Viaduct, Wakefield Line	Wakefield	53.6686°N 1.4932°W	Rail Bridge and Viaduct
Hepworth Footbridge		Wakefield	53.6763°N 1.4922°W	Hepworth footbridge
Wakefield Bridge	A61	Wakefield	53.6766°N 1.4903°W	Wakefield New Bridge
Chantry Bridge	Pedestrian/Cycle	Wakefield	53.6766°N 1.4897°W	Mediaeval Bridge
Calder Bridge	Pontefract Line	Wakefield	53.6742°N 1.478°W	Calder Bridge
Neil Fox Way	A6194	Wakefield	53.6752°N 1.4737°W	A6194_Bridge_-_geograph.org.uk_-_6290304
Railway bridge	Hallam Line	Wakefield	53.6826°N 1.4686°W	Railway bridge across the R.Calder (1)
Footbridge	Southern Washlands NR	Wakefield	53.6855°N 1.4667°W	Blue Bridge
Service Bridge	Welbeck Soil Treatment		53.694°N 1.4483°W	Bridge over The River Calder near Newland Hall
Stanley Ferry Aqueducts	Aire and Calder Navigation		53.7025°N 1.4624°W	The old aqueduct of 1838 at Stanley Ferry
Birkwood Road	Road		53.703°N 1.464°W	Pipebridge over the river Calder
M62 Bridge	Motorway		53.7215°N 1.4281°W	M62_crossing_the_River_Calder_-_geograph.org.uk_-_6481930
Railway bridge	Hallam Line	Castleford	53.7209°N 1.4046°W	Railway_Viaduct_over_River_Calder
Stephenson's Bridge	Rail	Castleford	53.7235°N 1.395°W	Railway bridge over the River Calder
Old Rail Bridge	Castleford Greenway	Castleford	53.7246°N 1.3906°W	Breathing new life into an old bridge
Methley Bridge	Barnsdale Road A639	Castleford	53.727°N 1.3806°W	Methley_Bridge_-_geograph.org.uk_-_2163336
== See also ==
- List of crossings of the River Aire
