= Brearley =

Brearley is a surname that may refer to:

- David Brearley (1745–1790), delegate to the U.S. Constitutional Convention.
- Giles Brearley (born 1955), South Yorkshire local historian
- Harry Brearley (1871–1948), British chemist who invented stainless steel
- Herman Brearley (died 1940), English cathedral organist
- Horace Brearley (1913–2007), father of Mike
- Joeli Brearley, British author and activist
- John Brearley (1875–1944), English soccer player
- Jonathan Brearley (born 1973), chief executive officer of Great Britain's energy regulator
- Liam Brearley (born 2003), Canadian snowboarder
- Mike Brearley (born 1942), Middlesex and England cricketer, one of the most successful cricket captains of all time
- Molly Brearley (1905–1994), British educationist, teacher and writer
- Norman Brearley (1890–1989), Australian aviation pioneer
- Roger Brearley (1586–1637), English clergyman
- Walter Brearley (1876–1937), Lancashire fast bowler

== See also ==
- The Brearley School, a K-12 independent school for girls in New York City
- David Brearley High School, Kenilworth, New Jersey
