= Hartshead Moor Top =

Hamlet in West Yorkshire, England

Coordinates: 53.7203°N 1.7485°W

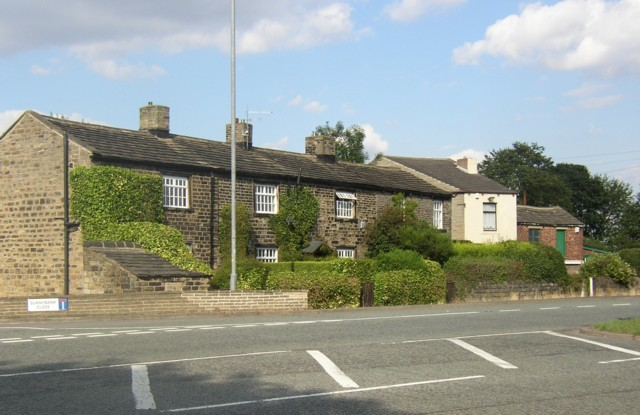
- Houses along Halifax Road

- Location within West Yorkshire
- Metropolitan borough: Kirklees
- Metropolitan county: West Yorkshire
- Region: Yorkshire and the Humber
- Country: England
- Sovereign state: United Kingdom
- Police: West Yorkshire
- Fire: West Yorkshire
- Ambulance: Yorkshire

Hartshead Moor Top is a hamlet in the county of West Yorkshire, England, halfway between Brighouse and Cleckheaton on the A643. It is close to the Hartshead Moor services on the M62 motorway. In 1974 the service station was near the scene of a Provisional Irish Republican Army attack on a coach carrying soldiers and their children, killing twelve. There is a plaque in the entrance to the west-bound section commemorating those who died.

== Governance ==
Hartsead Moor Top is a hamlet in the Cleckheaton ward of Kirklees, a metropolitan borough within the ceremonial county of West Yorkshire in England. It was originally in the parish of Clifton, but was transferred to Spenborough Urban District in 1937.

== Geography ==
Hartshead Moor Top neighbours Scholes to the north, Cleckheaton to the north east, Hartshead Moor Side to the east, Hightown/Liversedge to the south east, Hartshead Moor services to the south and Clifton to the south west. Hartshead Moor services on the M62 is in the neighbouring metropolitan county of Calderdale.

== Sport ==
Hartshead Moor Cricket Club, established in 1876, is based on Highmoor Lane.

Willow Valley Golf is the home of the Yorkshire P.G.A Championship and voted to be amongst the best new courses in the British Isles. This golf course has 36 holes.
