= Blakeborough's Bridge =

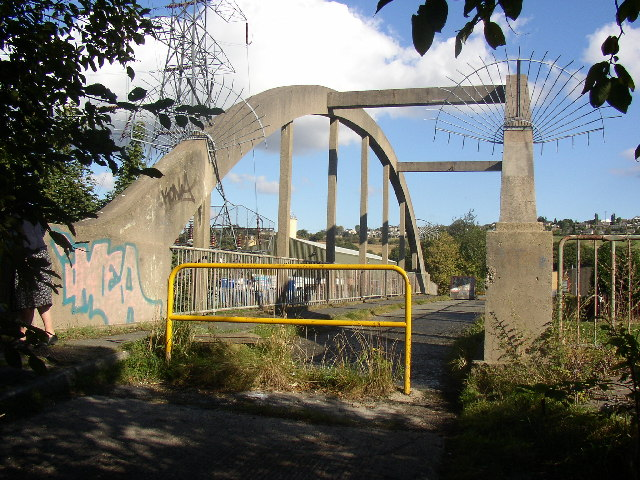
- Coordinates: 53.6974°N 1.7688°W
- Carries: Footpath
- Crosses: River Calder
- Locale: Brighouse, West Yorkshire

Characteristics
- Design: Concrete tied-arch bridge

History
- Opened: 1962
- Closed: c1980

Blakeborough's Bridge crosses the River Calder in Brighouse, West Yorkshire, England. It was built in 1962 to link J. Blakeborough and Sons works and offices that were on different sides of the river.

== History ==
Built in 1962 to link J. Blakeborough and Sons works and offices in Birds Royd and River Street to Sherwood Works on the Armytage Road Industrial Estate. It was closed to vehicles around 1980 after production ceased on the site. A public footpath crosses the bridge.

The Bridge was built to an American specification and not to a British Standard.

== See also ==
- List of crossings of the River Calder
