= Renato Benedetti =

Canadian born and educated architect

- Born: November 1962 (age 63–64)
Further information
Occupation	Architect
Awards
- Practice: Benedetti Architects
- Buildings: BAFTA Headquarters, Piccadilly, London Terni Bridge, Italy; Connock & Lockie, Bloomsbury, London; Eleventh Church, Clerkenwell, London; Brunner Headquarters & Showroom; Scale Lane Footbridge, Hull Castleford Bridge, Yorkshire

Renato Benedetti (born November 1962) is a Canadian-born and educated architect. He studied at the University of Waterloo and has practiced in London since 1989. He founded Benedetti Architects in 2016 following twenty years of partnership with Jonathan McDowell as co-directors of the multi award-winning practice McDowell+Benedetti. Celebrated projects by McDowell+Benedetti include Scale Lane Bridge in Hull and Castleford Bridge in Yorkshire.

Benedetti is a Built Environment Expert for the Design Council, a fellow of the Royal Society of Arts and was a founding committee member of the London Festival of Architecture. He has been a competition judge for the RIBA since 2003 and was chair of the judging panel for The Wall, (Note: "The Wall is a Christian organisation seeking to build a national landmark in the UK. The Wall of Answered Prayer will be an architectural sculpture consisting of a million bricks, each of which will represent a prayer which Jesus has answered.""Home Page". The Wall.) international design competition in 2016. He has judged numerous international awards and was a member of the RSA Art for Architecture Awards panel (1998–2004).

== Education ==
- Bachelor of Environmental Studies (BES), Architecture, University of Waterloo
- Bachelor of Architecture (BArch) University of Waterloo
- RIBA part 3 University of Cambridge

== Significant Buildings ==
- 2014–2020 BAFTA Headquarters, Piccadilly, London
- 2017 Terni Bridge, Italy
- 2017 Connock & Lockie, Bloomsbury, London
- 2015 Eleventh Church, Clerkenwell, London
- 2013 Brunner Headquarters & Showroom
- 2013 Scale Lane Footbridge, Hull
- 2008 Castleford Bridge, Yorkshire

== Practices ==
- 2016 Benedetti Architects
- 1996 McDowell+Benedetti Architects
- 1989 David Chipperfield Architects

== Honours, decorations, awards and distinctions ==
- 2014 World Architecture Festival Transport Award (Scale Lane Bridge)
- 2013 London Borough of Lewisham, Design Review Panel Member
- 2011 London Borough of Wandsworth, Design Review Panel Member and Founding Member
- 2006 World Architecture Festival News Awards Judge
- 2006 London Borough of Southwark, Design Review Panel member

== Teaching ==
- 2009 Visiting professor, Roma Tre University, Department of Architecture
