= Scale Lane Footbridge =

Pedestrian bridge in Hull, England

Scale Lane Footbridge Scale Lane Bridge
- Aerial view showing the "apostrophe-like" appearance of the bridge as it opens
- Coordinates: 53.7424°N 0.3299°W
- OS grid reference: TA 10248 28628

Characteristics
- Material: Steel
- Total length: 53 m (58 yd)
- No. of spans: 2
- Load limit: 1,000 people

History
- Architect: McDowell+Benedetti
- Engineering design by: (Structural) Alan Baxter Ltd.
- Constructed by: Qualter Hall
- Construction start: 2005 (design competition)
- Construction end: 2013
- Construction cost: £7 million
- Inaugurated: 28 June 2013

Statistics
- Daily traffic: Pedestrians and cyclists

Location
- Interactive map of Scale Lane Footbridge

Scale Lane Footbridge is an apostrophe-shaped pedestrian swing bridge in Hull, England. The bridge has a rotating mechanism, allowing it to swing open horizontally, letting vessels pass beneath on the River Hull. It was the first bridge in the world to allow pedestrians to remain on the bridge and ride it while it is in motion.

== Background ==
Planning for the black steel Scale Lane Footbridge began in 2005, and McDowell+Benedetti won a competition. Alan Baxter Ltd was hired as the structural engineer on the project. The bridge officially opened on 28 June 2013. The bridge spans the river between Hull's Old Town and a former industrial section of the city. It was intended to help regeneration of the area and connect the city centre to a planned housing development. It crosses the River Hull, which is connected to the River Humber.

The bridge has space for a restaurant, seating for bridge visitors, and cost £7 million. It was the first in the world to allow people to walk on and off the bridge while it is swinging to open and close.

== Design ==
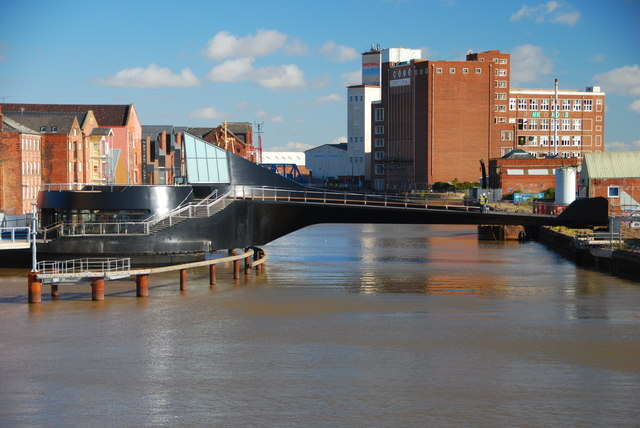
Footbridge Scale Lane Staith to Tower Street

The bridge is cantilevered and it curves upwards to allow small boats to pass beneath and swings open to allow larger boats past. Large gears and electric bevel gears are engaged for the opening and closing mechanism. The main pivot point for the bridge is a 16 m (17 yd) hub. The bridge rotates slowly, allowing pedestrians to remain on the bridge while it is rotating. The design includes a barrier on the eastern side to prevent entry, while on the western side pedestrians can step on and off the bridge while it is in motion. The speed of the bridge opening and closing is 0.15 m (0.16 yd) per second. The bridge weighs 1,000 t (980 long tons; 1,100 short tons) and has a capacity of 1,000 people per crossing. It is 53 m (58 yd) long and the cantilevered portion is 35 m (38 yd) long. The design includes an art installation of text and soundscape by artist Nayan Kulkarni and lighting design by Sutton Vane Associates, which also combine to signal and dramatise the bridge movement. From above, the bridge looks something like an apostrophe, while locals say it looks like the flipper in a pinball game. Rowan Moore in The Guardian said the bridge is not just a way of getting from A to B, but something in itself, an extension of the place and, as well as being a place, it is an event. The bridge allows pedestrians and cyclists, but prohibits motorised vehicles.

== Reception ==
The bridge has earned several awards and has been recognised internationally including the World Festival of Architecture Transport Award, Civic Trust Award for Community Impact & Engagement, and Hull Civic Society Award. Popular Mechanics called it one of the "30 Most Impressive Bridges in the World". The Economic Times included it in a list of "Engineering marvels". The bridge is also featured in the book Britain's Greatest Bridges. The bridge was one of the locations for the 2016 Sea of Hull photographic installation by artist Spencer Tunick.
