= Spencer Tunick =

American photographer

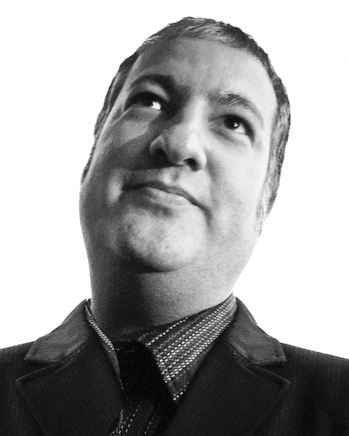
- Tunick in 2011
- Born: Middletown, New York, U.S.
- Known for: Photography
- Website: spencertunick.com

Spencer Tunick is an American photographer best known for organizing large-scale nude shoots.

== Early life and education ==
Spencer Tunick was born in Middletown, Orange County, New York, into a Jewish family, being the fourth generation of photographers. His grandfather was a photographer of high-profile politicians in the United Nations. His father, Earle David Tunick, founded Resort Photo Service, a photography business that photographed private events as well as those of famous politicians, singers, actors, and athletes. His paternal grandmother is a relative of Martin Indyk, the former US ambassador to Israel.

Tunick studied at the New York Military Academy, and later earned a degree in Fine Arts from Emerson College in 1988.

== Photography ==
In 1992, Tunick began documenting live nudes in public locations in New York through video and photographs. His early works from this period focus more on a single nude individual or small groups of nudes. Tunick cites 1994, when he posed and photographed 28 nude people in front of the headquarters of the United Nations in midtown Manhattan, as a turning point in his career; "It all started there, moving my work from just photography into installation and performance photography," he says. Between 1994 and 2011, he photographed over 75 human installations around the world.

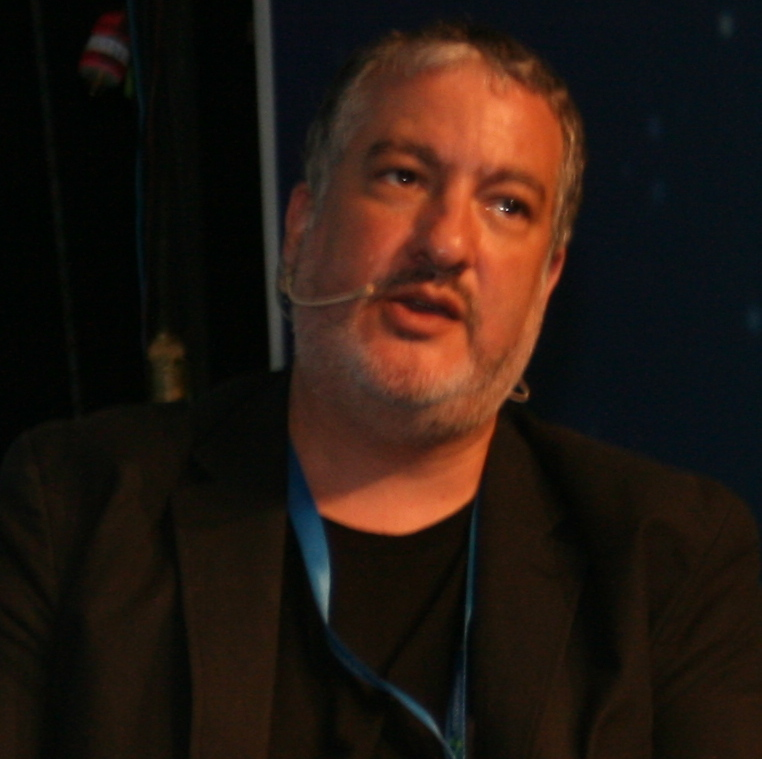
Tunick in 2013

Tunick's philosophy is that "individuals en masse, without their clothing, grouped together, metamorphose into a new shape. The bodies extend into and upon the landscape like a substance. These grouped masses which do not underscore sexuality become abstractions that challenge or reconfigure one's views of nudity and privacy."

Sometimes, after gathering his subjects together, Tunick grades them by gender, long hair, age or other characteristics. Registration for modeling on his website includes questions about skin tone. A color chart shows seven boxes ranging from stark white to baby-powder pink and dark chocolate. In his work, he plays off different flesh tones or groups people of the same color. Tunick is also interested in the juxtaposition between the organic and the mechanical, and often chooses famous buildings or unusual structures as his backdrop.

Since 1992, Tunick has traveled the world, capturing both individuals and groups in the nude. In 1994, he produced 75 distinct photographs. In Sydney, Australia, 5,200 volunteer Australians posed nude in 2010, and at the Dead Sea in Israel in 2011, around 1,200 participants paid to join the installation.

The many volunteers who participate come from diverse societal groups, and by shedding their clothes, they become a single homogeneous entity—an integrated structure stripped of individual identity, social, cultural, economic, or political distinctions. This collective body becomes a living environmental sculpture.

To mark International Women's Day on March 8, 2021, the 24th session of the Stay Apart Together project saw Tunick and Vanden Broeck collaborate with Mexican-American visual artist Daniela Edburg to depict 75 Latin American women in 11 poses, incorporating the colors purple and green (symbols of the Latin American feminist movement) and hot pink, selected by Edburg for its liveliness.

== Critical reception ==
Mia Fineman, writing for Slate magazine, said that there may be an ambiguity in Tunick's work between "transgression" and "obedience". A "regimented" quality has been observed in the arrangement of figures in some of Tunick's work, but this may be offset by the social transgression that accrues to public nakedness.

== Documentaries ==
Tunick is the subject of three HBO documentaries, Naked States, Naked World, and Positively Naked.

He is the also subject of the COVID-19 pandemic documentary film Stay Apart Together, directed by Nicole Vanden Broeck and released in 2023, in which Tunick reinvents his photography "to find a way to bring everyone together while staying apart".

== Major installations ==
2001

On May 26, 2001, between 2,500 and 3,000 volunteers gathered at the Place des Arts in Montreal, in collaboration with the Musée d'art contemporain de Montréal. Later, in September 2001, Tunick photographed 400 nude volunteers in Greenwich, London, each side of Cutty Sark, and then in a nearby street.

2002

On June 30, 2002, 4,000 volunteers got together near the Parque Forestal in Santiago completely naked at 0°. Some people from conservative and Christian background criticized the event and even protested in front of the Palacio de La Moneda after it happened, gathering around 200 people.

2003

In April 2003, Tunick was again in London to photograph 160 nude volunteers in front of the Saatchi Gallery at its opening on the South Bank, and later 500 volunteers in a nude photo shoot in Selfridges department store. In June, he photographed 7,000 naked people in Barcelona, and hundreds of women in New York's Grand Central Terminal in October.

2004

On June 26, 2004, in Cleveland, he completed his largest installation in the United States, with 2,754 people posing. In August 2004, a photo shoot was completed in Buffalo of about 1,800 nudes in Buffalo's old central train station.

2005

On July 17, 2005, he photographed almost 1,700 nudes on the quaysides at Newcastle upon Tyne and Gateshead, including the Gateshead Millennium Bridge.

On September 11, 2005, he photographed 1,493 nudes in Lyon on the Rhône quaysides and footbridge resp. between containers. On March 19, 2006, Tunick photographed 1,500 nudes in Caracas, having people standing up, lying down, and on their knees beside the main Simón Bolívar statue.

2006

On August 6, 2006, he photographed about 500 nudes in the courtyard of the Museum Kunstpalast in Düsseldorf.

2007

In 2007 Spencer Tunick was commissioned by the Dream Amsterdam Foundation to realize art projects for the artistic event Dream Amsterdam. On April 15, 2007, Tunick organized an installation in a tulip field in Schermerhorn. On June 3, 2007, he photographed installations with 2000 participants in Amsterdam: 2000 people in a car park; 250 men at a nearby gas station; and 250 women on bicycles on the Lijnbaansgracht — Lauriergracht. A small group of participants was photographed on a canal, Leliegracht, requiring a special bridge construction to create the illusion that the people were floating over the water.

On May 6, 2007, approximately 18,000 people posed for Tunick in Mexico City's principal square, the Zócalo, setting a new record, and more than doubling the previous highest number of 7,000 people who had turned out in Barcelona in 2003. Male and female volunteers of different ages stood and saluted, lay down on the ground, crouched in the fetal position, and otherwise posed for Tunick's lens in the city's massive central plaza, the Plaza de la Constitución. Here, the specific problems of photographing great numbers of people outside became clear: as Tunick could only shoot from buildings located west of the square (the three other sides of the square are government buildings and the cathedral), there was a rush to take the pictures before dawn to avoid getting sunflare in the lens. An accompanying documentary Naked in Mexico: Spencer Tunick was also filmed on, and around, the date of the photo shoot.

On August 18, 2007, Tunick used 600 nude people in a "living sculpture" on the Aletsch Glacier in an installation intended to draw attention to global warming and the shrinking of the world's glaciers in a collaboration with Greenpeace. The temperature was about 10 °C (50 °F). The Aletsch glacier retreated by 100 metres (330 ft) between 2005 and 2006. The environment-oriented installation was reported in several languages and media outlets around the world, Swiss politicians were playfully encouraged to demonstrate their green credentials by participating in Tunick's installation, and Euro RSCG Zurich, Switzerland received the AME Grand Trophy for Public Service and Not-For-Profit, for their campaign for Tunick and Greenpeace Switzerland, "Naked Testimony to Global Warming".

Tunick followed this installation with one at the Sagamore Hotel in Miami Beach.

2008

Tunick announced plans to take photographs in Ernst Happel Stadium in Vienna with 2,008 naked football fans in the run-up to the Euro 2008 tournament.

On June 17, 2008, Tunick carried out an installation in the grounds of Blarney Castle in County Cork with about 1200 people. Another photoshoot was organised for four days later (Saturday June 21) in Dublin, on the South Wall near the Poolbeg Lighthouse, with over 2500 nude people taking part. The South Wall event was somewhat washed out, with one of the proposed set-ups having to be cancelled. However, people praised the organisers for an event well run.

2009

On October 3, 2009, Tunick performed another installation in collaboration with Greenpeace, this time to draw attention to the effect climate change is having on French wine production. Over 700 volunteers turned up at a vineyard near Macon, France, for a number of poses among the vines.

2010

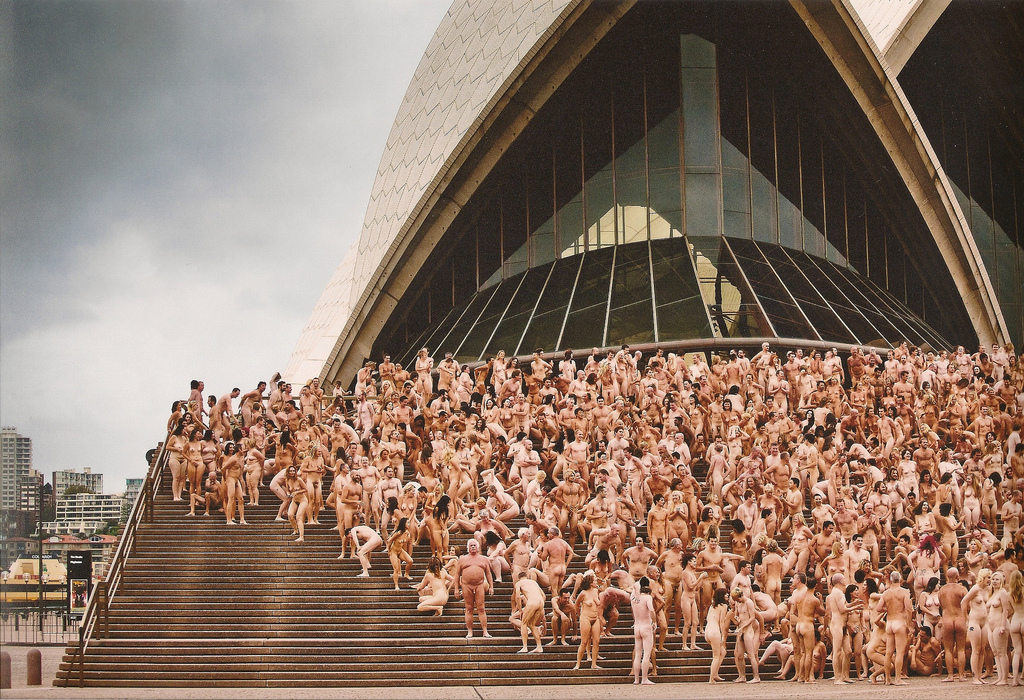
Participants preparing for photo at Sydney Opera House

On March 1, 2010, Tunick carried out a series of installations titled "The Base" on the Sydney Opera House Forecourt and inside the Opera House. The installations were carried out as part of the Sydney Gay and Lesbian Mardi Gras and were Tunick's first large-scale installation in Sydney, with over 5,200 participants. For the event, the CBC reported that Tunick had invited Lady Gaga to the photo shoot.

In May 2010, Tunick was commissioned by The Lowry to work with 1000 people in five secret locations. The resulting exhibition was called Everyday People, tying into a phrase used by L. S. Lowry in describing his art. The press were allowed a photoshoot at Peel Park, Salford on May 1, but the other locations such as Castlefields, Dantzic Street and Ringway remained unreported.

On August 8, 2010, around 700 revellers at the Big Chill Festival, at Eastnor Castle Deer Park in Herefordshire UK, shed their clothes and covered themselves in five shades of body paint for an installation that paid homage to the art of Yves Klein, Mark Rothko and Ellsworth Kelly, and made reference to the BP oil spillage in the Gulf of Mexico.

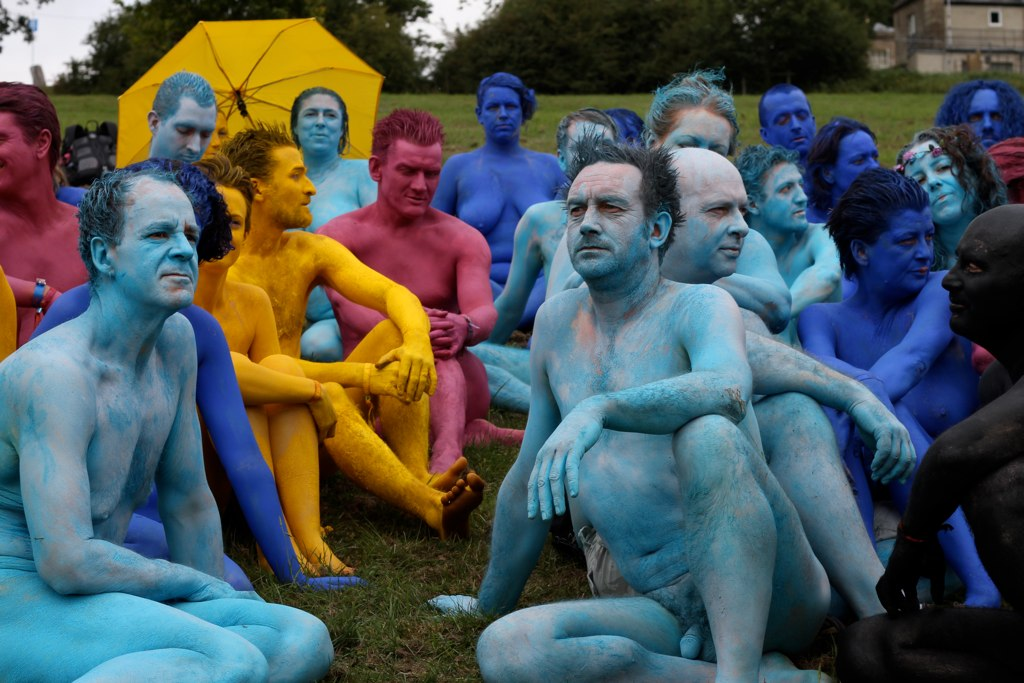
Spencer Tunick nude installation at Eastnor Castle

Tunick continued to the International Street Theatre Festival in Aurillac, France, where he had been invited to hold an installation for its 25th anniversary. The installation took place over two days, August 20 and 21, 2010. On the first morning, Tunick assembled participants with black umbrellas on a hillside above the town centre, and later with clear umbrellas in the narrow streets of the historic quarter of Aurillac. On the following morning Tunick set out to re-enact Eugène Delacroix's "Liberty Leading the People", with the help of 250 women wielding French flags, 4 men and a smoke machine.

2011

On September 17, 2011, Tunick photographed a large group of naked volunteers at the Dead Sea. 1,200 volunteers ranging in age from 20 to somewhere in their sixties set out for the Dead Sea before dawn and modeled in three different arrangements: in the sea, on land and covered in Dead Sea mud.

2012

On June 23, 2012, Tunick photographed a group of naked volunteers in Munich, Germany. Tunick was interpreting scenes from the Richard Wagner opera "Der Ring des Nibelungen". The volunteers were painted in gold or red posing outside the Bavarian State Opera House.

2016

On June 4, 2016, Tunick photographed a group of naked volunteers in Bogotá, Colombia. 6,000 volunteers ranging in age from 20 to somewhere in their sixties set out for Bogotá before dawn.

On July 9, 2016, Tunick photographed 3,200 people wearing only blue paint, in Kingston upon Hull, UK. The project was named Sea of Hull, and was commissioned by Ferens Art Gallery in recognition of the following year's City of Culture events. The gathering was the largest of any of Tunick's UK-based projects to date.

On July 18, 2016, Tunick photographed 100 nude women, in Cleveland, Ohio, where the Republican National Convention was being hosted. They held circular Mylar mirrors over their heads and reflected light at the city to expose what they view as the naked truth about Republicans. According to Tunick, the point of the exercise was to "shine the wisdom of women to change the world."

2018

In July 2018, Tunick photographed almost 500 men and women draped in sheer red cloths on top of a Woolworths supermarket building in Melbourne, Australia.

In September 2018, Tunick visited Bodø, Norway to create the artwork BODØ BODYSCAPE as part of Bodø Biennale. It was his first project in Norway, and first ever project north of the Arctic Circle.

2022

In November 2022, Tunick photographed 2500 volunteers dney's Bondi Beach. It was done during the skin cancer awareness week, with a charity Skin Check Champions being a collaborator.

2024

In October 2024, Tunick photographed over 5500 volunteers on Australia, Brisbane’s Story Bridge, having them pose in many different ways. This installment, titled "Rising Tide", was a sequel to a smaller photoshoot in 2023 Melt Festival, titled "Tide". Monique Ross, writing for The Guardian, remarked on the diversity, listing "Stocky bodies. Sagging bodies. Tattooed bodies. Transitioning bodies. Scarred bodies. Bony bodies. Pregnant bodies. Chiselled bodies. Bodies needing assistance from a wheelchair, a walker, a pair of crutches".

== See also ==
- Public nudity
- Tableau vivant
