= Brighouse bus station =

Bus station in West Yorkshire, England

Coordinates: 53°42′9.6″N 1°46′50″W

Brighouse
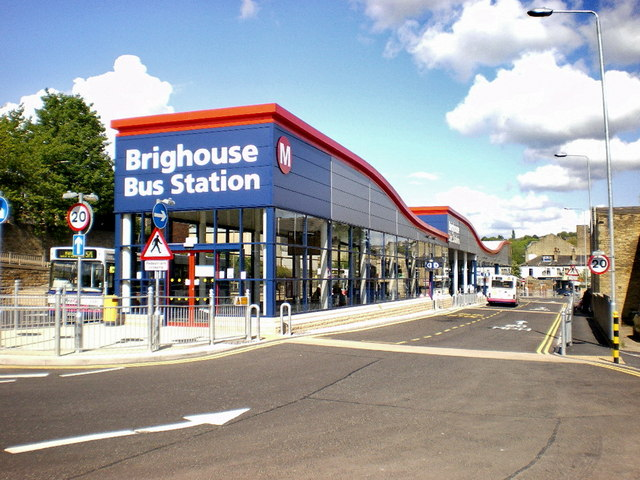

General information
- Location: Ganny Road, Brighouse; Calderdale
- Operator: West Yorkshire Metro
- Bus stands: 6
- Bus operators: First Calderdale & Huddersfield; First Bradford; Arriva Yorkshire; TLC Travel
- Connections: Brighouse railway station (660 yards [600 m])

History
- Opened: May 2009
Location

Brighouse bus station serves the town of Brighouse, West Yorkshire, England. The bus station is owned and managed by West Yorkshire Metro. The bus station is situated in the Brighouse Town Centre and could be accessed from Gooder Street and Ganny Road. The current station was opened from 10 May 2009 on the site of the previous one that dates back from the 1970s.

The new bus station cost £2.38 million and provides passengers with more comfortable and safer enclosed waiting areas, new seating and lighting, real time electronic passenger information, 24-hour CCTV surveillance and additional footpaths and pedestrian access It has six stands.

== Services ==
The main operators that use the station are First West Yorkshire's Bradford and Calderdale & Huddersfield operations, Arriva Yorkshire and Team Pennine. National Express services go from here daily south to London Victoria Coach Station.

Buses run from the bus station to Bradford, Cleckheaton, Dewsbury, Elland, Halifax and Huddersfield.There used to be a service to Saltaire but it was cut.
