= Rastrick Bridge =

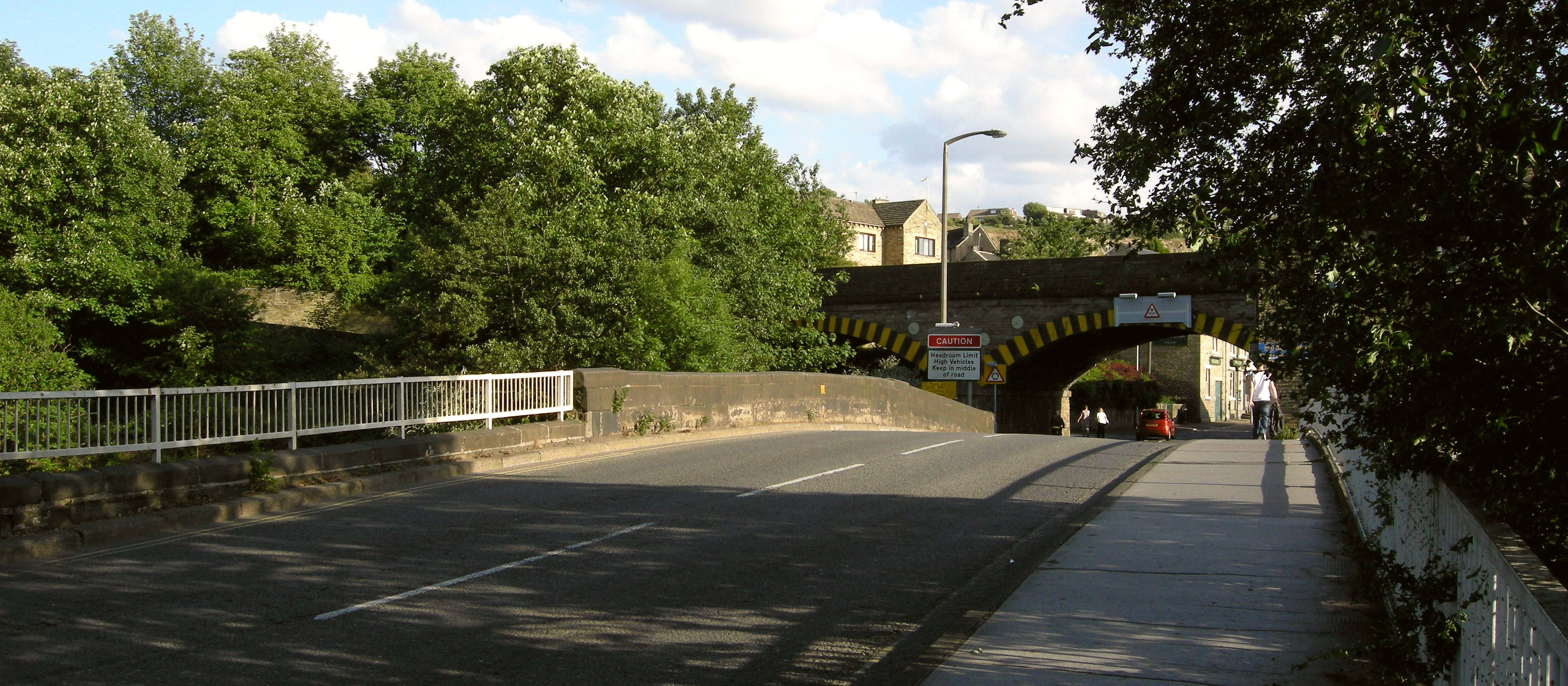
- Coordinates: 53.6993°N 1.7832°W
- Carries: A643
- Crosses: River Calder
- Locale: Brighouse, West Yorkshire
- Other name(s): Brighouse Bridge

Characteristics
- Design: arch bridge
- Material: Stone
- No. of spans: 3
- Piers in water: 2

History
- Opened: 1558 (rebuilt 1750)

Rastrick Bridge crosses the River Calder in Brighouse, West Yorkshire, England. It was built in 1558 as a replacement for an earlier wooden bridge and rebuilt c1750.

== History ==
A wooden structure called Rastrick Bridge was recorded as being present in 1275. The bridge was replaced by one built with timber donated by John Hanson in 1514. Hanson's son funded a stone replacement for this bridge in 1558.

== See also ==
- List of crossings of the River Calder
