= Brighouse Bridge =

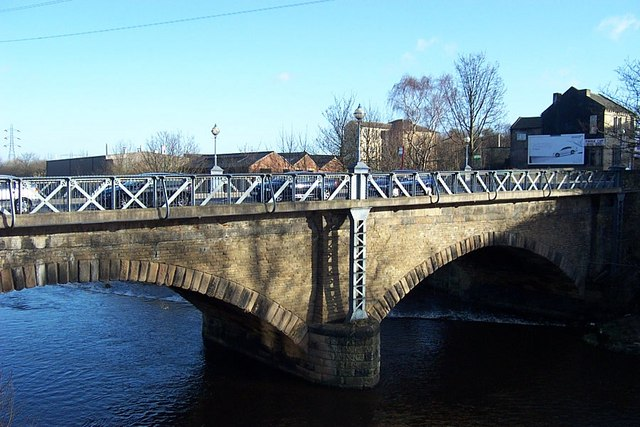
- Coordinates: 53.6995°N 1.7792°W
- Carries: A641
- Crosses: River Calder
- Locale: Brighouse, West Yorkshire
- Other name(s): Calder Bridge

Characteristics
- Design: arch bridge
- Material: Stone
- No. of spans: 2
- Piers in water: 1

History
- Opened: 1825

The Brighouse Bridge crosses the River Calder in Brighouse, West Yorkshire, England. It was built in 1825 as part of the Halifax and Huddersfield Turnpike.

== History ==
The Halifax and Huddersfield Turnpike Act 1824 (5 Geo. 4. c. ciii) allowed for the building of Calder Bridge (now called Brighouse Bridge) on what was to become the A641 road; tolls were abolished on the bridge in 1875 and extensive widening work was undertaken in 1905 and 1999 (both of these latter dates being commemorated in dedication stones on the bridge).

== See also ==
- List of crossings of the River Calder
