= A643 road =

Road in England

A643

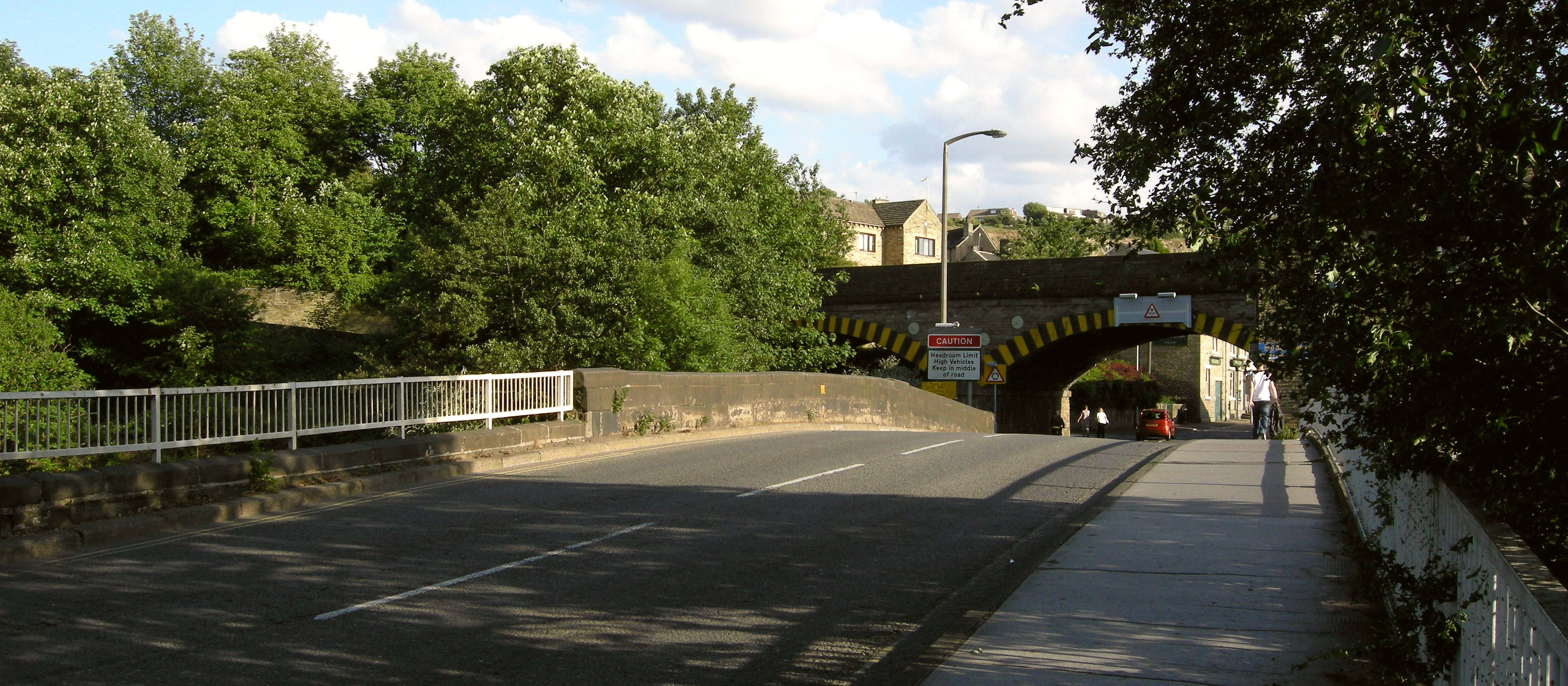
- A643 crossing Rastrick Bridge

Route information
- Length: 18 mi (29 km)

Major junctions
- East end: Leeds; 53.7892°N 1.5671°W
- A58 M621 A6110 A650; A62 A652 A651 A638 A649 A644 A641 A6107 A629 A640
- West end: Outlane; 53.6599°N 1.8592°W

Location
- Country: United Kingdom
- Primary destinations: Leeds; Brighouse; Huddersfield

Road network
- Roads in the United Kingdom; Motorways; A and B road zones

The A643 is a main road between Leeds and Huddersfield in West Yorkshire, England. Its eastern end is at the Armley Gyratory roundabout on the western edge of Leeds City Centre. The road then goes through the following places:

- Beeston
- Churwell
- Morley
- Bruntcliffe
- Howden Clough
- Birstall
- Gomersal
- Cleckheaton
- Hartshead Moor Top
- Clifton
- Brighouse
- Rastrick
- Ainley Top

to its western end, at junction 23 of the M62 Motorway (Mount Roundabout, Outlane, Huddersfield). The road is approximately 18 miles (29 km) long.

== Road features ==
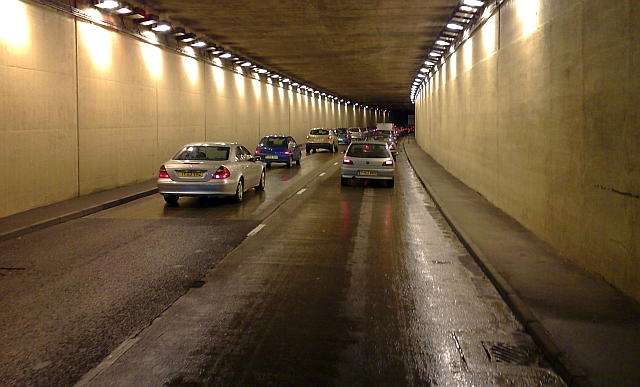
The A643 Ingram Distributor in Leeds

In Leeds, the road is a dual carriageway that links the Armley Gyratory roundabout with the M621 motorway at junction 2. This part of the A643 is known as the Ingram Distributor. It is a vital road artery to the city as it links the city centre with the Motorway. If accidents happen there, then this could cause traffic congestion around the city.

The Leeds United AFC football stadium in Beeston is named after the road part of the A643 that passes it, Elland Road. This road is so called because the A643 originally ended in town of Elland near Halifax.

The A643 road goes over the River Calder in Brighouse as Rastrick Bridge.
