= Sea of Hull =

2016 photographic artwork by Spencer Tunick

Sea of Hull is the title of a photographic installation artwork created by American artist Spencer Tunick in Hull, United Kingdom on 9 July 2016. The work was commissioned by the city's Ferens Art Gallery to mark Hull's status as UK City of Culture 2017. It also sought to bring attention to rising sea levels propelled by climate change.

The installation featured 3,200 volunteers, each one being naked and body-painted. This made it the largest artwork Tunick had created in the UK, ahead of previous installations at Gateshead in 2005 and Salford in 2010. Volunteers had registered from around 20 countries.

== Volunteers ==
Ferens Art Gallery announced plans for the installation in a call for volunteers on 30 March 2016. It stated an intention to gather "hundreds of naked people", although Tunick later said: "I needed around 2,500 to 3,000 [volunteers] to do this work and 3,200 came. I was incredibly lucky to be able to fill up streets into the distance."

Volunteers had to be aged 18 or older. The call said: "In response to Hull's maritime history, Tunick's participants will wear body paint to reference the colours of the sea found in the Ferens Art Gallery's paintings. Sea of Hull will be presented at the gallery in 2017, during the UK City of Culture year. [...] Each participant will receive a limited edition print of the installation as a permanent record of involvement. You will only be naked for a short period of time."

== Installation ==
Volunteers arrived at a meeting point in Queen's Gardens, near the city centre, at 3 am on Saturday 9 July 2016. They were each issued a tub containing one of four different paint colours. At a designated time, they were asked to remove all their clothes and help to paint each other. Using megaphones, Tunick's assistants then ordered the crowds into position for what would be a 3-hour photoshoot.

The first photographs were taken at Queen's Gardens Rosebowl, where volunteers formed a giant circle around the flowerbeds to represent water flowing around a ship's wheel. Volunteers then proceeded on foot to a second main location alongside the Guildhall in Alfred Gelder Street, with more shots taken along its side in Parliament Street and Manor Street. A third set of photographs was taken at Lowgate. The fourth and final installation of the day was on Scale Lane Bridge.

The following day, on Sunday 10 July 2016, a smaller group of volunteers was taken by bus to a field on the south-east side of the Humber Bridge, where a further installation was created and photographed by Tunick.

== Exhibition ==
Spencer Tunick's Sea of Hull artworks were unveiled at the Ferens Art Gallery, Hull in 2017 as part of an exhibition called 'SKIN'. Volunteers who had participated in the installation were invited to a special viewing at the gallery on Friday 21 April before the exhibition opened to the public on Saturday 22 April 2017.

The exhibition included three of Tunick's photographs that had been bought by the gallery. Friends of Ferens Gallery launched a crowd funding bid to buy a fourth.

The city council later said the exhibition had contributed to a record number of people visiting Ferens Art Gallery in 2017, with 519,000 visits being highest total in the gallery's 90-year history.
