= Giles Brearley =

English local historian

Giles H Brearley (born 14 August 1955) is a published South Yorkshire local historian who has also both written and appeared in television and film. He has been a regular presenter on the radio regarding history.

He is a qualified chartered management accountant who was in public practice. He was the senior partner in Brearley and Co which he commenced in 1984 and remaining until August 2015. He is also a 'practice certificate' assessor for the Chartered Institute of Management Accountants.

He is a director sitting on the boards of various companies being also a former director of football league club Rotherham United F.C. He is chairman of the Bridge Property Group ltd and is a charitable trustee for Mexborough Alms Houses. He was presented to the Queen and Prince Philip at Sheffield Town Hall for his services to charitable causes

He lives in South Yorkshire and East Sheen in London. He has been instrumental in organising fundraising for the erection of plaques to South Yorkshire historic achievers. He was also instrumental in arranging for the rescue and re-erection of the historical Glassby Arch at Mexborough. He acquired Brampton Old Hall at Brampton Bierlow as a derelict building and has restored it back to its former glory days. It was another South Yorkshire historic building under threat of being lost forever.

== Published works ==
=== Books ===
- History of Lead Mining in the Peak District (Dalesman,ISBN 978-0-85206-416-0)
- We will remember - jointly written with Graham Oliver (of Saxon fame)
- Grave Tales of South Yorkshire (Pen and sword,ISBN 978-1-871647-70-9)
- The history of St Thomas and the village of Kilnhurst (Swinton Heritage)
- Alfred Liversidge England's fastest man (Neville Douglas Publishing)
- The life and times of Arthur Morris the Pitman's Poet (Swinton Heritage, ISBN 1-904706-08-8)
- Swinton in Pictures - jointly written with Ken Wyatt (Swinton Heritage, )
- Old Swinton in Pictures - jointly written with Ken Wyatt (Swinton Heritage,ISBN 1-904706-17-7)
- Industrial South Yorkshire - jointly written with Paul Walters (Pen and sword,ISBN 978-1-871647-43-3)
- Industrial Doncaster - jointly written with Paul Walters (Pen and Sword,ISBN 978-1-871647-50-1)
- Industrial Rotherham - jointly written with Paul Walters (Pen and Sword,ISBN 978-1-871647-51-8)
- The History of Swinton Hall and Swinton House (Swinton Heritage, ISBN 1-904706-2--07)
- Mexborough a Town at War (Swinton Heritage)
- The business of trying to keep Rotherham United "The DC Years" - jointly written with Gavin Mackinder(ISBN 978-1-904706-27-4).
- The Iron Man, the biography of James William Hague former heavyweight English Boxing champion. (ISBN 978-1-904706-88-5)
- Safecracker. The biography of Albert Hattersley, UK's most prolific Safe blower. Joint with Michael Fowler. (ISBN 978-1-907636-49-3)
- Adwick upon Dearne in the news a thousand years of village history.(ISBN 978-1-910719-12-1)
- Shotguns and Shooting- The law explained. (ISBN 978-1910719374)
- The history of Brampton Bierlow Old Hall.
- The History of Scabba Wood, Sprotborough.

1960's Memories of Mexborough, over 30 fellow contributors Mexborough Heritage (ISBN 978-1-9192514-0-0)

=== Films ===
- Kilnhurst Graveyard tour
- Swinton Grave yard tour
- The Mexborough Time machine
- They answered the call
- The History of Sprotborough Hall
- The History of Swinton Parts 1,2,3 and 4
- The Norman Watson interviews
- The History of Ferrybridge Pottery
