= Joeli Brearley =

British author and activist

Joeli Brearley is an activist, author and the founder of the charity Pregnant Then Screwed. Brearley has campaigned for improved rights and against discrimination. She was awarded an MBE.

== Pregnant Then Screwed ==
Brearley founded Pregnant then Screwed in 2015. Pregnant Then Screwed is a charity that campaigns for improvements to maternity rights, support for parent who work and on tackling workplace discrimination. They also offer legal advice for mothers and future mothers for tribunals. On 24 October 2024 she announced she would resign as CEO in February 2025

== Books ==
Brearley's first book was Pregnant Then Screwed: The Truth About the Motherhood Penalty.

== Awards ==
Brearley was awarded an MBE "for services to working families" in the 2025 New Year Honours.
