= List of crossings of the River Aire =

This is a list of current bridges and other crossings of the River Aire and are listed from source downstream to the river's mouth.

== Crossings ==
=== Source to Apperley Bridge ===
Crossing	Location	Type	Co-ordinates	Date opened	Notes	Photo
Hanlith Bridge	Kirkby Malham	Road bridge	54°02′46.7″N 2°09′16.2″W	18th century		Hanlith_Bridge_-_geograph.org.uk_-_1521490
Airton Bridge	Airton	Road bridge	54°01′43.9″N 2°08′53.8″W	19th century		Airton Bridge
Bell Busk Bridge	Bell Busk	Road bridge	54°00′12.6″N 2°08′45″W	18th century		Red_Bridge,_Bell_Busk_-_geograph.org.uk_-_1773356
Bell Busk Viaduct	Bell Busk	Railway bridge	54°00′01.1″N 2°08′51.2″W	1849	Viaduct carrying the Leeds–Morecambe line	Bell_Busk_railway_viaduct_-_river_span_-_geograph.org.uk_-_6285067
Coniston Bridge	Coniston Cold	Road bridge	53°59′27.2″N 2°08′27.4″W	1763	Bridge carries A65 road	Coniston_Bridge,_Coniston_Cold_-_geograph.org.uk_-_4927705
Priest Holme Aqueduct	Gargrave	Canal aqueduct	53°58′48.5″N 2°07′36.4″W	1790	Aqueduct carrying Leeds and Liverpool Canal	Aire_Aqueduct_-_geograph.org.uk_-_7487240
Priest Holme Bridge	Gargrave	Railway bridge	53°58′49.4″N 2°07′27.4″W	1849	Carries Leeds–Morecambe railway line	Steam_Train_crossing_River_Aire_-_geograph.org.uk_-_7519186
Stepping stones	Gargrave	pedestrians	53°58′58.1″N 2°06′29.3″W		Stepping stones in use when river is in low flow	Walking_on_Aire_-_geograph.org.uk_-_7794414
Gargrave Bridge	Gargrave	Road bridge	53°58′57.9″N 2°06′22.2″W	19th century		Gargrave_Bridge_-_geograph.org.uk_-_6458397
Niffany Viaduct	Skipton	Railway bridge	53°57′52.9″N 2°03′51.3″W	1849 (0riginal) c. 1920 (replaced)	Carries Leeds–Morecambe railway line	Railway_bridge_across_River_Aire_-_geograph.org.uk_-_7733057
Inghey River Bridge	Skipton	Road bridge	53°57′41.4″N 2°03′39.4″W		Carries A59 road	Inghey_Bridge_-_geograph.org.uk_-_7499908
Inghey Bridge	Skipton	Pedestrians	53°57′39.7″N 2°03′38.1″W	1773	Former A59 bridge made redundant to vehicular traffic when Skipton bypass was opened in the 1980s.	Inghey Bridge
Carleton Bridge	Carleton	Road bridge	53°56′48.9″N 2°01′36.1″W	1825–1827	Formerly main route south through the Aire Valley from Skipton	
Railway bridge	Snaygill, Skipton	Railway bridge	53°56′27.1″N 2°01′19.4″W		Carries Airedale Line	Railway_bridge_over_the_River_Aire_-_geograph.org.uk_-_3551750
Cononley Bridge	Cononley	Road bridge	53°55′01.8″N 2°00′31.0″W			
Kildwick Bridge (A629)	Kildwick	Road bridge	53°54′26.8″N 1°59′08.0″W	August 1988	Carries the A629 Kildwick bypass	Beneath_Kildwick_bypass_-_geograph.org.uk_-_7558068
Kildwick Bridge	Kildwick	Road bridge	53°54′26.9″N 1°59′04.2″W	1313	Grade I listed bridge bypassed in August 1988 but still open to local traffic	Kildwick_Bridge_over_River_Aire_-_geograph.org.uk_-_65005
Silsden Bridge	Silsden	Road bridge	53°54′09.1″N 1°56′36.0″W	1790	Carries A6034 road	Silsden_Bridge_viewed_from_SW_bank_of_River_Aire_-_geograph.org.uk_-_7727267
Unnamed bridge	Utley	Road bridge	53°53′10.4″N 1°55′05.6″W		Carries road to golf club	
Stock Bridge	Stockbridge, Keighley	Road bridge	53°52′34.3″N 1°53′17.0″W	1930	Road bridge carrying the B6265 (formerly carried the A650 road, bypassed in October 1988)	Stock_Bridge,_Bradford_Road_-_geograph.org.uk_-_5635499
Unnamed bridge	Crossflatts	Road bridge	53°51′46.1″N 1°51′25.7″W	October 1988	Carries the A650 road	Aire_Valley_Road,_Bridge_over_River_Aire_at_Crossflatts,_Bingley_-_geograph.org.uk_-_87116
Unnamed bridge	Crossflatts	Railway bridge	53°51′44.3″N 1°51′26.3″W		Carries the Airedale Line (includes two spans, one disused)	
Ireland Bridge	Bingley	Road bridge	53°51′1.1″N 1°50′29.8″W	1686	Carries the B6429 road between Bingley and Cullingworth.	River_Aire,_Ireland_Bridge_at_Bingley_-_geograph.org.uk_-_4437702
Unnamed bridge	Bingley	Footbridge	53°50′42.5″N 1°50′33.8″W		Footbridge in Myrtle Park	Footbridge_across_the_Aire_-_geograph.org.uk_-_7689932
Unnamed bridge	Bingley	Footbridge	53°50′36.7″N 1°50′21.9″W		Footbridge in Myrtle Park	Footbridge_from_Myrtle_Park_across_the_River_Aire_-_geograph.org.uk_-_471328
Cottingley Bridge	Cottingley	Road bridge	53°50′17.7″N 1°49′50.1″W		Formerly carried the A650 bridge (bypassed in 2003) now carries B6265	Cottingley Bridge
Unnamed bridge	Cottingley	Fresh water pipe	53°50′15.8″N 1°49′41.9″W	1899	Castellated bridge that acts as a siphon for the Nidd Aqueduct	Aqueduct over the River Aire east of Cottingley Road Bridge
Cottingley Viaduct	Cottingley	Road bridge	53°50′07.5″N 1°49′07.3″W	December 2003	Dual carriageway road (A650 bypass) across Aire Valley	Cottingley Viaduct
River Aire Viaduct	Dowley Gap	Railway bridge	53°50′18.8″N 1°48′42.3″W		Carries Airedale Line	River Aire beneath railway bridge
Dowley Gap Aqueduct (Seven Arches Aqueduct)	Dowley Gap	Canal aqueduct	53°50′25.1″N 1°48′56.9″W	1773	Carries Leeds and Liverpool Canal	Dowley Gap Aqueduct
Unnamed footbridge	Saltaire	Pedestrian footbridge	53°50′24.1″N 1°47′23.2″W		Links Saltaire with Roberts Park on the north bank of the river	River_Aire_Footbridge_at_Saltaire_-_geograph.org.uk_-_4404553
Otley Road Bridge	Shipley	Road Bridge	53°50′13.7″N 1°46′24.0″W		Carries A6038 road between Shipley and Guiseley	Baildon_Bridge_and_River_Aire_after_heavy_rainfall_-_off_Otley_Road_-_geograph.org.uk_-_1593891
Charlestown Viaduct	Baildon	Railway viaduct	53°50′32.8″N 1°45′43.2″W		Carries Wharfedale line	Baildon - Railway Viaduct
Buck Mill Bridge	Thackley	Pedestrian bridge	53°50′55.0″N 1°44′40.5″W	1889		Buck_Lane_Footbridge_-_geograph.org.uk_-_1567977
Esholt Bridges	Esholt	Sewer pipes	53°51′12.6″N 1°43′10.9″W			Pipe bridge over the Aire by Esholt Lane
Apperley Viaducts	Apperley Bridge	Railway bridge	53°50′34.0″N 1°42′39.8″W	1867/1900	Carries Airedale Line on 1900 viaduct; 1867 viaduct still standing but unused	Apperley Viaduct, Apperley Bridge, Bradford
The Bridge	Apperley Bridge	Road bridge	53°50′16.0″N 1°42′21.8″W		Carries minor road	Old Apperley Bridge, upstream side
Unnamed bridge	Apperley Bridge	Road bridge	53°50′13.9″N 1°42′18.7″W		Carries A658 road	The new Apperley Bridge from the old one
Woodhouse Bridge	Apperley Bridge	Railway bridge	53°50′24.0″N 1°41′33.2″W		Carries both Airedale and Wharfedale lines	Woodhouse Bridge

=== Calverley to Knowsthorpe ===
Crossing	Location	Type	Co-ordinates	Date opened	Notes	Photo
Calverley Viaduct	Calverley	Railway bridge	53°49′55.9″N 1°40′12.4″W		Carries Airedale Line	Railway Bridge, River Aire, Calverley, Leeds
Calverley Bridge	Calverley Bridge	Pedestrian bridge	53°49′43.4″N 1°39′54.4″W	1775	Former road bridge superseded by A6120 bridge just to the east	Calverley Pack Horse Bridge, Rodley, Leeds
Unnamed bridge	Calverley Bridge	Road bridge	53°49′40.1″N 1°39′43.1″W		Carries A6120 Leeds Ring Road	Horsforth_New_Road_Bridge,_River_Aire,_Leeds_-_geograph.org.uk_-_4932659
Unnamed bridge	Rodley	Road bridge	53°49′18.9″N 1°39′08.8″W		Carries traffic to and from Rodley Nature Reserve	Rodley_Nature_Reserve_Bridge,_Leeds_-_geograph.org.uk_-_4977368
Unnamed bridge	Newlay	Railway bridge	53°49′36.7″N 1°38′21.9″W		Carries Airedale Line	Railway_Bridge,_River_Aire,_Newlay,_Leeds_-_geograph.org.uk_-_4944163
Newlay Bridge (Pollard Bridge)	Newlay	Pedestrian bridge	53°49′41.6″N 1°38′19.5″W	1819	Carries pedestrian traffic	Newlay_Bridge_-_geograph.org.uk_-_382325
Unnamed bridge	Kirkstall Forge	Road bridge	53°49′37.9″N 1°37′47.6″W		Girder bridge part of the former Kirkstall Forge Engineering plant	Kirkstall_Forge_Bridge_-_geograph.org.uk_-_382699
Kirkstall Forge Station Bridge	Kirkstall Forge	Road bridge	53°49′34″N 1°37′34.6″W	2015	Carries traffic to and from Kirkstall Forge railway station only	Kirkstall_Forge_development_-_new_bridge_-_geograph.org.uk_-_5825386
Kirkstall Forge Footbridge	Kirkstall Forge	Pedestrian bridge	53°49′27.3″N 1°37′24.5″W		Pedestrian bridge between buildings on the former Kirkstall Forge Engineering plant	Footbridge_beside_Kirkstall_Forge_Railway_Bridge,_Leeds_-_geograph.org.uk_-_4930374
Kirkstall Forge Viaduct	Kirkstall Forge	Railway bridge	53°49′26.2″N 1°37′25.2″W		Double Crossing. Carries Airedale Line	Kirkstall_Forge_Railway_Bridge_and_work_for_Kirkstall_Forge_Station_(geograph_4323495)
Kirkstall Bridge	Kirkstall	Road bridge	53°48′56.9″N 1°36′25.5″W	1912	Carries B6157 road	Kirkstall_Bridge_over_the_River_Aire_-_geograph.org.uk_-_183834
Kirkstall ford and weir	Kirkstall	Ford	53°48′40.6″N 1°36′6.5″W		Gritstone ford across to island between the river and millrace	Ford_across_the_River_Aire,_Kirkstall_-_geograph.org.uk_-_241094
Gott's Bridge	Kirkstall Valley	Road bridge	53°48′23.9″N 1°35′15.6″W		Bridge built to enable millworkers to cross between Armley and Kirkstall. Latterly provided access to Kirkstall Power Station before closure.	Gott's Bridge, Redcote Lane, Kirkstall, Leeds
Buffalo Bill Bridge	Armley	Pedestrian bridge	53°48′12.4″N 1°34′59.4″W		Pedestrian access bridge to Armley Mills Industrial Museum, routinely locked when the museum is closed.	Bridge_Over_the_River_Aire_at_Armley_Mills_-_geograph.org.uk_-_3485057
Unnamed bridge	Burley	Rail and pipe bridge	53°48′10.2″N 1°34′50.0″W		Disused rail bridge that had carried railway exhibits to Armley Mills Industrial Museum Partially demolished during Storm Franklin, 2022.	Under_the_Bridge_at_Armley_Mills_Leeds_leading_from_Milford_Place_-_geograph.org.uk_-_4821392
Milford Place Bridge	Burley	Pedestrian bridge	53°48′09.1″N 1°34′47.3″W			Milford_Place_footbridge_reopened_-_geograph.org.uk_-_7220032
Kirkstall Viaduct	Burley	Railway bridge	53°48′08.8″N 1°34′40.4″W	1849	Railway name is Kirkstall Viaduct (even though it is in Burley) as it goes over Kirkstall Road (Note: Bairstow in "Railways Through Airedale and Wharfedale" lists it as Burley Viaduct)	River_Aire_-_geograph.org.uk_-_7931033
Viaduct Road Bridge	Burley	Road bridge	53°48′08.8″N 1°34′38.7″W			Viaduct Road Bridge, Kirkstall, Leeds
Wellington Bridge	Leeds	Road bridge	53°47′46.9″N 1°33′44.2″W	Original 1819	Carries A58 road	
Central Viaduct	Leeds	Railway viaduct	53°47′40.0″N 1°33′32.5″W	1846	Disused viaduct to the former Leeds Central and Leeds Wellington (goods) railway stations	Central Viaduct, Leeds
Monk Bridge	Leeds	Road bridge	53°47′37.3″N 1°33′30.1″W	1886	Carries Whitehall Road	Whitehall_Road_Bridge_no_225G_-_Leeds_^_Liverpool_Canal_-_geograph.org.uk_-_2110581
Whitehall Riverside Bridge	Leeds	Pedestrian bridge	53°47′36.6″N 1°33′19.8″W	2007		Footbridge_over_the_River_Aire_with_the_Candle_in_the_background_-_geograph.org.uk_-_2370107
Leeds railway station	Leeds	Railway bridge	53°47′39.8″N 1°32′56.2″W	1854/1869	Carries the whole of the west end of Leeds railway station	The_new_Southern_entrance_to_Leeds_railway_station_(geograph_4812751)
Waterman's Bridge	Leeds	Pedestrian bridge	53°47′36.4″N 1°32′53.5″W	2008		Bridge_over_the_Aire_-_geograph.org.uk_-_5703955
Victoria Bridge	Leeds	Road bridge	53°47′33.4″N 1°32′49.4″W	1839	Carries Neville Street (Note: From Victoria Bridge to Richmond Bridge, the River runs in conjunction with the Aire and Calder Navigation)	Victoria_Bridge_-_geograph.org.uk_-_5626740
David Oluwale Bridge	Leeds	Pedestrian and bike bridge	53°47′34.3″N 1°32′36.5″W	2023	Links Water Lane and Sovereign St	David_Oluwale_bridge_(geograph_7400333)
Leeds Bridge	Leeds	Road bridge	53°47′38.1″N 1°32′30.6″W	1873	Carries Bridge End road. The world's first moving images were shot of traffic on the bridge by Louis Le Prince in 1888	Leeds Bridge
Centenary Footbridge	Leeds	Pedestrian bridge	53°47′39.8″N 1°32′16.0″W	1993	Opened to commemorate 100 years of city status for Leeds	Footbridge over the Aire, central Leeds
Crown Point Bridge	Leeds	Road bridge	53°47′37.3″N 1°32′5.3″W	1842	Carries the A61 road	Crown Point Bridge & River Aire, Leeds
Knight's Way Bridge	Leeds	Pedestrian bridge	53°47′33.4″N 1°31′59.7″W	2007	Opened to allow pedestrian traffic between Clarence Dock and Fearn's Island areas	River Aire, Knight's Way Bridge
Climate Innovation District Bridge	Leeds	Pedestrian bridge	53°47′20.4″N 1°31′35.3″W	2019	Connects the two sites that comprise a new residential development	The_River_Aire_under_CITU_Bridge,_Leeds_-_geograph.org.uk_-_8233187
Richmond Bridge	Leeds	Road bridge	53°47′12.9″N 1°31′29.3″W		Carries A61 road	Richmond_Bridge_-_Reflections_-_geograph.org.uk_-_1574737
Unnamed bridge	Thwaite Gate	Gas pipeline	53°46′45.0″N 1°30′51.7″W		Carries gas pipeline	Pipe_bridge_at_Knowsthorpe,_looking_east_-_geograph.org.uk_-_5674179
Knowsthorpe Weir bridge	Knowsthorpe	Cycle and Pedestrian bridge	53°46′38.8″N 1°30′43.8″W			New_weirs_on_the_river_Aire_at_Knowsthorpe,_downstream_view_-_geograph.org.uk_-_6316726
Skelton Grange Road Bridge	Thwaite Mills	Private road	53°46′32.5″N 1°29′55.7″W		Carries private road	Bridge_over_Aire_and_Calder_Navigation_-_geograph.org.uk_-_2734218

=== Stourton to river mouth ===
Crossing	Location	Type	Co-ordinates	Date opened	Notes	Photo
Aire Valley Viaduct	Stourton	Road bridge	53°45′58.6″N 1°28′54.7″W	1999	Carries extension of M1 motorway to A1(M) motorway at Hook Moor	The_M1_crossing_the_River_Aire_-_geograph.org.uk_-_2714524
Unnamed bridge	Rothwell	Railway bridge (disused)	53°45′59.6″N 1°28′47.8″W		Carried former Skelton to Rothwell colliery line	Former_railway_bridge_over_the_river_Aire_-_geograph.org.uk_-_5676895
Skelton Bridge	Rothwell	Pedestrian bridge	53°45′59.2″N 1°28′37.8″W	2017	New path and cycleway to connect paths on either side of the river and canal	Footbridge_over_The_River_Aire_leading_to_Skelton_Country_Park,_Leeds_-_geograph.org.uk_-_7958698
Swillington Bridge	Swillington	Road bridge	53°45′36.0″N 1°26′10.3″W		Carries A642 road	Swillington Bridge
Unnamed bridge	Methley	Road bridge	53°44′55.1″N 1°25′21.3″W		Carries pathways and walking trails	Bridge_over_the_river_Aire_-_geograph.org.uk_-_5691220
Shan House Bridge	Methley	Road bridge	53°44′30.4″N 1°24′46.4″W		Carries pathways and walking trails	Footbridge_over_the_River_Aire_-_geograph.org.uk_-_2317155
Caroline Footbridge	Methley	Road bridge	53°44′39.6″N 1°23′57.1″W		Carries pathways and walking trails	New_Caroline_Bridge_-_geograph.org.uk_-_7350916
Castleford Bridge (Millennium Bridge)	Castleford	Pedestrian bridge	53°43′42.2″N 1°21′8.6″W	2008	Bridge was opened as part of the town's regeneration and also filmed for Channel 4's Grand Designs programme	Millennium Bridge over the River Aire, Castleford
Castleford Bridge	Castleford	Road bridge	53°43′42.3″N 1°20′58.7″W	1808	Carries the A656 road	Castleford Bridge
Unnamed bridge	Castleford	Road bridge	53°43′51.0″N 1°20′47.6″W		Carries path	
Unnamed bridge	Castleford	Road bridge	53°43′58.8″N 1°20′50.1″W		Carries road	The_River_Aire_at_Castleford_Ings_-_geograph.org.uk_-_4913274
Castleford Viaduct	Castleford	Disused railway	53°44′10.3″N 1°20′23.6″W	1878	Girder bridge that used to carry the Castleford–Garforth railway line; may re-open as a cycle and footpath (Note: From Castleford Viaduct to A162 road bridge, the River runs in conjunction with the Aire and Calder Navigation)	The "Iron Bridge" at Castleford
Aire Bridge	Fairburn	Railway bridge	53°44′16.9″N 1°17′26.3″W		Carries railway line	Aire Bridge
Lagentium Bridge	Brotherton	Road bridge	53°44′04.4″N 1°17′08.9″W	2006	Bridge carries A1(M)	New Motorway Bridge over River Aire at Fairburn
Unnamed bridge	Brotherton	Pipe bridge	53°43′36.1″N 1°16′40.4″W		Carries pipes	Pipe bridge, Ferrybridge B power station
Brotherton Bridge	Brotherton	Railway bridge	53°43′24.8″N 1°16′15.8″W		Carries railway line	2001 : Railway Bridge - Brotherton
Ferry Bridge	Ferrybridge	Pedestrian bridge	53°42′57.1″N 1°16′11.0″W	1804	Former road bridge	The old bridge at Ferrybridge
Unnamed bridge	Ferrybridge	Road bridge	53°42′54.2″N 1°16′7.8″W		Carries A162 road	Bridge, Ferrybridge
Unnamed bridge	Willow Garth	Pipeline	53°42′37.0″N 1°13′27.2″W		Carries pipeline	Rejoining the river Aire at Knottingley lock
Beal Bridge	Beal	Road bridge	53°43′25.5″N 1°11′38.5″W		Carries local road	Beal Bridge (geograph 8293571)
Haddlesey Bridge	Chapel Haddlesey	Road bridge	53°43′42.8″N 1°07′25.8″W		Carries A19 road	
Temple Hirst Bridges	Temple Hirst	Railway bridges	53°42′56.2″N 1°05′21.2″W; 53°42′56.5″N 1°05′20.2″W		Railway bridges carrying lines between Doncaster and York, and Doncaster and Selby	Temple_Hirst_bridges_over_the_River_Aire_-_geograph.org.uk_-_6003630
Aire Bridge (River Aire Viaduct)	Gowdall	Railway bridge	53°42′15.2″N 1°03′30.9″W		Carries freight railway to Drax Power Station	
Carlton New Bridge	Snaith	Road bridge	53°41′51.0″N 1°01′36.9″W	1928	Carries A1041 road	Carlton_New_Bridge_-_geograph.org.uk_-_7823538
Newland Bridge	Newland	Road bridge	53°42′52.0″N 0°57′31.1″W	1991	Carries A645 road	Bridge_over_River_Aire_-_geograph.org.uk_-_2275046

== Gallery ==
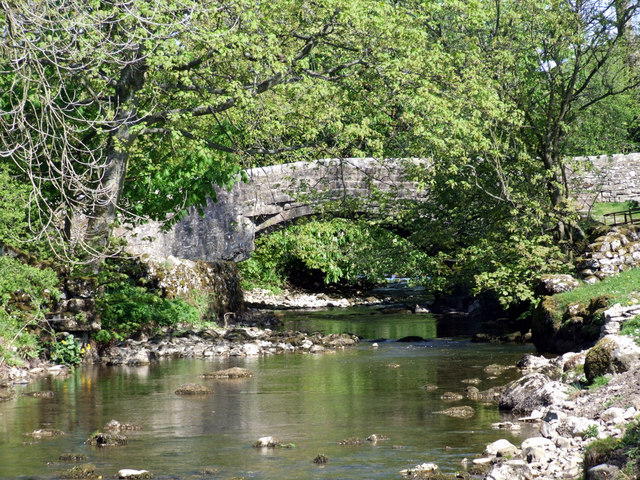
Bridge over the Aire at Hanlith

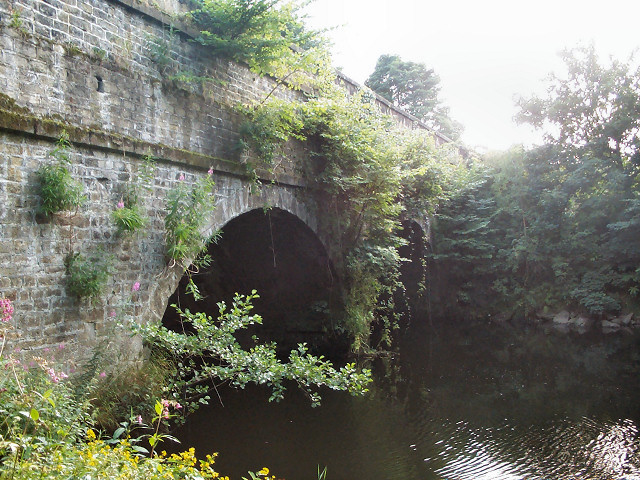
Dowley Gap aqueduct

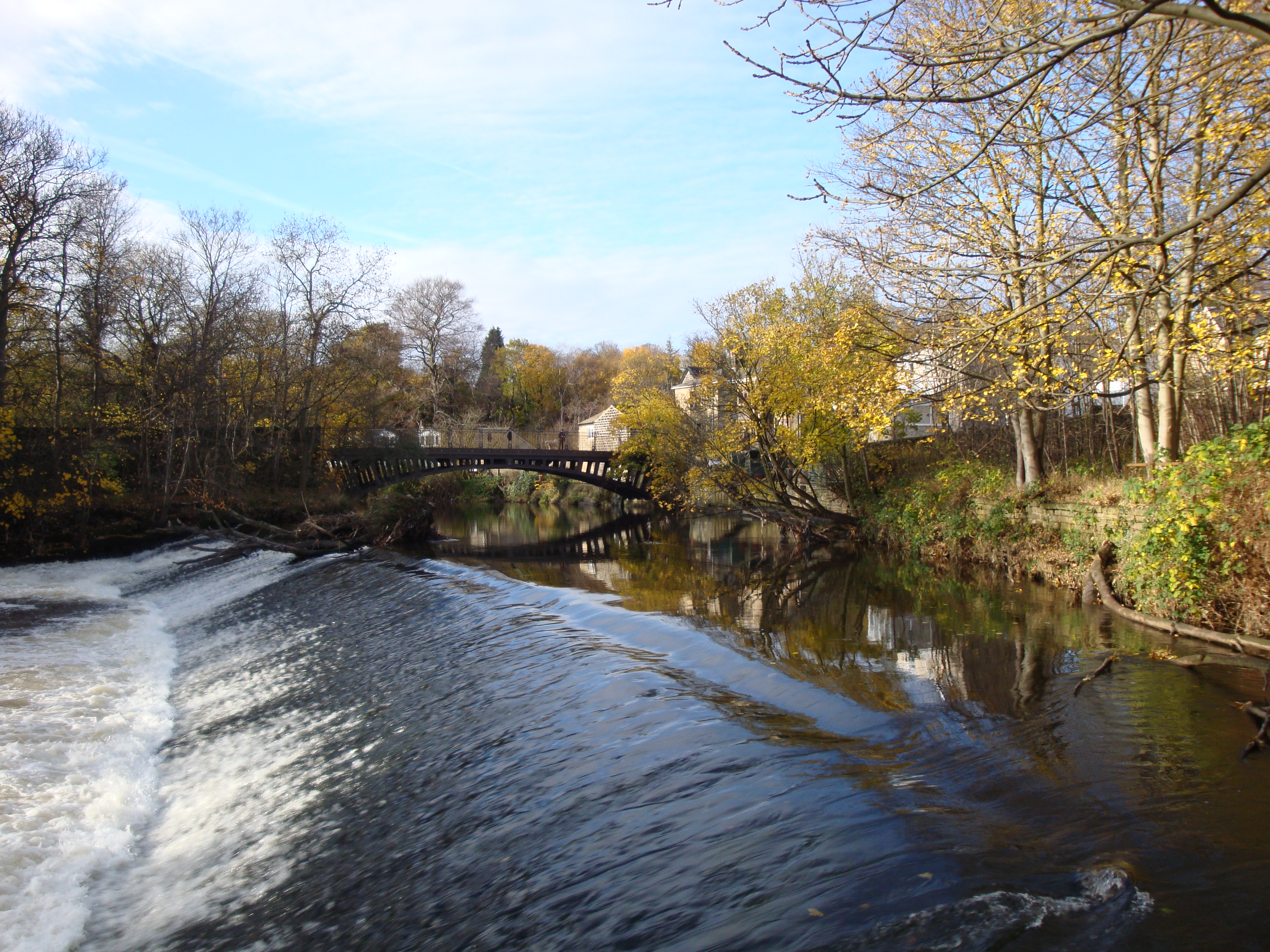
Pollard Bridge and Weir on River Aire, Newlay, Horsforth West Yorkshire

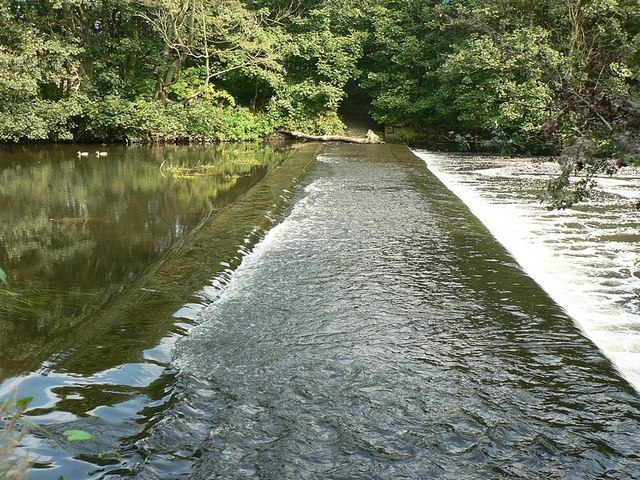
Ford across the River Aire, Kirkstall

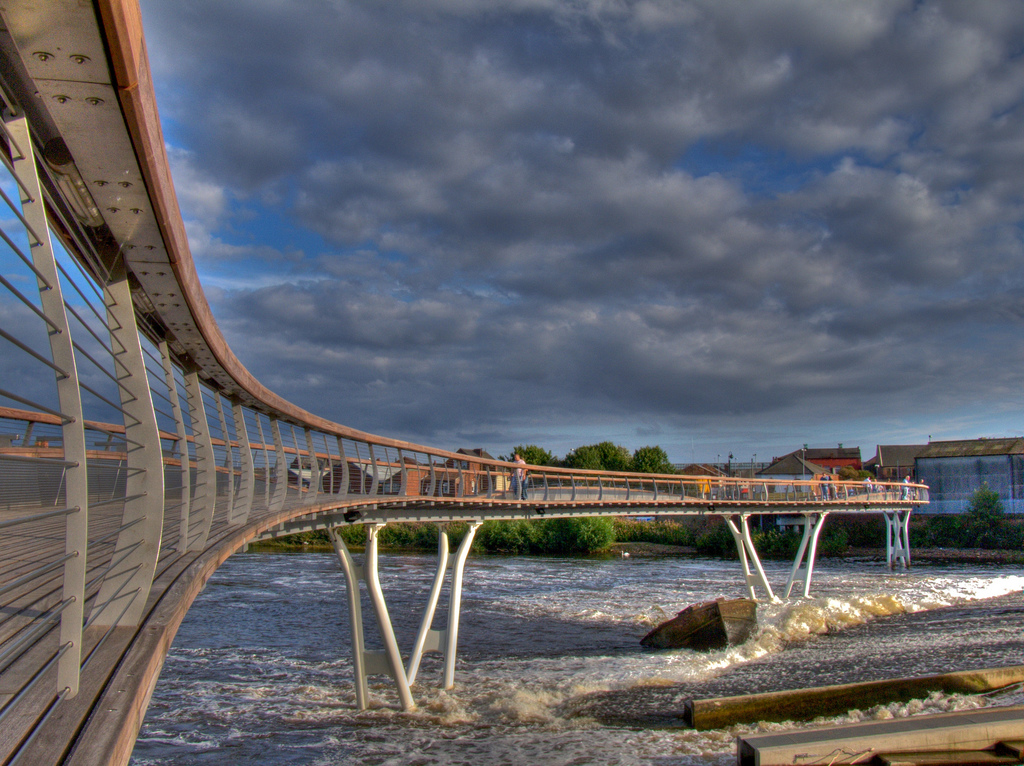
Castleford-bridge

== See also ==
- List of crossings of the River Calder
