= Brighouse =

Town in West Yorkshire, England

Coordinates: 53.707°N 1.794°W

- Town
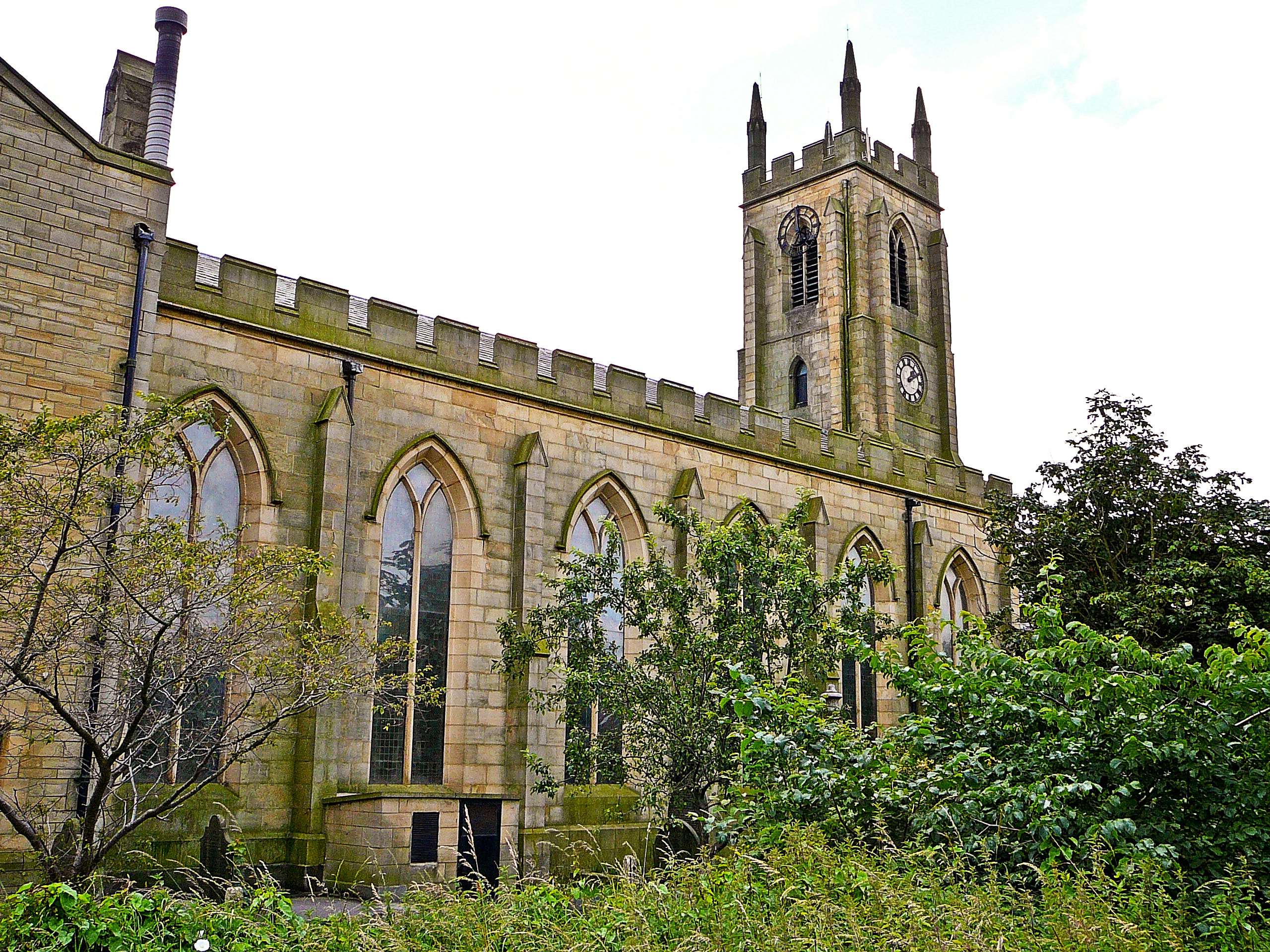
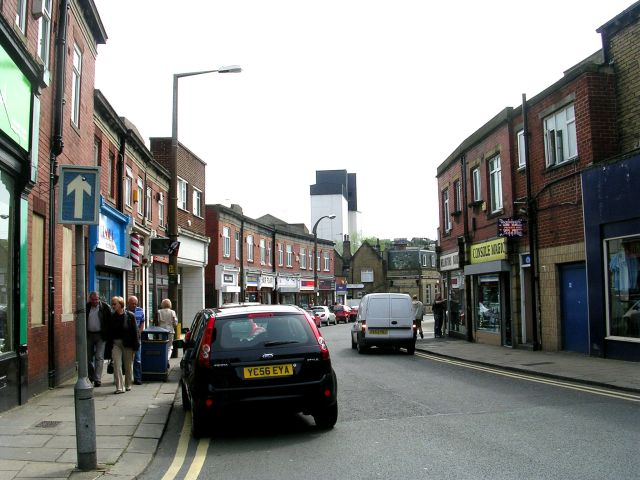
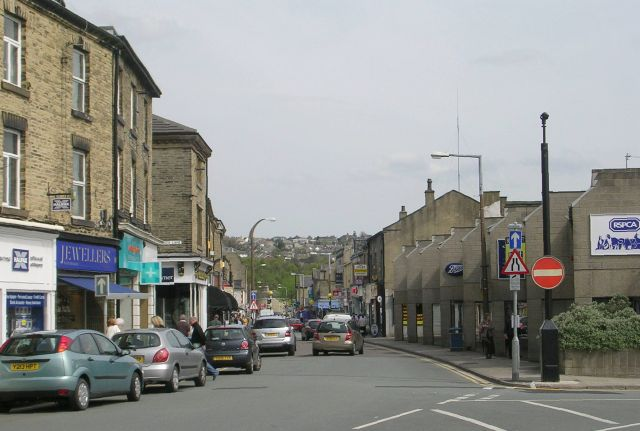
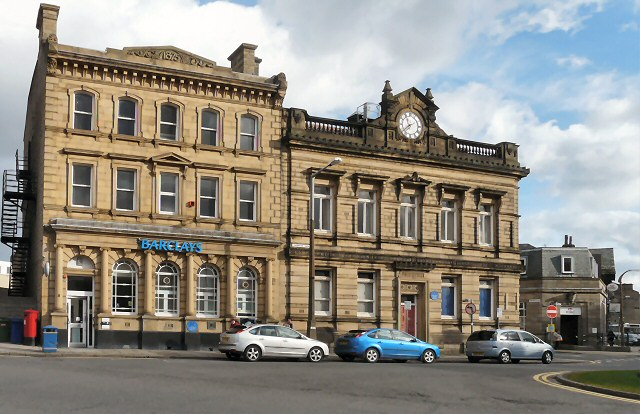
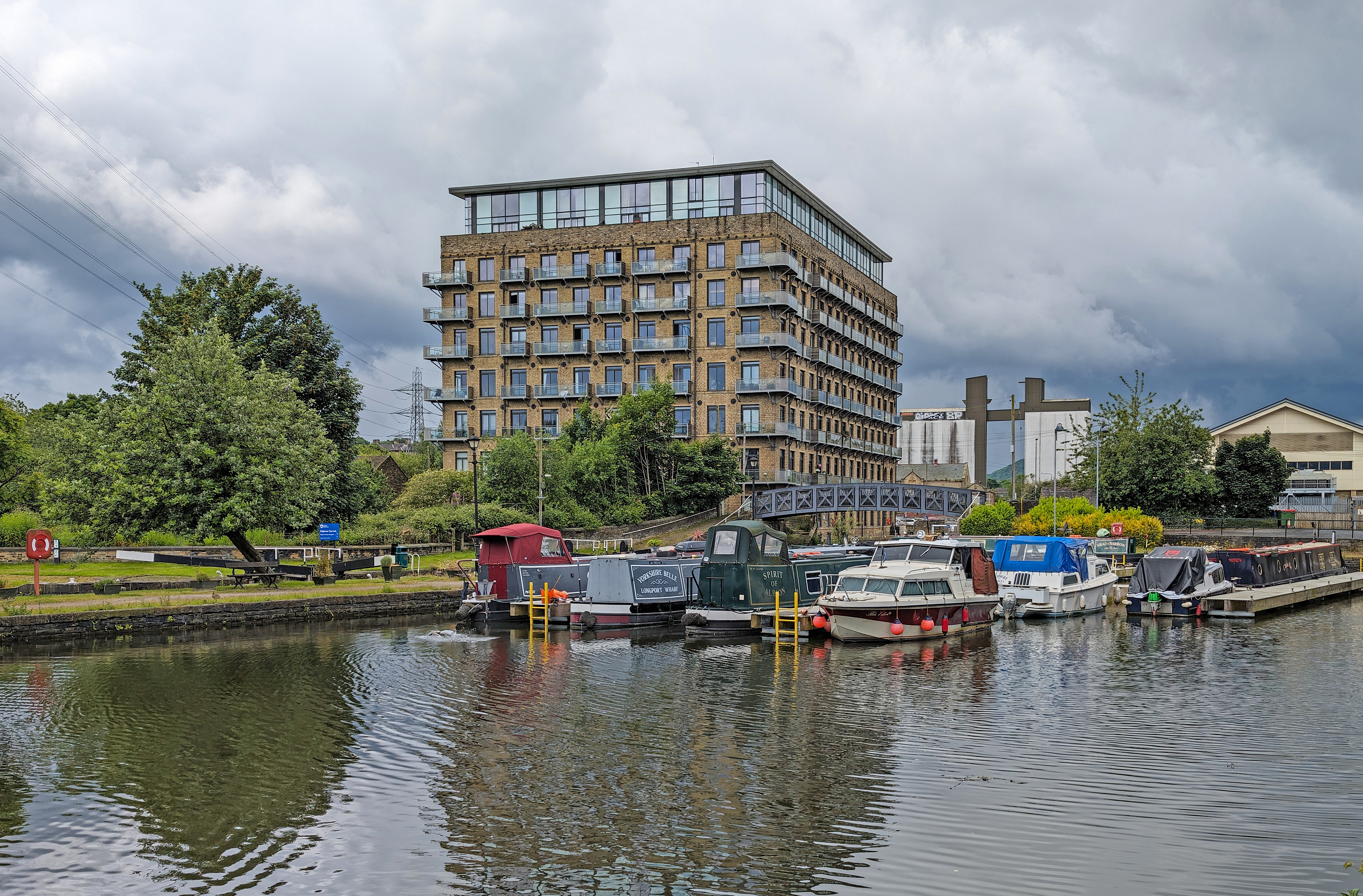
- St Martin’s Church Market Street Commercial Street Former Town Hall Brighouse Basin

- Location within West Yorkshire
- Population: 32,360 (2001) (Brighouse/Rastrick urban area)
- OS grid reference: SE135235
  - London: 150 mi (240 km) SSE
- Metropolitan borough: Calderdale
- Metropolitan county: West Yorkshire
- Region: Yorkshire and the Humber
- Country: England
- Sovereign state: United Kingdom
- Post town: BRIGHOUSE
- Postcode district: HD6
- Dialling code: 01484
- Police: West Yorkshire
- Fire: West Yorkshire
- Ambulance: Yorkshire
- UK Parliament: Calder Valley

Brighouse (/ˈbrɪɡhaʊs/, locally also /ˈbrɪɡaʊs/) is a town within the metropolitan borough of Calderdale, in West Yorkshire, England. Historically within the West Riding of Yorkshire, it is situated on the River Calder, 4 miles (6.4 km) east of Halifax. It is served by Junction 25 of the M62 motorway and Brighouse railway station on the Caldervale Line and Huddersfield Line. In the town centre is a mooring basin on the Calder and Hebble Navigation. The United Kingdom Census 2001 gave the Brighouse / Rastrick subdivision of the West Yorkshire Urban Area a population of 32,360. The Brighouse ward of Calderdale Council had a population of 11,195 at the 2011 Census. Brighouse has an HD6 postcode, despite being associated with Halifax for local government.

The name Brighouse (or "Bridge House") originates from a building on (or close to) the bridge over the River Calder. In its early history, it was a hamlet of the nearby village of Rastrick.

Brighouse is twinned with Lüdenscheid in Germany, the link beginning with an exchange by Brighouse Children's Theatre in 1950 followed by a civic twinning charter in 1960.

== History ==
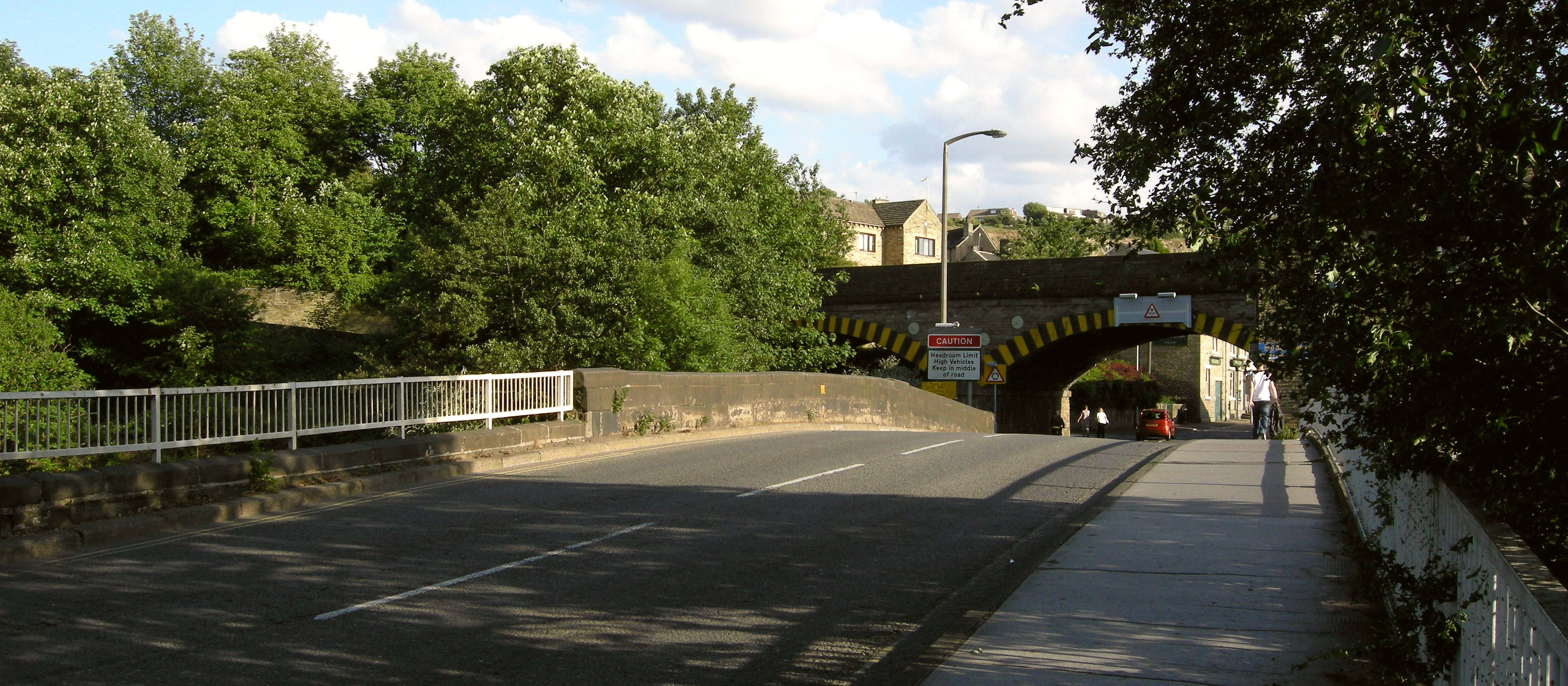
Rastrick Bridge

There was a river crossing called Snake Hill Ford across the Calder – believed to have formed part of the Roman route between Wakefield and Manchester. A wooden structure called Rastrick Bridge was recorded in 1275. The bridge was replaced by another built with timber donated by John Hanson in 1514. Hanson's son funded a stone replacement for this bridge in 1558. The river provided power for the flour milling industry and the textile mills. Brighouse's industry received a boost through the construction of the Calder and Hebble Navigation, started in 1757 by the engineer John Smeaton. The town was incorporated in 1893.

The Halifax and Huddersfield Turnpike Act 1824 (5 Geo. 4. c. ciii) allowed for the building of Calder Bridge, or Brighouse Bridge, over the river on what was to become the A641 road; tolls were abolished on the bridge in 1875 and extensive widening work was undertaken in 1905 and 1999 (both of these latter dates being commemorated in dedication stones on the bridge).

== Governance ==
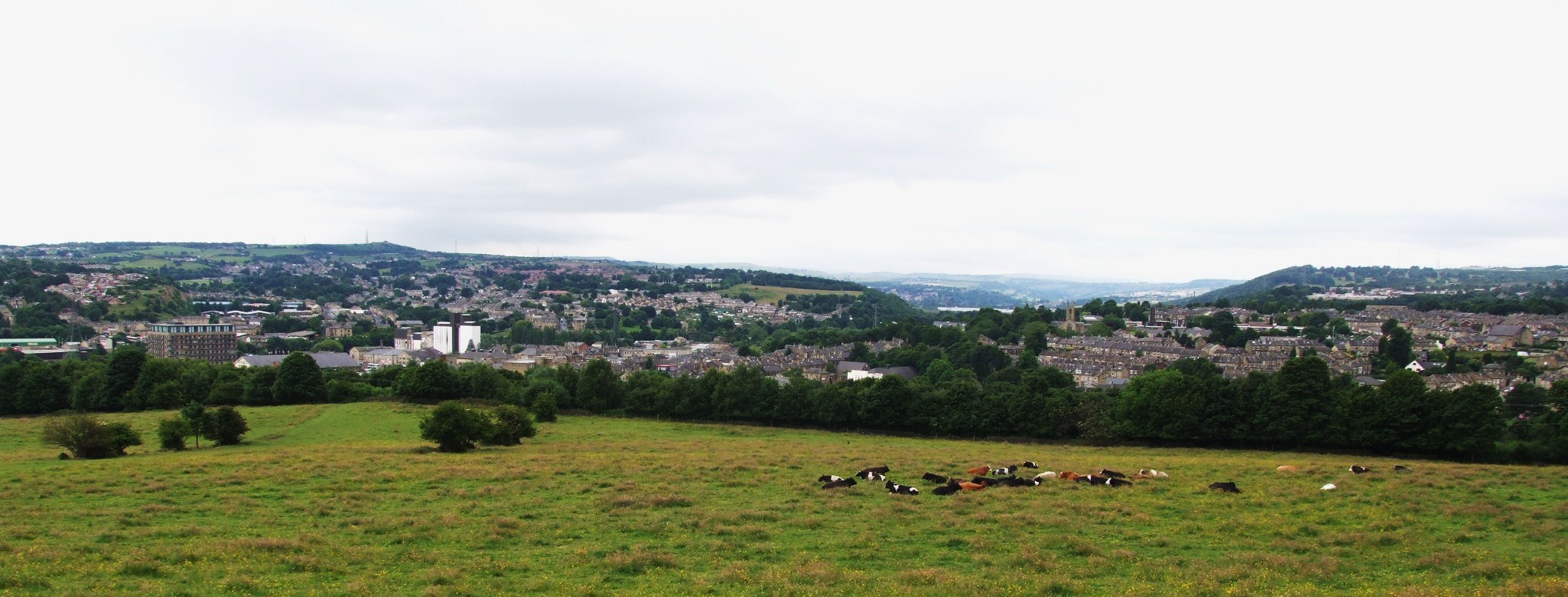
Brighouse, viewed from Thornhills Lane, Clifton

Brighouse was historically part of the township of Hipperholme with Brighouse in the large ancient parish of Halifax. The township became a civil parish in 1866, but was abolished in 1894 and divided: Brighouse became a municipal borough (and civil parish), Hipperholme became an urban district and Norwood Green and Coley became a civil parish in Halifax Rural District. The Municipal Borough of Brighouse was expanded in 1915 when Rastrick was absorbed, and in 1937 when Clifton CP, Hipperholme UD, Norwood Green and Coley CP and part of Southowram UD were added. Brighouse borough and civil parish were abolished in 1974 when it became part of Calderdale Metropolitan Borough. The mayor's mace was removed in 1974 to the Town Hall, Halifax, where it is displayed in the mayor's parlour to denote the authority of the Halifax mayor.

=== Brighouse Town Board ===
Calderdale Council established Town Boards to assist with regenerating Calderdale's Town Centres. The boards are made up of local councillors and community representatives. The first Brighouse Town Board meeting (28 March 2017) appointed Councillors from Brighouse, Hipperholme & Lightcliffe, Rastrick Wards, and community members, who represent local business and residents. Brighouse Town Board works with public, private and voluntary organisations, and takes a strategic view of the needs and opportunities of the local area.

== Buildings ==
The town's mills have undergone an extensive programme of renovation and become loft-style apartments.

Brighouse Library is a large building and in addition to its normal lending library services provides facilities for language courses, internet access and fax facilities. Like most public buildings wheelchair access is provided. There is also a small cafe and a lift for access to all floors.

The main shopping streets are Commercial Street and Bethel Street. In early 2000, a financial agreement made between Tesco and Brighouse Sports Club, allowed for a huge new Tesco superstore to be built on the site of the former club, and the old Tesco became Wilkos. The deal also enabled the sports club to build new premises almost a mile away (1.5 km) on land at Russell Way, Bailiff Bridge.

The Old Ship Inn has a painted legend along the front, saying that the exterior timbers were salvaged from an old ship. Originally called The Prince of Wales, the building was rebuilt from timbers reclaimed from HMS Donegal in 1926.

The ROKT building on Mill Royd Street is the UK's tallest outdoor man-made climbing wall, at 36m tall it is taller than the Tower of London, although it is temporarily closed as a result of flooding and financial losses during the COVID 19 Pandemic.

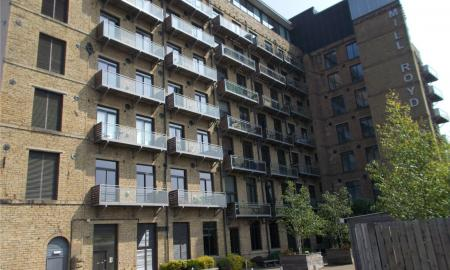
Brighouse Mill Royd Mill flats

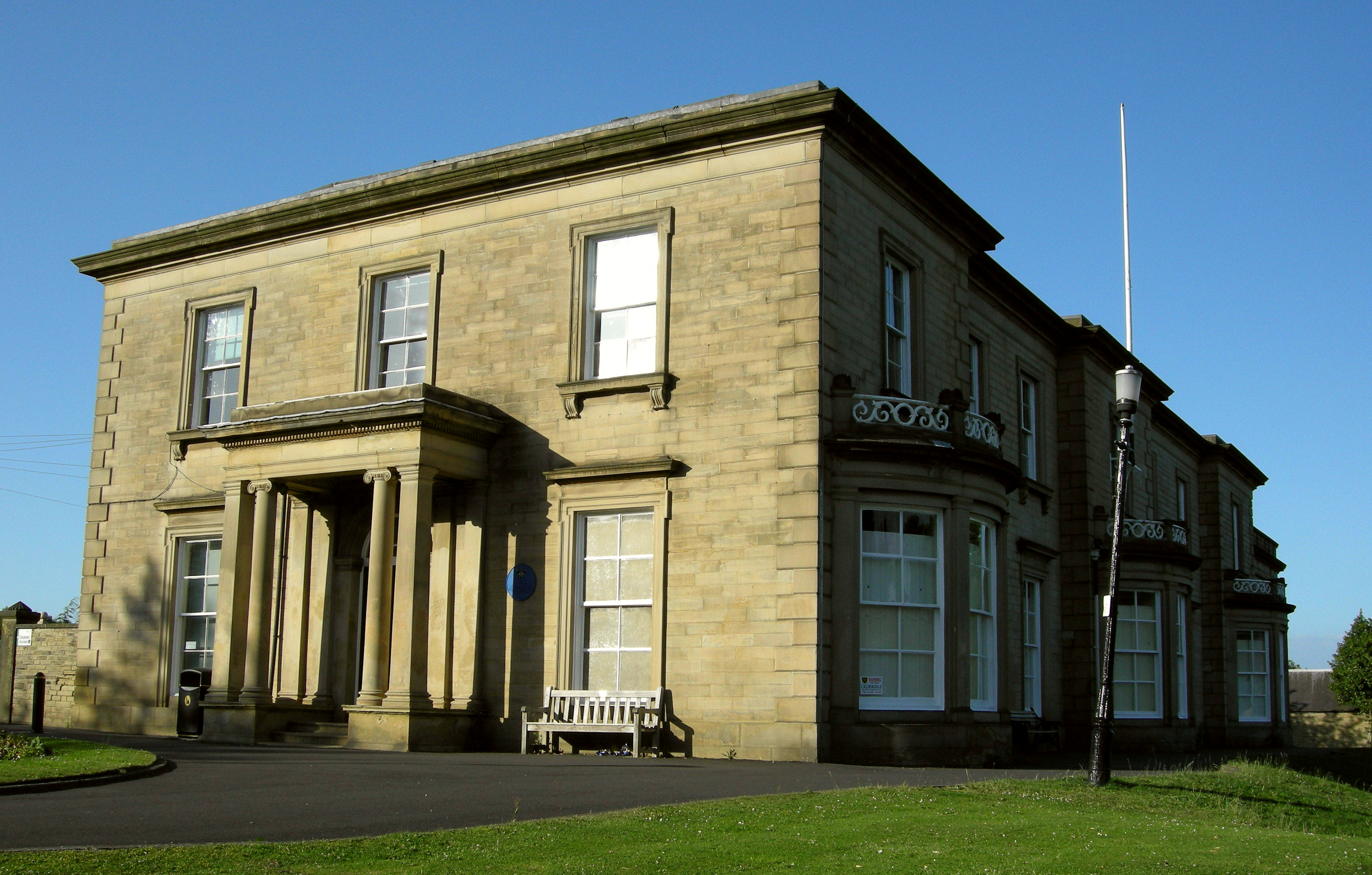
Brighouse Library

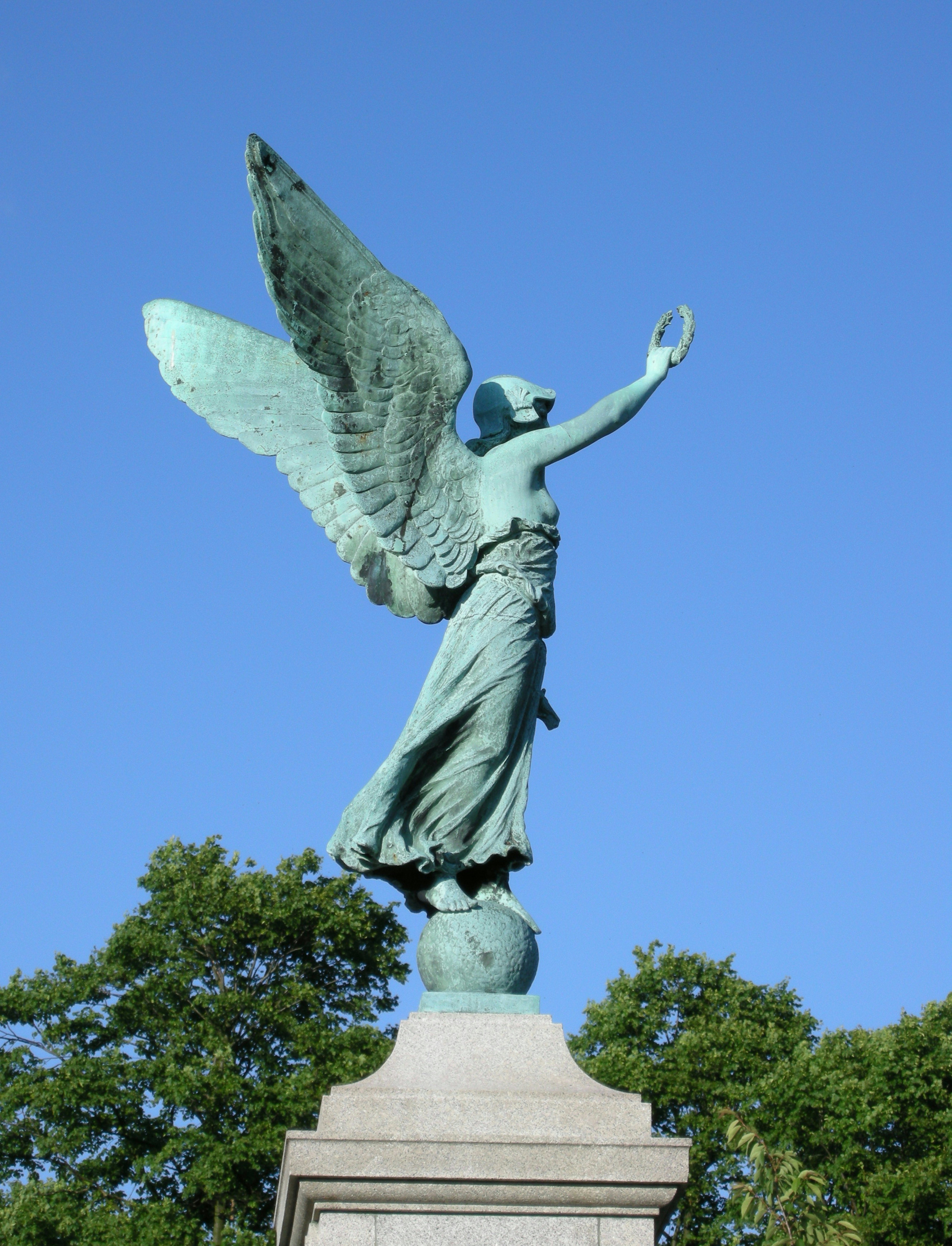
Winged Victory on war memorial in library grounds

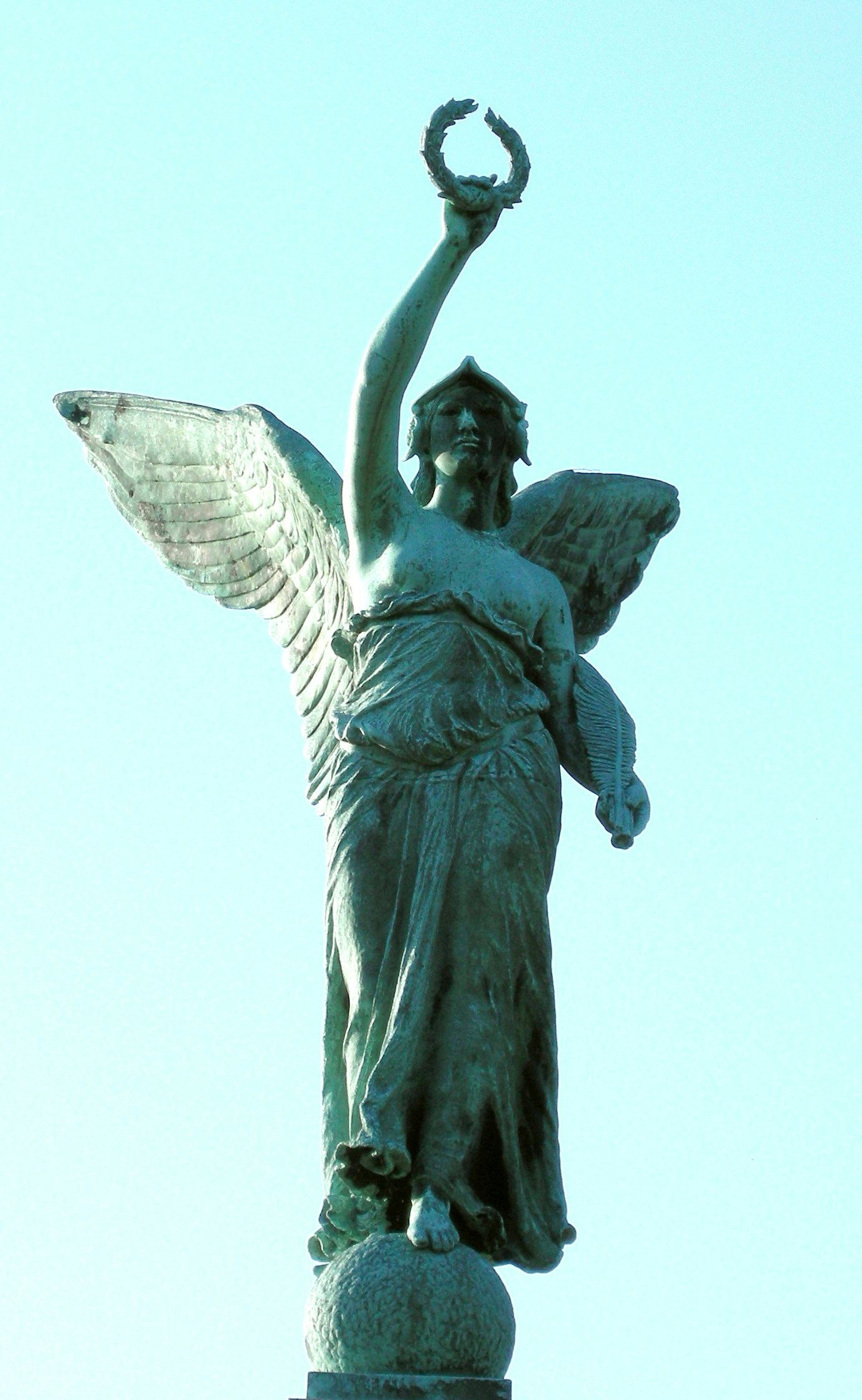
War memorial statue, front view

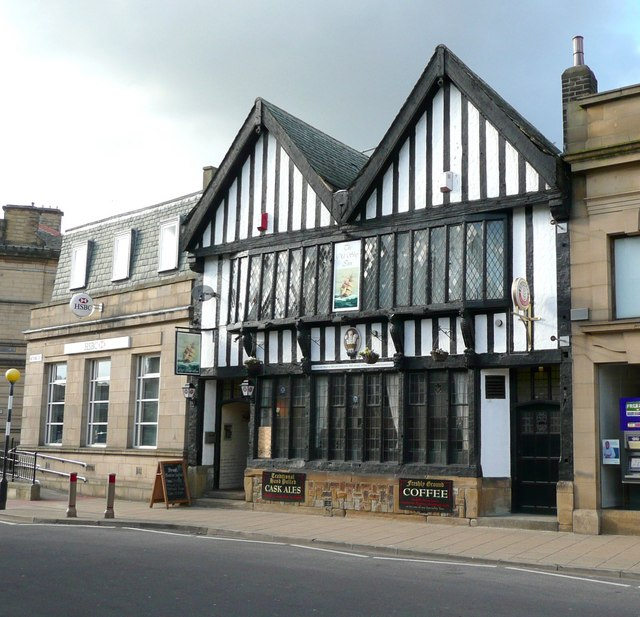
Old Ship public house

== Religion ==
=== Brighouse Central Methodist Church ===
The Central Methodist Church is situated at the west end of Brighouse backing onto the Lüdenscheid Link with a side entry at the lower part of Parsonage Lane. The frontage overlooks a small car park. The site was acquired in 1895 and the current church and Sunday School were constructed in 1905 and opened in 1907.

=== Brighouse Masjid ===
Brighouse Masjid is a Sunni mosque.

=== St James's Church ===
St James's Church, which was a chapel of ease for the Parish Church of Saint Martin in Brighouse, opened in 1870, with a congregation of 450. An organ was installed in the same year. Two stained glass windows from the William Morris factory, designed by Edward Burne-Jones, were installed in July 1871. Further windows were added at later dates by other designers. In 1900 William Camm the organist paid for the fitting of a window in memory of his mother. A further window commemorates the curate, Rev. Alban Bodley Mace (1915), who was killed in action at Salonika during 1916, serving with the Allied Expeditionary Force. The chancel screen was designed by G. H. Woodhouse of Manchester. St James Church was last used on 27 December 1970, and then demolished, with the land used for residential properties. The stained glass windows were removed and taken into the care of the Cliffe Castle Museum in Keighley, where they can now be viewed.

=== St Joseph's Church ===
St Joseph's Catholic Church was built in the early 1900s, on Martin Street. In 1879 a primary school was established, using the church hall from Monday to Friday. It remained in use until 4 September 1961, when a new school was built on Finkil Street. The church is aligned with St Patrick's Catholic Church in Elland.

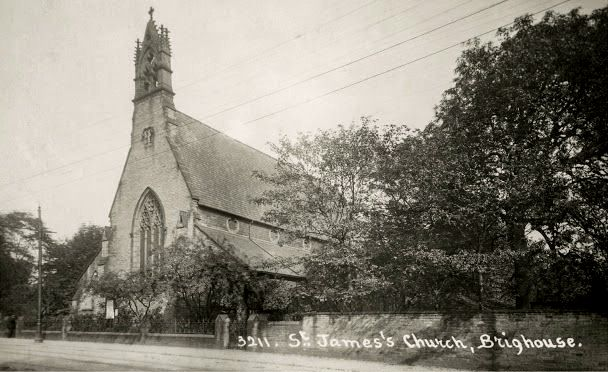
Former St James Church

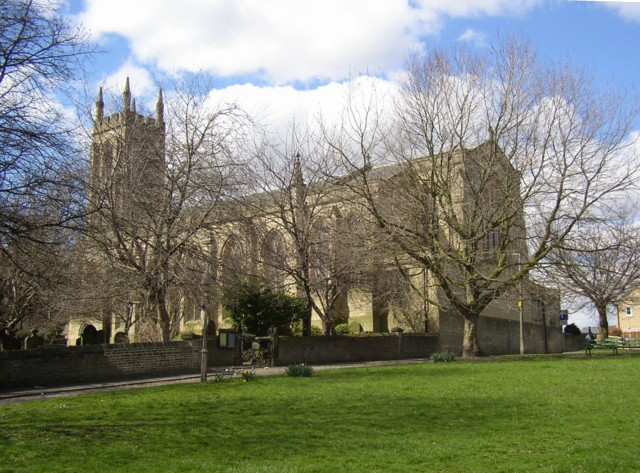
St Martin's Church

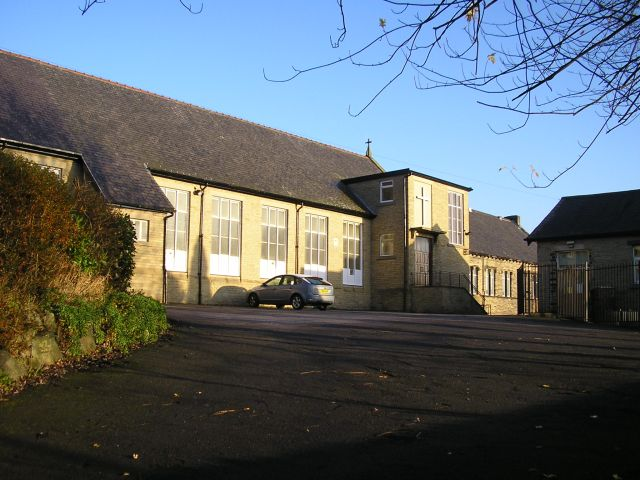
St Joseph's Roman Catholic Church

== Arts and media ==
Smith Art Gallery is in the Brighouse Library and features many paintings from the Victorian era displayed in the main hall, in addition to a changing programme of exhibitions of artwork by local artists.

The "Calderdale Nightingale", Susan Sunderland, was born in Brighouse in 1819 and lived here all her life. She never sought fame but was considered one of the best singers in the country and she sang concerts including those for Queen Victoria.

Brighouse was the original home of the Brighouse and Rastrick Brass Band, founded in 1881 and associated with neighbouring Rastrick. They originally formed under the name the Brighouse and Rastrick Temperance Brass Band taking their current title in the early 20th century. They are currently based next to Brighouse High School in Hove Edge, just north of Brighouse. In 1977 the band recorded "The Floral Dance" which reached Number 2 in the UK Top 40 and stayed there for 6 weeks. In 1968, the band won the inaugural Brass Band World Championship, and in 1993 became the first Yorkshire team to win the All England Masters Brass Band Championship, a feat repeated in 1998. The band won the National Brass Band Championship Finals in 1946, 1968, 1969, 1973, 1980, 1997, 1998, 2010, 2011 and 2017, and the European Championships in 1981 and 1998.

The town is also home to the Yorkshire Co-op Brass band, formed in 1999 by merger of the Jayess '87 and Jayess Queensbury bands.

The area is home to rock band Embrace, who have had three UK number one albums. The town is mentioned in "It's Grim Up North" by the Justified Ancients of Mu Mu (The JAMS).

A local drum & bugle corps, Conquest Alliance was formed, in 1985, by the merger of the Northern Skyryders and Brighouse RBL (Legion). The following year, 1986, Conquest Alliance appeared on the Drum Corp United Kingdom (DCUK) field of competition and were declared co-champions of the DCUK. In 1987 the corps was placed 1st, 5th in 1988, 2nd in 1989, and 4th in 1990. The corps disbanded in 1990.

=== Media ===
Local news and television programmes are provided by BBC Yorkshire and ITV Yorkshire. Television signals are received from the Emley Moor TV transmitter.

Local radio stations are BBC Radio Leeds, Heart Yorkshire, Capital Yorkshire, Hits Radio West Yorkshire, Greatest Hits Radio West Yorkshire and Phoenix Radio, a community based radio station.

The local newspapers are the Brighouse Echo, the Halifax Courier, the Mirfield Reporter and the Huddersfield Daily Examiner

== Sport ==
Brighouse Rangers Rugby league Club, founded in 1878, are based at the Brighouse Sports Club Complex on Russell Way (Off A641 Bradford Road) between Brighouse town centre and Bailiff Bridge. The club competes at amateur level in the Pennine League's premier Division and fields a reserve side in Division Six. There is a junior section for under 18's, down to Under 8's, and a ladies side.

Before the 1895 schism in English rugby, William Nicholl played rugby union for England, and Brighouse Rangers. After the schism, Brighouse Rangers became a founder member of the Northern Rugby Football Union (now Rugby Football League), and the first Northern Rugby Football Union chairman was Mr. H. H. Waller from the club. Brighouse Rangers played from 1895–96 to 1905–06 winning the Yorkshire League in the 1896–97 season. Although finishing last in the 14-club elite league in the 1901–02 season, the club was not relegated as the league expanded to 18 clubs. In the 1902–03 season Brighouse finished 18th and was relegated. After finishing bottom of the 31-club recombined league in the 1905–06 season, the club withdrew from the Northern Union.

As of the 2023–24 season, Brighouse Town F.C. play in the Pitching In Northern Premier League Division One East at level 8 of the National League System (also known as 'The Football Pyramid'). Brighouse had its own Sunday League football competition, which in the 2007–08 season had one division of 10 teams. Junction (Rastrick) were crowned champions on 20 April 2008. The Brighouse & District Sunday Football League merged with Halifax Sunday League in 2010. There are many Junior football teams in the area too such as Brighouse Juniors, which was started by parents in 1989, who go from Under 6's up to Under 17's.

The town is on the route of the 50 mile Calderdale Way circular walk around the hills and valleys of Calderdale.

== Transport ==
=== Road ===
The A641 northward links Brighouse with Bradford and southward with Huddersfield. The A644 runs eastward out of Brighouse to Junction 25 of the M62 and Dewsbury. In the opposite direction, the A644 leaves Brighouse to the north-west towards Hipperholme, where it crosses the A58 Leeds-Halifax road, and continues through Queensbury to meet the A629 for Keighley. The A643 and A6025 provide less important local links, although the A643 is an alternative route through to Leeds.

A bypass, originally called Elland Road, then renamed Lüdenscheid Link in the 1980s, after Brighouse's twin town in Germany, was constructed in the 1970s to clear heavy traffic from the narrow streets in the town centre; construction started in March 1976 by Tarmac, to cost £2m, with the finish at the end of 1977. Part of the bypass opened on June 9 1977. Another section opened in early August 1977, and was largely open by November 1977.

Bus services operate frequently to Halifax like the 549 and 548 and Huddersfield like the 549 and X63. Plus Bradford by using the 686, X63 and the 688 which runs at the weekend. There is also a half hourly service to Leeds, the Arriva run service 254 (hourly on a Sunday).These are coordinated by West Yorkshire Metro. Services are operated by First Bradford, First Calderdale & Huddersfield, Team Pennine and South Pennine Community Transport. Brighouse bus station has been refurbished with funding from Metro and re-opened in May 2009. The bus station is between Commercial Street and the bypass. The bus station and some bus stops in the Brighouse area are equipped with Real Time Passenger Information Screens.

=== Rail ===
Brighouse railway station reopened in 2000 and provides the town with access to the National Rail network. All services are sponsored by Metro and provided by Northern. The current service is part of both the Huddersfield Line and the Calder Valley line, with services on the Huddersfield Line between Leeds and Manchester Victoria via Dewsbury and services on the Caldervale Line between Leeds and Huddersfield via Bradford and Halifax. Direct services to London Kings Cross are also available, with four services per day provided by Grand Central.

=== Water ===
The Calder and Hebble Navigation links Brighouse with Wakefield (junction with the Aire and Calder Navigation), Mirfield (junction with the Huddersfield Broad Canal) and Sowerby Bridge (junction with the Rochdale Canal).

== Gallery ==
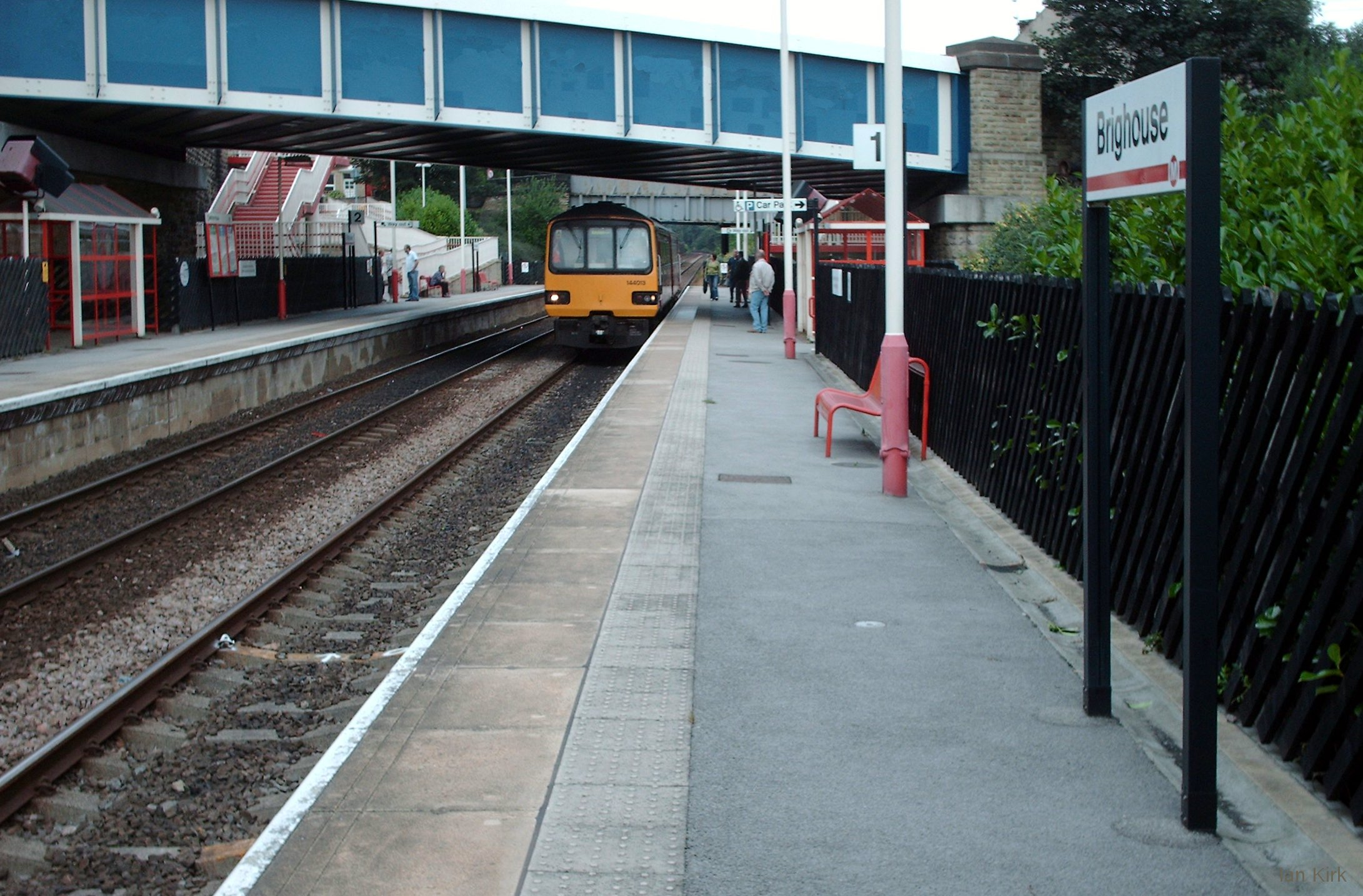
Brighouse railway station

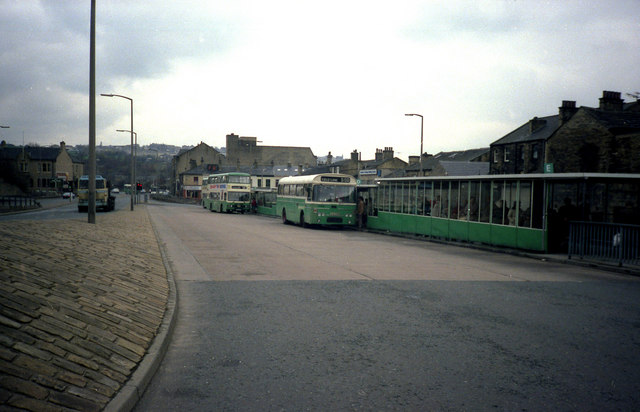
Brighouse bus station (1985)

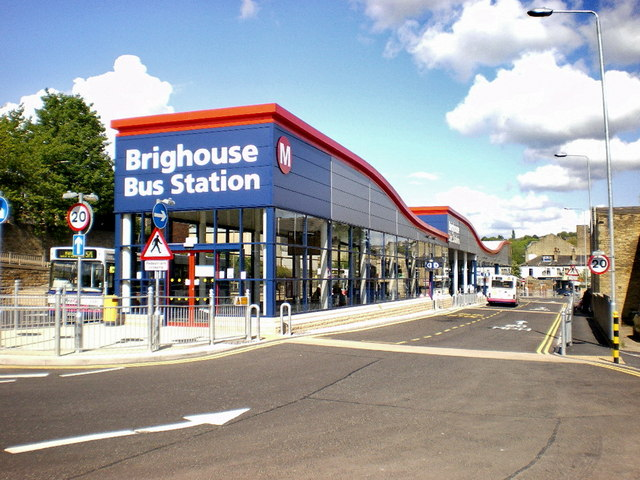
Brighouse bus station (2009)

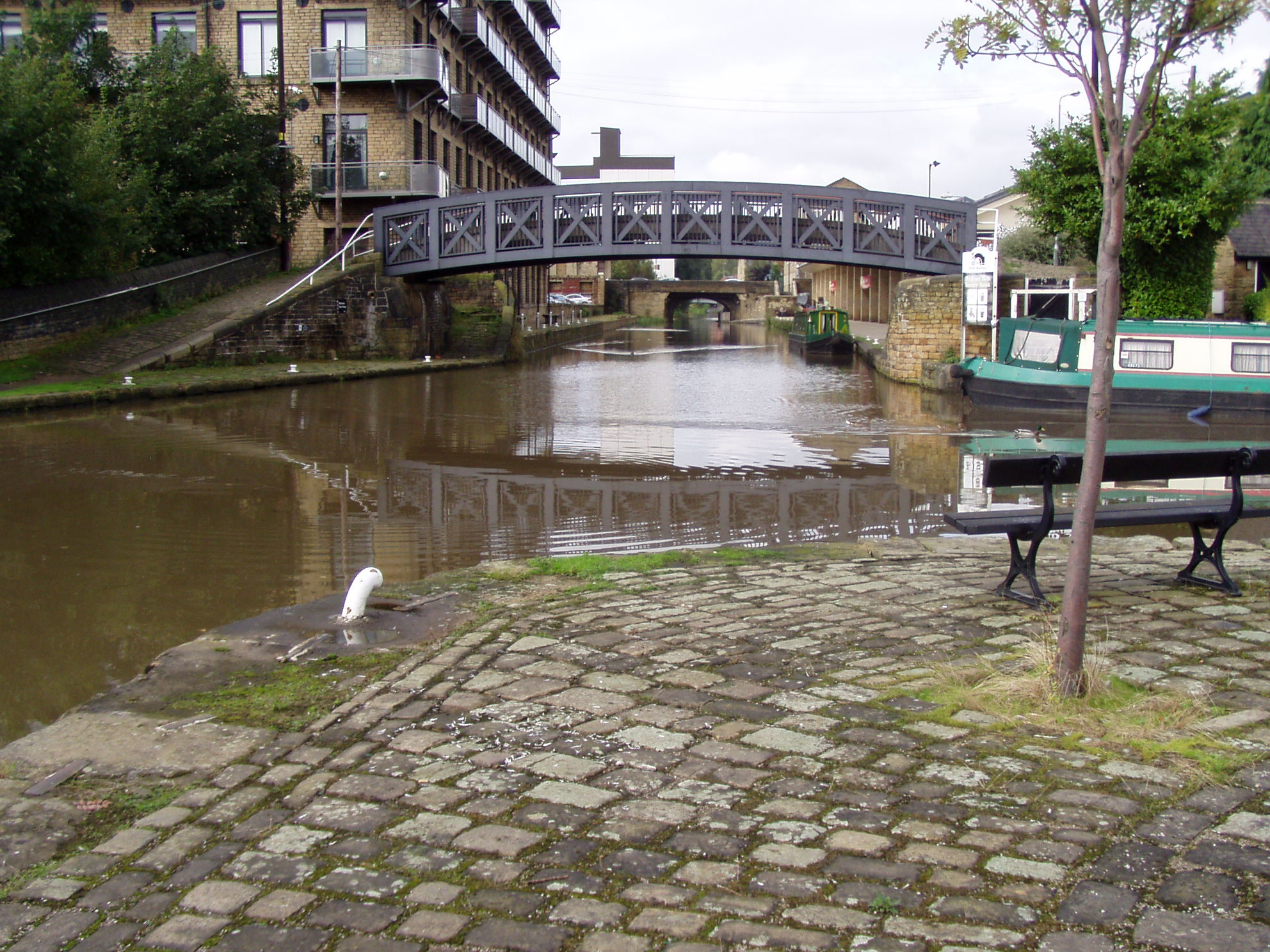
Brighouse Basin on the Calder and Hebble Navigation

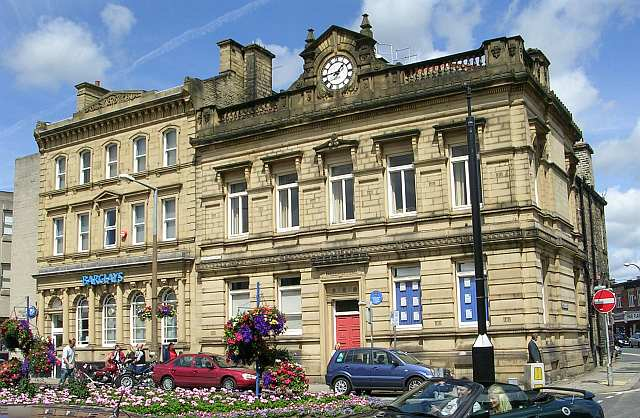
Brighouse Town Hall, built 1898

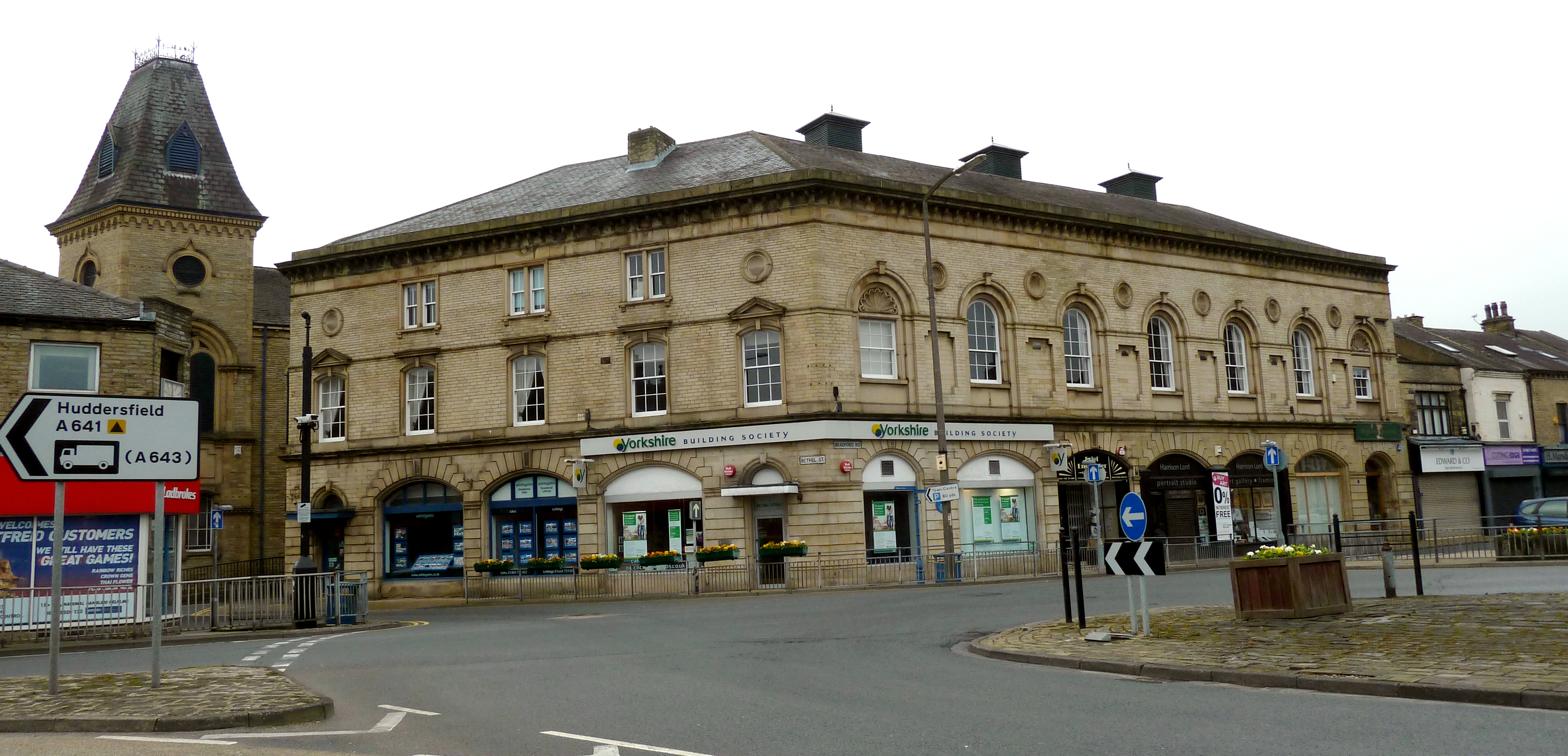
Civic Hall, by Mallinson and Barber, 1866

== Notable people ==
- Katie Ormerod, Olympic snowboarder
- Divina de Campo, Ru Paul's Drag Race UK Season 1 Runner Up.

== See also ==
- Listed buildings in Brighouse
