= Grade II* listed buildings in Bradford =

There are over 20,000 Grade II* listed buildings in England. This page is a list of these buildings in the metropolitan borough of Bradford in West Yorkshire.

== List of buildings ==
Name	Location	Type	Completed (Note: The date given is the date used by Historic England as significant for the initial building or that of an important part in the structure's description.)	Date designated	Grid ref. (Note: Sometimes known as OSGB36, the grid reference is based on the British national grid reference system used by the Ordnance Survey.) Geo-coordinates	Entry number (Note: The "List Entry Number" is a unique number assigned to each listed building and scheduled monument by Historic England.)	Image
Friends' Meeting House	Addingham	Friends' meeting house	1689	10 September 1954	SE0761051790; 53°57′44″N 1°53′08″W	1199556	Friends' Meeting House More images
Baildon Hall	Baildon	Cross-wing house	Late 15th century	25 May 1966	SE1553039347; 53°51′00″N 1°45′56″W	1199151	Upload Photo
Harden Hall	Harden	House	Early–mid-17th century	9 August 1966	SE0866337846; 53°50′12″N 1°52′11″W	1134140	Harden Hall More images
Church of St Michael and All Angels	Haworth, Cross Roads and Stanbury	Church	16th century	23 February 1955	SE0298737215; 53°49′52″N 1°57′22″W	1283403	Church of St Michael and All Angels More images
Ponden Hall	Scar Top, Haworth, Cross Roads and Stanbury	Farmhouse	1801	23 February 1955	SD9867737266; 53°49′54″N 2°01′18″W	1313937	Ponden Hall More images
Church of St Margaret	Ilkley	Parish church	1878–79	20 May 1976	SE1149047251; 53°55′17″N 1°49′36″W	1200770	Church of St Margaret More images
Low Hall	Ilkley	House	17th century	18 July 1949	SE1150448524; 53°55′58″N 1°49′35″W	1314214	Low Hall
Parish Church of All Saints	Ilkley	Parish church	13th century	18 July 1949	SE1164547825; 53°55′35″N 1°49′27″W	1133506	Parish Church of All Saints More images
Mill buildings at Low Mills	Keighley	Mill	Late 18th century	12 February 1979	SE0655241165; 53°52′00″N 1°54′07″W	1200162	Mill buildings at Low Mills More images
Menston Old Hall (Fairfax Hall)	Menston	Detached house	17th century	18 July 1949	SE1673244023; 53°53′32″N 1°44′49″W	1314210	Upload Photo
Barn, 15 metres south of Holden Gate Farmhouse	Silsden	Barn	1641	27 September 1965	SE0661544200; 53°53′38″N 1°54′03″W	1267373	Upload Photo
Waterloo Mill and attached engine house	Silsden	Mill	1867–84	25 January 1985	SE0431646149; 53°54′41″N 1°56′09″W	1266636	Waterloo Mill and attached engine house More images
18–26 Bradley Road	Silsden	House	1682	27 September 1965	SE0401246651; 53°54′58″N 1°56′25″W	1223261	18–26 Bradley Road More images
Church of All Saints	Little Horton, Trident	Church	1864	9 August 1983	SE1569932050; 53°47′04″N 1°45′48″W	1207967	Church of All Saints More images
30 and 31 Little Horton Green (Little Horton Hall)	Little Horton, Trident	House	Mid- to late 17th century	4 September 1952	SE1558132116; 53°47′06″N 1°45′54″W	1133011	30 and 31 Little Horton Green (Little Horton Hall) More images
54 Little Horton Lane	Trident	Villa	Circa 1850–60	9 August 1983	SE1598932553; 53°47′21″N 1°45′32″W	1133017	Upload Photo
Bolton Old Hall	Gaisby, Wrose	House	1627	4 September 1952	SE1663336285; 53°49′21″N 1°44′56″W	1314357	Bolton Old Hall More images
Bolton Old Hall Cottage	Gaisby, Wrose	Timber-framed house	Early to mid-17th century	18 July 1975	SE1663836294; 53°49′22″N 1°44′55″W	1115592	Upload Photo
Aldersley Farmhouse	Allerton Upper Green	Farmhouse	Latter part of 17th century	4 September 1952	SE1030333759; 53°48′00″N 1°50′42″W	1133647	Aldersley Farmhouse More images
Barn immediately east of New Close Farmhouse	Nab Wood	Aisled barn	17th century	7 May 1976	SE1235036946; 53°49′43″N 1°48′50″W	1133576	Upload Photo
Behrens Warehouse	Little Germany	Warehouse	1873	9 August 1983	SE1695433118; 53°47′39″N 1°44′39″W	1314395	Behrens Warehouse More images
Bradford Reform Synagogue	Manningham	Synagogue	1880–81	6 December 1989	SE1574833882; 53°48′04″N 1°45′45″W	1227613	Bradford Reform Synagogue More images
Building immediately to north of present Home Farmhouse at Esholt Hall Home Farm	Esholt	Farmhouse	1691	4 September 1952	SE1905639612; 53°51′09″N 1°42′42″W	1133156	Upload Photo
Church of All Saints	Bingley	Church	Late 15th century	9 August 1966	SE1053939474; 53°51′05″N 1°50′29″W	1200095	Church of All Saints More images
Church of St Clement	Barkerend	Church	1892–94	9 June 1981	SE1779133549; 53°47′53″N 1°43′53″W	1184649	Church of St Clement More images
Church of St Cuthbert (Roman Catholic)	Bradford	Roman Catholic church	1890–91	2 September 1998	SE1451135117; 53°48′44″N 1°46′52″W	1376263	Church of St Cuthbert (Roman Catholic) More images
Church of St John	Bierley	Chapel	1766	4 September 1952	SE1773730496; 53°46′14″N 1°43′57″W	1314522	Church of St John More images
Dean House	Allerton Lanes	House	1605	4 September 1952	SE1116533695; 53°47′58″N 1°49′55″W	1133313	Dean House More images
Devere House	Little Germany	Warehouse	1871	9 August 1983	SE1678633094; 53°47′38″N 1°44′48″W	1133650	Devere House More images
Esholt Hall with terrace and adjoining conservatory	Esholt Estate	Country house	1706–07	4 September 1952	SE1885839670; 53°51′11″N 1°42′53″W	1133190	Esholt Hall with terrace and adjoining conservatory
Feversham Street First School	Bradford	School	1873	9 August 1983	SE1714532926; 53°47′33″N 1°44′28″W	1133162	Feversham Street First School More images
Frizingley Hall	Frizinghall	House	c.1730–50	9 August 1983	SE1523235817; 53°49′06″N 1°46′12″W	1133166	Upload Photo
Frizley Old Hall	Frizinghall	House	1727	9 August 1983	SE1524535824; 53°49′07″N 1°46′12″W	1119622	Upload Photo
Gate piers at entrance to Tong Hall drive	Tong	Gate pier	18th century	4 September 1952	SE2186730510; 53°46′14″N 1°40′11″W	1133659	Gate piers at entrance to Tong Hall drive
Gawthorpe Hall including south wing	Bingley	Manor house	Mid-17th century	9 August 1966	SE1094340134; 53°51′26″N 1°50′06″W	1199532	Upload Photo
Idle Young Men's Christian Association Youth Community Centre	Idle	Sunday school	1630	4 September 1952	SE1767137941; 53°50′15″N 1°43′59″W	1133673	Idle Young Men's Christian Association Youth Community Centre More images
Ireland Bridge	Bingley	Road bridge	1686	9 August 1966	SE1052439354; 53°51′01″N 1°50′29″W	1133377	Ireland Bridge More images
Law Russell Warehouse	Little Germany	Warehouse	1873	9 August 1983	SE1676033137; 53°47′39″N 1°44′49″W	1133652	Law Russell Warehouse More images
Three Rise Locks with overflow channel	Leeds and Liverpool Canal, Bingley	Canal locks	c.1773	18 October 1985	SE1072639477; 53°51′05″N 1°50′18″W	1133361	Three Rise Locks with overflow channel More images
Two Rise Locks with overflow channel, Dowley Gap	Leeds and Liverpool Canal	Canal locks	c.1773	18 October 1985	SE1196738319; 53°50′28″N 1°49′11″W	1133359	Two Rise Locks with overflow channel, Dowley Gap More images
Leventhorpe Hall	Lower Grange	House	Late 17th century	4 September 1952	SE1171732800; 53°47′29″N 1°49′25″W	1133692	Leventhorpe Hall
Lower Bailey Fold Farmhouse	Allerton	Farmhouse	Late 17th century	4 September 1952	SE1099233969; 53°48′07″N 1°50′05″W	1314364	Lower Bailey Fold Farmhouse
Manningham Mills	Manningham	Factory	1873	14 June 1963	SE1445434910; 53°48′37″N 1°46′55″W	1314426	Manningham Mills More images
Midland Bank	Bradford	Bank (financial)	1858	9 August 1983	SE1634533210; 53°47′42″N 1°45′12″W	1133211	Midland Bank More images
Newhall West Bowling Golf Club	Newhall	House	Late 17th century	4 September 1952	SE1703530254; 53°46′06″N 1°44′35″W	1314521	Newhall West Bowling Golf Club More images
Number 74 with front garden wall and railings (also known as Brontë Birthplace)	Thornton	House	1802	4 September 1952	SE1006732756; 53°47′28″N 1°50′55″W	1132988	Number 74 with front garden wall and railings (also known as Brontë Birthplace) More images
Numbers 3 to 11 (Esholt Old Hall) and adjoining barn	Esholt	House	Late 16th century	4 September 1952	SE1820240170; 53°51′27″N 1°43′29″W	1133252	Numbers 3 to 11 (Esholt Old Hall) and adjoining barn More images
Paper Hall	Bradford	House	1643	4 September 1952	SE1691333425; 53°47′49″N 1°44′41″W	1314310	Paper Hall More images
Royds Hall	Low Moor	Cross-wing house	1656	4 September 1952	SE1435628230; 53°45′01″N 1°47′02″W	1132910	Royds Hall More images
Main L-shaped block of stable, coach house and barn enclosing the court to north of the hall outbuildings at Royds Hall	Low Moor	Barn	1663	4 September 1952	SE1434128266; 53°45′02″N 1°47′02″W	1291670	Upload Photo
Royds Hall Farmhouse	Heaton	Farmhouse	Late 17th century	4 September 1952	SE1366936069; 53°49′15″N 1°47′38″W	1133739	Upload Photo
Ryecroft Hall	Holme Shay	House	Mid-17th century	4 September 1952	SE2012230575; 53°46′16″N 1°41′46″W	1068660	Ryecroft Hall More images
Ryshworth Hall	Crossflatts	House	Late 16th century	9 August 1966	SE1007740806; 53°51′48″N 1°50′54″W	1133397	Upload Photo
Saltaire Mills – main block including sheds	Saltaire	Mill	1851–53	22 November 1966	SE1408238039; 53°50′18″N 1°47′15″W	1133523	Saltaire Mills – main block including sheds More images
Saltaire Mills – the entrance block	Saltaire	Mill	1851–53	7 March 1985	SE1397638092; 53°50′20″N 1°47′21″W	1300744	Saltaire Mills – the entrance block More images
Saltaire School including wall, gate piers and sculpted lions to front area, and gate to south side	Saltaire	Gate	1869	22 November 1966	SE1388737896; 53°50′14″N 1°47′26″W	1300666	Saltaire School including wall, gate piers and sculpted lions to front area, and gate to south side More images
St George's Hall	Bradford	Meeting hall	1851–53	14 June 1963	SE1650332941; 53°47′33″N 1°45′03″W	1338589	St George's Hall More images
Stable Court and Home Farmhouse at Tong Hall	Tong	Farmhouse	Early to mid-18th century	9 August 1983	SE2174830706; 53°46′20″N 1°40′17″W	1133658	Upload Photo
The National Westminster Bank	Bradford	Bank (financial)	1868	9 August 1983	SE1637533155; 53°47′40″N 1°45′10″W	1133063	The National Westminster Bank More images
The Old Manor House	Wyke	Manor house	17th/18th century	4 September 1952	SE1523525988; 53°43′48″N 1°46′14″W	1133000	The Old Manor House More images
Thornton Hall	Thornton	House	Late 17th century	4 September 1952	SE1056332633; 53°47′24″N 1°50′28″W	1220076	Upload Photo
Victoria Hall Including wall, gate piers and sculpted lions to front area, and railings to rear	Saltaire	Institute	1867–71	22 November 1966	SE1397137883; 53°50′13″N 1°47′21″W	1314205	Victoria Hall Including wall, gate piers and sculpted lions to front area, and railings to rear More images
West Scholes House and Cottage	Yews Green	House	Late 17th century	4 September 1952	SE0990531428; 53°46′45″N 1°51′04″W	1314162	West Scholes House and Cottage More images
Woodside Cottage and Woodside Farmhouse	Wyke	Farmhouse	Late 17th century	4 September 1952	SE1468627350; 53°44′32″N 1°46′44″W	1133094	Upload Photo
439–443 Shetcliffe Lane	Bierley	House	1625	4 September 1952	SE1780629496; 53°45′41″N 1°43′53″W	1219429	439–443 Shetcliffe Lane
7–10 Chapel Fold	Wibsey	House	c.1635	4 September 1952	SE1472430307; 53°46′08″N 1°46′41″W	1133238	Upload Photo
670 and 670a Great Horton Road	Great Horton, Bradford	House	1746	4 September 1952	SE1417431558; 53°46′49″N 1°47′11″W	1133138	670 and 670a Great Horton Road
Keighley War Memorial	Keighley, Bradford	War memorial	1924	4 December 1986	SE0607741300; 53°52′04″N 1°54′33″W	1313949	Keighley War Memorial More images

== See also ==
- Grade I listed buildings in City of Bradford
- Grade II* listed buildings in West Yorkshire
  - Grade II* listed buildings in Leeds
  - Grade II* listed buildings in Wakefield
  - Grade II* listed buildings in Kirklees
  - Grade II* listed buildings in Calderdale
