= Dowley Gap Aqueduct =

Aqueduct in West Yorkshire, England

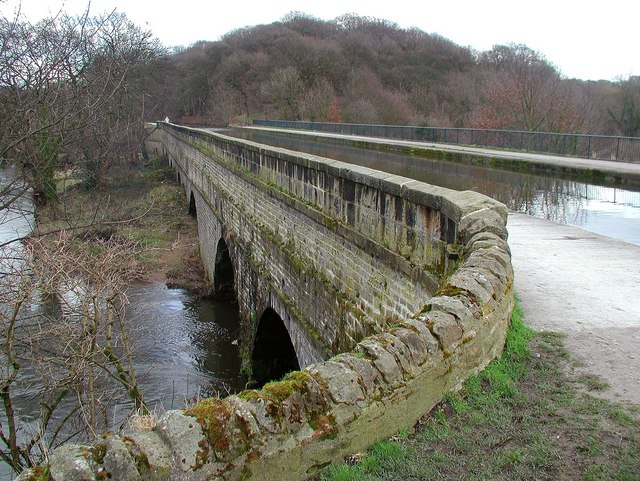
- Dowley Gap Aqueduct
- Coordinates: 53.84033°N 1.81536°W
- OS grid reference: SE122382
- Carries: Leeds and Liverpool Canal
- Crosses: River Aire
- Locale: Shipley, West Yorkshire
- Other name: Seven Arches Aqueduct

Characteristics
- Towpaths: Both
- No. of spans: 7

History
- Construction end: c. 1773
- Opened: 1774

Location
- Interactive map of Dowley Gap Aqueduct

Dowley Gap Aqueduct (also known as Seven Arches Aqueduct), is a bridge which carries the Leeds and Liverpool Canal over the River Aire at Dowley Gap between Bingley and Shipley in West Yorkshire, England. The aqueduct was opened c. 1773 and is 14 miles 2 furlongs (23 km) west of Leeds, and 113 miles (182 km) east of Liverpool. The aqueduct is now a grade II listed structure.

== Construction ==
The aqueduct has seven arches, hence its second name of Seven Arches Aqueduct, but the River Aire only normally flows through the most westerly two arches. The other arches have pitched stone steps sunk at ground level to stop the river scouring them when it is in flood. The aqueduct was approved by an act of 1768, and was built around 1773 by John Longbottom to a plan by James Brindley, and the contractor on site was James Rhodes, who was local to Shipley. Whilst the bridge is thought to have been completed in 1773, the section of canal it is on did not open until 1774. At the time of completion of the canal, the aqueduct was one of the most expensive engineering builds on the whole canal project. The last arch on the eastern side used to bridge the mill race for New Hirst Mill; the mill had a weir upstream of the aqueduct that would channel water onto the eastern/southern bank to the mill and then return it to the river after it had passed under the aqueduct. Originally, the canal had been meant to take a more southerly course through Dowley Gap; Thomas Jeffrey's map of 1772 shows the route of the intended canal crossing the River Aire where the railway currently does.

The aqueduct carries the canal at a height of 30 feet (9.1 m) above the River Aire with the canal crossing from the south bank of the Aire to the north bank (if travelling upstream), whilst the river curves underneath the canal in an S-bend. The aqueduct is built with seven segmental arches which stretches to about 160 feet (50 m), and is similar to the aqueduct at Gargrave over the Eshton Beck, apart from the Gargrave aqueduct is only five arches.

The aqueduct is Grade II listed, and is contained within the Leeds Liverpool Canal Conservation area, being some 113 miles (182 km) west of Liverpool, and 14 miles 2 furlongs (23 km) east of Leeds. Only one arch of the viaduct at the western end is in the parish of Bingley, whereas the rest of the viaduct is in the parish of Shipley. The aqueduct is 1-mile (1.6 km) west of Saltaire, and 1.75 miles (2.82 km) east of Bingley. The arches are known to be a roosting spot for bats. In 2013, the section of water along the aqueduct was drained to allow for maintenance to be carried out. Before this was done, the section of canal was cleared of living creatures (mostly fish), but it also meant the rehoming of several white-clawed crayfish. The aqueduct was subject to an £18,000 repair in 1995 which used traditional stone-working methods on the then 200-year-old structure, and the aqueduct was also resealed during 2005 in a £600,000 project.

== See also ==
- Bingley Five Rise Locks
- Bingley Three Rise Locks
