= Duncan McCargo =

British academic (born 1963)

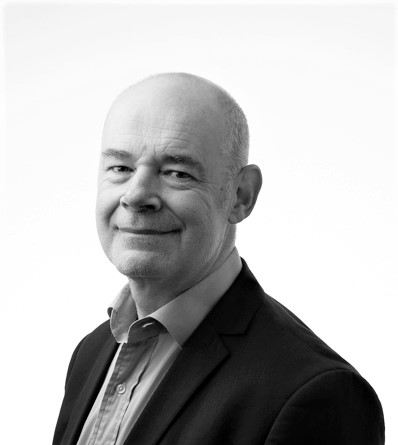
- Born: 1963 (age 62–63)

Education
- Education: Royal Holloway (BA); SOAS, University of London (MA, PhD)

Philosophical work
- Institutions: Queen's University Belfast; University of Leeds; National University of Singapore; Institute for Advanced Study, Princeton; Columbia University; University of Copenhagen; Nanyang Technological University
- Main interests: Nature of power, Comparative politics of Southeast Asia, Politics of Thailand
- Notable ideas: Network monarchy, Generation Z, Thaksinization, urbanized villagers, partisan polyvalence

Duncan McCargo is President's Chair in Global Affairs at Nanyang Technological University in Singapore, where is also a professor of English (by courtesy). McCargo retains an affiliation with the School of Politics and International Studies at the University of Leeds, where he taught for many years. Between 2015 and 2019, McCargo held a shared appointment as a professor of political science at Columbia University. Prior to joining NTU, he served for four years as director of the Nordic Institute of Asian Studies at the University of Copenhagen.

McCargo was the first head of the School of Politics and International Studies, University of Leeds (one of Britain's largest political science departments), a post he held twice. He was appointed a Fellow of the Academy of Social Sciences in 2011, nominated by the Political Studies Association.

He attended Sandbach School and later gained three degrees from the University of London: a First in English (Royal Holloway 1986); then an MA in Area Studies (Southeast Asia) (1990) and a PhD in Politics (1993) from SOAS. He was an undergraduate exchange student at the University of Massachusetts Amherst. McCargo has also taught at Queen's University, Belfast, and at Kobe Gakuin University, Japan. In 2006–2007, he was a visiting senior research fellow at the Asia Research Institute, National University of Singapore. During the 2015–16 academic year, he was a Visitor at the School of Social Science, Institute for Advanced Study, Princeton. He has been listed as one of the world's top 2 per cent of scientists by Stanford Elsevier since 2022, and is currently ranked 123 globally among scholars of international relations.

McCargo is best known for his writing on contemporary Thailand and Asia-related topics. His work deals mainly with the nature of power: how entrenched elites seek to retain it, and how challengers seek to undermine their legitimacy.

== Writings on Thailand ==
McCargo's PhD thesis, The political leadership of Major-General Chamlong Srimuang was published in a revised form as a 1997 book. Since then McCargo has published several other books on Thailand. His earlier Thai books include: Politics and the Press in Thailand (2000), a fieldwork-based study for which he spent a year embedded in the editorial rooms of several leading Thai language newspapers; Reforming Thai Politics (2002) an edited volume which has become the standard work on the political reform process of the 1990s, containing chapters by a range of leading Thai and foreign scholars and activists; and The Thaksinization of Thailand, a widely cited analysis of the politics surrounding controversial former prime minister Thaksin Shinawatra, co-authored with the revisionist political economist Ukrist Pathamanand.

Since 2024, McCargo has been working on a new book project provisionally entitled 'Generation Thailand', examining recent developments in Thailand's politics through the lens of generational contestation. He has conducted hundred of interviews around the country for this project, virtually all of them in Thai.

Apart from his twelve books, McCargo has published a number of articles in journals including Critical Asian Studies, Journal of Asian Studies, Journal of Democracy and New Left Review. His writings regarding the "network monarchy", a term he coined to describe King Bhumibol Adulyadej and his proxies, particularly former Prime Minister Prem Tinsulanond, have been influential among Thai academics. His was the only journal article selected by Foreign Affairs for their seven-item list of essential reading on Thai politics.

Other McCargo articles deal critically with issues such as constitutionalism, the politics surrounding Buddhism, and the role of the military. He was critical of the 2006 and 2014 military coups in Thailand. McCargo's work forms by now a basis of Thai studies, as evidenced by his many publications, awards and appointments mentioned here. At the same time, all of McCargo's work on Thailand and Southeast Asia forms part of his larger intellectual project on the nature of power and justice, which has a broad comparative reach.

== Work on the southern Thai conflict ==
From 2005 to 2010, McCargo worked primarily on the violent conflict affecting Thailand's southern border provinces, spending a year driving around the region and interviewing more than 270 informants. His southern Thai project produced three books: the edited collection Rethinking Thailand’s Southern Violence (2007), which is based on a 2006 special issue of the journal Critical Asian Studies; the research monograph Tearing Apart the Land: Islam and Legitimacy in Southern Thailand (2008); and a second monograph, Mapping National Anxieties: Thailand's Southern Conflict in 2012. In the same year, a Thai translation of Tearing Apart the Land was published by Kobfai.

Tearing Apart the Land has been widely reviewed; Time magazine wrote, "No armchairs for this author: he researched the book by crisscrossing southern Thailand in a temperamental 1989 Mercedes, hastening back to the town of Pattani by nightfall to avoid militant booby traps. McCargo is the real McCoy."

Pacific Affairs wrote of Tearing Apart the Land: "The nuances and complexities of this argument can be obtained only by a thorough reading of the book. It is by far the best analysis to date of the complexities of life in the insurgent area." (Volume 82, No. 4 – Winter 2009/2010, pp. 740–41). In a full-length review essay in London Review of Books, Joshua Kurlantzick declared, "Thailand, once known as one of the most stable democracies in Asia, is in political and economic crisis....Southern Thailand now resembles a war zone....McCargo gives a thorough explanation of why unrest began in southern Thailand, and why it has spread..." (25 March 2010). Reviewing the book in the Journal of Asian Studies (May 1010) Robert W. Hefner wrote, "McCargo has sifted through the details of this tragic conflict with extraordinary diligence and insight. The result is a small masterpiece of investigative rigor and balance."

McCargo's core argument is that the southern conflict is a political problem. Militants tap into local resentment concerning Bangkok's refusal to grant the region any real say in the management of its affairs. Without some form of political compromise, the conflict may prove intractable, but a solution remains perfectly possible.

Tearing Apart the Land won the Asia Society's inaugural Bernard Schwartz Book Prize for 2009, worth US$20,000. Jury co-chair Professor Carol Gluck described it as a "vivid on-the-ground account of the Thai insurgency showing how national politics, rather than minority religion, drives the violence that is too often ascribed either to ethnicity or Islam. This is a lesson that applies not only to Southeast Asia but to many parts of the world."

== Other writings ==
Not all of McCargo's work has been on Thailand. He has also conducted research in Cambodia, Hong Kong, Indonesia, Japan and the Philippines. His 2003 book Media and Politics in Pacific Asia, a companion volume to his Thai press book, develops a comparative argument, arguing against simply "modelling" the political role of the media, in favour of an eclectic approach emphasising the different forms of agency deployed by media actors, which he terms "partisan polyvalence". His media work has won him an audience in the field of communications studies, whose standard assumptions he regularly challenges. In 2012 he published a chapter in Comparing Media Systems: Beyond the Western World, a book edited by Dan Hallin and Paolo Mancini. The chapter contains his critical responses to their earlier comparative work on developing models for the relationship between media and politics.

He has also edited a book on Vietnam (2004). His book Contemporary Japan (fourth edition 2014) is widely assigned by Japanese studies departments as an introductory student text, and has been translated into Malaysian, Chinese and Korean.

Religion has been a central theme of McCargo's work, dating back to his doctoral research on Chamlong's links with the Santi Asoke Buddhist movement. His writings on Thai Buddhism, which he claims is an obstacle to, rather than an asset for processes of democratization in the country, have generated controversy, and have been extensively challenged in two books by the leading scholar-monk Prayudh Payutto. His work on the southern Thai conflict dealt extensively with the role of Islam in Thailand's Malay-majority region.

== Writings on justice and politics ==
Between 2011 and 2014, McCargo held a Leverhulme Trust major research fellowship to examine issues relating to justice and politics in Thailand, from which he has published a number of articles. McCargo spent 2012 conducting fieldwork in Thailand, including participant-observation in courts and police stations; his primary focus was on a number of politically related court cases brought since 2006. This project was written up in Fighting for Virtue: Justice and Politics in Thailand (Cornell 2019). Fighting for Virtue was launched simultaneously on 23 April 2020 in Copenhagen and New York. McCargo has also written critical examinations of transitional justice initiatives, both in Southeast Asia and more broadly. His theoretical approach draws on critiques of legalism and constitutionalism as applied - or mis-applied - to the solution of deep-rooted political problems or conflicts.

== Urbanized villagers ==
In 2011, McCargo published an influential article with his former PhD student Naruemon Thabchumpon in which they coined the term "urbanized villagers", to describe the socio-economic basis of the pro-Thaksin redshirt movement. They argue that the bedrock of the redshirts comprises "poor farmers" who are really neither poor nor farmers: though legally resident in provinces of the North and Northeast, they derive most their income from selling their labor and running small businesses, often in the greater Bangkok area. Former prime minister Thaksin succeeded in capturing the loyalty of this group by persuading them that he was working on behalf of their economic and political interests. The phenomenon found in Thailand, whereby a traditional elite allied with a metropolitan middle class finds itself threatened and outnumbered by the rise of urbanized villagers, can be seen in many other countries. In another co-authored article, McCargo has compared the social structure of Thailand with that of Turkey.

== Future Forward ==
In 2020, McCargo published Future Forward: The Rise and Fall of a Thai Political Party (with Anyarat Chattharakul). Written during a 12-week COVID-19 pandemic lockdown between March and June 2020, the book makes use of digital ethnography methods, including virtual interviews and focus groups, as well as extensive exploration of online sources, especially YouTube. It examines the phenomenon of Thailand's short-lived Future Forward Party through three main chapters on leaders, voters and the party itself. Future Forward is written in a highly accessible style using personal narratives and anecdotes, but is framed by the authors' deep academic understanding of the country's changing electoral politics. It highlights the salience of Generation Z, digital natives under 25 who overwhelmingly supported the fledgling party. At the book's launch event at the Foreign Correspondents' Club of Thailand on 16 November 2020, distinguished Thailand scholar Chris Baker called Future Forward a 'super book' and an 'instant classic'.

== Other activities ==
As a leading expert on contemporary Thailand, McCargo regularly appears as a media commentator, pundit, and writer of op-ed pieces. He appears regularly in the broadcast media, especially on BBC radio and television, and his op-ed and commentary pieces have appeared in Time magazine, as well as in the Guardian Weekly, The Telegraph, The Economist, The Guardian, and The Independent, The Financial Times, The New York Times, and a dozen other newspapers around the world. He has given lengthy interviews to The Chronicle of Higher Education and the New Mandala website. His photographs have appeared in Asia Times, The New York Times and Nikkei Asian Review, as well as in various academic publications. Thirty students successfully earned PhDs under his supervision at Leeds.

McCargo is cited by his undergraduate alma mater, Royal Holloway, as one of their notable alumni in the field of education.

In 2010 he was awarded an honorary doctorate in Tai Studies by Mahasarakham University in Thailand. McCargo is one of only five recipients of this degree. Other awardees have been historians Charnvit Kasetsiri and Thongchai Winichakul, anthropologist Charles Keyes, and archaeologist Srisak Vallibhotama.

On 12 April 2012, McCargo made his stage debut at the Lincoln Center for the Performing Arts in New York City. He co-starred in Titanic Tales: Stories of Courage and Cowardice, a specially commissioned production commemorating the centenary of the sinking of the RMS Titanic.

Duncan McCargo co-created the Nordic Asia podcast series in 2020. The series is now a channel on the New Books Network, the brainchild of Marshall Poe. McCargo is also a host on the Literature and Southeast Asian Studies channels of the New Books Network, as well as his own channel, Talking Thai Politics.

McCargo is one of the patrons of the Brontë Birthplace in Thornton, Bradford, and chairs the Brontë Birthplace Charity.

== Publications ==
=== Authored books ===
- Duncan McCargo, Fighting for Virtue: Justice and Politics in Thailand, Ithaca NY and London: Cornell University Press, 2019.
- Duncan McCargo, Mapping National Anxieties: Thailand's Southern Conflict, Copenhagen: NIAS Press, 2012.
- Duncan McCargo, Tearing Apart the Land: Islam and Legitimacy in Southern Thailand, Ithaca NY and London: Cornell University Press, 2008 (Southeast Asian edition by NUS Press, Singapore, 2009).
- Duncan McCargo, Media and Politics in Pacific Asia, 185 pp, London and New York: Routledge, 2003.
- Duncan McCargo, Politics and the Press in Thailand: media machinations, 205 pp., London and New York: Routledge, 2000 (regional paperback edition, 300pp, Bangkok: Garuda Press 2002).
- Duncan McCargo, Chamlong Srimuang and the New Thai Politics, 334 pp., London and New York: Hurst and St. Martin's Press, 1997.

=== Co-authored books ===
- Sara Park and Duncan McCargo, Contemporary Japan, (fourth edition) London: Bloomsbury, 2025. (Previous editions 2000, 2004, 2013).
- Duncan McCargo and Anyarat Chattharakul, 240 pp, Future Forward: The Rise and Fall of a Thai Political Party, Copenhagen: NIAS Press, 2020
- Duncan McCargo and Ukrist Pathmanand, 277 pp, The Thaksinization of Thailand, Copenhagen: NIAS Press, 2005 (also published in Burmese translation).

=== Edited books ===
- Duncan McCargo, Rethinking Thailand’s Southern Violence, 225pp, Singapore: NUS Press, 2007.
- Duncan McCargo, Rethinking Vietnam, 240pp, London and New York: Routledge, 2004.
- Duncan McCargo, Reforming Thai Politics, 291pp, Copenhagen: NIAS Press, 2002.

=== Selected journal articles ===
- Duncan McCargo, "Transitional Justice and Its Discontents", Journal of Democracy, 26, 2, April 2015, pp. 5–20.
- Naruemon Thabchumpon and Duncan McCargo, "Urbanized Villagers in the 2010 Thai Redshirt Protests: Not Just Poor Farmers?" Asian Survey, 51, 6, 2011, pp. 993–1018.
- Duncan McCargo, "Politics by Other Means? The Virtual Trials of the Khmer Rouge Tribunal", International Affairs, 87, 3, 2011, pp. 613–627.
- Duncan McCargo, "Informal Citizens: Graduated Citizenship in Southern Thailand", Ethnic and Racial Studies, 34, 5, 2011, pp. 833–849.
- Duncan McCargo, "Autonomy for Southern Thailand: Thinking the Unthinkable?" Pacific Affairs, 18, 2, June 2010, 261–281.
- Duncan McCargo, "Network monarchy and legitimacy crises in Thailand", The Pacific Review, 18, 4, pp. 499–519, 2005. doi:10.1080/09512740500338937
- Duncan McCargo, "Cambodia: getting away with authoritarianism", Journal of Democracy, 16, 4, pp. 98–112, 2005.
- William A. Callahan and Duncan McCargo, "Vote-buying in Thailand’s Northeast: the July 1995 general election", Asian Survey, 36, 4, pp. 376–93, 1996.
