= Listed buildings in Bingley =

Bingley is a civil parish in the metropolitan borough of the City of Bradford, West Yorkshire, England. It contains 102 listed buildings that are recorded in the National Heritage List for England. Of these, one is listed at Grade I, the highest of the three grades, six are at Grade II*, the middle grade, and the others are at Grade II, the lowest grade. The parish contains the town of Bingley and the surrounding countryside to the north, east and south, including the villages and settlements of Cottingley, Eldwick, Gilstead, and Micklethwaite.

Most of the listed buildings are houses, cottages and associated structures, farmhouses and farm buildings. The Leeds and Liverpool Canal and the River Aire run through the parish and the listed buildings associated with the canal are the Five Rise Locks, the Three Rise Locks, the Two Rise Locks, two aqueducts, and two bridges. The other listed buildings include churches, chapels and associated structures, an ancient cross, the Butter Cross, an old market, a set of stocks, road bridges, a footbridge and a former packhorse bridge, schools, a former library, a railway station and goods depot, a bandstand, former textile mills and a tannery, a former fire station, a former malthouse, two war memorials, and a telephone kiosk.

== Key ==
Grade	Criteria
I	Buildings of exceptional interest, sometimes considered to be internationally important
II*	Particularly important buildings of more than special interest
II	Buildings of national importance and special interest

== Buildings ==
Name and location	Photograph	Date	Notes	Grade
Butter Cross; 53.84796°N 1.83911°W		13th century (possible)	The Butter Cross consists of an ancient cross and cross base, set in a surrounding structure dated about 1754, and moved to its present site in 1984. The surrounding structure is square, and consists of a base of four steps, with four square stone Doric columns at the corners, carrying a pyramidal stone slate, the shaft of the cross projecting through the apex of the roof.	II
All Saints Church; 53.85144°N 1.84132°W		Late 15th century	The height of the tower was raised in 1739, and the church was restored in 1870–71. The church is built in gritstone with stone slate roofs, and consists of a nave with a clerestory, north and south aisles, a south porch, a chancel with a lean-to south aisle, a north vestry, and a west tower. The tower has diagonal buttresses rising to crocketed pinnacles, a west door with a pointed arch, a sundial, clock faces, and an embattled parapet. The east window has five lights.	II*
Ryshworth Hall; 53.86338°N 1.84868°W	—	Early 16th century	A house that originated as a three-bays timber framed hall, it has been encased in stone, altered and extended during the following centuries. There are two storeys, the south front has a hall range of three wide bays, the outer bays are gabled and contain two-storey canted bay windows, and niches in the gables. In the middle bay is a doorway that has a segmental lintel with Greek key decoration, and a sash window above. To the left the west wing has a hipped roof, three bays, rusticated quoins, a moulded band, and a moulded cornice to a raised parapet. In the centre is a doorway with an architrave, and the wing contains sash windows with architraves and aprons. At the rear are mullioned and transomed windows, a tall stair window, and a Venetian window.	II*
Manor House, 8 and 10 Victoria Street; 53.86779°N 1.84353°W	—	Late 16th to early 17th century	A house, later divided, it is in stone, and has a stone slate roof with a coped gable, kneelers and a finial to the left, and two storeys. The doorway on the left has monolithic jambs and a chamfered surround that rises to form a false ogee lintel, and the doorway to the right has a moulded surround, composite jambs, and a Tudor arched lintel with spandrels. The windows in the ground floor are mullioned and transomed with hood moulds, and in the upper floor they are mullioned and have round-arched heads.	II
Templar Cottage, Beckfoot Farmhouse and Beckfoot Cottage; 53.84200°N 1.84183°W	—	1617	A row of houses in stone that have stone slate roofs with coped gables, kneelers and finials, and two storeys. The left house has three bays, and a T-shaped plan with a cross-wing, and the right house has three bays, the first two bays projecting. This house contains a doorway with a moulded surround, composite jambs, a Tudor arched lintel, and a datestone above. The windows are mullioned with some mullions removed, or mullioned and transomed.	II
Cropper Fold Farm Barn; 53.86308°N 1.80499°W	—	Early to mid 17th century	A stone aisled barn that has a stone slate roof with a coped gable with kneelers, and a dated base for a finial. It has a gabled cart entry containing a semicircular archway with a chamfered surround, and above it is an arched window with sunken spandrels. To the left is a doorway with a chamfered surround and composite jambs, and two two-light mullioned windows with arched lights. To the right are two inserted windows, and in the left return is a doorway with a chamfered surround and a quoined lintel.	II
Ravenroyd; 53.85643°N 1.85295°W	—	Early to mid 17th century	A stone house with a string course, rain spouts and corbels supporting the gutter, a stone slate roof, and two storeys. The doorway has a chamfered surround, composite jambs, and a Tudor arched lintel with carved spandrels. The window to the right of the door is mullioned and transomed, and the other windows are mullioned, those in the upper floor with round-arched lights and sunken spandrels.	II
1-5 Eldwick Beck, Eldwick; 53.86128°N 1.81035°W	—	c. 1650	A row of three cottages, later combined into one house, and altered in the 20th century. The house is in stone with quoins, a stone slate roof, and two storeys. The doorways have narrow stone surrounds, and the windows vary; most are mullioned, some have single lights, and others have been altered.	II
58 Old Main Street, Bingley; 53.85108°N 1.84152°W	—	17th century (probable)	A stone house that was later altered and the front rendered, it has a stone slate roof, with the gable end facing the street There are two storeys, a double-depth plan, and one bay. The doorway on the left has monolithic jambs, and the windows are sashes; in the ground floor is a two-light and a one-light window, and the upper floor contains a two-light window.	II
Ice house northeast of Faweather Farmhouse; 53.87274°N 1.78484°W	—	Mid 17th century (possible)	The ice house is cut out of solid bedrock, and is partly sunk underground. It has an entrance in stone, and steps lead down to a doorway with monolithic jambs. Above the doorway is a coped wall and a datestone. Inside, there is a barrel vault, and an angled shaft in the roof.	II
Faweather Grange and barn 53.87260°N 1.78387°W	—	Mid 17th century	The barn was added at right angles to the house later in the 17th century. The buildings are in gritstone with stone slate roofs. The house has a coped gable with kneelers on the right, two storeys and a cellar, three bays, and a rear outshut. On the front is a gabled porch with double tie-stone jambs and quoined angles, and the inner doorway has a chamfered surround. The windows are mullioned, some with hood moulds.	II
Gawthorpe Hall; 53.85735°N 1.83513°W	—	Mid 17th century	A manor house that was altered in the 19th century, it is in gritstone with stone slate roofs. There are two storeys and attics, and both the front and the rear are flush with five coped gables and finials. The doorway has a Tudor arched head, and most of the windows are mullioned, or mullioned and transomed, with hood moulds. At the rear are some later inserted windows, and there is a tall stair window.	II*
Hill Top Farmhouse and archway 53.86953°N 1.83538°W	—	Mid 17th century	The house is in stone, with quoins, and a stone slate roof with coped gables on the right. The doorway to the right has composite jambs and a lintel with a recess. The windows are mullioned and some mullions have been removed. At the rear, external steps lead to a doorway in the upper floor with tie-stone jambs. Attached to the left side at the rear is a semicircular archway with composite jambs, pilasters with Ionic capitals, a moulded impost, ramped coping, and a ball finial.	II
Monks Barn; 53.85340°N 1.83353°W	—	Mid 17th century	The house, which was altered and extended in the 18th century, is in stone, with gutter brackets and stone slate roofs. There are two storeys and a T-shaped plan. The early part has three bays, and contains a Tudor arched doorway with chamfered surrounds, and mullioned windows, some with hood moulds. The later wing contains a doorway with monolithic jambs, and the gabled wing to the left has rusticated quoins, a band, and a moulded cornice forming a pedimented gable. There are three bays of cross windows with mullions, and a doorway with an architrave.	II
Old White Horse Inn; 53.85072°N 1.84089°W		Mid 17th century	A house, later a public house, it is in whitewashed stone and has a stone slate roof with coped gables and finials. There are two storeys, and the plan is of a hall range, and a projecting gabled cross-wing with quoins on the left. In the cross-wing are a five-light mullioned window in each floor and a doorway to the right, all with hood moulds. In the hall range are altered windows in the ground floor and three-light windows above.	II
Stock-a-close Farmhouse; 53.82814°N 1.83834°W	—	17th century	A stone house with quoins, and a stone slate roof with coped gables and kneelers. There are two storeys, a double-depth plan, and an L-shaped plan with a main range of two bays, and a projecting bay with a catslide roof. The windows are mullioned, those in the ground floor with hood moulds. In the right return is a 20th-century porch.	II
Barn, Stock-a-close Farm; 53.82798°N 1.83807°W	—	17th century (probable)	A stone barn with a stone slate roof, three bays and a single aisle. It contains a blocked wide doorway with a triangular-shaped lintel, and there is an inserted doorway in the right gable end.	II
53 and 55 Gilstead Lane, Gilstead; 53.84769°N 1.81891°W	—	Mid to late 17th century	A stone house, later divided into two, it has a stone slate roof with a coped gable and kneelers on the right. There are two storeys and four bays. The two doorways have chamfered surrounds, one with tie-stone jambs, and the other, which was inserted later, has an arched head. The windows are mullioned, with some mullions removed, and to the right is a former taking-in door with a chamfered surround.	II
Birch Close Farmhouse and cottage 53.87131°N 1.79105°W	—	Mid to late 17th century	The house is the older part, the cottage dating from the late 18th century, and both are in stone with stone slate roofs and two storeys. The house has three bays, and on the front is a two-storey porch with quoined angles and a coped gable with kneelers. The outer doorway has a chamfered surround and a flat head, and the inner doorway has chamfered jambs and an altered lintel. The windows are mullioned, with some mullions removed. The cottage to the right has two bays, a doorway with monolithic jambs, there is one single-light sash window, and the other windows are mullioned.	II
Knapley Ing Farmhouse, Cottage and barn 53.87000°N 1.80310°W	—	Mid to late 17th century	A house with a barn to the right, and a cottage added to the left in the 18th century. They are in stone with quoins, stone slate roofs, and two storeys. The house has a coped gable with kneelers to the right, and three bays. On the front is a gabled porch, the doorway has a chamfered surround, tie-stone jambs, and a false ogee lintel. Above the doorway is a circular window, and the other windows are mullioned. The cottage has one bay and mullioned windows. The barn has four bays and an aisle, and a cart entry in a portal. Elsewhere are doorways, a pitching door, and an arched window with sunken spandrels.	II
Manor Farmhouse and barn 53.82842°N 1.82478°W	—	1666	The house was partly rebuilt in about 1782 when the barn was added. The building is in stone with quoins, and a stone slate roof with coped gables and kneelers. The house has two storeys, two bays, and a rear wing. The central doorway has a chamfered surround, composite jambs and a dated lintel, and to the right is a doorway with monolithic jambs. The windows are mullioned, above the main door is a stone carved with the double cross of the Knights Templar, and above this is a datestone.	II
Greenhill Cragg; 53.86239°N 1.83170°W	—	1669	A stone house with quoins, and a stone slate roof with coped gables and kneelers. There are two storeys and three bays. On the front is a gabled porch and a doorway with a dated lintel. Most of the windows are mullioned, and some mullions have been removed. In the right gable apex is a double cross of the Knights Templar.	II
Ash House Farmhouse; 53.86895°N 1.78005°W	—	Late 17th century	A stone farmhouse with quoins and a stone slate roof. There are two storeys and a cellar, and three bays. It has a gabled porch, the windows on the front are mullioned, and at the rear is a small stair window.	II
Cragg Wood Farmhouse; 53.86462°N 1.80836°W	—	Late 17th century	The farmhouse was altered and extended in the 19th century. It is in stone with quoins and a stone slate roof. There are two storeys, two bays, a projecting cross-wing on the left, and a rear outshut. The central doorway has monolithic jambs and a chamfered surround rising to form a false ogee lintel. Above the doorway is an oculus with a raised architrave and initials and a date in the spandrels. The windows have been altered.	II
Garden wall and gate piers, Eldwick Hall; 53.86701°N 1.81013°W	—	Late 17th century	The wall encloses three sides of a square garden, it is in stone, and has chamfered coping, and ball finials on the corners. On the south side are gate piers consisting of square blocks with pilasters, a cornice, and carved finials. On the east and west sides are doorways with monolithic jambs, impost blocks and segmental-arched lintels with false keystones.	II
Greenhill Grange; 53.86321°N 1.83473°W	—	Late 17th century	A house to which a cottage was added in the 18th century, the building is in stone with quoins and a stone slate roof with coped gables and kneelers. There are two storeys and two bays. On the front is a lean-to porch, and a doorway with chamfered jambs and Tudor arched lintel. The ground floor windows are mullioned with some mullions removed, and in the upper floor are modern windows. In the left return is a double cross of the Knights Templar.	II
Manor House, 4 and 6 Victoria Street; 53.86784°N 1.84340°W	—	Late 17th century	A stone house with quoins, and a stone slate roof with a coped gable and kneelers to the right. There are two storeys and two bays. In the left bay is a doorway with tie-stone jambs, and a moulded surround that rises to form a false ogee lintel, and above it is a datestone. In the upper floor is an arched window with sunken spandrels, and to the right of the doorway is a mullioned window in each floor. The right bay contains an inserted garage door and a four-light window above.	II
March Cote Farmhouse; 53.83097°N 1.84357°W	—	Late 17th century	A stone house with quoins, and a stone slate roof with coped gables and kneelers. There are two storeys and two bays. On the front is a doorway with a chamfered surround, double tie-stone jambs, and a deep lintel, now blocked and an arched window inserted. At the rear are two doorways with tie-stone jambs, and the windows are mullioned, with some mullions removed.	II
Tan House Farmhouse; 53.83744°N 1.82953°W	—	Late 17th century	A house in gritstone with quoins and a stone slate roof. There are two storeys, a double-depth plan, and two bays. The windows are mullioned, with some mullions removed, and at the rear is a round-arched stair window with an impost block and a keystone. The doorway in the right return has a chamfered surround and composite jambs.	II
Ireland Bridge; 53.85035°N 1.84149°W		1686	The bridge carries Millgate over the River Aire, and it was widened and repaired in 1775. The bridge is in stone, and consists of six segmental arches, the southern arch spanning a mill race. It has pointed cutwaters with pyramidal caps and projecting piers above, a band, a parapet with chamfered coping, and abutments to the north.	II*
Barn, Croft House Farm; 53.86850°N 1.84340°W	—	1690	The barn, which is attached to the farmhouse, has voussoirs and a stone slate roof. There are three bays and a single aisle. The barn contains a gabled cart entry at the west end, with a chamfered surround and a semicircular arch, and an arched window and a datestone above. To the right is a doorway with a chamfered surround and composite jambs, and in the gable end are round-arched vents and a square pitching hole.	II
Green Hill Manor; 53.86329°N 1.83604°W	—	1692	The house was moved from its original site and refronted in the late 19th or early 20th century. It is in stone, with quoins, and a stone slate roof with coped gables. There are two storeys and three bays. At the rear are 17th-century windows that are mullioned or mullioned and transomed, a doorway with an eared architrave, a dated lintel, a keystone and a cornice, and a doorway with a chamfered surround and tie-stone jambs. The front also has mullioned and transomed windows, and two doorways with shouldered architraves, and the right bay is gabled.	II
Micklethwaite Grange; 53.86874°N 1.84368°W	—	1695	A stone house that has a stone slate roof with coped gables. There are two storeys, a double-depth plan, and an irregular L-shaped plan. The doorway on the east front has jambs treated as rusticated quoins, a moulded surround, and a dated lintel, and above it is an upright oval window. In the right return is a doorway with an eared architrave, a moulded surround, and a raised keystone. At the rear are two gables, and most of the windows are mullioned, with some mullions removed, and one with the lights stepped.	II
Eldwick Hall; 53.86713°N 1.81002°W		1696	The house is in gritstone, with shaped gutter brackets, and a stone slate roof with coped gables, kneelers, and acorn finials. There are two storeys and an attic, a double depth plan, three bays, and a rear outshut. The central doorway has outer rusticated jambs and an inner architrave, and a dated and initialled lintel. Above the doorway is a window with two round-headed lights in an ogee surround. The outer bays contain mullioned and transomed windows, and above the ground floor windows is a string course stepped over the doorway. In the right return is a doorway with composite jambs and a chamfered surround rising to form a false ogee lintel. The upper floor contains a doorway converted into a window, with a dated lintel, and approached by external steps.	II
Footbridge northeast of Harden Grange; 53.84297°N 1.85118°W	—	Late 17th or early 18th century	The bridge carries a footpath over Harden Beck. It is in stone and consists of a single segmental arch. The bridge has voussoirs and a low parapet on the south side.	II
Gazebo; 53.85317°N 1.83277°W	—	Late 17th or early 18th century	The gazebo is in the rear garden of 60 Park Road. It is in stone with rusticated quoins, a chamfered band, and lacks a roof. There are two storeys and a square plan. The doorway has interrupted jambs, above it is a window with a moulded sill, monolithic moulded jambs, and the remains of a moulded cornice.	II
Old Market Hall; 53.84806°N 1.83917°W		Late 17th or early 18th century	The market hall, which was extended in 1753, was moved to its present site in 1984. It is in stone, with a hipped stone slate roof carried on Doric columns. There is a single storey and five open bays. At the south end is a wall containing a segmental-arched cart entry with tie-stone jambs, voussoirs, and a dated keystone.	II
Cottage southeast of Fairlady Farmhouse; 53.86847°N 1.84133°W	—	1702	A stone cottage with quoins and a stone slate roof. It has a single cell, the doorway has a chamfered surround, monolithic jambs, and an initialled and dated arched lintel, and the windows are mullioned with some mullions removed.	II
Beckfoot Bridge; 53.84223°N 1.84184°W		1723	A former packhorse bridge, it crosses Harden Beck. The bridge is in stone, and consists of a single segmental arch, with voussoirs set back from overhanging parapets, and wooden railings.	II
Barn between 78 and 80 Old Main Street, Bingley; 53.85081°N 1.84107°W	—	Early 18th century	A stone barn, later used for other purposes, with a stone slate roof and three bays. It contains cart entries with chamfered surrounds and segmental-arched heads, a doorway and a window.	II
Moorland Grange Farmhouse; 53.86675°N 1.80933°W	—	Early 18th century	The house was raised from one to two storeys in the 20th century. It is in stone with quoins, and a stone slate roof with a coped gable and kneelers on the right. There are two storeys, and in the centre is a gabled porch with a doorway that has a shouldered architrave, a keystone, a pulvinated frieze and a cornice. The windows are mullioned.	II
Low House and barn 53.86944°N 1.81235°W	—	1731	A barn was added later to the left of the house, followed by a cottage to the right in the 19th century. The building is in stone with quoins, a stone slate roof, and two storeys. The house has two bays, a central doorway with tie-stone jambs, and a chamfered surround rising to form a false ogee lintel. Above the doorway is a date plaque, and the windows are mullioned, with some mullions removed. The cottage has two bays, two doorways and modern windows. On the right return are external steps leading to an upper floor doorway with monolithic jambs. The barn has a coped gable with kneelers on the left, a full-height cart entry with composite jambs, and a large window.	II
Cottingley Bridge House; 53.83758°N 1.83057°W	—	Early to mid 18th century	A stone house with quoins, gutter brackets, and a stone slate roof with coped gables and kneelers. There are two storeys and cellars, a symmetrical front of seven bays, the middle three bays recessed, and an L-shaped plan with a rear wing. In the centre is a doorway with a chamfered surround and monolithic jambs, above it is a fixed window, and flanking it at a higher level are sash windows with plain surrounds. The outer bays contain sash windows in architraves. At the rear are two doorways, one with tie-stone jambs and the other with monolithic jambs, sash windows and mullioned windows.	II
Wall, gatepiers, steps and mounting block, Monk Barn; 53.85339°N 1.83378°W	—	Early to mid 18th century	The stone wall in front of the house is coped, and ramps up over a doorway with an architrave and a false keystone. A flight of six steps leads to square gate piers, each with a chamfered plinth and a moulded cornice. Between the steps is a mounting block approached by four steps on each side.	II
Laythorpe Farmhouse and barn 53.86331°N 1.84238°W	—	1737	The barn was added to the right slightly later. The buildings are in stone with quoins, a stone slate roof, and two storeys. The house has a coped gable on the left, three bays, and a double-depth plan. The central doorway has chamfered monolithic jambs, a dated lintel, and a gabled porch. Above it is a single-light window, and the other windows are mullioned, with some mullions removed. The barn has four bays, and contains a segmental-arched cart entry with a chamfered surround and composite jambs.	II
2, 4, 6, 8, 10A, 12 and 12A Old Main Street, Bingley; 53.85219°N 1.84138°W	—	Mid 18th century (probable)	A row of eight stone cottages with a stone slate roof. There are three storeys and six bays, the left bay slightly canted. In the left bay is a segmental arch with voussoirs converted into a window, and in the other bays are doorways with tie-stone jambs. The windows are mullioned, those in the lower two floors with three lights, the middle light higher, and in the top floor they have two or three lights.	II
Gate piers, All Saints Church; 53.85107°N 1.84127°W	—	Mid 18th century	The gate piers at the entrance to the churchyard opposite 72 Old Main Street are in stone. They have a square plan, they are rusticated, and have plinths, cornices and simple caps.	II
Ice house, Great Wood Middle Farm; 53.87341°N 1.78389°W	—	18th century (probable)	The ice house is in stone, and is partly sunk in a hillside. The doorway has monolithic jambs, and the roof is formed by earth and slates wedged at different angles. Inside there is a long barrel vault, and an angled shaft in the roof.	II
Milner Fields Gardens; 53.84735°N 1.81781°W	—	Mid 18th century	A stone house with quoins, gutter brackets, and a stone slate roof with coped gables and kneelers. There are two storeys, a double-depth plan, three bays and a lower one-bay wing to the left. The doorway has tie-stone jambs and a fanlight, and above it is a re-used datestone. The windows are sashes with architraves in the main part, and with plain surrounds in the wing.	II
Stocks; 53.84797°N 1.83912°W		18th century (probable)	The stocks are inside the Buttercross by the Old Market Hall, and were moved to the present site in 1984. They consist of square stone piers on a stone base and contain wooden keepers with four holes for hands and feet.	II
1 and 3 Millgate, Bingley; 53.85055°N 1.84076°W		Mid to late 18th century	Three cottages, later shops, in stone and whitewashed, they have a stone slate roof with a coped gable on the right. There are two storeys, two bays, and an L-shaped plan with a rear single-bay cottage. On the ground floor are two doorways with monolithic jambs, between them is a canted bow window, and to the right is a shop window. In the upper floor are two three-light mullioned windows, and the rear cottage has a doorway with tie-stone jambs.	II
11 and 13 Old Main Street, Bingley; 53.85086°N 1.84076°W		Mid to late 18th century	A pair of mirror-image cottages that were remodelled in the 20th century. They are in stone, with quoins, and a stone slate roof with coped gables and kneelers. There are two storeys and three bays. In the centre are paired doorways with raised interrupted jambs and triangular pediments, and the windows are sashes.	II
74 Old Main Street, Bingley; 53.85096°N 1.84132°W	—	Mid to late 18th century	A stone house on a plinth, with quoins, a moulded band, and a stone slate roof with coped gables and kneelers. There are two storeys and a symmetrical front of three bays. The central doorway has an eared architrave and a fanlight, and the windows are sashes with architraves, moulded sills, and aprons.	II
Barn and cottage at rear of Old White Horse; 53.85058°N 1.84103°W	—	Mid to late 18th century	The barn and cottage are in stone with quoins and a stone slate roof. There is one storey and a basement, and four bays. The building contains doorways with tie-stone jambs, mullioned windows, and a segmental-arched cart entry.	II
Dowley Gap Bridge (Bridge No. 206); 53.84067°N 1.81779°W		Mid to late 18th century	The bridge is an accommodation bridge on the Leeds and Liverpool Canal. It is in stone, and consists of a single horseshoe elliptical arch with chamfered voussoirs.	II
Scourer Bridge (Bridge No. 205); 53.84159°N 1.82159°W		Mid to late 18th century	The bridge carries Primrose Lane over the Leeds and Liverpool Canal. It is in stone, and consists of a single horseshoe elliptical arch with chamfered voussoirs, and a coped parapet.	II
Toils Farmhouse and barn 53.87021°N 1.80937°W	—	c. 1770	A laithe house, it is in stone, with quoins, a stone slate roof with a coped gable to the left, and two storeys. The barn to the left has five bays, and contains a segmental-arched cart entry with composite jambs, and a doorway with monolithic jambs. The house has a doorway with monolithic jambs, and a moulded surround that rises to form a false ogee lintel. Above it is a single-light window with a false-arched lintel, and the other windows are mullioned.	II
Myrtle Grove; 53.84672°N 1.84023°W		1770–72	A large house, later the Town Hall, and since used as offices, it is in stone, with rusticated quoins, a band, an eaves cornice, and a hipped green Westmorland slate roof. There are two storeys and a symmetrical front of nine bays. The central doorway has Tuscan columns, an entablature, and a triangular pediment, and the windows are sashes. The house is flanked by a stable range and a coach house range. These have stone slate roofs, and fronts of five bays, the middle three bays projecting with quoined angles. Each range contains a band, a pedimented gable, and a Venetian window.	II
Aqueduct over Morton Beck; 53.86694°N 1.84905°W		c. 1770–73	The aqueduct carries the Leeds and Liverpool Canal over Morton Beck. It is in stone and consists of a single segmental arch. The aqueduct has a string course, and a parapet on the side of the towpath.	II
Spring Farmhouse; 53.86086°N 1.80809°W	—	1773	A stone house with quoins and a stone slate roof. There are two storeys, a double-depth plan, two bays, and a single-bay extension on the left. The doorway has tie-stone jambs, and a datestone above the lintel. There are four-light mullioned windows in each bay in both floors. The windows at the rear are also mullioned, and there is a round-headed stair window with a keystone.	II
Five Rise Locks; 53.85579°N 1.83794°W		c. 1773	A continuous flight of five locks and six sets of lock gates providing a rise of 59 feet (18 m) over a distance of 320 feet (98 m) on the Leeds and Liverpool Canal. The locks are in stone, with steps on both sides. An overflow channel from each lock joins a wider channel that flows into the canal at a lower level.	I
Three Rise Locks; 53.85142°N 1.83845°W		c. 1773	A continuous flight of three locks and four sets of lock gates, they are in stone, with 15 steps on both sides. The lowest lock has sloping walls on both sides, and the upper flocks have ramped walls. Channels from the upper locks join an overflow channel on the right.	II*
Two Rise Locks; 53.84104°N 1.81972°W		c. 1773	A flight of two locks and three sets of lock gates, they are in stone, with 10 steps on both sides. The upper lock has pedimented ramps, and there is an overflow channel on the north side with stone retaining walls.	II*
Dowley Gap Aqueduct; 53.84034°N 1.81537°W		c. 1773	The aqueduct carries the Leeds and Liverpool Canal over the River Aire. It is in stone and consists of seven segmental arches, irregularly spaced. The aqueduct has a string course, a parapet on the north side, a steel handrail on the south side, and a concrete path on both sides.	II
Cottage northwest of Faweather Grange; 53.87267°N 1.78418°W	—	Late 18th century	A stone cottage with quoins and a stone slate roof. There is one storey and two bays. The doorway has monolithic jambs, on the front are two three-light mullioned windows and at the rear are two tall rectangular windows.	II
Old School House; 53.85188°N 1.84143°W	—	Late 18th century	Originally the grammar school and master's house, it was extended in the 19th century, and later divided for residential use. It is in stone with quoins and a stone slate roof, hipped on the left. There are two storeys, and the original part on the left has five bays, the middle bay larger and projecting under a pedimented gable. The doorway in the second bay is approached by steps, and has a fanlight and a cornice. The extension is slightly angled, and has three bays. The windows in both parts are sashes.	II
54 and 56 Old Main Street, Bingley; 53.85114°N 1.84162°W	—	1777	A pair of mirror-image stone cottages with quoins, and a stone slate roof. There are two storeys, a double-depth plan, and each cottage has a single bay. The paired central doorways have linked surrounds, and above them is a datestone. In the left house, the ground floor window has been altered, and has pilasters, a frieze, and a cornice, and the other windows are mullioned with three lights.	II
Bingley Church of England First School; 53.85003°N 1.83681°W		1814	The school, which was extended in about 1870, is in gritstone, with stone slate roofs. The original part has one storey, the extension has two storeys, and there are 13 bays. In the south gable end is an inscribed and dated plaque and a clock face. In the bay between the two parts is a gabled cross-wing surmounted by a square bellcote with a pyramidal roof.	II
Former Eldwick Crag Chapel; 53.87373°N 1.80611°W	—	1815	The former chapel is in stone with a stone slate roof. It has one storey, a front of three bays, and is one bay deep. On the front is a central doorway and flanking windows, all with round-arched heads, monolithic jambs, impost blocks, and small keystones.	II
2, 3, 4, 5 and 6 Castlefields, Bingley; 53.85834°N 1.84971°W	—	Early 19th century	A house and a row of cottages at right angles, they are in stone with stone slate roofs. The house has a coped gable, three storeys, and a rear two-storey lean-to. The doorway has a fanlight, most of the windows are sashes, those in the top floor with arched heads, and there is a blind lunette. The cottages have two storeys, a double-depth plan, and each has a single bay. The doorways have tie-stone jambs, and the windows are mullioned with three lights.	II
Green Hill Gate; 53.86405°N 1.83830°W	—	Early to mid 19th century	A stone house with rusticated quoins, a moulded eaves cornice, and a stone slate roof. There are two storeys and a symmetrical front of seven bays, the middle three bays projecting. Steps lead up to the central doorway that has moulded jambs and a cornice on consoles, and the windows are sashes with plain surrounds.	II
Green Hill Hall and Cottage; 53.86242°N 1.83554°W	—	Early to mid 19th century	The house, and a cottage attached at right angles, are in stone and have hipped stone slate roofs and two storeys. The house has a plinth, bands, and an eaves cornice. There is a symmetrical front of seven bays, and semicircular steps lead up to a central doorway that has an architrave, an entablature with fluting, and a triangular pediment on consoles. The windows are sashes, and at the rear is a Venetian window with imposts and a keystone. The cottage has three bays, a central doorway with a single window above, and mullioned windows in the outer bays.	II
76 and 78 Old Main Street, Bingley; 53.85086°N 1.84112°W	—	Mid 19th century (probable)	A shop and a house in stone that have a stone slate roof with a coped gable and a finial on the left. There are two storeys and four bays. In the ground floor is a shop front with pilasters, an entablature, and a cornice, and to the right are a two-light mullioned window and a doorway with monolithic jambs. In the upper floor are two two-light windows and two single-light windows.	II
Former Library; 53.84820°N 1.83788°W		Mid 19th century	The library, later used for other purposes, is in stone with polychromic dressings, sill bands, and a slate roof, and is in Gothic Revival style. There are two storeys and an attic, a gabled front of three bays, and a porch to the left. In the ground floor are three arched windows with cusped heads and a continuous hood moulds. The upper floor contains two larger mullioned and transomed windows with pointed heads. Between the floors are two quatrefoil panels with carving and inscriptions, in the gable is a clock face, and on the ridge is a louvre. The porch has a doorway with a moulded surround and colonnettes, a pointed head, and a coped gable containing a circular carved panel, and surmounted by a finial.	II
Mill Cottage; 53.84240°N 1.84423°W	—	Mid 19th century	A stone house with plain gutter brackets and a stone slate roof. There are two storeys, three bays and a rear outshut. Steps lead up to the doorway, and the windows are mullioned.	II
Old Railway Shed Depot; 53.85059°N 1.83932°W		Mid 19th century	The depot was built by the Midland Railway, and is in stone with a Welsh blue slate roof. There are two storeys and 15 bays, and the windows have segmental arches and voussoirs. In the ground floor are three wide doorways, nine windows, and a timber canopy with two gable hoists. In the upper floor are 13 smaller windows, and at the rear are 15 windows.	II
Rievaulx Cottage; 53.84233°N 1.84459°W	—	Mid 19th century	A mill converted into six cottages in about 1985, it is in stone with plain gutter brackets and a stone slate roof. There are two storeys, a range of seven bays, and a projecting gabled three-bay cross-wing on the left. It contains a round-arched doorway with quoins, imposts and voussoirs, the central bay of the cross wing has a former loading door on each floor, and the other windows are 20th-century casements.	II
The Barn, Beckfoot; 53.84261°N 1.84460°W	—	Mid 19th century	The barn, later converted into a house, is in stone with a stone slate roof. There are two storeys and four bays, the left bay recessed. The building contains a central round-arched cart entry with voussoirs, a doorway with a plain surround on the left, and round-arched slit vents. In the left return is a doorway, and above is a square opening with stanchions.	II
Bandstand; 53.84630°N 1.83839°W		Late 19th century (probable)	The bandstand in Myrtle Park has a stone plinth and an octagonal plan. There are slender cast iron columns each with a vase-shaped baluster base and an Ionic capital, and a wrought iron band and spandrels. The roof is in wood overlaid with Westmorland slate, and it is surmounted by a wrought iron finial.	II
Footbridge at Beckfoot; 53.84218°N 1.84419°W		Late 19th century	The bridge carries a footpath over Harden Beck. It is narrow, in stone, and consists of a single segmental arch. The bridge has voussoirs, and the top course of the parapet is rounded.	II
Oakwood Hall; 53.85979°N 1.83227°W		1864	A large house, later a hotel, it was extended in the 20th century. The building is in stone with a roof of Welsh blue slate, and is in Gothic Revival style. There are two storeys and attics, the entrance front is L-shaped, and there are four bays and three coped gables. In the left bay is an oriel window, and the other windows are mullioned and transomed. The second bay projects and contains a Tudor arched doorway and a large stair window above. Inside, there is decoration by William Burges, and stained glass designed by Edward Burne-Jones.	II
Town Hall, Cottingley; 53.82854°N 1.82201°W		1864–65	This was built has a combined chapel and town hall. It is in stone on a plinth, with a sill band, a dentilled cornice, and a hipped Welsh blue slate roof, and is in Italianate style. There are two storeys, a front of three bays, the middle bay projecting, and five bays on the sides. The central doorway has pilasters, an arched fanlight with panelled spandrels, and a cornice on elongated consoles. The flanking windows have cornices on consoles. In the upper floor the central window is round-arched, and the outer windows have stilted archivolts with keystones. Above the central window is a clock face with volutes, a curved cornice and a bellcote, and on the ridge is a ventilator.	II
The Lodge; 53.85745°N 1.84605°W		c. 1867	The lodge to Longwood Hall was designed by Lockwood and Mawson, and is in stone on a plinth, with an impost band, a modillioned cornice, and a Welsh blue slate roof with a coped gable. There is one storey and a T-shaped plan, with a gabled wing on the right with a sash window. The central open porch has Corinthian pilasters, two arches at right angles with keystones on consoles, and a flat roof. In the first bay is a canted bay window with a Venetian window and a hipped roof, and elsewhere, are round-arched windows.	II
Bingley Independent Methodist Church; 53.84675°N 1.83213°W		1868	The church is in stone, with rusticated quoins, a moulded string course, two storeys, and a basement. The front has a pedimented gable with a circular inscribed plaque in the tympanum, and four bays. In the centre are paired doorways with pilasters, an entablature with a dentilled cornice and a blocking course. This is flanked by windows with segmental lintels, and in the upper floor are round-arched windows. On the sides are four bays, with similar windows and square-headed windows in the basement.	II
Main block, Bingley Mill; 53.85178°N 1.83724°W	—	c. 1870	The former mill, later converted for residential use, is in stone with corner pilasters, sill bands, an eaves band, a modillioned cornice to the gutters, and a roof of Westmorland green slate. There are four storeys and an attic, 14 bays on the front and five bays on the sides, and a five-storey tower with a pyramidal roof. The windows in the upper three storeys have segmental-arched lintels. In the right return is a Venetian window with an impost and a keystone in the gable apex.	II
Bowling Green Mill, engine house and chimney 53.85088°N 1.83735°W		1871	The former mill is in stone, it has five storeys and 26 bays, and to the left is a six-storey tower. The tower contains a segmental- arched doorway, in the stages above are two, three and four-light windows, in the fifth floor is a dated plaque, and at the top is a water tank. The engine house is gabled, and has three storeys, bracketed eaves, and a window with a decorated lintel. The chimney further to the left is tall and tapering, and has a cornice near the base, and a moulded cornice on consoles to the cap.	II
Holy Trinity Church of England First School; 53.84583°N 1.83017°W	—	1871	The school, which was extended in 1879, was designed by R. Norman Shaw in Gothic Revival style. It is in stone and has a roof of Welsh blue slate with coped gables. There is one storey, and an L-shaped plan, and in the angle is a gabled porch that has two doorways with pointed arches, a plinth, hood moulds, and angle buttresses. The original part of the school has seven bays, and some of the windows have multi-lights and others have pointed arches. The later part has three bays, and contains mullioned and transomed windows.	II
Park Road Tannery; 53.85044°N 1.83598°W	—	c. 1871	The tannery is in stone, the upper storeys have louvred weatherboarding between cast iron columns, and the hipped roof is of Welsh blue slate. There are five storeys and seven bays on Park Road, and four storeys and four bays on Clyde Street. The Clyde Street front has corner rusticated pilasters, a flat-headed doorway in the first bay with an architrave and a fanlight, and a small arched window to the right. In the second bay is a semicircular-headed doorway with monolithic jambs, a moulded surround, a fanlight, and a cornice on consoles, and the other bays contain windows with segmental lintels on consoles. The first floor has rectangular windows, above which is a moulded cornice on shaped brackets. Attached to the rear is a four-storey water tower.	II
North Lodge and gate piers, Milner Field; 53.84639°N 1.81680°W	—	1871–73	The lodge is in stone with a roof of Welsh blue slate. There are two storeys and an attic, a hall range, a gabled wing to the left, and a single-storey bay projecting at the front. The hall range is surmounted by a broached turret with a conical roof. Flanking the entrance to the drive are stone gate piers with gabled capstones and trefoil-headed insets.	II
White Lodge and White Lodge West; 53.84214°N 1.83299°W	—	1873	Originally the vicarage to Holy Trinity Church, it has been divided into two dwellings, and was designed by R. Norman Shaw. It is in stone with a red tile roof, hipped and half-hipped. There are two storeys and attics, and a single-storey outshut on the right. The doorway has a moulded surround, composite jambs, and an inscribed lintel. Most of the windows are sashes and there is a tall stair window, all with segmental lintels. At the rear and in the left return are canted gabled oriel windows, and there are two eaves dormers.	II
Bingley Baptist Church; 53.85074°N 1.83569°W		1874–76	The church, which is in Early English style, is built in stone with a roof of Welsh blue slate. It consists of a nave embracing a stair tower, a transept, and a northwest steeple. The steeple has a tower with three stages and a slate-hung spire.	II
Wall, railings and gate piers, Bingley Baptist Church; 53.85078°N 1.83590°W	—	c. 1876	The stone walls enclosing the forecourt of the church have chamfered coping, and the gate piers have pinnacles. The gates and railings are in cast iron.	II
Bingley railway station 53.84861°N 1.83732°W		1892	The railway station was designed by Charles Trubshaw for the Midland Railway. The main building is in sandstone with slate roofs, it has a single storey with seven bays, the outer bays being projecting gabled cross-wings, with finials, carvings in the apices, and four-light mullioned windows. In the central range is an arched entrance, and above it is a parapet with three raised heads. The other parts of the station include the platform buildings, a platform walkway, and an entrance from Park Road.	II
Old Fire Station; 53.84888°N 1.83958°W	—	1902	The fire station, later used for other purposes, is in stone and has a Welsh blue slate roof with coped gables. There are two storeys, with the house slightly lower on the left, and a four-storey tower at the rear. The engine room to the right has a glass-roofed canopy on cast iron columns. The middle bay contains a round-arched window in the upper floor that rises above the eaves in a shaped gable with a finial, and on the ridge is a decorative ventilator. On the top of the tower is a shaped parapet and an open wooden structure.	II
Railings, wall, gate piers and gates, Gilstead Methodist Chapel; 53.84767°N 1.82284°W		c. 1904	The low wall is in stone and on three levels, and the stone gate piers are square with ball finials. The railings and gates are in cast and wrought iron, and the railings end in an Art Nouveau feature consisting of a triple depressed elliptical arch.	II
Original Building, Bingley Training College; 53.86019°N 1.83016°W	—	1909–11	The former college, which has been converted into flats, is in stone with a roof of Welsh blue slate. There are three storeys, and a symmetrical U-shaped plan, with a central range and projecting wings with hipped roofs and gablets. The middle three bays of the central range project, and contain an Ionic porch with an open segmental pediment. Above this is a canted window in each upper floor, over which is a triangular pediment and a balustraded parapet. This is surmounted by a three-stage clock tower flanked by piers with urns. Most of the other windows are mullioned with two lights, and each wing has a circular window with a keystone in a segmental pediment.	II
War Memorial, Bingley; 53.84583°N 1.83951°W		c. 1922	The war memorial in Myrtle Park is in stone on an octagonal base. It has an octagonal tapering shaft carved with spears in each face, and at the top is an open carved cross. On the sides of the base are panels inscribed with the names of those lost in the two World Wars.	II
War memorial, Eldwick; 53.86070°N 1.81079°W		1922	The war memorial is by a road junction, and is in local stone in the form of a cenotaph. It consists of a square shaft with carved corners, on a base of shallow steps on a concrete plinth. Surmounting the shaft is a cornice and a cap in the form of an obelisk, with a carved wreath and a cross. On the base is an inscription, and on the front of the shaft are dates, and two bronze plaques with the names of those lost in the two World Wars.	II
Telephone kiosk, Micklethwaite; 53.86992°N 1.84369°W	—	1935	The telephone kiosk is in front of 8 High Fold, and is of the K6 type, designed by Giles Gilbert Scott. Constructed in cast iron with a square plan and a dome, it has unperforated crowns in the top panels.	II
12–20 Victoria Street, Micklethwaite; 53.86763°N 1.84391°W		Undated	A terrace of five cottages, later combined into four, it is in stone with a Welsh blue slate roof. There are two storeys and five bays. The left cottage has a gabled porch, and the others have doorways with tie-stone jambs. There are inserted windows above the doorways, and the other windows are mullioned, most with four lights.	II
Gate piers and walls east of Eldwick Hall; 53.86713°N 1.80985°W		Undated	The gate piers and flanking walls are in stone. The gate piers have chamfered bases, square block entablatures, moulded cornices, and ball finials. The walls have moulded coping, they dip, then ramp up to the gate piers. At the left end is a doorway with monolithic jambs and a chamfered lintel. At the right end the wall returns to the house, and contains a doorway with composite jambs and a chamfered arched lintel, and a three-light mullioned window.	II
Malthouse; 53.86852°N 1.84379°W	—	Undated	The former malthouse is in stone, and has a modern tile roof, two storeys, and a long rectangular plan. Steps lead up to the doorway that has monolithic jambs and a raised lintel. Most of the windows are mullioned, some with round-arched lights, and in the right gable end is a Venetian window.	II
