= Bingley Three Rise Locks =

Flight of canal locks in Yorkshire, England

Coordinates: 53.8514°N 1.8384°W

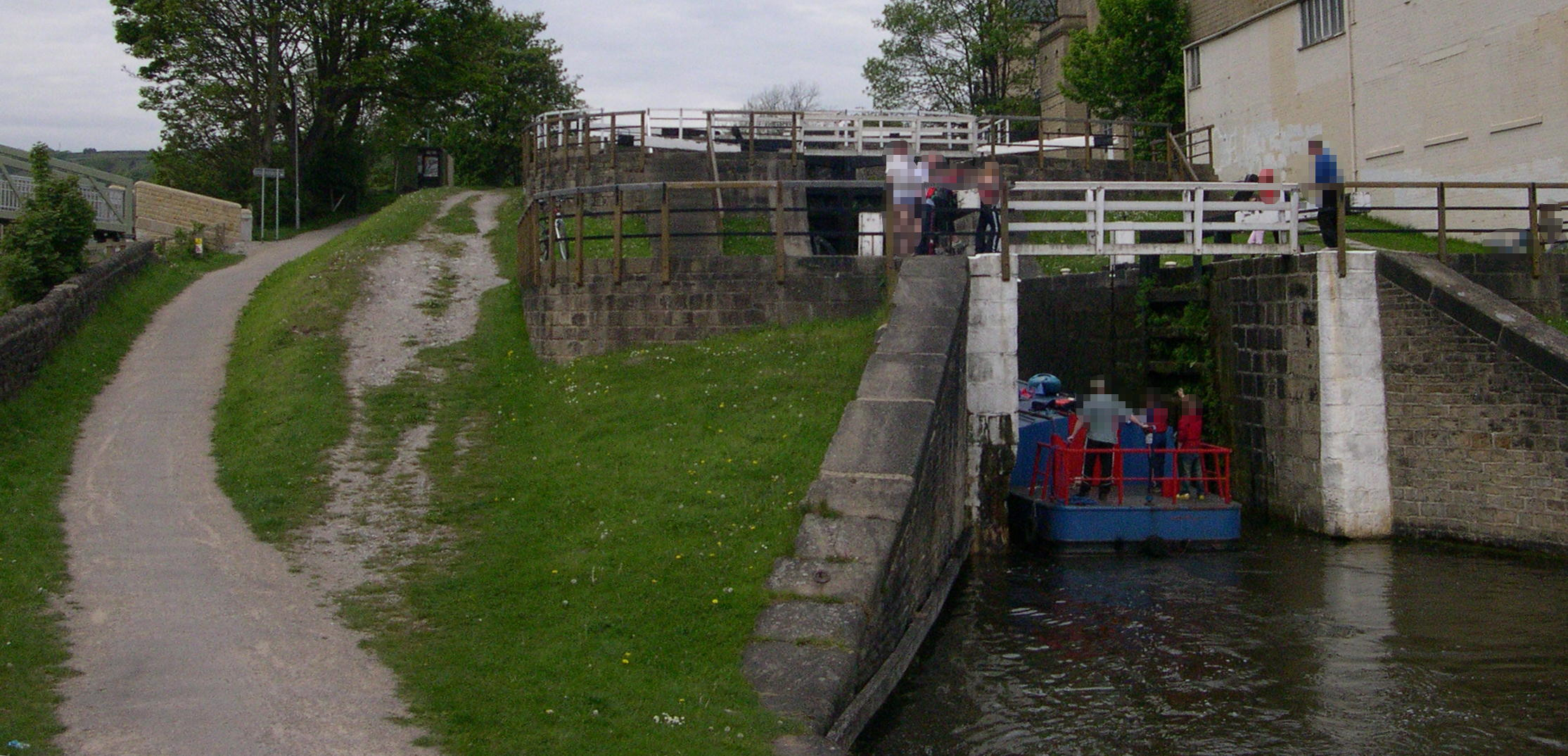
Bingley Three Rise Locks from below

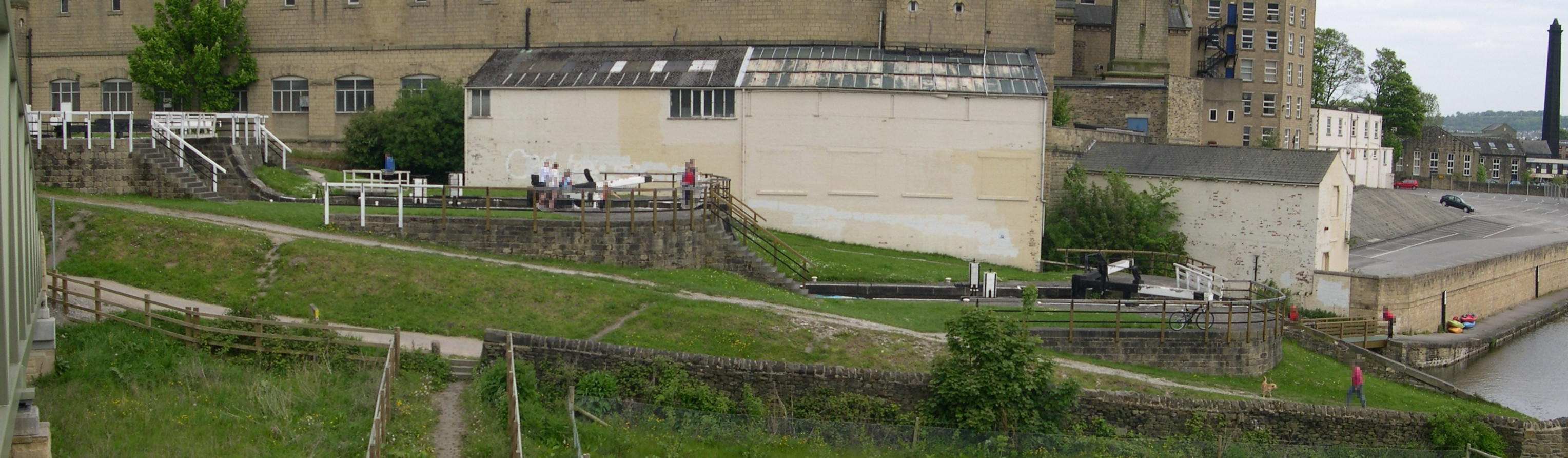
The locks from alongside

Bingley Three Rise Locks is a staircase of three locks on the Leeds and Liverpool Canal at Bingley, West Yorkshire, England. The locks are a Grade II* listed building.

The locks were designed by John Longbotham and opened in 1774. The stone locks are still operational and underwent major refurbishment including the installation of new lock gates in 2015.

== History ==
The Leeds and Liverpool Canal is a canal in Northern England, linking the cities of Leeds and Liverpool. It covers a distance of 127 miles (204 km), it crosses the Pennines, and includes 91 locks on the main line. The canal was planned by James Brindley and authorised by an Act of Parliament in 1768.

The Bingley Three Rise Locks opened in 1774 and was a major feat of engineering at the time along with the larger Five Rise opened at the same time and several hundred metres further up. They were designed by John Longbotham and consist of a staircase flight – the lower gate of one lock forming the upper gate of the next lock.

In 1985 the locks were designated Grade II* listed status. They are built with stone retaining walls with steps to enable access for those opening the lock gates. There are overflow channels in the top two chambers, that run into the by-wash that flows alongside.

In 2007 the lock gates were refurbished with full replacement of the gates taking place in December 2015. Hand-crafted English oak gates made at Stanley Ferry in Wakefield and weighing 4.5 tonnes (5.0 tons) were swung into place on the locks in a £3.5 million restoration programme.

== See also ==
- Grade II* listed buildings in Bradford
- Listed buildings in Bingley
- Bingley Five Rise Locks
