= Grade I listed buildings in City of Bradford =

Bradford City Hall

This is a list of the grade I listed buildings in the City of Bradford. In the United Kingdom, the term listed building refers to a building or other structure officially designated as being of special architectural, historical or cultural significance; Grade I structures are those on account of their special architectural or historic interest. In England, the authority for listing under the Planning (Listed Buildings and Conservation Areas) Act 1990 rests with English Heritage, a non-departmental public body sponsored by the Department for Culture, Media and Sport.

The city of Bradford is a metropolitan borough in West Yorkshire, England, established by the Local Government Act 1972. It covers a number of other outlying towns and villages, which had previously been covered by separate municipal borough, urban and rural district councils. The buildings are listed according to their individual towns, with Bradford having the most listed buildings, with a total of seven. Ilkley has four, with one of those being three stones outside All Saints Parish Church. Keighley has three listed buildings, Addingham has two, and Bingley and Shipley each have one.

== Addingham ==
Name	Completed	Architect	Location	Grid Ref	Refs
Farfield Hall	1722 or 1729		Bolton Road, Addingham		
St Peter's Church	15th century		Church Street, Addingham		

== Bingley ==
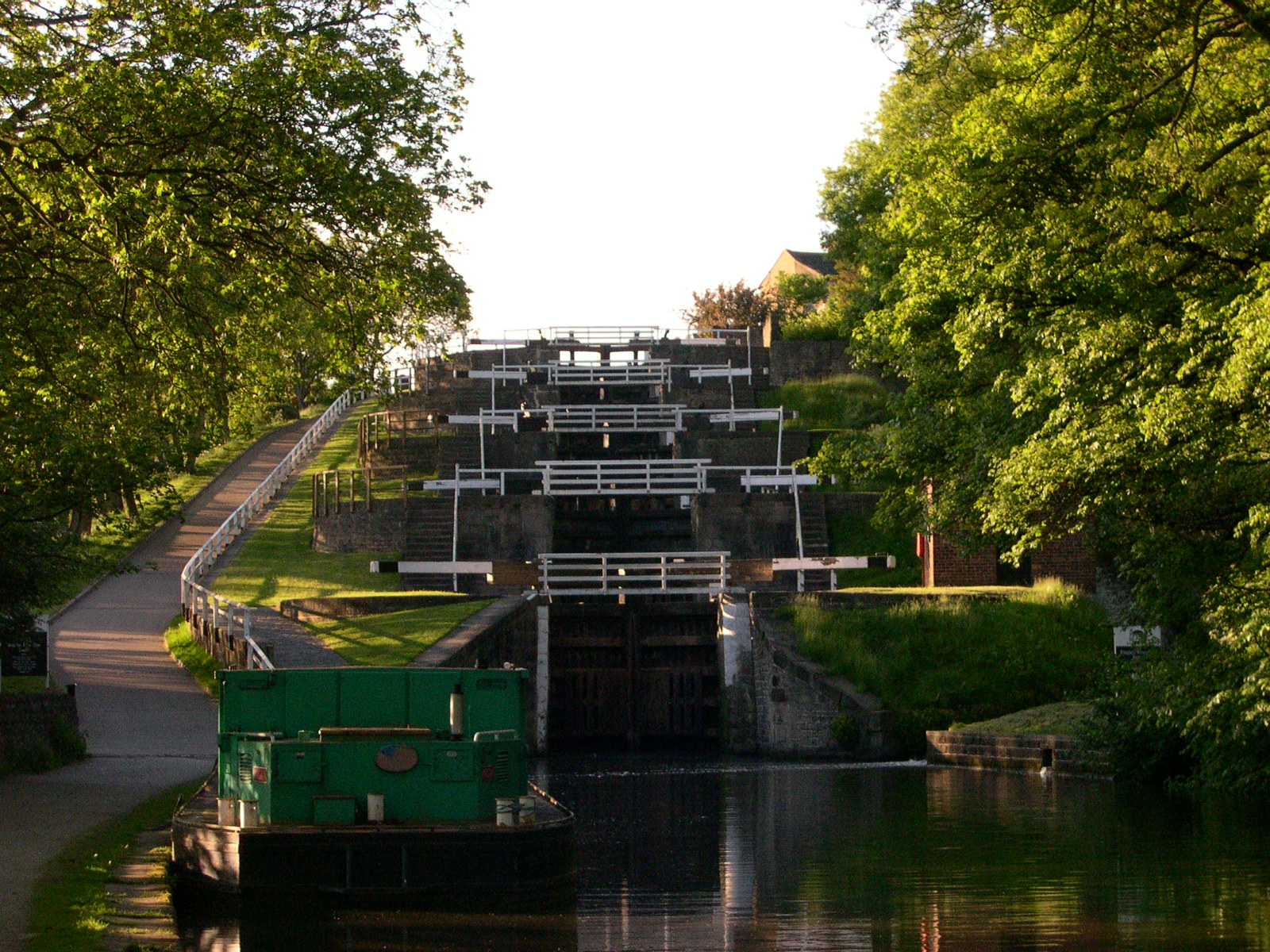
Looking up toward Five Rise Locks

Name	Completed	Architect	Location	Grid Ref	Refs
Five Rise Locks	c. 1773	John Longbottom	Leeds and Liverpool Canal, Bingley	SE107399	

== Bradford ==
The nave of Bradford Cathedral

Name	Completed	Architect	Location	Grid Ref	Refs
Bolling Hall	14th century		Bowling Hall Road, Bowling, Bradford	SE172314	
Bradford Cathedral	8th century		Church Bank, Bradford	SE166333	
Bradford City Hall	1873	F E P Edwards	Town Hall Square, Bradford		
Tong Hall	1702	Sir George Tempest	Tong Lane, Tong, Bradford		
St James's Church	1727	Sir George Tempest	Tong Lane, Tong, Bradford		
Upper Headley Hall			Headley Lane, Thornton Bradford		
Wool Exchange	1867	Lockwood and Mawson	Market Street, Bradford		

== Ilkley ==
Name	Completed	Architect	Location	Grid Ref	Refs
All Saints' Parish Church stone crosses	9th century		Church Street, Ilkley		
Burley House	18th century		Bradford Road, Burley in Wharfedale		
Manor House	16th century		Castle Yard, Ilkley		
Myddleton Lodge	16th century		Langbar Road, Ilkley		
Heathcote, subsidiary buildings and structures, and entrance walls	20th century		King's Road, Ilkley		

== Keighley ==
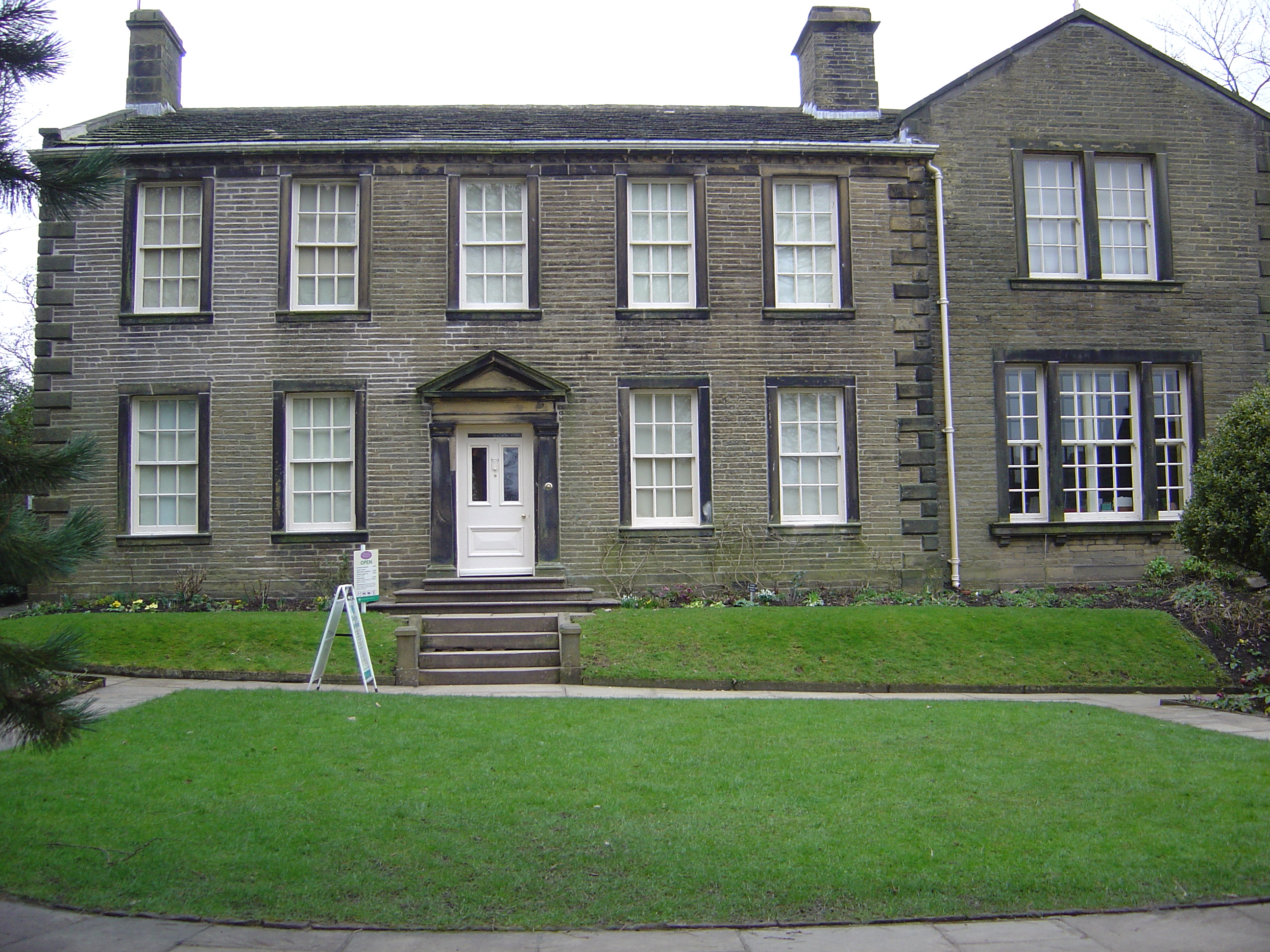
Brontë Parsonage Museum

Name	Completed	Architect	Location	Grid Ref	Refs
Brontë Parsonage Museum	1779		Church Street, Haworth		
East Riddlesden Hall	1640		Bradford Road, Riddlesden		
West Riddlesden Hall	c. 1687		Scott Lane, Riddlesden		

== Shipley ==
The Congregational Church in Saltaire

Name	Completed	Architect	Location	Grid Ref	Refs
Saltaire United Reformed Church	1859	Lockwood and Mawson	Victoria Road, Saltaire	SE138381	

== See also ==
- Conservation in the United Kingdom
