= Ireland Bridge =

Listed bridge in West Yorkshire, England

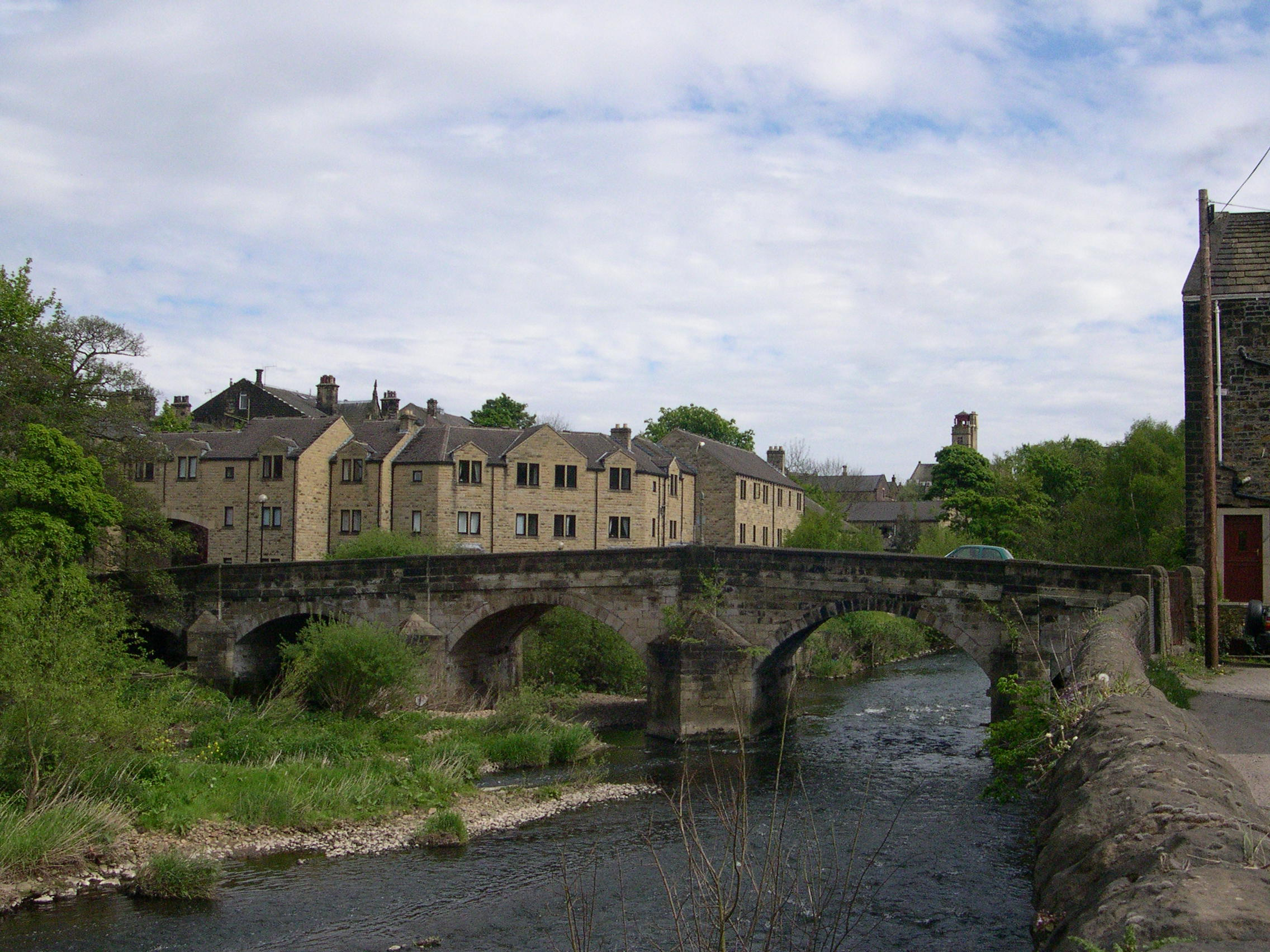
- Coordinates: 53.850293°N 1.84157°W
- Crosses: River Aire
- Locale: Bingley
- Maintained by: Bradford District Council

Characteristics
- Material: Dressed stone
- No. of spans: 7

History
- Opened: 1686

Location
- Interactive map of Ireland Bridge

Bingley's Ireland Bridge is a Grade II* listed structure and a historically significant crossing point over the River Aire in West Yorkshire, England. It now provides the main route between Bingley and the nearby villages of Harden, Wilsden and Cullingworth (the B6429).

== History ==
A bridge has existed at this point over the river since mediaeval times. The current bridge dates from 1686 and replaced an earlier timber structure. During renovations in 2010, engineers found unique stonemason marks carved into sections of the bridge that were previously inaccessible until the scaffolding went up around it. The bridge was widened and a parapet added in 1775. Previous to the bridge being built, visitors to the town would ford the river at a crossing just south of the bridge that would lead them to the bottom of what is now Ferrand Lane. When the water is low enough, the stones of this crossing are said to be visible.

The All Saints Parish Church and the Old White Horse Inn, a Coaching inn were constructed very close to the eastern bank and Bingley's modern town centre spread south from these beginnings. A mill extended on the east bank for which a weir was built across the Aire. The water was then funnelled under the mill to power the works which started out as a corn mill, a forge, and a fat refinery. The mill was demolished in 1984 and the site has now been replaced by housing.

In the 18th century, the middle of the bridge was an area where locals would congregate and 'gossip'. This would also entail talking to travellers who were using the bridge to get from Halifax and beyond to Otley and Ilkley.

The bridge was originally named Bingley Bridge, but an influx of Irish immigrants caused a name change. They came to work in the Bingley mills and they also visited the Brown Cow Inn, which meant going across the bridge. The Brown Cow acquired the nickname of 'The Irish Inn'; this also led to the bridge being similarly named. Harry Speight in his book The Chronicles of Old Bingley suggests the name came about due to the crossing of the Aire being like going over the water to Ireland.

== Strengthening works ==
Despite previous strengthening works, the bridge was deemed unfit for two-way traffic, and traffic lights were installed for a time at either end. These allowed only a single lane across for some time – disrupting local traffic at peak times.

In January 2010, Bradford Council closed the bridge completely, and commenced works to strengthen the bridge. These works resulted in the closure of Harden Road to vehicles over the bridge. The works were originally due to take place in June 2009, but were postponed owing to the presence of rare Daubenton's bats roosting in the spans of the bridge. After a £1.6 million project, Ireland Bridge reopened to two-way traffic in June 2010.

== See also ==
- Grade II* listed buildings in Bradford
- Listed buildings in Bingley
