= Old White Horse Inn =

Pub in Bingley, West Yorkshire, England

Coordinates: 53°51′06″N 1°50′30″W

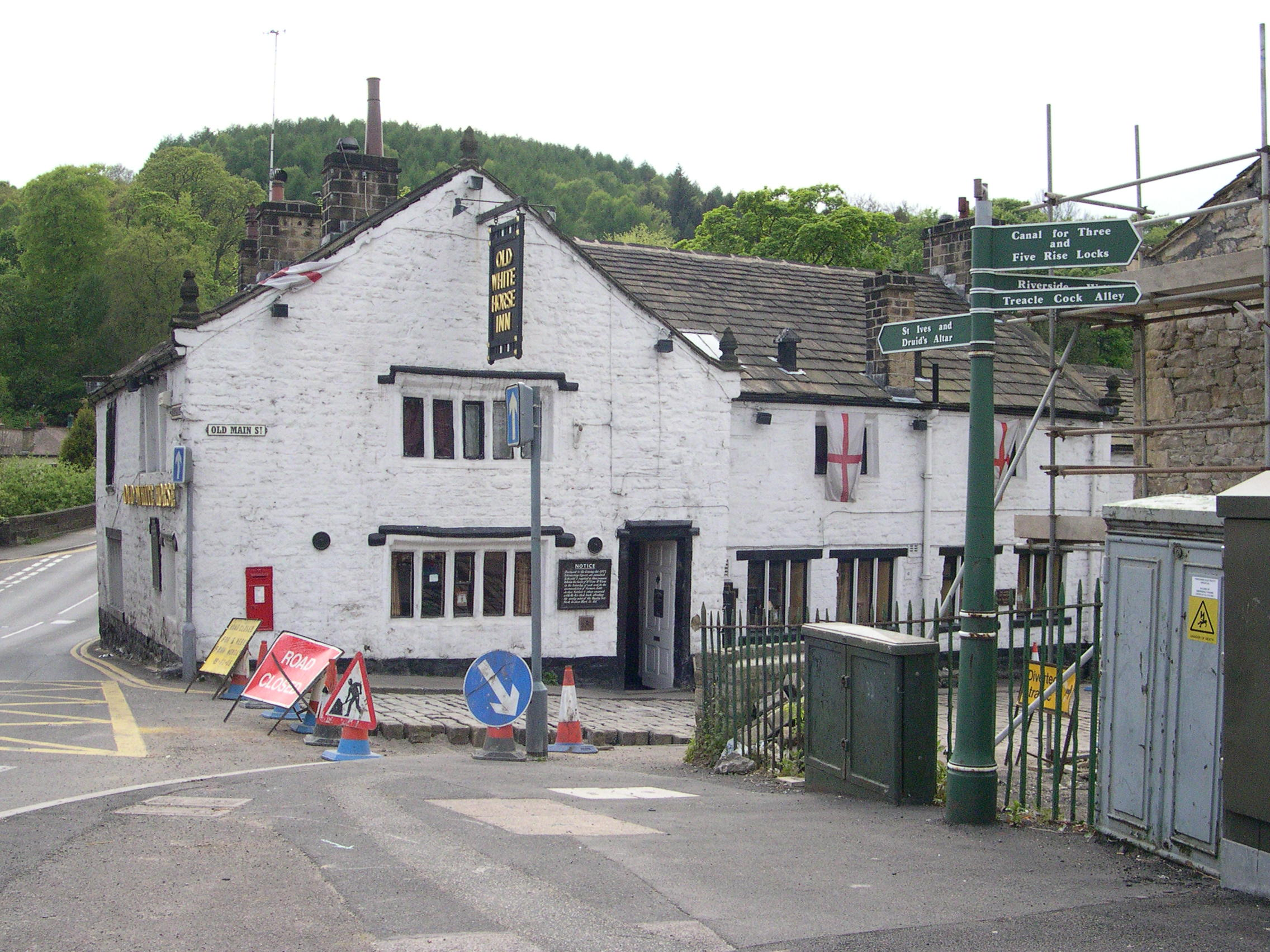
Bingley Old White Horse Inn

The Old White Horse Inn in Bingley, West Yorkshire, England, is one of the oldest buildings still in use in the town. It was originally constructed as a coaching inn in the mid-seventeenth century, strategically positioned with Ireland Bridge on the one side and the Parish church on the other. The building is an English Grade II listed building and has a significant amount of coaching inn infrastructure surviving including a stable, barn and two coach entrances which are located around an inner courtyard. On each side of the gable are stone lanterns that denote the former owners Order of Knights of St John of Jerusalem. There is evidence that a hostelry has been on the site since 1379.

== See also ==
- Listed buildings in Bingley
