= John Longbotham =

John Longbotham (died 1801) was a canal engineer and pupil of John Smeaton who in 1766 suggested a Leeds and Liverpool Canal and did a survey which was approved by James Brindley. He subsequently became the chief engineer and completed the canal between Bingley and Skipton before resigning in 1775.

== Career ==
In 1766, Longbotham, together with John Hustler, a Bradford wool merchant and Quaker, called a public meeting at the Sun Inn, Bradford to discuss a broad canal linking Liverpool to Hull via the Aire and Calder Canal. He prepared a survey which was presented in 1768. To gain wider support the canal was promoted by committees in Bradford and Liverpool, with the Bradford committee controlling finances. The Liverpool committee objected to Longbotham's line down the valleys of the Calder and Ribble to Preston as it avoided a number of industrial Lancashire towns and suggested an alternative route which the Bradford committee found too long and expensive. James Brindley was brought in to arbitrate and ruled in favour of Longbotham's line and an Act of Parliament was passed in 1770.

Although Brindley was appointed as chief engineer he did not take up the appointment and Longbotham was appointed as both chief engineer and clerk of works. By April 1773 the canal was open between Bingley and Skipton. In 1774 it was open between Liverpool and Newburgh and the Bingley Five Rise Locks and the Bradford branch were open.

Meanwhile, he was also involved with surveys on the Bradford canal and the proposed Leeds and Selby Canal and bought coal mines at Upholland, near Wigan. Because of these activities the committee of the Leeds and Liverpool Canal complained that he was not spending enough time on their project and he either resigned his post or was dismissed because the accounts were not in order.

In 1774, he started a packet service between Liverpool and Newburgh. In 1787 he was doing surveys for the proposed Lancaster Canal, with a route that combined navigation and drainage requirements. By 1791 he was brought back to advise the Leeds and Liverpool Canal committee on a new line in response to Robert Whitworth's proposal. In 1792 he did preparatory surveys for the Grand Western Canal crossing Devon and Somerset and worked on the proposed Bristol and Western Canal from the Avon to Taunton.

By 1800 he was in poverty and when he died in 1801, the Leeds and Liverpool Canal paid for his funeral expenses.

A television documentary on Canal Building in Britain stated that Jonathan(John)Longbottom caught pneumonia and died and never saw his project finished.
