= Oakwood Hall =

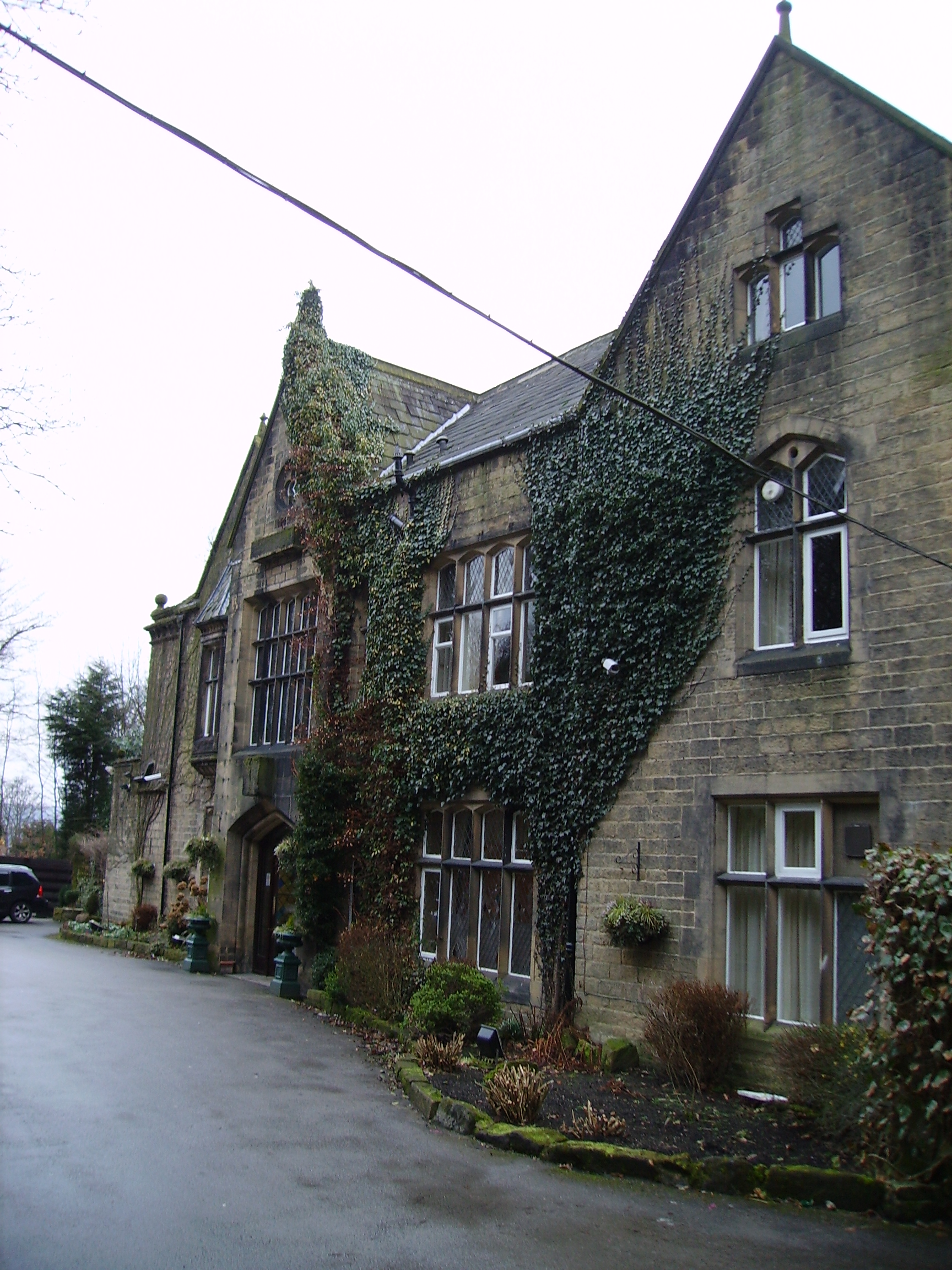
- Oakwood Hall

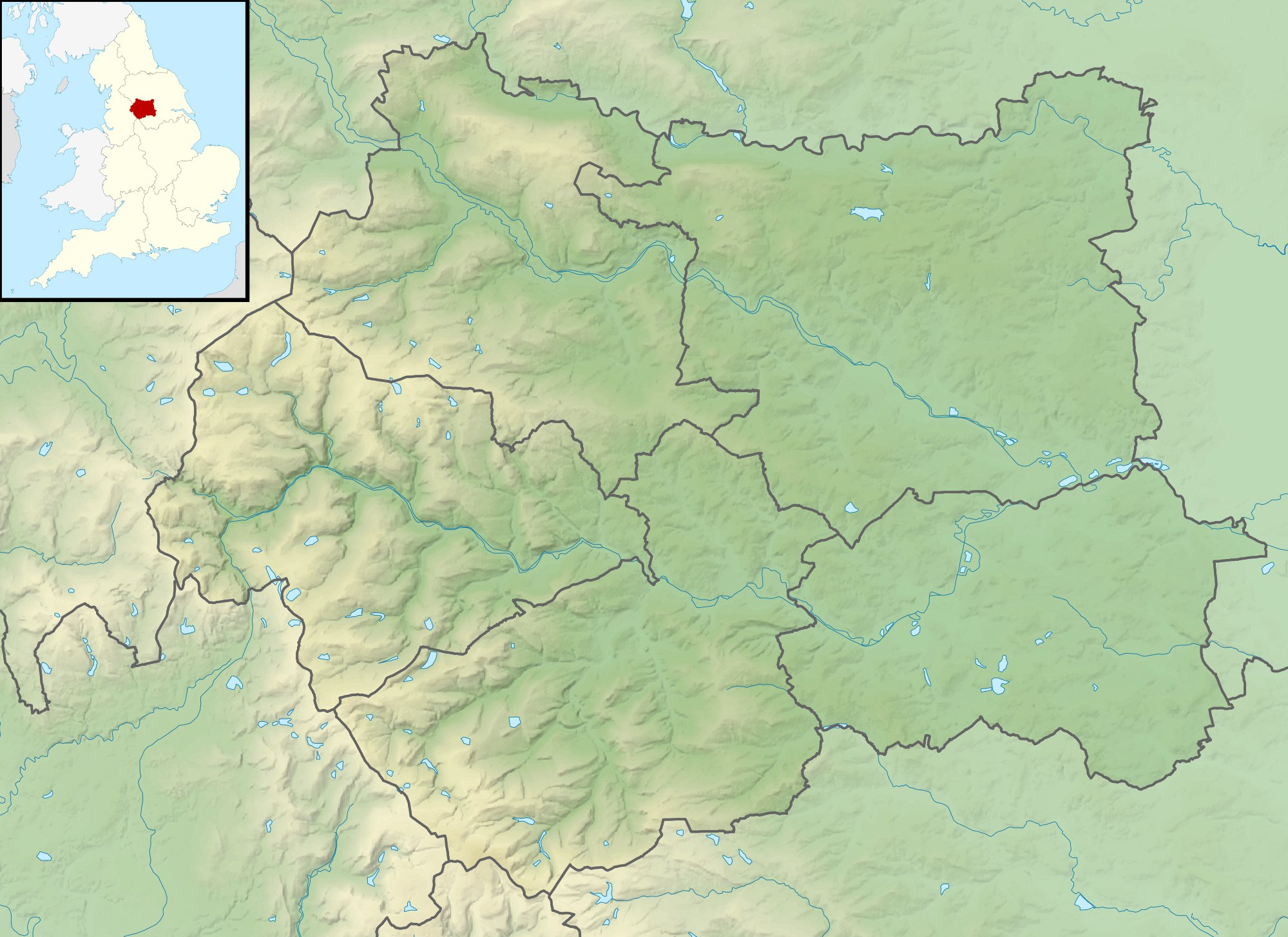
- Location within West Yorkshire
- 53.8597°N 1.8323°W
- Type: House
- Location: Bingley, West Yorkshire

History
- Built: C.1864

Site notes
- Architect(s): George Knowles & William Wilcox, William Burges & William Morris & Edward Burne-Jones
- Architectural style: Victorian
- Governing body: Privately owned

Listed Building – Grade II
- Official name: Oakwood Hall, Bingley
- Designated: 6 November 1973
- Reference no.: 1133355

Oakwood Hall, Bingley, West Yorkshire, England is a 19th-century mansion with interior fittings by the Victorian architect William Burges. The hall was constructed in 1864 by George Knowles and William Wilcock of Bradford for Thomas Garnett, a prosperous textile merchant. The style is "conventionally dour Gothic".

Garnett had the interiors designed by Burges, who contributed a fireplace, and by Morris & Co., for whom Edward Burne-Jones created the stained glass St. George in the staircase window, whilst Morris himself has been credited with the surrounding images of The Four Seasons.

The Hall is a Grade II Listed Building as at 6 November 1973 and is now a hotel.

== History ==
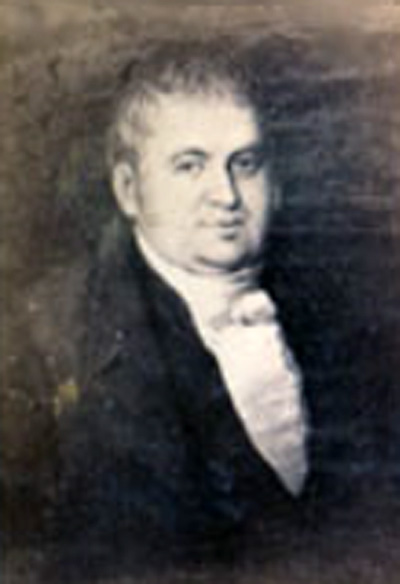
Thomas Garnett in 1863

Thomas Garnett (1833–1916) who built Oakwood Hall in 1864 was born in 1832 in Otley. His father was Peter Garnett who owned the Wharfeside Paper Mill in the town. In the 1850s he went into partnership with John Lawson Gillies to form the firm called Gillies Garnett and Co. They were cloth merchants and silk dyers. When Gillies died in 1879 Thomas became the sole owner of the company.

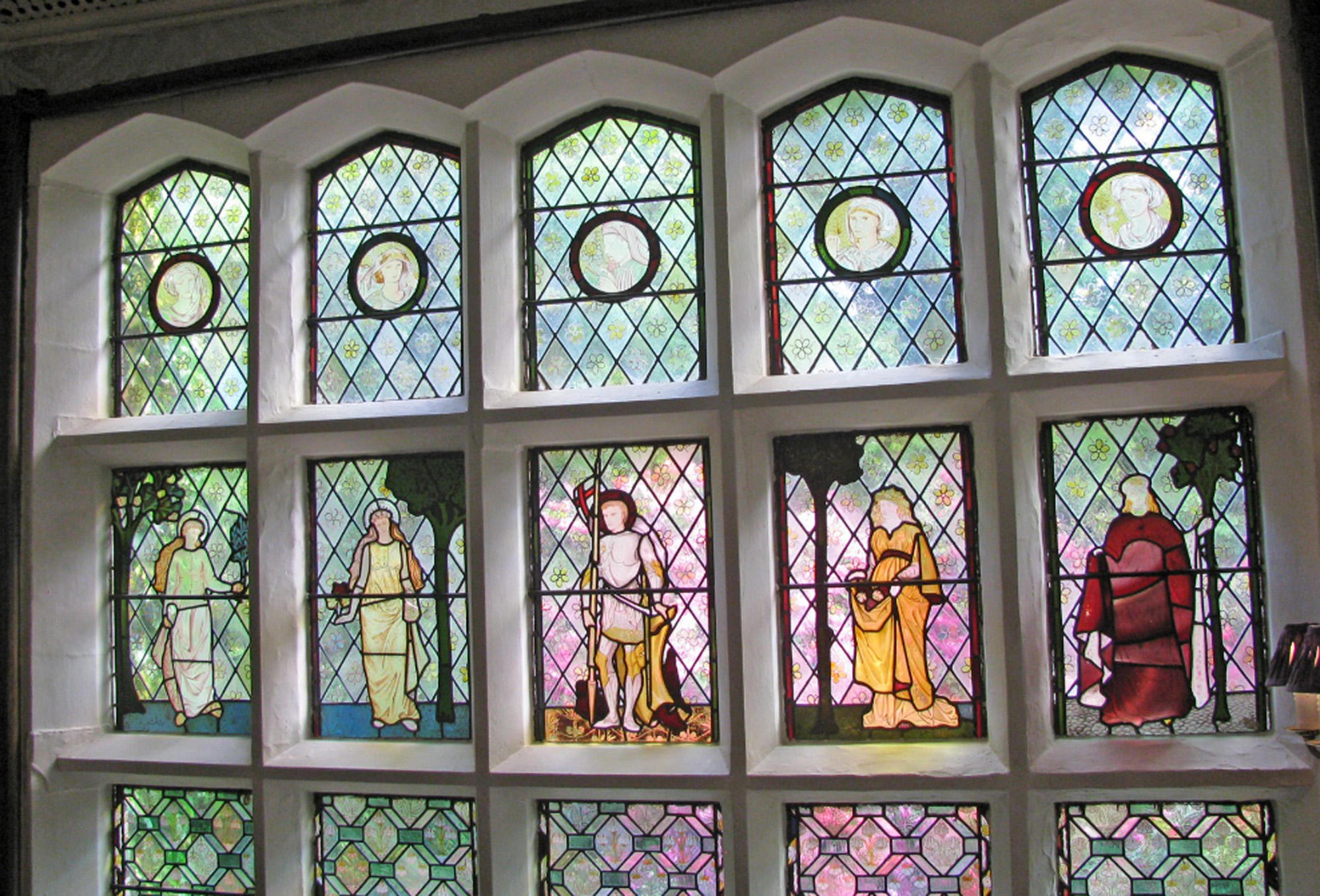
Stained glass windows

In 1862 he married Fanny Riley (1843–1916) and shortly after commissioned George Knowles and William Wilcock to build Oakwood Hall. William Morris and William Burges were employed for the interior fittings of his new home. William Morris is credited with the design of the stained glass windows at the top of the stairs. These show St George flanked by female figures of the Four Seasons as well as depicting Chaucer flanked by the heads of four female Chaucerian heroines. These windows have been described as “some of the finest early stained glass by Morris and Co. that has yet been discovered.”

The couple had six children. Thomas continued to manage his textile firm until about 1900. He also became a Director of the Bradford Banking Company and of the Hull and Barnsley Railway Company. His wife Fanny died 30 March 1916 and only a few days after her burial Thomas died. Their youngest son Harold Addison Garnett lived in the house for several years and then in about 1920 it was sold to the Hanson family.

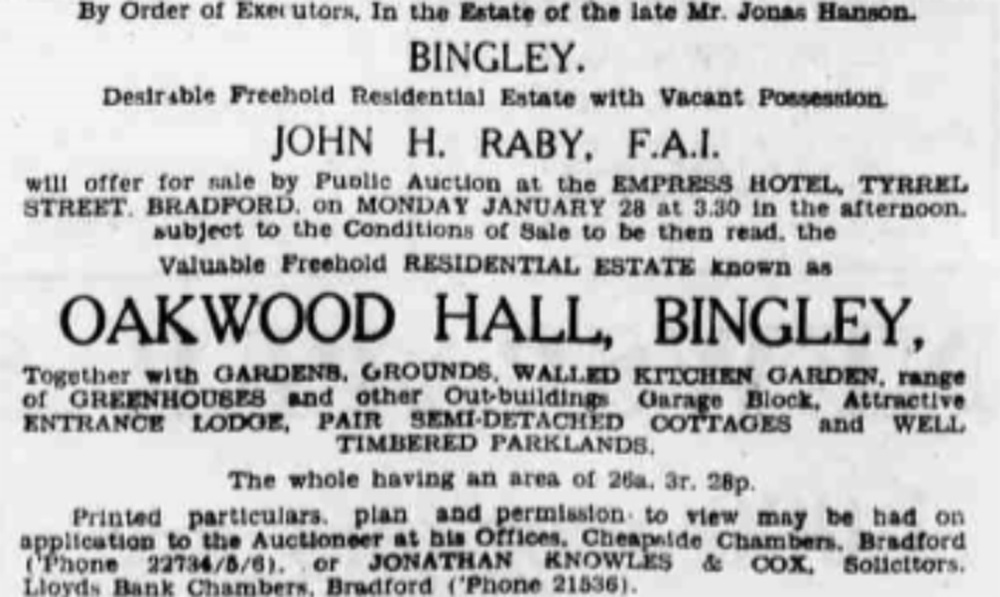
Sale notice for Oakwood Hall in 1952

Jonas Hanson (1869–1951) bought Oakwood Hall in about 1920. Hanson progressed from the status of weaving overlocker, as described in the 1891 census, to founding one of the largest cloth companies in Bradford called Parkland Manufacturing Company which continues to operate.

He was born in 1869 in Silsden, Yorkshire. His father Joshua Smith Hanson was a canal worker. In 1897 he married Sarah Jane Kay and the couple had three sons. He was a keen gardener and became President of the Bingley and District Allotment Association. He was also President of the Bingley Building Society for many years and of the Keighley Golf Club. He was President of the Shipley Division of the Conservative Club and held numerous garden parties for the Club at Oakwood Hall.

He died in 1951 at the age of 82 and in the following year his sons sold Oakwood to the Woods, a Bradford textile family. The hall now operates as a hotel.

== See also ==
- Listed buildings in Bingley
