= Paper Hall =

Building in Bradford, West Yorkshire, England

Coordinates: 53.7969°N 1.7447°W

Paper Hall is a Grade II* listed building in Bradford, West Yorkshire, England, noted for being the oldest domestic building in the city centre and for housing the city's first spinning machines. Its then owner James Garnett is credited with bringing the industrial revolution to Bradford, which became one of the manufacturing centres of Britain in the 19th century.

== Etymology ==
The origins of the name Paper Hall are obscure, although it has been in use since at least 1756, when the Stansfield family occupied it. Possible suggestions are a link to Catholic worship as a corruption of "Papist Hall", that it was the first building in Bradford to have wallpapered walls or that paper was the main product of a nearby mill.

== History ==
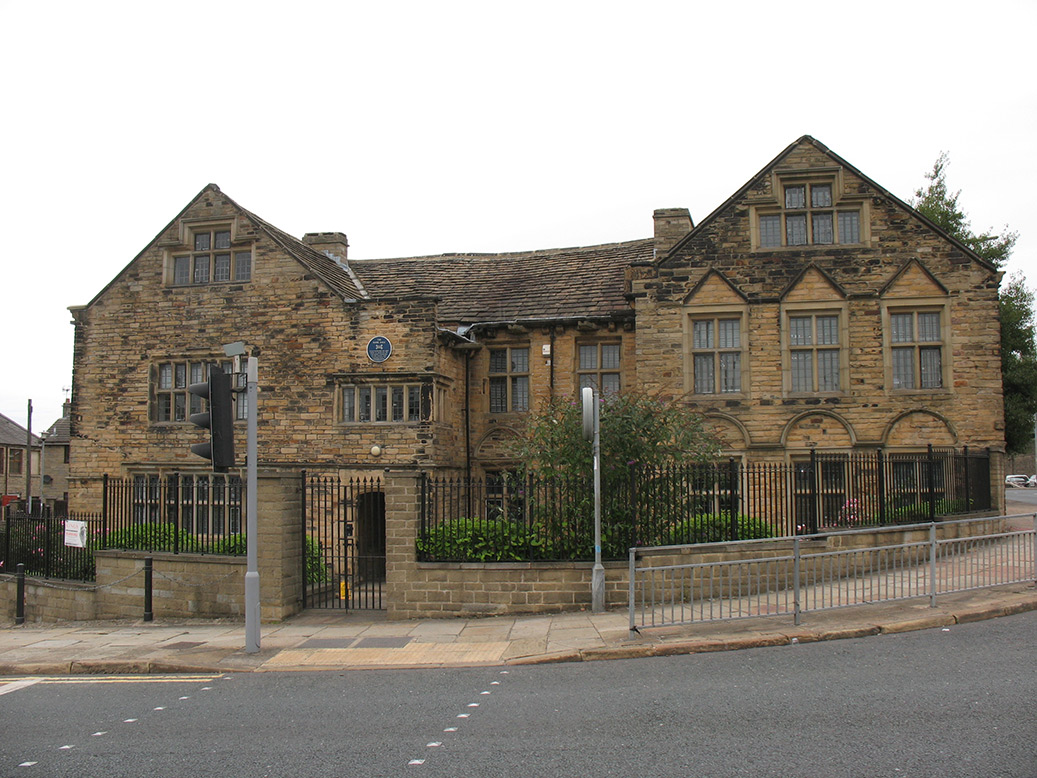
Paper Hall from Barkerend Road.

All accounts, including the building's blue plaque, suggest that the hall was built as a private house for William Rookes of Royds Hall in 1643. The original owner and the date are disputed by the geologist Herbert E. Wroot, who wrote in the Bradford Antiquary: The Journal of the Bradford Historical and Antiquarian Society (1900):

"The Hall was built, as an inscribed date over the main doorway shows, in the year 1648 ... A tradition exists in the neighbourhood of the Hall that the last figure of this date was tampered with some years ago, in consequence of a wager; and curiously, the artist who in the early part of this century made the sketches reproduced here – with, transcribed the date as "1643." But the most careful examination of the stone with a magnifying glass, lends no support to the allegation that the last figure has been altered."

Whether the original proprietor or not, William Rookes died in 1651, and the hall was then occupied by several different families, including Hugh Currer of Eldwick and the Weddells, a family of London lawyers. It has been suggested that the steep pediments over the windows to the right of the doorway were added circa 1700, which would have been under the Weddell's stewardship. In 1717 the Hall passed into the hands of the Stansfield family, a well known family in the area and later owners of Esholt Hall. Perhaps the hall's best known occupant was James Garnett, who acquired the hall in 1794 and lived there until his death in 1829. He is credited with bringing the industrial revolution to Bradford by installing a number of hand-worked spinning machines in the building's loft, very likely the first use in Bradford of Richard Arkwright's new invention. Sadly, by the mid-19th century, the hall had fallen into disrepair and was described in 1841 by the historian John James as in "a miserable state of dilapidation and neglect". It remained in that state until well into the twentieth century and was threatened with demolition in 1972. A Bradford University professor, Jimmy Ord-Smith, campaigned to have the building saved and initially raised funds by selling Christmas cards featuring an artist's impression of the refurbished hall. Work began in 1980 and was eventually completed in 1994 at a cost of £500,000. Today it is available for commercial use.
