= Brontë Birthplace =

House in West Yorkshire, England

Coordinates: 53.7910°N 1.84869°W

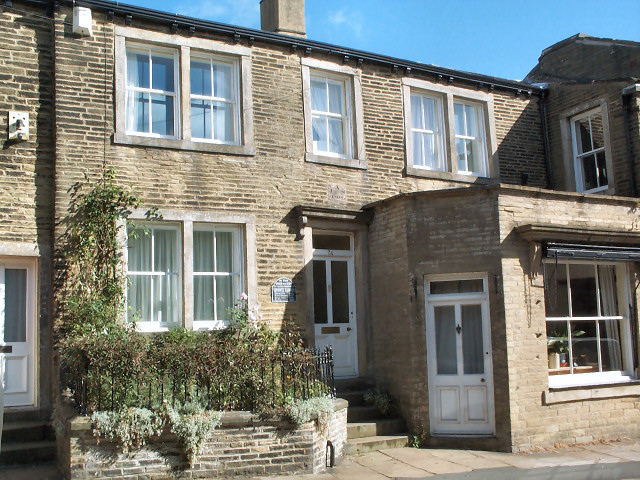
The Brontë Birthplace in 2005

The Brontë Birthplace is a house in Market Street, Thornton, West Yorkshire, England, where writers Anne, Charlotte and Emily Brontë, and their brother Branwell, were born between 1816 and 1820.

== Building ==
The house is a two-storey, three-bay terraced house built of sandstone in 1802. It is a grade II* listed building, identified as 72 and 74 Market Street.

== Brontë occupancy ==
The house was the parsonage when Patrick Brontë, his wife Maria and their two children, Maria (1814-1825) and Elizabeth (1815-1825), moved there on 15 May 1815. The literary sisters and their brother Branwell were all born in the house, and the family lived there until moving to Haworth in 1820 when Patrick was appointed curate there.

== Later history ==
A butcher's shop was added to the house front in the mid-19th century, and it was later used for various purposes including becoming flats. In the 2010s the house was in use as a cafe, named "Emily's", but it did not re-open after closing during the COVID-19 pandemic.

== 2022 - 2024 ==
A campaign to purchase the property for community use was established in July 2022, with the establishment of the Brontë Birthplace Steering Group, which worked in partnership with the existing charity the Thornton and Allerton Community Association Ltd (TACA). Brontë Birthplace Limited was set up as a Community Benefit Society in June 2023, independent of TACA, and produced a 7-year business plan in October 2023.

In November 2023 the future of the building was secured, to be restored and preserved as a cultural and educational centre and visitor attraction. A major contributor to the community share scheme was Nigel West, whose father Jim West had inherited the house and donated it to the church. Jim had inherited the house in 1959 from his aunt Florrie, who had been a cousin of Charlotte Brontë's husband Arthur Bell Nicholls. Another patron of the project was Duncan McCargo, a professor of global affairs and English at Nanyang Technological University, whose father's family grew up in Bradford. Supporters included television journalist Christa Ackroyd. Bradford City Council supported the project with a substantial grant linked to Bradford UK City of Culture 2025.

== 2025 - A Royal Opening ==
Exactly 210 years after the Brontës moved to the parsonage in Thornton, the Brontë Birthplace officially opened in May 2025. This day was celebrated with a royal visit from Her Majesty Queen Camilla. Over 600 people stood outside the house on Market Street to welcome Her Majesty to Thornton.

Since the grand opening, the Brontë Birthplace operates as a visitor experience centre, with a cafe and events space for the community. The house is furnished in the style of the Brontës' time and provides a hands-on experience, allowing visitors to walk in the footsteps of the literary icons. The three bedrooms upstairs are available for booking overnight stays, allowing for the unique experience of sleeping where the Brontë sisters once slept.

== 2026 - Royal Patronage ==
In June 2026, Her Majesty Queen Camilla accepted an invitation to become a Royal Patron of the Brontë Birthplace.
