= Scar Top =

Hamlet in West Yorkshire, England

Coordinates: 53.832°N 2.007°W

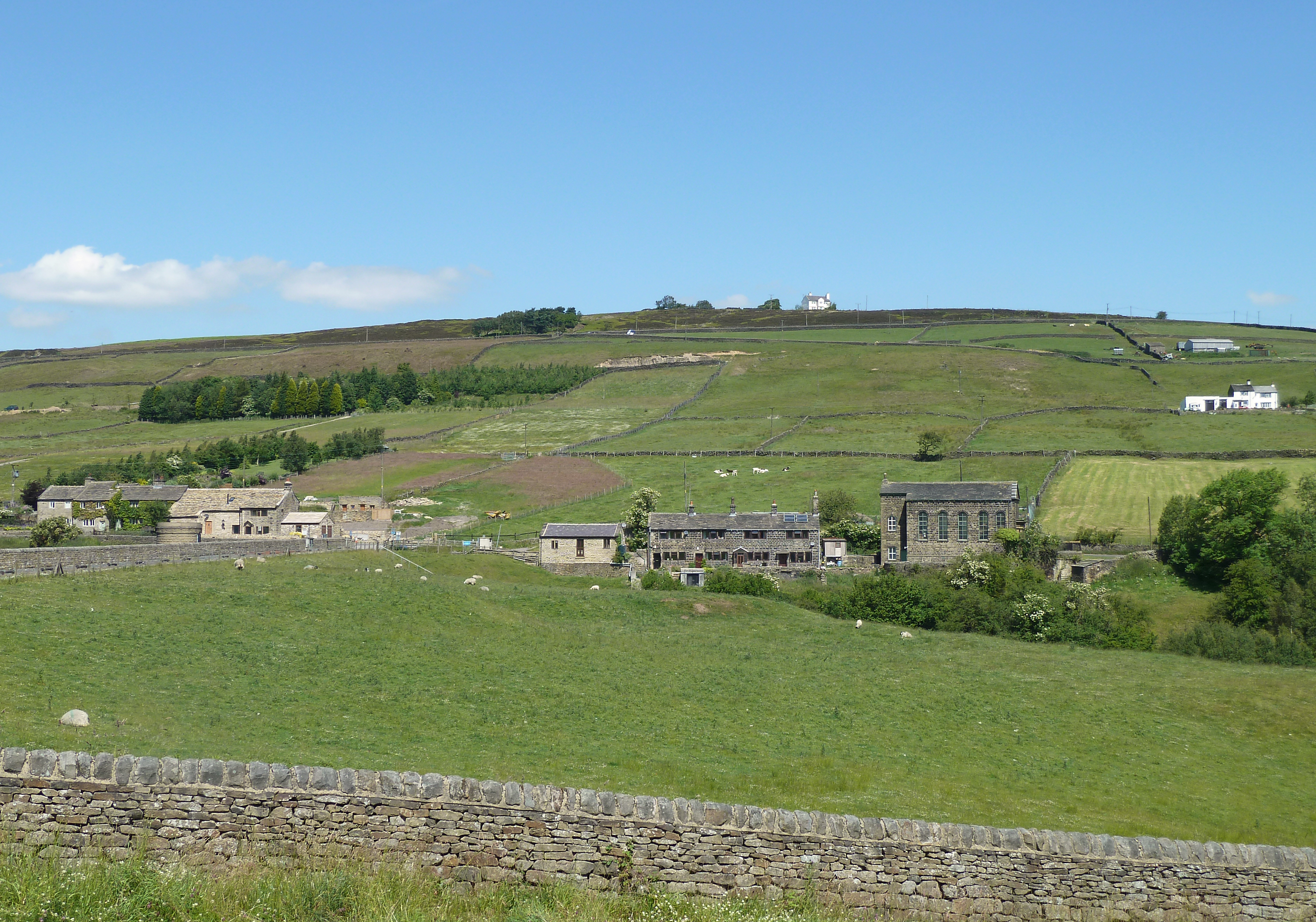
View of the hamlet

Scar Top is a farming hamlet near the tourist village of Haworth in the City of Bradford metropolitan borough, West Yorkshire in England. It is in the BD22 postcode area. Located west of Stanbury on a minor road connecting Haworth to Laneshaw Bridge, the hamlet contains a chapel, a farm and a collection of cottages; an infrequent bus service, route K14, runs to Keighley. Scar Top Chapel and Sunday School was built in 1869, replacing one built in 1818; it formerly belonged to the Methodists but since the 1970s has been independent. Ponden Mill, on the road to Haworth, was one of the main employers in the area. Moor Lodge, located northwest of the hamlet, is a former shooting lodge, built by Amos Nelson, that has been converted to a furniture and gift shop and tearooms'. It is thought to be the inspiration behind Ferndean Manor in Charlotte Brontë's Jane Eyre.

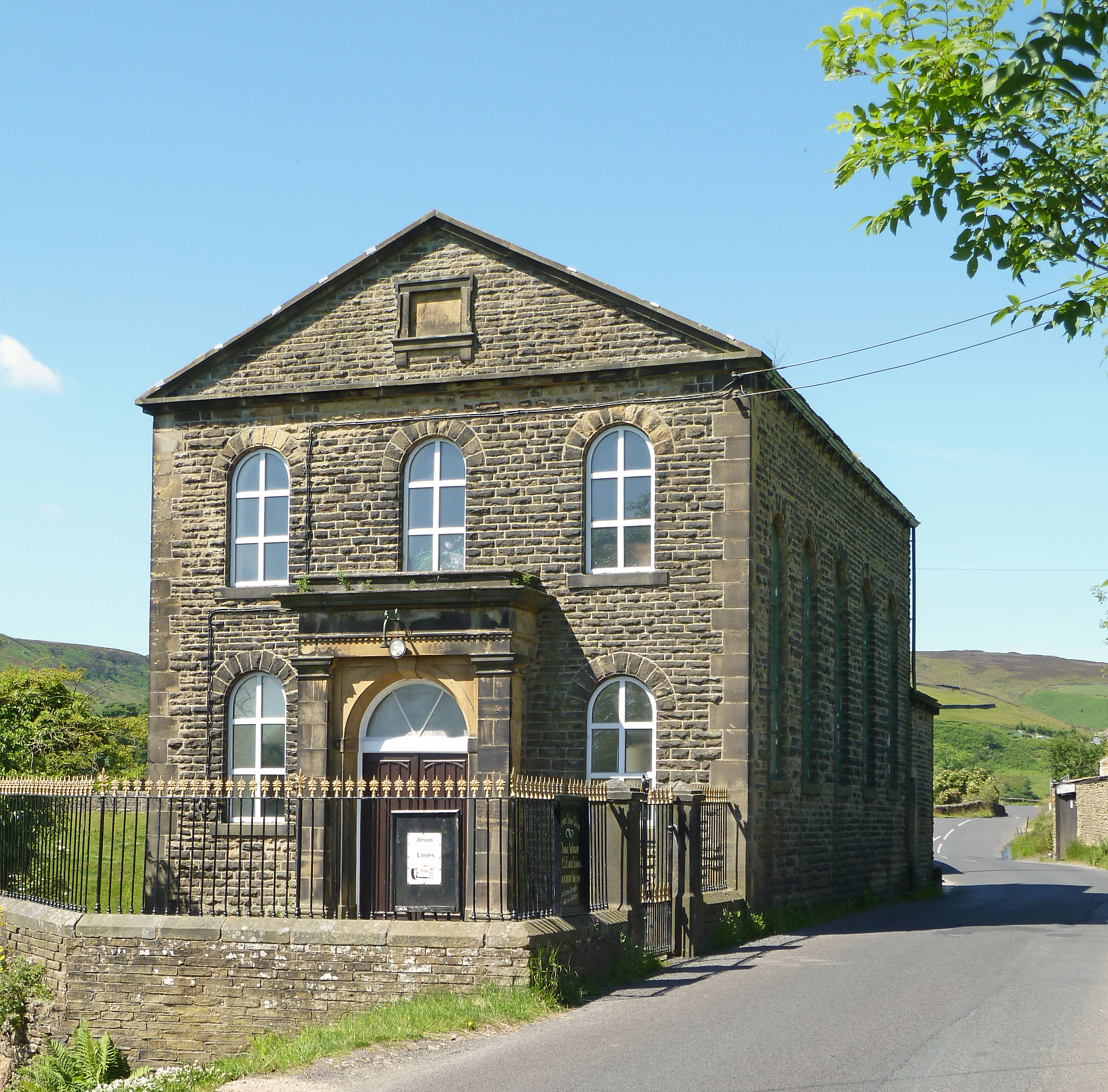
Scar Top Chapel and Sunday School

== See also ==
- Oldfield
