= The Pacific Review (Routledge journal) =

- Discipline: International relations; Asia-Pacific studies
- Language: English
- Edited by: Shaun Breslin (University of Warwick); Chris W. Hughes (University of Warwick)

Publication details
- History: 1988–present
- Publisher: Routledge (Taylor & Francis) (United Kingdom)
- Frequency: Bimonthly
- Open access: Hybrid
- Impact factor: 2.0 (2024)

Standard abbreviations
- ISO 4: Pac. Rev.

Indexing
- ISSN: 0951-2748 (print); 1470-1332 (web)
- OCLC no.: 18300850

Links
- Journal homepage; Online archive

The Pacific Review is a peer-reviewed academic journal that analyses political, security and economic developments across the Asia-Pacific region. Founded in 1988, it is published bimonthly by Routledge (Taylor & Francis) and co-edited by Shaun Breslin and Chris W. Hughes of the University of Warwick.

== History ==
The journal was launched in 1988 to provide a scholarly forum on the international interactions of the Pacific Basin. Over time it has expanded its coverage to include questions of regional order, economic statecraft and trans-national cultural exchange.

== Scope ==
Typical topics include:

- Regional and sub-regional security architectures
- Comparative political economy and economic integration
- Foreign-policy analysis of Asia-Pacific states
- Trans-national identity, culture and governance

== Abstracting and indexing ==
The Pacific Review is abstracted and indexed in, among others:

- Social Sciences Citation Index (Web of Science)
- Scopus
- EBSCO databases
- ProQuest databases

== Impact factor ==
According to the 2024 Journal Citation Reports, the journal has an impact factor of 2.0.

== See also ==
- Asian studies
- List of international relations journals
