= Bingley Five Rise Locks =

Staircase lock on the Leeds and Liverpool Canal at Bingley

Coordinates: 53.8558°N 1.8379°W

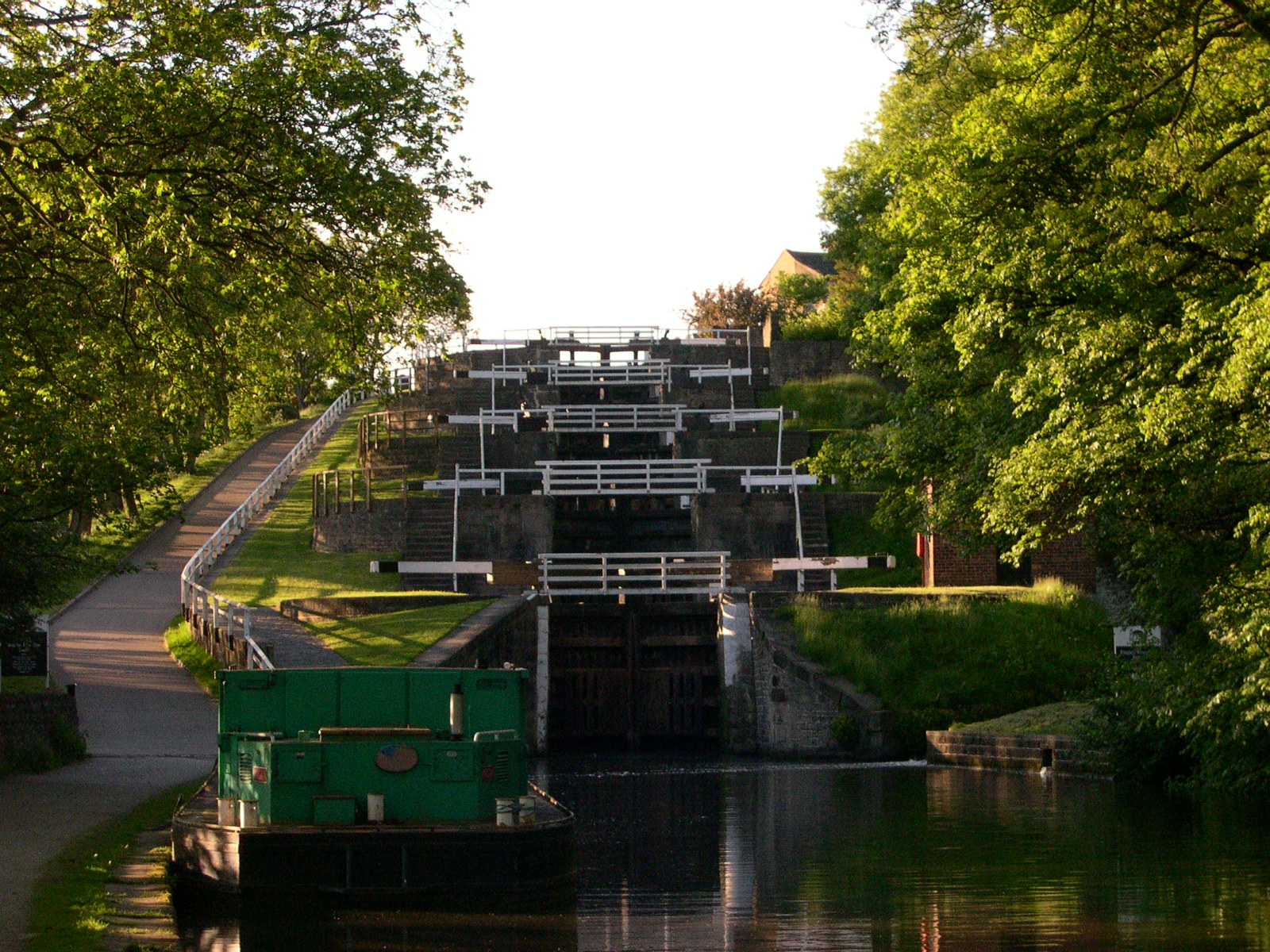
The Five Rise Locks from below

Bingley Five-Rise Locks is a staircase lock on the Leeds and Liverpool Canal at Bingley (grid reference SE107399). As the name implies, a boat passing through the lock is lifted or lowered in five stages.

== Description ==
In effect the five-rise consists of five locks connected without intermediate "ponds": the lower gate of each chamber forms the upper gate of the chamber below. There are therefore five chambers, and six gates. As the Leeds Liverpool canal is a wide canal, the chambers are slightly more than 14 feet (4.3 m) wide, and each gate consists of two half-gates, "hinged" from opposite sides of the canal. Each half gate is slightly more than 7 feet (2.1 m) wide, so that the two halves close in a "V" shape (pointing "upstream"). Water pressure on the uphill side of the gate keeps it tightly closed until the water levels on either side are equal, when the gate can be opened and the boat moved to the next chamber (see canal locks for more information on how a lock is constructed and operated).

The five-rise is the steepest flight of locks in the UK, with a gradient of about 1:5 (a rise of 59 ft 2 in (18.03 m) over a distance of 320 ft (98 m)). The intermediate and bottom gates are the tallest in the country. Because of the complications of working a staircase lock and because so many boaters (both first-time hirers and new owners) are inexperienced, a full-time lock keeper is employed and the locks are padlocked out of hours. Barry Whitelock, the lock keeper, worked here for almost 30 years, becoming closely associated with the flight. Barry was awarded an MBE in the 2007 New Year Honours List for "Services to Inland Waterways in the North" and retired in 2017 as the country's longest-serving lock keeper. The locks also have an overflow 'by-wash' at the side, which water runs down when the lock is not open. When a descending boat enters each lock chamber the water level rises slightly and the excess flows via an overflow channel at the side which runs into the main by-wash.

The structure is Grade I listed.

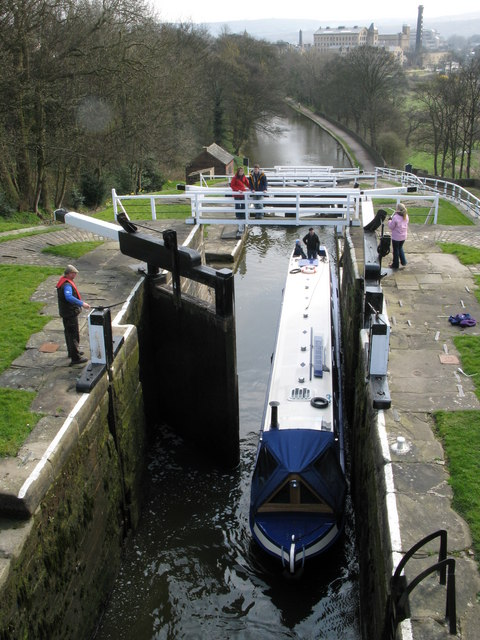
The locks from above with the Damart Mill in the distance.

== History ==
The five-rise opened on 21 March 1774 and was a major feat of engineering at the time. When the locks and therefore the canal from Gargrave to Thackley was opened in 1774, a crowd of 30,000 people turned out to celebrate. The first boat to use the locks took just 28 minutes. The first trip was described in the Leeds Intelligencer. The smaller Bingley Three Rise Locks opened at the same time just a few hundred yards downstream.

== Tourism ==
The staircase is a tourist attraction in the area. Boats that pass through often attract a crowd of gongoozlers.

== Maintenance ==
The staircase underwent extensive restoration in 2004 and again in 2006, when the lock gates and paddles were replaced. As is expected with such a feat of engineering it requires a lot of maintenance and is often on British Waterways' list of winter stoppages for maintenance.

In January 2012 the locks were drained to allow the installation of new lock gates. The new gates are made of English green oak and, taken together with the balance beam, weigh more than 5 tonnes.

== See also ==
- Grade I listed buildings in West Yorkshire
- Listed buildings in Bingley
- Foxton Locks near Market Harborough, Leicestershire
- Watford Locks in Northamptonshire
- Caen Hill Locks near Devizes, Wiltshire
- Fourteen Locks near Newport, South Wales
- Tardebigge Locks near Bromsgrove, Worcestershire
