= Bingley Urban District =

Former council in West Yorkshire, England

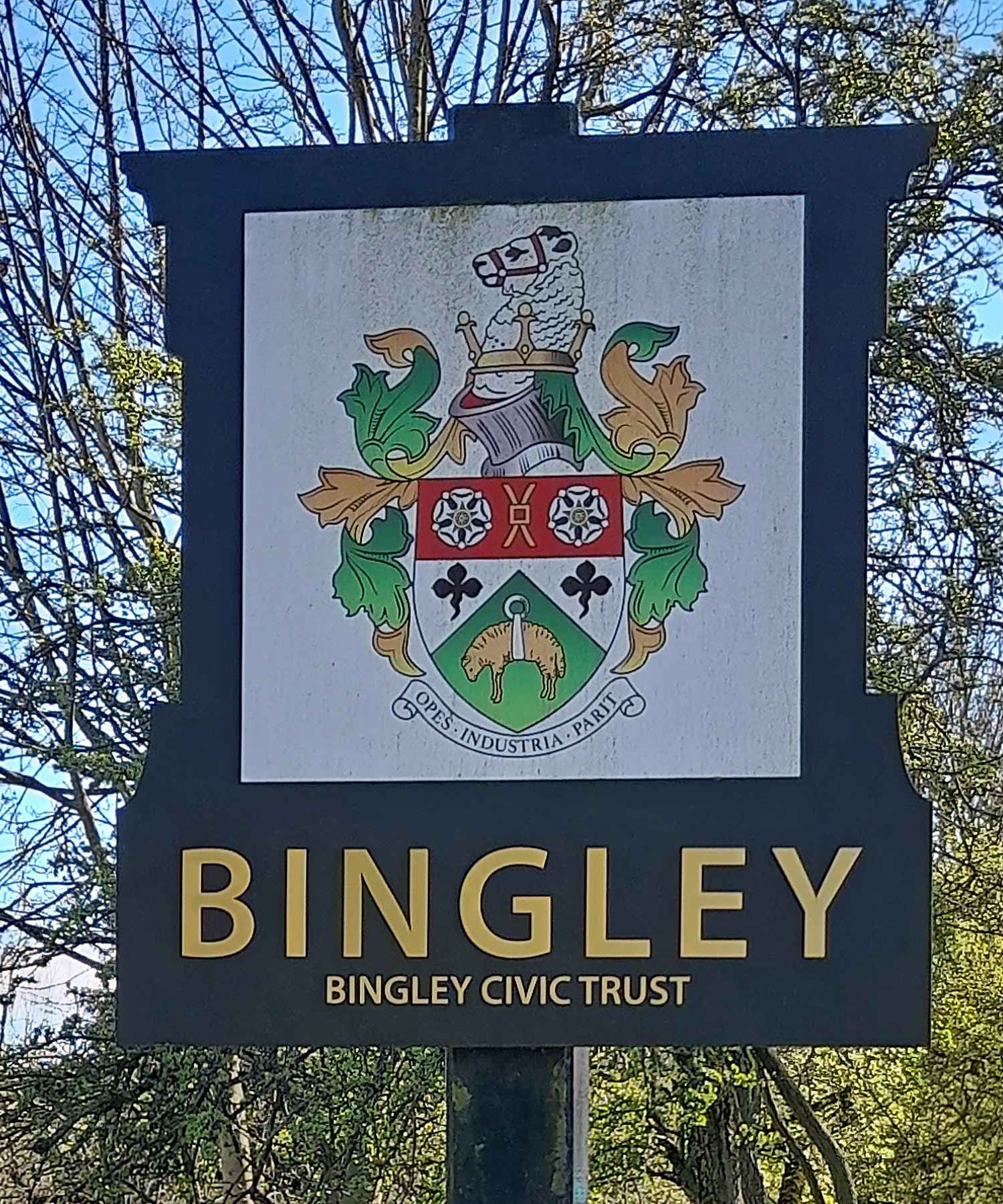
- The old Bingley Coat of Arms, on a sign on the road in from Crossflatts
- Area
  - Coordinates: 53.846°N 1.839°W
- Population
  - 1901: 18,449
  - 1961: 22,272 (Note: Not all census information is available for 1894 or 1974 (though 1971 would have been the last census before the BUDC was subsumed into Bradford Metropolitan District Council.))
- History
  - Preceded by: Bingley Improvement Commissioners
  - Origin: Local Government Act 1894
  - Created: 1894
  - Abolished: 1974
  - Succeeded by: Bradford Metropolitan District Council
- Status: Defunct
- Government
  - Type: Local government
  - HQ: Bingley Town Hall
  - Motto: Opes industria parit (Latin: Industry begets wealth)
- Map of boundary as of 1971

Bingley Urban District covered the town of Bingley, West Riding of Yorkshire, England, and its surrounding areas for 80 years between 1894 and 1974. It had replaced an Improvement Commissioners council, and the UDC itself was replaced in 1974 by the newly formed Bradford Metropolitan District Council. The urban district council had responsibility for many local services, including fire service and medical provision, which are now the remit of regional or national agencies.

In 2016, limited council control was returned to the town by the election of Bingley Town Council, but its remit and the area it controls are considerably smaller than the former UDC's authority.

== History ==
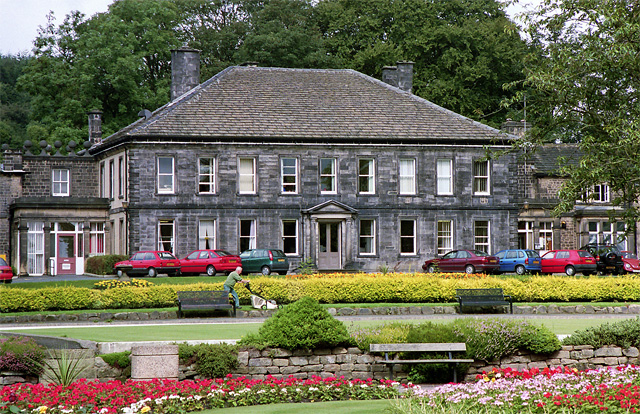
Myrtle Grove, which became the council headquarters in 1926

Bingley was given improvement commissioners in 1847 under a local act of Parliament, the Bingley Improvement Act 1847 (10 & 11 Vict. c. cclviii). This act was passed due to a great increase in the town's population, linked in with the arrival of the railway and increased industrialisation, which had in turn led to slum-like and squalid living conditions, which were recognised as needing improvement. The improvement commissioners' district only covered the built-up area of the town. In 1863 a separate local board was established to provide equivalent services and regulation for the surrounding remainder of the township of Bingley.

Under the Local Government Act 1894, improvement commissioners' districts and local board districts were both converted into urban districts. Bingley was unusual in having both types of district, one surrounding the other. The old improvement commissioners' district became Bingley Urban District, whilst the surrounding former local board district was named the "Bingley Outer Urban District". The outer district was abolished less than four years later in 1898, being absorbed into Bingley Urban District, which also took in the neighbouring Wilsden Urban District at the same time. However, this only occurred after a great debate about sewerage and other utilities, with Bradford Corporation wanting assurances that the new and larger area would not supply fresh water to areas under its control.

From the inception of Bingley Urban District Council (BUDC), it occupied a building on the main street that had been built in 1878 and had been occupied by a co-operative society.

Bingley Urban District Council Act 1901
- Act of Parliament
- Parliament of the United Kingdom
- Long title: An Act to authorise the Urban District Council of Bingley to purchase the undertaking of the Cullingworth Gas Company Limited to make certain street works and to make better provision for the health local government and improvement of the district and for other purposes.
- Citation: 1 Edw. 7. c. cxix

Dates
- Royal assent: 26 July 1901

=== 20th century ===
In 1904, the BUDC paid £14,000 to buy up some properties on the Old Main Street and part of the graveyard of All Saints Church. This enabled it to build the new main road straight past what is now the new fire station, and across the graveyard, cutting it into two sections. This required its own act of Parliament, the Bingley Urban District Council Act 1901 (1 Edw. 7. c. cxix), and the removal of interred bodies from the site, whilst the headstones were used to line the paths around the graveyard.

As a local council, it was responsible for public services such as a fire brigade, water supply, medical needs and power supplies (gas and electricity). The BUDC also controlled the public tips in the area; there were four of these in 1946: Dowley Gap, Cullingworth, Harden and Wilsden. BUDC invoked several bye-laws relating to public health in the district, and these covered slaughterhouses, markets, the cemetery, smoke abatement, recreation grounds, suppression of litter and even the sale of contraceptives in automated machines. On the social side, the BUDC organised community events such as a Boer War commemorative event in 1905 (for the 1899–1902 campaign) and promoted a visit by General Booth in 1907.

In February 1914, the BUDC enabled the Bradford tram system to be extended into Bingley from Nab Wood (Saltaire). It was opened through Bingley to Crossflatts by October 1914. This entailed the widening of Cottingley Bridge and affording at least a 40 feet (12 m) width on the Main Street in Bingley. The BUDC was also to be responsible for the supply of electricity, which they bought from the Keighley Corporation Tramways company. In 1928, the St Ive's estate was purchased for the area by the BUDC for £39,500. In 1923, certain offices of the BUDC (including some in the Mechanics Institute) were moved to Myrtle Grove, on the western side of the town in the rapidly developing Myrtle Park area. By 1926, all of the BUDC's operations had been transferred to Myrtle Grove, which had now become the Town Hall.

In 1936, many jobs that are now the responsibility of private enterprises, official regional, or national agencies, were undertaken by the BUDC. These included:

- Architect
- Baths superintendent
- Clerk and solicitor
- Electrical engineer
- Engineer and surveyor
- Fire brigade superintendent
- Gas engineer
- Headmaster, technical and evening institutes
- Health visitor and school nurse
- Librarian
- Manager of sewage disposal and inspector of trade wastes
- Medical officer of health
- Sanitary inspector
- Treasurer and accounting
- Water manager

The novelist John Braine worked for the BUDC in Bingley Library for several years in the 1950s. During this period, he wrote Room at the Top, which allowed him to give up his day job. However, some commented that the novel painted Bradford (and the wider area) as a "seedy, immoral place", and the BUDC criticised the library in Bingley for buying six copies of the novel.

By 1955, the BUDC was responsible for Bingley, Cottingley, Cullingworth, Eldwick, Flappitt, Gilstead, Harden, Low Springs, Ryecroft and Wilsden.

In 1974, the Bingley Urban District was merged into the newly formed Metropolitan District of Bradford, along with the other Aire Valley urban districts of Baildon, Ilkley, Shipley and Silsden, and the Municipal Borough of Keighley.

== Population ==
Population of the Bingley Urban area, 1901–1961
1901	1905	1911	1916	1921	1926	1931	1936	1939	1941	1946	1951	1956	1961
18,449	18,900	18,759	18,615	18,942	19,650	20,553	22,552	22,504	21,370	21,470	21,568	21,660 (Note: Estimated population)	22,272

== Chronology ==
- 1847 – 1894 Bingley Improvement commissioners, the precursor authority of the BUDC
- 1893 – Prince of Wales Park created (BUDC took on this responsibility on their formation one year later)
- 1894 – BUDC created
- 1898 – The Bingley Outer and Wilsden urban district councils were amalgamated into Bingley Urban District Council.
- 1902 – A new fire station was built on Elm Tree Hill (opposite Park Road), replaced by new station in 1973
- 1908 – Myrtle Park purchased for the town
- 1912 (onwards) – The Bingley Urban District Council Electric Lighting Order 1912 was passed which allowed for the provision of electricity in the town. This was extended to East Morton and West Morton in 1925
- 3 February 1914 – The Bradford Tram system was extended into Bingley from Nab Wood
- 1928 – Purchased the St Ives estate
- 31 March 1948 – Electricity generation and supply for the area was removed from the BUDC and vested in the Yorkshire Electricity Board (see Electricity Act 1947)
- 1948 – Gas, medical, fire, and ambulance services were removed from the BUDCs control into national and regional agencies: NHS for the medical work and West Riding County Council for the fire and ambulance provision
- 1974 – Opening of Bingley Arts Centre
- 1974 – Subsumed into Bradford District Council

== Notable people ==
- John Braine, worked for the BUDC in Bingley Library in the 1950s
- Tom Snowden, chairman of BUDC between 1921 and 1922
- Pat Wall, worked for the BUDC in 1973, later became MP for Bradford North
