= List of settlements in West Yorkshire by population =

This is a list of settlements in West Yorkshire by population based on the results of the 2011 census. The next United Kingdom census will take place in 2021. In 2011, there were 50 built-up area subdivisions with 5,000 or more inhabitants in West Yorkshire, shown in the table below.

== Administrative boundaries ==
Borough (Governing centre)		Other places
1	City of Leeds (Leeds)	Allerton Bywater, Beeston, Boston Spa, Collingham, Garforth, Guiseley, Harewood, Headingley, Holbeck, Horsforth, Kippax, Kirkstall, Ledsham, Ledston, Methley, Middleton, Morley, New Farnley, Otley, Oulton, Pool-in-Wharfedale, Pudsey, Rothwell, Rawdon, Scarcroft, Scholes, Stourton, Swillington, Walton (Leeds), Wetherby, Yeadon
2	City of Wakefield (Wakefield)	Ackworth, Alverthorpe, Castleford, Crigglestone, Crofton, Durkar, Fairburn Ings, Featherstone, Ferrybridge, Fitzwilliam, Hemsworth, Horbury, Knottingley, Newmillerdam, Normanton, Nostell, Ossett, Outwood, Pontefract, Ryhill, Sandal, Sharlston, Stanley, Walton (Wakefield), West Bretton
3	Kirklees (Huddersfield)	Almondbury, Batley, Birkby, Birkenshaw, Birstall, Cleckheaton, Dalton, Denby Dale, Dewsbury, Emley, Golcar, Gomersal, Hartshead, Hartshead Moor, Heckmondwike, Holmfirth, Honley, Kirkburton, Kirkheaton, Linthwaite, Liversedge, Marsden, Meltham, Mirfield, New Mill, Norristhorpe, Roberttown, Scammonden, Shelley, Shepley, Skelmanthorpe, Slaithwaite, Thornhill
4	Calderdale (Halifax)	Bailiff Bridge, Boothtown, Brighouse, Copley, Cragg Vale, Elland, Greetland, Hebden Bridge, Heptonstall, Hipperholme, Holywell Green, Luddendenfoot, Mytholmroyd, Norwood Green, Rastrick, Ripponden, Shelf, Shibden, Sowerby Bridge, Todmorden
5	City of Bradford (Bradford)	Addingham, Baildon, Bingley, Burley-in-Wharfedale, Cottingley, Crossflatts, Cullingworth, Denholme, East and West Morton, Eccleshill, Eldwick, Esholt, Gilstead, Harden, Haworth, Ilkley, Keighley, Menston, Oakworth, Oxenhope, Queensbury, Riddlesden, Saltaire, Sandy Lane, Shipley, Silsden, Stanbury, Steeton, Thornbury, Thornton, Tong, Undercliffe, Wilsden

== Population ranking ==
The 5 largest settlements of the county of West Yorkshire, with cities in bold, district centres in yellow.
The 6th to 11th largest settlements of the county of West Yorkshire.
The 12th to 19th largest settlements of the county of West Yorkshire.
The 20th to 25th largest settlements of the county of West Yorkshire.

#	Settlement	Population	
#	Settlement	2001	2011
1	Leeds	445,260	474,632
2	Bradford	309,020	349,561
3	Huddersfield	147,280	162,949
4	Wakefield	96,290	99,251
5	Halifax	83,440	88,134
6	Batley	76,270	80,485
7	Dewsbury	57,780	62,945
8	Keighley	48,920	53,331
9	Castleford	36,300	39,192
10	Brighouse	31,870	33,286
11	Pudsey	31,850	32,216
12	Morley	27,480	29,673
13	Pontefract	28,250	29,305
14	Shipley	26,040	28,694
15	Bingley	19,890	22,493
16	Holmfirth	20,138	21,706
17	Normanton	20,280	21,317
18	Ossett	21,076	21,231
19	Yeadon	20,270	19,668
20	Rothwell	19,400	19,512
21	Mirfield	18,390	19,330
22	Horsforth	18,930	18,895
23	Liversedge	16,930	17,697
24	Baildon	15,569	15,944
25	Elland	14,560	15,625
26	Garforth	15,394	14,838
27	Ilkley	13,828	14,809
28	Otley	14,641	14,215
29	Knottingley	13,797	13,971
30	Heckmondwike	10,717	12,085
31	Guiseley	11,130	11,960
32	Todmorden	11,555	11,690
33	Cleckheaton	10,480	11,648
34	Wetherby	11,710	11,242
35	Featherstone	11,660	11,060
36	South Elmsall	10,211	10,366
37	Horbury	10,002	10,361
38	Kippax	10,422	10,083
39	Hemsworth	9,145	9,246
40	South Kirkby	8,220	8,533
41	Silsden	7,681	7,912
42	Meltham	7,382	7,836
43	Burley	6,400	7,041
44	Haworth	6,078	6,379
45	Upton	6,070	5,874
46	Shepley	5,242	5,444
47	Thornton	4,998	5,289
48	Ackworth	4,784	5,281
49	Crofton	5,414	5,258
50	Ryhill	4,731	5,150
51	Allerton Bywater	3,950	4,717
52	Ripponden	3,780	4,665
53	Boston Spa	4,628	4,662
54	Sowerby Bridge	4,420	4,601
55	Skelmanthorpe	4,141	4,549

== See also ==
- West Yorkshire
- West Yorkshire Urban Area
