= John Nicholson (poet) =

English poet (1790–1843)

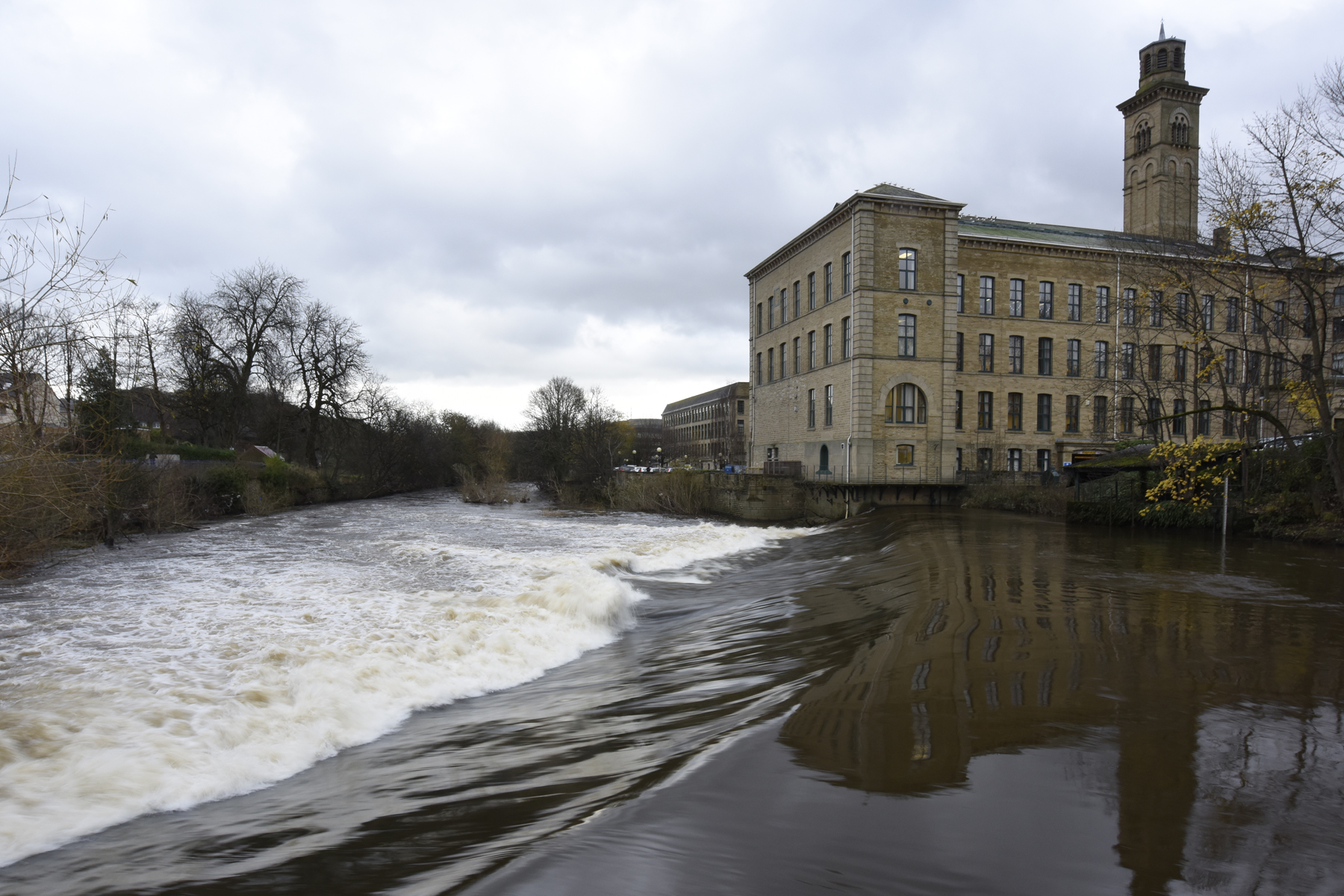
- A view looking south over the weir on the River Aire in Saltaire.
- Born: 29 November 1790; Weardley, Harewood, West Riding of Yorkshire
- Died: 13 April 1843 (aged 52); Saltaire
- Occupations: Poet, woolcomber
- Writing career
- Movement: Romanticism

John Nicholson (29 November 1790 – 14 April 1843) was popularly known as the Airedale Poet and also as the Bingley Byron. His most notable work was Airedale in Ancient Times. He died trying to cross the swollen River Aire near to Dixon Mill in (what is now) Saltaire.

== Early life ==
Nicholson was born in Harewood, Leeds and was moved with the rest of the family to Eldwick, near Bingley, West Riding of Yorkshire in his infancy. He was educated on the moorland above Baildon and he was employed to pick heather whilst he repeated the lessons laid down to him by the schoolmaster, Briggs. The heather was used to make besoms, as the master did not have enough scholars to pay his way.

By the age of eight, he began to show a predilection for poetry when he wrote on his maternal grandfather's barn door; 'Good god of truth, take Mat and Ruth, unto the heavenly throne, then good old Frank, may live in crank, and be disturb'd by none.' These lines were written in response to two people who were haranguing his grandfather.

His education at twelve years old consisted of a final year at Bingley Grammar School tutored by Dr Hartley. Under Dr Hartley he flourished and with 'attention and good studies' he progressed well. He became good friends with Dr Hartley after his schooling, even so much so that Dr Hartley edited Airedale in Ancient Times for him.

At the age of thirteen, he was put to work in his father's mill as a woolsorter. His parents had high ambitions for him, but in spite of this, he remained a woolsorter (or woolcomber) for the rest of his life alongside writing poetry.

At night he would devour the works of John Milton, Shakespeare and Alexander Pope by candlelight and when his mother confiscated his candles, he made his own from a mustard pot, a cotton cord for a wick and olive oil to burn. Literary appreciation was his only shared ideal with his father, Thomas Nicholson, who on wild winter nights, would read the collected works to his family beside the fireplace.

== Adulthood and marriages ==
John Nicholson did not prosper as a woolsorter and when his father was away from their home, he would take himself off across the moors or into the dells around Eldwick and read or play his Hautboy. He was quite accomplished on the Hautboy and his skill at this would introduce him to his first wife, Mary Driver, whom he met whilst playing at a wedding they both attended. They married when he was 19 and she 18.

In 1810, not too long after the marriage, whilst delivering twins, Mary died in childbirth. Though one of the twins survived, Nicholson was disconsolate and pledged himself to the Wesleyan community. His father, mother and grandfather were all Wesleyan activists and driven by their fervour for Methodism, he willingly abandoned his previous activities and 'Took The Pledge' with the Temperance Society. He even buried his Hautboy on the moor as a token to his newfound religious direction, though he did carve his name into a rock in Eldwick. This rock is still, to this day, known as 'Nicholson's Rock.'

He became a preacher in the Bingley area and was well known for his original and zealous sermons which were peppered with quotes from Robert Blair and Edward Young. In 1813, after a probation of 18 months, he married again. His second wife was Martha Wild of Bingley. The marriage and the lack of probation time as a preacher (four years was required) prevented him from becoming a full-time minister and he left the Wesleyans in 1815.

He was well known for his compassion and understanding. As part of the West Riding Militia during the Napoleonic fighting in the Iberian Peninsula, he was billeted at Pontefract. Whilst on drill, a boy hurt his head when knocked to the ground and when drill was over, Nicholson sought out the boy's family, made reparations and accosted his Colonel for knocking the boy over in the first place. Later, in Bradford, he paid for a destitute sailor to have bed and board after discovering he was a veteran of Trafalgar.

== Publishing ==
In 1818, he moved his family to Red Beck and worked in Shipley Fields Mill. These were his happiest days, when he could write and work and the family was not too big (he eventually had nine sons and daughters, eight with Martha and one surviving twin from his marriage to Mary). He was said to be knowledgeable and was well liked within the area. This led to him being commissioned to write a play, The Robber of the Alps, which was swiftly followed by another play, The Siege of Bradford, based upon events from the civil war.

In 1822 he moved to Harden Beck and wrote beside the river and rose in the early morning to sit by rocks overlooking the valley and write his poetry. It was here that Airedale in Ancient Times was finished and it had its first print run in April 1825. Such was his fame in the area, that the first print run sold out very quickly and the second edition was printed in November of the same year.

After the success of Airedale in Ancient Times, he embarked upon selling his books across the north of England and abandoned his former job as a woolcomber. Despite some reports that he spent all the money he earned on drink, his sons attested that he always came home with pockets full. In 1827 he undertook his first trip to London to try and sell his poetry there too. Whilst out with friends in Drury Lane, Nicholson was left to his own devices and was quite drunk. He argued with a statue of Shakespeare and caused such a racket that he was imprisoned overnight and tried before a judge next morning. By all accounts, the trial was a humorous affair and the judge released him without charge, but not before Nicholson dragged the officer who arrested him around the court in retaliation for how he had been treated the night before.

Nicholson left London soon after in case his wife heard of his antics through the papers and came to collect him. Despite the early trip to London going wrong, he visited London once more, though this time Martha accompanied him to ensure he remained out of trouble. Whilst there, they buried one of their children who had died in infancy.

On his return to Yorkshire, the family moved to Saltaire and Nicholson took to work for Sir Titus Salt, whom he viewed as a kind benefactor. In spite of Sir Salt's avowed distaste for alcohol, he overlooked the fact that Nicholson was drinking more and more, year on year.

== Death ==
Nicholson liked to go out onto the moors and breathe in the air to get away from the smoke of Bradford. Every holiday he would spend on the moors and on Good Friday 1843 (April 13) he set out to visit his aunt. On the way he visited several 'places' and by the time he came to the stepping stones (known locally as the Hippings) across the River Aire at (what is now) Saltaire, he was quite drunk. He slipped and fell into the water and was carried down the river for a short distance. He managed to haul himself out of the river, but he died on the riverbank. His body was taken to the Bay Horse Inn at Baildon and he was buried in Bingley All Saints Graveyard on the 18 April 1843.

His funeral was attended by a thousand mourners and a friendly benefactor paid for the gravestone. He left behind his second wife, Martha and eight children. By 1858, the stepping stones in the River Aire had been removed and a campaign was underway to raise money for the family Nicholson left behind. Queen Victoria personally sent £5 to the family.

== Selected works ==
=== Plays ===
- The Robber of the Alps (1820)
- The Siege of Bradford (1820)

=== Poems ===
- Airedale in Ancient Times
- The Lyre of Ebor
- The Poacher
- Elwood and Elvina
- Genius and Intemperance
- The Drunkard's Retribution
- The Fall of Belshazzar
- Airedale's Beauties
- Bingley's Beauties
- January
- Evening in April
- May Day
- Morning in May
- Mary of Marley
- The Maid of Lowdore
- An Old Oak Tree in Bradford
- On Visiting a Workhouse
- The Malt Inn Fire
- The Snowdrop
- A Place of Rural Retirement
- The Vale of Ilkley
- The Hunter's Dirge
- Female Constancy
- The Faithful Wife
- Song (The Lament for Elvina)
- Alas, Where are they?
- The New Church at Wilsden
- Return of the Swallow
- Man's Little Life's a Life of Care
- A Night Scene
- Psalm xviii
- Psalm cxiv
- Psalm cxlviii
- Solemn Reflections
- The Absent Lover
- The Dying Lover
- Love sans Reason
- I Will Love Thee, Mary
- Mary, I Will Think of You
- Ode to Laura
- True Affection
- The Deserted Maid
- A Fragment (Dialogue on Love)
- Appeal of the Spanish Refugees
- Elegy on the Death of Lord Byron
- On the Death of the Poets Child in London
- On Returning from London
- Song for a Wounded Seaman
- On a Young Lady Drowned in the Strid
- To the Critics
- The Siege of Bradford in 1642

== Modern times ==
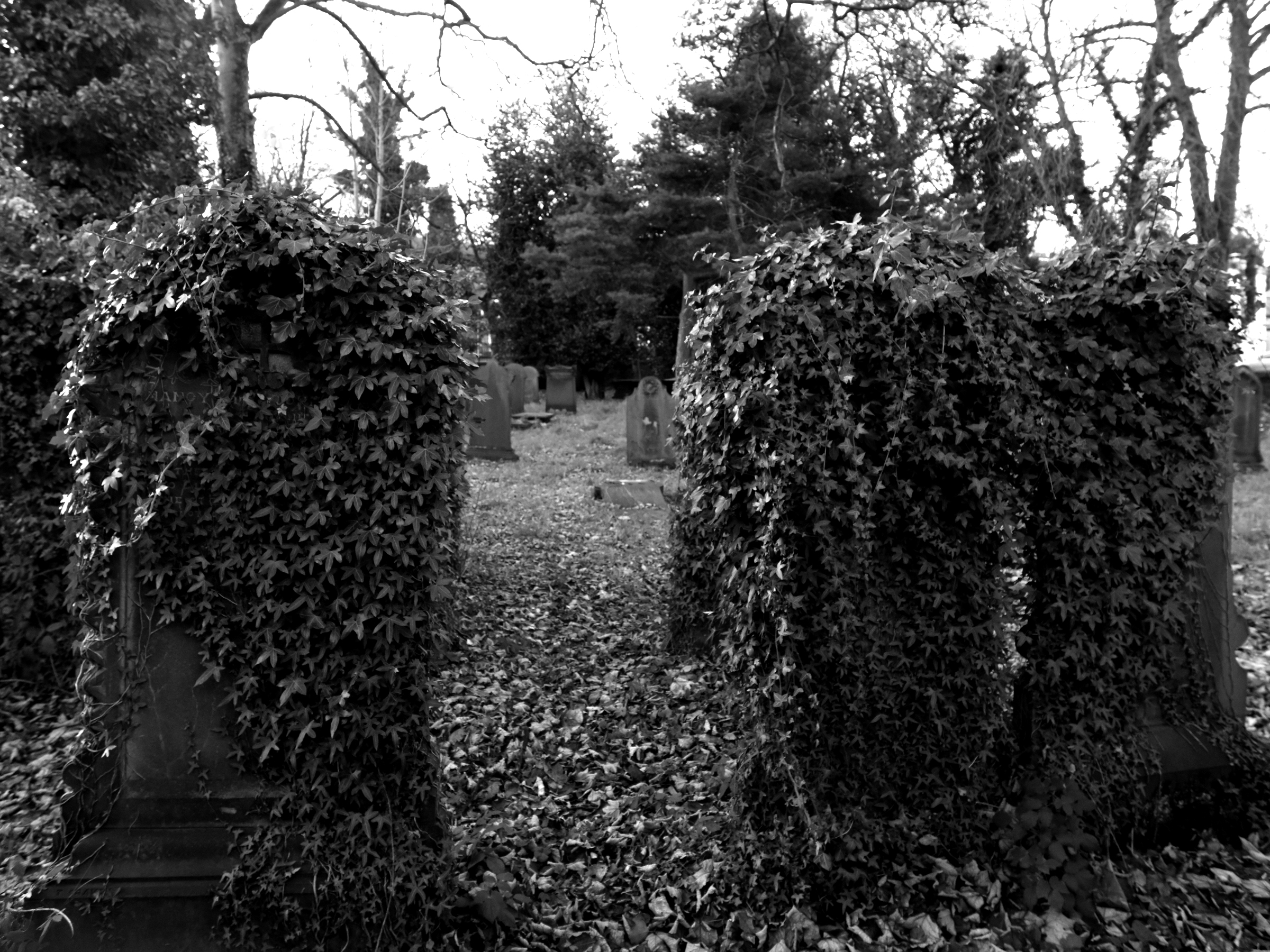
This is a view looking westwards over the graveyard. Beyond the trees is the road, the building of which necessitated the removal of many graves, John Nicholson's being among them

Some of Nicholson's original manuscripts can be found in Saltaire and Keighley libraries. These manuscripts belonged to members of Nicholson's family and were donated in the late 19th century.

In 1904, the graveyard surrounding Bingley All Saints Parish Church was bisected by the building of a new road. During this construction many graves were moved and the gravestones were used as flags to line the pathways around the church. It was during this period of reconstruction that John Nicholson's gravestone was destroyed. His first wife's gravestone is located in the western part of the churchyard just south west of the main entrance into the church.

A play was written about the poet and first performed in 1993 in Salts Mill just metres from where the poet died. Poetry or Bust written by Tony Harrison is a tragi-comic tale that relates the life and sad death of the Airedale Poet. Tony Harrison has a bust of John Nicholson in his house.

The Saltaire Sentinel runs a poetry competition each year entitled 'The John Nicholson Poetry Prize.' In 2011 the John Nicholson Prize was won by the Derbyshire Poet Martin Ward with the poem 'Saltaire at 13 O'clock. Martin Ward is sometimes known as 'The Runner Poet', and his published works include 'The Beresford Monuments' and 'Seven Women Dancing' from the anthology 'A Place of Wonder' published by Templar Poetry.

A plinth commemorating the poet was installed at the Prince of Wales Park, Bingley, in 1870. The plinth was funded by public donation.
