= Prince of Wales Park =

Park in Bingley, West Yorkshire, England

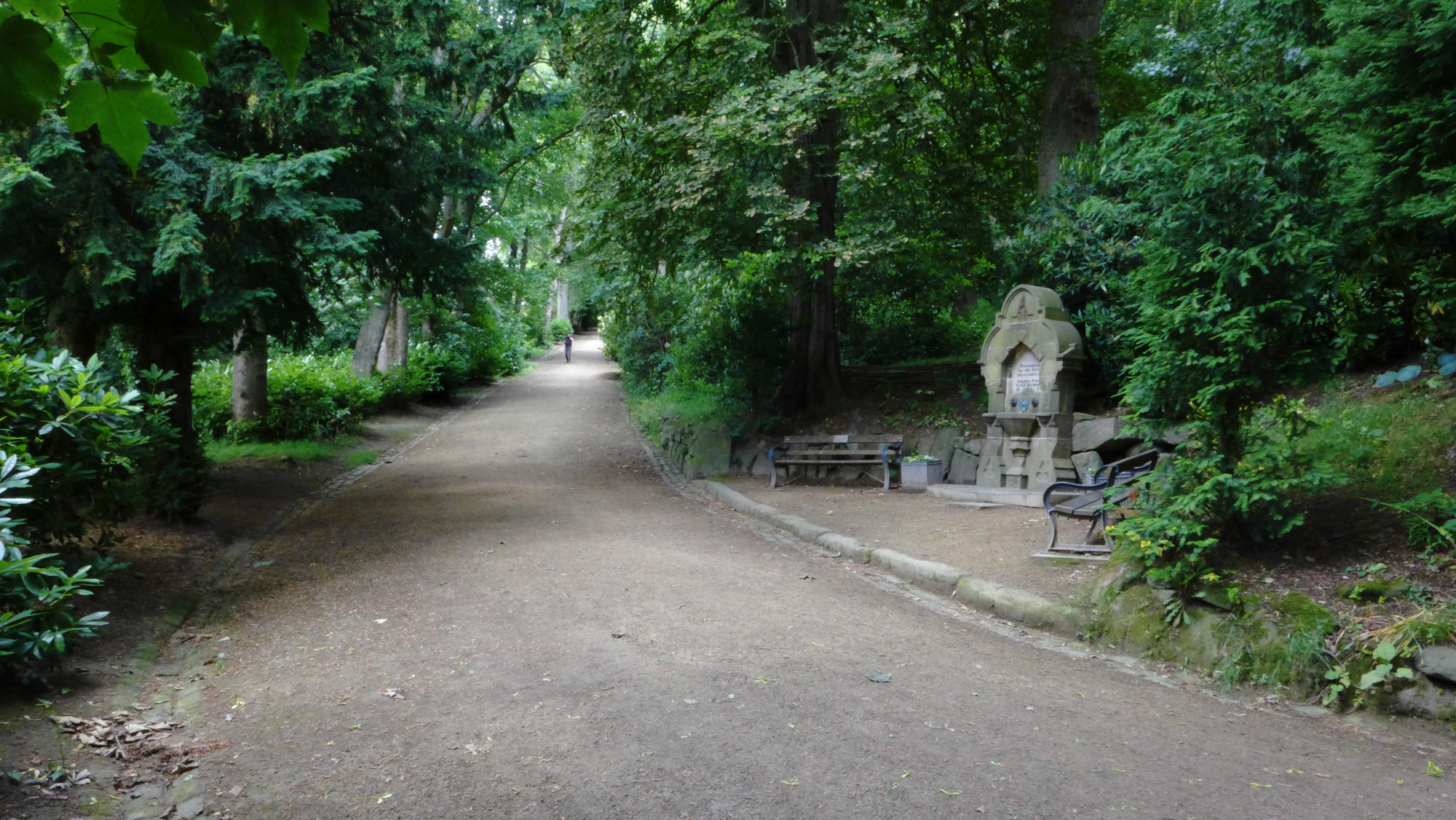
- The Temperance Drinking Fountain, Prince of Wales Park
- Interactive map of Prince of Wales Park
- Location: Bingley, West Yorkshire, England
- OS grid: SE115401
- Coordinates: 53.856°N 1.825°W
- Area: 20 acres (8.1 ha)
- Designated: Grade II Listed
- Open: Open all year
- Website: bradforddistrictparks.org/park/prince-of-wales-park/

Prince of Wales Park is a grade II listed public space between Bingley and Eldwick, in West Yorkshire, England. The park was built on moorland and an old quarry, and was opened in 1865. It was named after the then Prince of Wales who was married on the day that the first sod of earth was being turned to make the park. It was renovated in 2015 for its 150th anniversary.

== History ==
A meeting was held in Bingley in February 1863, and it was decided that a committee of people would oversee the construction and maintenance of a park for the people of Bingley. The committee would be formed from twenty-one ordinary citizens of Bingley, the churchwardens and the overseers of an enclosure trust. It was decided that the park should not be used for "...gambling or other demoralising games, discussions on politics, religion, theology, or lectures are to be allowed in the park; no intoxicating liquors are to exposed or offered for sale, nor are any bands of music to play their on Sundays. The first sod of the park was turned on 10 March 1863, on the same day as the marriage of the then Prince of Wales, hence the name of the park. (Note: Originally, the intent had been to name the site simply as the People's Park.) The Prince of Wales later sent to the people of Bingley pine trees from the Sandringham estate for planting in the park. Initially, 10 acres (4 ha) was awarded to the town by the Enclosure Commissioners, who had enclosed Gilstead Moor in 1860. Another 8 acres (3 ha) of land had been purchased to add to the park, with most of the park being built on moorland or on the levelled site of the old Brown Hill Quarry, and it opened to the public in June 1865. The lodge at the south entrance wasn't constructed until 1886, and the water for the house was spring-fed, there being an abundance of springs within the park. The park, which is just over 0.62-mile (1 km) east of Bingley Town Centre, offers good views across the Aire Valley due to its steep topography, but on opening, some commentated on its hilly nature, later preferring the relatively level Myrtle Park in the town which opened in 1908.

Early plans forwarded not long after opening, included making good use of the natural water resources. A lake was proposed with a cascading waterfall, using the natural steep-sided park to allow water to flow downhill. Another plan was to house public baths in the park as the waters in the River Aire and the canal were not as pure as they used to be. The baths eventually opened in their own purpose-built structure in the town near to Myrtle Park in 1927. The old quarry face became the Ariana, a natural amphitheatre where musical concerts were held. It was in the Ariana that the market cross and stocks from the main road in Bingley were relocated to in 1888. The stocks and market hall structure were moved from the middle of Main Street in Bingley to the park as they were in the middle of the main thoroughfare through Bingley. Their relocation meant that the main road through the town could be widened.

In 1870, a bust of the poet John Nicholson was erected in the park by public donation, but the bust went missing, with only the stone plinth remaining. A drinking fountain, supplied by a temperance society, was installed in 1866. By the end of the 19th century, two aqueducts (Nidd and Barden) were constructed underneath the west side of the park carrying water from reservoirs in the Yorkshire Dales to Chellow Heights water treatment works.

The Friends of Prince of Wales Park formed in 2013 with the aim of returning the park to its "former glory." When it was renovated in the early part of the 21st century to celebrate its 150-year anniversary, the park covered an area of 20 acres (8.1 ha). The park has a children's play area, a picnic area, and walking routes; it was grade II listed in 2001. In 2025, Prince of Wales Park alongside others within the Bradford District, were designated as local nature reserves.
