= Myrtle Park =

Public park in West Yorkshire, England

- Myrtle Park, Bingley
- Interactive map of Myrtle Park
- Location: Bingley, West Yorkshire
- OS grid: SE106388
- Coordinates: 53.8453°N 1.8403°W
- Area: 27.5 acres (11.1 ha)
- Elevation: 75–92 metres (246–302 ft)
- Opened: June 1908
- Owner: Bradford Council
- Open: All-year round

Myrtle Park is an open space in the town of Bingley, West Yorkshire, England. The park covers an area of 27.5 acres (11.1 ha) and was previously the setting for Bingley Show between 1869 and 2019, and the Bingley Live music event between 2007 and 2018.

== History ==
The land for Myrtle Park was purchased by Bingley Urban District Council (BUDC) for £7,000, and opened as a park in June 1908. Previous to the purchase for the park, the land was an open pasture labelled on maps as Micklethwaite (Myrtle) detached pasture. The park covers an area of 27.5 acres (11.1 ha), but its elevation differs from 92 metres (302 ft) above sea level at the bandstand, to 75 metres (246 ft) at low meadow, which is adjacent to the River Aire on the western side of the park.

The crown green bowling club (the Myrtle Park Crown Green Bowls Club) formed in 1908 in Gilstead, and moved into the park in the 1970s. A bandstand was erected in 1913, and a children's paddling pool in 1936. There are many entrances and exits to the park, but the two to the west from the low meadow area are bridges across the River Aire; the southernmost was installed in 1924, and the second, a little further upstream, was installed in 1951 to celebrate the Festival of Britain.

Unlike Prince of Wales Park, Myrtle Park is not listed with Historic England, but the land is protected as a recreational open space with Bradford Council's Unitary Development Plan. There are, however, three listed structures within its environs: Myrtle Grove, which was built in 1770 and became the town hall when the park opened (grade II listed), the band stand, and the war memorial which dates from 1922. The town hall continued to be used by local council workers after BUDC became part of Bradford council in 1974. The building was vacated by the local authority in 2025. In 1951, a day nursey was built on the eastern edge of the park, but this was demolished in the early 1960s to build the headquarters of the Bradford & Bingley Building Society, which opened in 1962.

The Bingley Show was held annually in Myrtle Park since 1869 (forty years before it became a designated park). The last show was in 2019, and subsequent shows in the following two years were cancelled due to effects of COVID-19, and the show has not been held again since. Between 2007 and 2018, the park was the venue for Bingley Music Live, described as "an unlikely home for a major pop festival, but the fourth Bingley Music Live has established itself as a cheaper, more family-friendly alternative to the giant Leeds [Festival]." In 2025, it was part of the closing weekend for Bradford's City of Culture event of 2025.

Like many recreational areas, Myrtle Park has a supporters group (the Friends of Myrtle Park), who receive donations from local businesses to pay for the maintenance of the park.

== Facilities ==
- The Men's Shed, a UK-based charity that encourages people to come together to share skills and encourage participation in community events, have a building in the park. This was opened in 2023.
- In terms of recreation there are outside tennis courts, children's play areas, a flower garden, a cafe and a bowling green. There is also an enclosed area near the tea rooms with some exotic birds and rabbits.
- Fishing is available along the stretch of the River Aire to the west of the park, via the local angling club.
