= William Twiss =

British Army Royal Engineer

General William Twiss
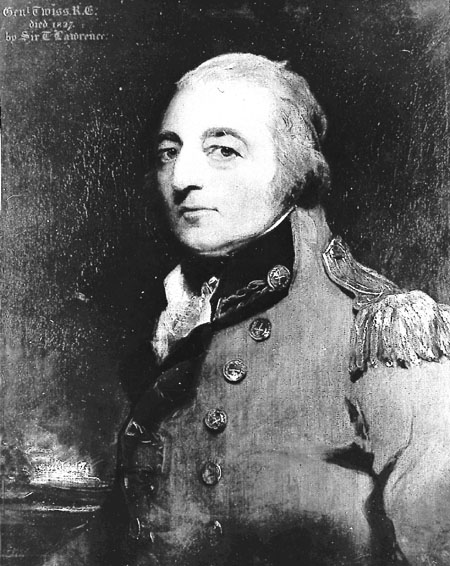
- Born: 1744; London
- Died: 14 March 1827 (aged 82–83); Bingley, Yorkshire
- Burial place: Church of All Saints, Bingley
- Alma mater: Royal Military Academy, Woolwich
- Spouse: Elizabeth Wood (m. 1775)
- Children: 1
- Military career
- Allegiance: United Kingdom
- Branch: British Army
- Service years: 1763–1810
- Rank: General
- Unit: Royal Engineers
- Conflicts: American Revolutionary War; Siege of Fort Ticonderoga; Battles of Saratoga (POW); French Revolutionary Wars; Anglo-Russian Invasion of Holland; Napoleonic Wars

General William Twiss (1744 – 14 March 1827) was a British Army Royal Engineer, responsible for the design of many military defences.

Twiss worked in the ordnance office at the Tower of London from 1760, before becoming overseer of works at Gibraltar. Receiving a commission in the army in 1763. Returning to England, he commenced work on the defences at Portsmouth Dockyard, before accompanying General Sir John Burgoyne's army to Canada in 1776, where he was responsible for a number of defensive programmes. He returned to England in 1783. Over the following years, Twiss oversaw the construction of various defences, including the chain of Martello Towers along the Kent and Sussex coastline. Twiss also accompanied the army on expeditions to the Netherlands, the Channel Islands and Ireland. In 1795 he was made governor of the Royal Military Academy, Woolwich. Twiss was promoted to Major General in 1805, and in 1809 became colonel-commandant of Royal Engineers Corps. 1825 saw him made full general.

After retiring, Twiss lived at Myrtle Grove in Bingley, West Yorkshire. He died 14 March 1827, aged 82, and is buried in the church of All Saints, Bingley.

Twiss married Elizabeth Wood (1740/41–1835), in 1775. They had one daughter, Katherine Maria (1776–1827).

He is commemorated in the naming of Twiss Road in Hythe, Kent.

== Engineering projects ==
Twiss's engineering projects include:

- Coteau-du-Lac canal, Canada
- Royal Military Canal, running from Hythe to Rye
- English South Coast Defences especially the Martello Towers, Dover Castle and the Western Heights complex in Dover, and the Shorncliffe Redoubt.
- Early 19th Century Irish defences including Bere Island, Bantry Bay and Cork Harbour
