= Percy Vear =

- Percy Vear (right)

Personal information
- Born: Hermann Vear; 12 July 1911 Crossflatts, Bingley, West Riding of Yorkshire, England
- Died: 16 March 1983 (aged 71)
- Weight: Featherweight

Boxing career
- Stance: Orthodox

Boxing record
- Total fights: 85
- Wins: 43
- Win by KO: 3
- Losses: 28
- Draws: 14
- No contests: 0

Hermann "Percy" Vear (12 July 1911 – 16 March 1983) was an English professional boxer during the 1920s and 1930s.

Brought up in Crossflatts during the First World War, Vear lived in Keighley all his adult life.

== Other sporting activities outside boxing ==
Following his boxing career, Vear was involved with his local association football club, Keighley Town.

The club was subsequently reformed in 1981 by ex-Wales and Bradford City footballer Trevor Hockey.

== Personal life ==
Vear worked as a store keeper in a Bakehouse and later in life as a shot blaster for a local firm in Keighley the "Rustless Iron Company Ltd" now known under the acronym Trico Vitreous Enamel, and moved to the nearby town of Bingley.

In 2009, Christopher Dunn (illustrator) staged an exhibition of his watercolours entitled "Bingley Secrets". One of his pieces was of boxer Vear sitting on top of Damart UK Headquarters factory chimney overlooking Bingley.

In 2012, a 'Traditional Real Ale' public house was named after Vear in his home town of Keighley in Aireworth Street in honour of his achievements. There is a Pint of real ale beer named after Vear aptly named "Percy’s Pint", which may be found and consumed on the premise. This beer is specially brewed by Empire Brewery in Huddersfield.

== Career record ==
43 Wins (3 knockouts, 38 decisions, 1 retired, 1 disqualifications), 28 Losses (1 knockouts, 23 decisions, 3 retired, 1 disqualifications), 14 Draws
Res.	Opponent	Type	Rd., Time	Date	Location, UK	Notes
Loss	(United Kingdom) Young Broadley (Bradford)	Decision	6 (6)	1929-02-11	Drill Hall, Keighley	Handbill misspelt as "Veer"
Draw	(United Kingdom) Maurice Emmott (Silsden)	x	6 (6)	1929-03-18	Drill Hall, Keighley	Handbill misspelt as "Veer"
Draw	(United Kingdom) Maurice Emmott (Silsden)	x	6 (6)	1929-04-08	Drill Hall, Keighley	Handbill misspelt as "Veer"
Draw	(United Kingdom) Dusty Young (Harrogate)	x	6 (6)	1929-08-21	In the Woodlands Hotel Gardens, Harrogate	
Draw	(United Kingdom) Young Mack (Harrogate)	x	6 (6)	1929-09-11	In the Woodlands Hotel Gardens, Harrogate	
Win	(Republic of Ireland) Mick Walsh (Harrogate)	Decision	6 (6)	1929-10-21	Starbeck Physical Culture Room, Starbeck	Handbill misspelt as "Vere"
Draw	(United Kingdom) Young Hargreaves (Dewsbury)	x	6 (6)	1929-10-27	Batley Physical Culture Club, Batley	
Draw	(United Kingdom) Young Broadley (Bradford)	x	6 (6)	1929-10-28	Drill Hall, Keighley	2nd Fight in two days
Loss	(United Kingdom) Danny Wakelam (Castleford)	Decision	8 (8)	1929-11-29	Gaiety Skating Rink, Castleford	Handbill misspelt as "Veare"
Win	(United Kingdom) Maurice Emmott (Silsden)	Decision	6 (6)	1929-12-09	Drill Hall, Keighley	
Loss	(England) Teddy Talbot (Warrington)	Stopped	8 (8)	1929-12-25	The Rink, Knaresborough	Handbill marked as A.N.Other
Loss	(United Kingdom) Danny Wakelam (Castleford)	Decision	8 (8)	1930-01-15	The Rink, Batley Carr, Dewsbury	Handbill misspelt as "Veare"
Win	(England) Tommy Boylan (Barrow)	Decision	8 (8)	1930-02-17	Drill Hall, Workington	
Win	(United Kingdom) Maurice Emmott (Silsden)	Decision	8 (8)	1930-02-24	Drill Hall, Keighley	
Win	(United Kingdom) Jack Inwood (Birstall)	Decision	8 (8)	1930-03-03	Birstall Physical Culture Club, Birstall	Handbill misspelt as "Veare"
Loss	(United Kingdom) Dod Lockland (Bradford)	Decision	8 (8)	1930-03-10	Horton Green Social Club, Bradford	Handbill misspelt as "Veare"
Loss	(Republic of Ireland) Mick Walsh (Harrogate)	Decision	8 (8)	1930-03-17	Ideal Skating Rink, Harrogate	Handbill misspelt as "Vere"
Draw	(United Kingdom) Danny Wakelam (Castleford)	x	8 (8)	1930-03-24	Drill Hall, Keighley	
Loss	(United Kingdom) Danny Wakelam (Castleford)	Decision	8 (8)	1930-04-06	Horton Green Social Club, Bradford	Handbill misspelt as "Veare"
Loss	(United Kingdom) Young Broadley (Bradford)	Decision	8 (8)	1930-04-07	Birstall Physical Culture Club, Birstall	Handbill misspelt as "Veare"
Win	(United Kingdom) John Barrett (Keighley)	Decision	8 (8)	1930-05-05	Drill Hall, Workington	
Win	(England) Jack White (Bradford)	Decision	6 (6)	1930-06-02	Drill Hall, Keighley	
Loss	(United Kingdom) Boy Gibson (Bradford)	KO	4 (8)	1930-06-30	The Black Swan, Harrogate	Vear substitute for Alfred Buck
Win	(United Kingdom) Joe Speight	KO	8 (8)	1930-07-15	Gomersal	
Win	(United Kingdom) Jack Smith (Shipley)	Decision	8 (8)	1930-09-01	Victoria Hall, Saltaire	Handbill misspelt as "Veare"
Win	(United Kingdom) Tommy Gallagher (Huddersfield)	Decision	6 (6)	1930-09-28	Vulcan Athletic Club, Dewsbury	
Loss	(United Kingdom) Freddie Irving (Keighley)	Decision	6 (6)	1930-09-29	Drill Hall, Keighley	Vear substitute for Young Haggas
Win	(United Kingdom) Young Kirkley (Leeds)	Decision	8 (8)	1930-11-10	The Baths, Normanton	
Win	(United Kingdom) Young Dudley (Wakefield)	Decision	10 (10)	1930-11-16	The Premier School of Boxing, Liversedge	
Draw	(United Kingdom) Harry Johnson (Macclesfield)	x	8 (8)	1930-11-24	Drill Hall, Keighley	
Win	(United Kingdom) Joe Speight (Birstall)	Stopped	4 (6)	1930-12-08	Drill Hall, Keighley	Vear substitute for Young Ogden
Win	(United Kingdom) Eric (Kid) Lawton (Goole)	Decision	10 (10)	1930-12-14	The Premier School of Boxing, Liversedge	
Win	(United Kingdom) Kid Close (Holbeck, Leeds)	Decision	8 (8)	1930-12-21	The Windsor Stadium, Leeds	
Win	(United Kingdom) Johnny Parker (Doncaster)	Decision	10 (10)	1931-01-18	The Premier School of Boxing, Liversedge	
Win	(United Kingdom) Jim Burrows (Barnsley)	Decision	8 (8)	1931-01-23	Drill Hall, Keighley	
Win	(Republic of Ireland) Mickey Ryan (Leeds)	Decision	10 (10)	1931-03-09	Drill Hall, Keighley	Ryan stand-in for Young Stafford
Draw	(United Kingdom) Johnny Nolan (Bradford)	x	10 (10)	1931-03-23	The New Stadium, Bradford	
Win	(United Kingdom) Kid Eccles (Leeds)	Decision	10 (10)	1931-04-06	Drill Hall, Keighley	
Win	(United Kingdom) Jackie Quinn (Bradford)	Decision	10 (10)	1931-05-04	The Windsor Stadium, Leeds	
Draw	(United Kingdom) Mick Howard (Liverpool)	x	10 (10)	1931-06-03	Wigan	controversial draw, Vear appeared to be easy Winner
Loss	(United Kingdom) Dickie Inckles (Sheffield)	Decision	12 (12)	1931-06-15	Don Road Stadium, Sheffield	
Win	(United Kingdom) Billy Sullivan (Silsden)	Decision	10 (10)	1931-07-05	The Picture House, Streethouse, Pontefract	
Win	(United Kingdom) Jacky Skelly (Barnsley)	Decision	10 (10)	1931-07-11	The Plant Hotel, Mexborough	
Win	(United Kingdom) Dickie Inckles (Sheffield)	Decision	12 (12)	1931-07-15	Don Road Stadium, Sheffield	Inckles had verdicts over Jackie Brown (British Champion) & Bert Kirby (Ex-Champion)
Loss	(United Kingdom) Jackie Webster (Normanton)	Decision	12 (12)	1931-07-29	Newhall Sports Ground, Attercliffe, Sheffield	
Win	(United Kingdom) Billy Gritt (Doncaster)	Decision	10 (10)	1931-08-01	Open-air boxing at The Plant Hotel, Mexborough	
Draw	(United Kingdom) Joe Goodall (Castleford)	x	12 (12)	1931-08-15	Newhall Sports Ground, Attercliffe, Sheffield	
Win	(United Kingdom) Steve Firman (Swinton, Mexborough)	Decision	10 (10)	1931-08-23	The Brunswick Stadium, Leeds	
Draw	(United Kingdom) Steve Firman (Swinton, Mexborough)	x	10 (10)	1931-08-28	Denaby, Doncaster	
Loss	(United Kingdom) Young Dandy (Scunthorpe)	Decision	10 (10)	1931-09-20	The Brunswick Stadium, Leeds	
Loss	(United Kingdom) George Aldred (Bolton)	Decision	10 (10)	1931-10-12	Olympia Skating Ring, Wakefield	Aldred substitute for Joe Speakman
Loss	(United Kingdom) Dyke Archer (Salford)	Decision	12 (12)	1931-10-22	Colne	
Win	(United Kingdom) Mickey Callaghan (Leeds)	Decision	10 (10)	1931-10-25	The Brunswick Stadium, Leeds	Callaghan substitute for Jacky Barber
Win	(United Kingdom) Willie Walsh (Oldham)	Decision	10 (10)	1931-11-03	British Legion Club, Huddersfield	
Loss	(United Kingdom) Seaman Dobson (Leeds)	Decision	12 (12)	1931-11-27	Imperial Boxing Hall, Barnsley	Vear Substitute for Johnny Regan
Draw	(United Kingdom) Young Creasy (Newark)	X	10 (10)	1931-12-03	Victoria Baths, Nottingham	
Loss	(United Kingdom) George Aldred (Bolton)	Decision	10 (10)	1931-12-13	The Brunswick Stadium, Leeds	Handbill misspelt as "Veir"
Win	(United Kingdom) Tiny Smith (Sheffield)	Disqualification	6 (10	1931-12-13	Rotherham	
Draw	(United Kingdom) Young Kilbride (Leeds)	X	10 (10)	1932-01-11	Drill Hall, Keighley	
Win	(United Kingdom) Bob Healey (Bolton)	Decision	10 (10)	1932-02-08	Skipton	
Win	(United Kingdom) Jackie Quinn (Bradford)	Decision	10 (10)	1932-02-15	Drill Hall, Keighley	
Win	(United Kingdom) Kid Cassidy (Stockton)	Decision	10 (10)	1932-02-21	The Brunswick Stadium, Leeds	Handbill misspelt as "Veir"
Win	(United Kingdom) Young Tucker (Nelson)	Decision	10 (10)	1932-03-21	Drill Hall, Keighley	Tucker substitute for George Taylor
Win	(United Kingdom) Tom Goodall (Castleford)	Decision	12 (12)	1932-03-29	Drill Hall, Workington	
Loss	(United Kingdom) Freddie Irving (Keighley)	Decision	10 (10)	1932-04-11	Drill Hall, Keighley	
Loss	(United Kingdom) Billy Shaw (Leeds)	Decision	10 (10)	1932-05-14	Goit Stock Pleasure Grounds, Bingley	
Loss	(United Kingdom) Tom Cowley (Thurnscoe)	Decision	12 (12)	1932-05-16	The Racing Track, Goldthorpe	
Win	(United Kingdom) Young Kennedy (Maltby)	Decision	10 (10)	1932-06-04	Drill Hall, Workington	
Loss	(United Kingdom) Billy Smith (Huddersfield)	Disqualification	5 (6)	1932-06-18	Drill Hall, Keighley	
Loss	(United Kingdom) Jackie Quinn (Bradford)	Decision	10 (10)	1932-07-01	The Plant Hotel, Mexborough	
Loss	(United Kingdom) Sid Ellis (Manchester)	Decision	10 (10)	1932-07-22	Nelson Football Ground, Nelson	
Loss	(United Kingdom) Billy Shaw (Leeds)	Decision	10 (10)	1932-08-08	Keighley RL Football Ground (Cougar Park), Keighley	Vear substitute for Freddie Irving
Loss	(United Kingdom) Billy Shaw (Leeds)	Decision	8 (8)	1932-xx-xx	Leeds	
Win	(United Kingdom) Jackie Quinn (Bradford)	Decision	10 (10)	1932-11-07	Windsor Hall, Bradford	Vear substitute for Freddy Irving
Win	(United Kingdom) Dick Greaves (Salford)	Retired	10 (12)	1932-11-10	Alexandra Stadium, Colne	
Win	(United Kingdom) Tommy Barber (Bradford)	Decision	10 (10)	1932-11-14	Olympia, Bradford	
Win	(United Kingdom) Tommy Barber (Bradford)	Decision	10 (10)	1932-11-27	Leeds National Sporting Club	
Loss	(Poland) Hyman Gordon (Manchester)	Retired hurt – burst ear	9 (10)	1932-12-01	Alexandra Stadium, Colne	
Win	(United Kingdom) Young Monk (Dinnington)	Decision	10 (10)	1933-01-16	Drill Hall, Halifax	
Win	(United Kingdom) Bobby Thackray (Leeds)	Decision	10 (10)	1933-02-06	Drill Hall, Keighley	
Win	(Scotland) Darkie Carr (Glasgow)	Decision	10 (10)	1933-02-10	Wakefield Boxing Stadium, Wakefield	
Win	(United Kingdom) Danny Wakelam (Castleford)	Decision	10 (10)	1933-02-24	The Gaiety, Castleford	
Loss	(United Kingdom) Charlie Barlow (Manchester)	Stopped by referee	1 (10)	1933-03-03	Blackpool Tower Circus, Blackpool	Barlow current contender for Lightweight Champion of Great Britain
Loss	(United Kingdom) Mattie Hinds (Durham)	Decision	12 (12)	1933-03-11	Theatre Royal, Sunderland	
Win	(United Kingdom) Jackie Webster (Normanton)	Stopped by Knockout	7 (10)	1933-03-17	Drill Hall, Normanton	
Win	(United Kingdom) Owen Moran (Leeds)	Decision	15 (15)	1933-03-22	Winter Gardens, Morecambe	
Draw	(United Kingdom) George Stead (Manchester)	x	15 (15)	1933-04-12	Winter Gardens, Morecambe	
Loss	(United Kingdom) Jack Clayton (Bradford)	Decision	10 (10)	1933-05-01	Olympia, Bradford	
Loss	(United Kingdom) Walter (Kid Chocolate) Melgram (Otley)	Stopped	x (8)	1933-05-14	Brunswick Stadium, Leeds	
Loss	(United Kingdom) Jack Clayton (Bradford)	Decision	10 (10)	1933-06-07	Goit Stock, Bingley	
Loss	(United Kingdom) Danny Veitch (Sunderland)	Decision	10 (10)	1933-06-24	West Hartlepool	
Loss	(Republic of Ireland) Spud Murphy (Manchester)	Stopped	3 (15)	1933-07-19	Winter Gardens, Morecambe	
Loss	(Scotland) Jim Driscoll (North Shields)	Stopped	7 (xx)	1933-10-20	North Shields Stadium, North Shields	
Loss	(United Kingdom) Bob Caulfield (Manchester)	Decision	10 (10)	1933-10-22	Brunswick Stadium, Leeds	
Win	(United Kingdom) Jim Holding (Leeds)	Decision	10 (10)	1933-11-03	The Picture House, Streethouse, Pontefract	
Loss	(United Kingdom) Walt Jacques (Keighley)	Decision	8 (8)	1933-11-13	Drill Hall, Keighley	Vear & Jacques replaced Williams & Lee on the boxing card
Loss	(United Kingdom) Jack Crow (Halifax)	Decision	6 (6)	1933-12-08	Drill Hall, Halifax	
Loss	(United Kingdom) Bill Lambert (Burnley)	Decision	10 (10)	1934-01-11	Imperial Ballroom, Nelson	
Loss	(United Kingdom) Young Tucker (Nelson)	Decision	10 (10)	1934-02-08	Imperial Ballroom, Nelson	
Loss	(United Kingdom) Jack Carrick (Hull)	Stopped	3 (10)	1934-02-26	Hull	
Loss	(United Kingdom) Stan Hughes (Huddersfield)	Stopped	6 (10)	1934-11-12	Drill Hall, Keighley	Vear Substitute for Jacques
