= William Stuart Mcrae Craig =

English paediatrician (1903–1975)

Professor William Stuart Mcrae Craig FRSE FRCP FRCPE

Professor of Paediatrics and Child Health, University of Leeds
- In office 1946–1968

Personal details
- Born: 19 July 1903 Bingley, West Riding of Yorkshire, England
- Died: 27 June 1975 (aged 71) Edinburgh, Scotland
- Occupation: Physician, paediatrician

William Stuart Mcrae Craig (19 July 1903 – 27 June 1975) was an English physician and medical author. He was a pioneer in the field of community and preventive paediatrics. He was author of the book Care of the Newly Born Infant.

== Life ==
He was born on 19 July 1903 the son of Catherine Jane Stuart and her husband, Dr William Craig a GP in Bingley in Yorkshire. He was educated at Bingley Grammar School and then George Watson’s College in Edinburgh. Originally intending a different career he graduated with a BSc in naval architecture in 1924 from the University of Glasgow. He work for a year or two in the Clyde shipyards, and then decided to retrain and follow in his father’s footsteps as a physician. He graduated with MB ChB from the University of Edinburgh in 1930, and MD in 1933.

His first appointment was as Assistant Paediatrician to Charles McNeil at the Royal Hospital for Sick Children, Edinburgh. Here he learnt the importance of prevention and social care in preference to future treatment. In 1936 he joined the Ministry of Health in London and in the Second World War became Medical Officer in charge of South-East Britain.

He was elected a Fellow of the Royal College of Physicians of Edinburgh in 1936. In 1937 he was elected a Fellow of the Royal Society of Edinburgh, his proposers being William Frederick Harvey, Anderson Gray McKendrick, Charles McNeil and Sydney Smith. He was elected a Fellow of the Royal College of Physicians in London in 1956.

He retired to live in Gifford, East Lothian in 1968.

He died in Edinburgh on 27 June 1975.

== Family ==
He married Beatrice Anne Hodgson, daughter of Thomas George Hodgson, in 1936. They had no children.

== Publications ==
- Child and Adolescent Life in Health and Disease (1946)
- Care of the Newly Born Infant (1955) plus five later editions.
- John Thomson, Pioneer and Father of Scottish Paediatrics (1968)
- The History of the Royal College of Physicians of Edinburgh (1974)
