= Myrtle Grove, Bingley =

Municipal building in Bingley, West Yorkshire, England

Myrtle Grove
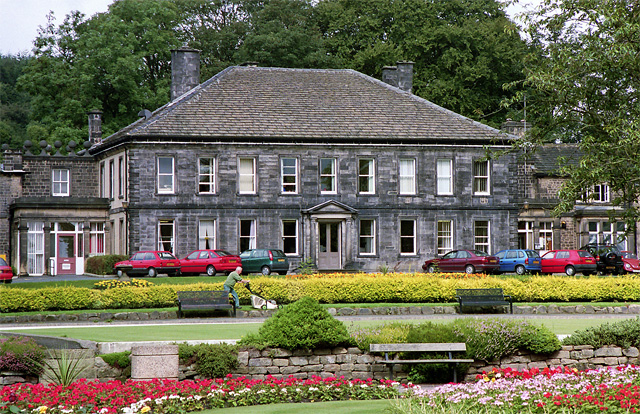
- Myrtle Grove

- Shown in West Yorkshire
- 53.8467°N 1.8403°W
- Location: Myrtle Park, Bingley

History
- Built: c.1770

Site notes
- Architectural style: Georgian style

Listed Building – Grade II
- Official name: Myrtle Grove (Town Hall)
- Designated: 9 August 1966
- Reference no.: 1314271

Myrtle Grove, also known since 1926 as Bingley Town Hall, is a municipal building in Myrtle Park, Bingley, West Yorkshire, England. The building, which was the headquarters of Bingley Urban District Council, is a Grade II listed building.

== History ==
The Myrtle Grove estate dates back to the mid-18th century when it consisted of a house known as "Spring Head", a farm and an old Quaker meeting-house. In 1767, Dr Johnson Atkinson purchased the estate, demolished the existing buildings and commissioned the current mansion which was designed in the Georgian style, built in ashlar stone and completed in around 1770. The design involved a symmetrical main frontage with nine bays facing Myrtle Park; the central bay featured a doorway flanked by Doric order pilasters supporting an entablature and a pediment. There were sash windows in the other bays on the ground floor and in the bays on the first floor. The building, which also featured rusticated quoins and a high hip roof finished in Westmorland slate, was flanked by a stable block and by a coach house.

Atkinson was one of the promotors of the Bradford Canal. He took on the name Johnson Atkinson Busfeild after receiving an inheritance from his wife's uncle, Thomas Busfeild, in 1772. The theologian, John Wesley, stayed at the house with him in April 1779 and referred to it as a "little paradise". The house was acquired by a Mr Birch in 1805 and then by General William Twiss in 1810. Twiss's son-in-law, Walker Ferrand, inherited the house in 1827. Following Ferrand's death, the house was put up for sale again and was acquired by a local mill-owner, Alfred Sharp, in 1874. Sharp was one of the town commissioners and having already been instrumental in founding the mechanics institute in York Street, he initiated a proposal on behalf of the town commissioners, in 1890, to take a lease on the mechanics institute, to establish a public library there and to convert the old reading room into a board room.

After significant population growth, largely associated with the worsted yarn industry, the area became an urban district with the old mechanics institute as its town hall in 1895. After Sharp died in 1896, his wife lived at Myrtle Grove for a while, but in 1908, the new council decided to acquire the whole Myrtle Park estate for the town. The council progressively moved its staff into Myrtle Grove between 1923 and 1926, at which point the house became Bingley Town Hall. A council chamber, which was wood panelled, was installed in the building at that time.

Myrtle Grove continued to serve as the headquarters of Bingley Urban District Council for much of the 20th century but ceased to be the local seat of government after the enlarged Bradford Council was formed in 1974. It was subsequently used as offices for the delivery of local services by Bradford Council.

== See also ==
- Listed buildings in Bingley
