= Soulanges Canal =

Abandoned shipping canal in Quebec, Canada

Coordinates: 45°19′51″N 73°58′09″W

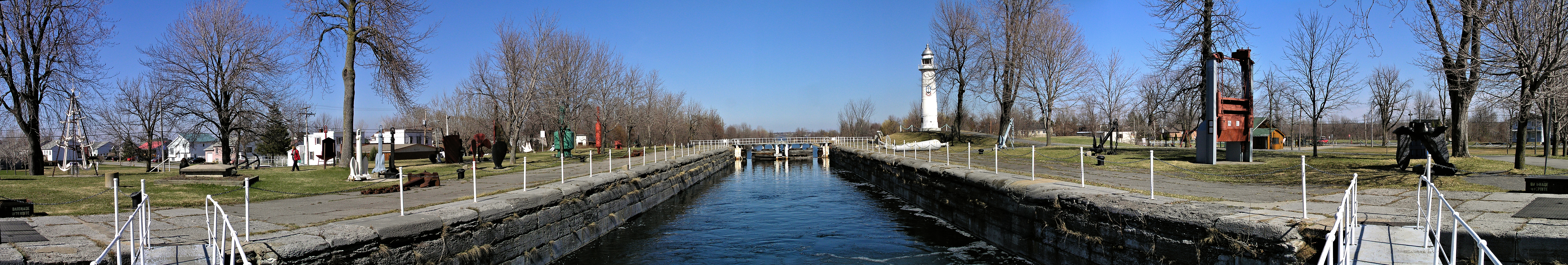
- Interactive map of Soulanges Canal
- Location: Quebec
- Country: Canada

Specifications
- Length: 23 km (14 miles)
- Lock length: 85.3 m (280 ft)
- Lock width: 14 m (46 ft)
- Maximum boat draft: 4.3 m (14 ft)
- Locks: 5
- Total rise: 23 m (75 ft)
- Status: Abandoned

History
- Date completed: 1899
- Date closed: 1958

The Soulanges Canal is an abandoned shipping canal in Quebec, Canada. It follows the north shore of the Saint Lawrence River between Pointe-des-Cascades and Coteaux-Landing, bypassing the rapids between Lake Saint-Louis and Lake Saint-Francis. In between, it passes through the towns of Les Cèdres and Coteau-du-Lac. It superseded the first Beauharnois Canal which was on the south shore of the Saint Lawrence. It is 23 kilometres (14 mi) long and had a 4.3-metre (14.1 ft) draught. Five locks measuring 85.3 m × 14 m (279.9 ft × 45.9 ft) give a total rise of 25 metres (82 ft).

== History ==
The Soulanges Canal was named after the Soulanges Seigneury which was granted in 1702 by Governor Louis-Hector de Callière to Pierre-Jacques de Joybert, Knight and Lord of Soulanges.

Operation of the Soulanges Canal was powered by a small hydro electric generating station. "Le Petit Pouvoir" is located near the middle of the canal and provided power for the motorized lock gates, electrical operation of the swing bridges, and illumination for the entire length of the canal at night. It was the first canal in the world to have its entire passageway lit by night, allowing round-the-clock operation. It opened in 1899 and remained in operation until 1958 when it was in turn superseded by an enlarged Beauharnois Canal which is now part of the Saint Lawrence Seaway.

Today, a popular cycling path follows the route of the canal. In the past there have been plans to reopen the canal to pleasure boats, but these have not materialized.

== Gallery ==
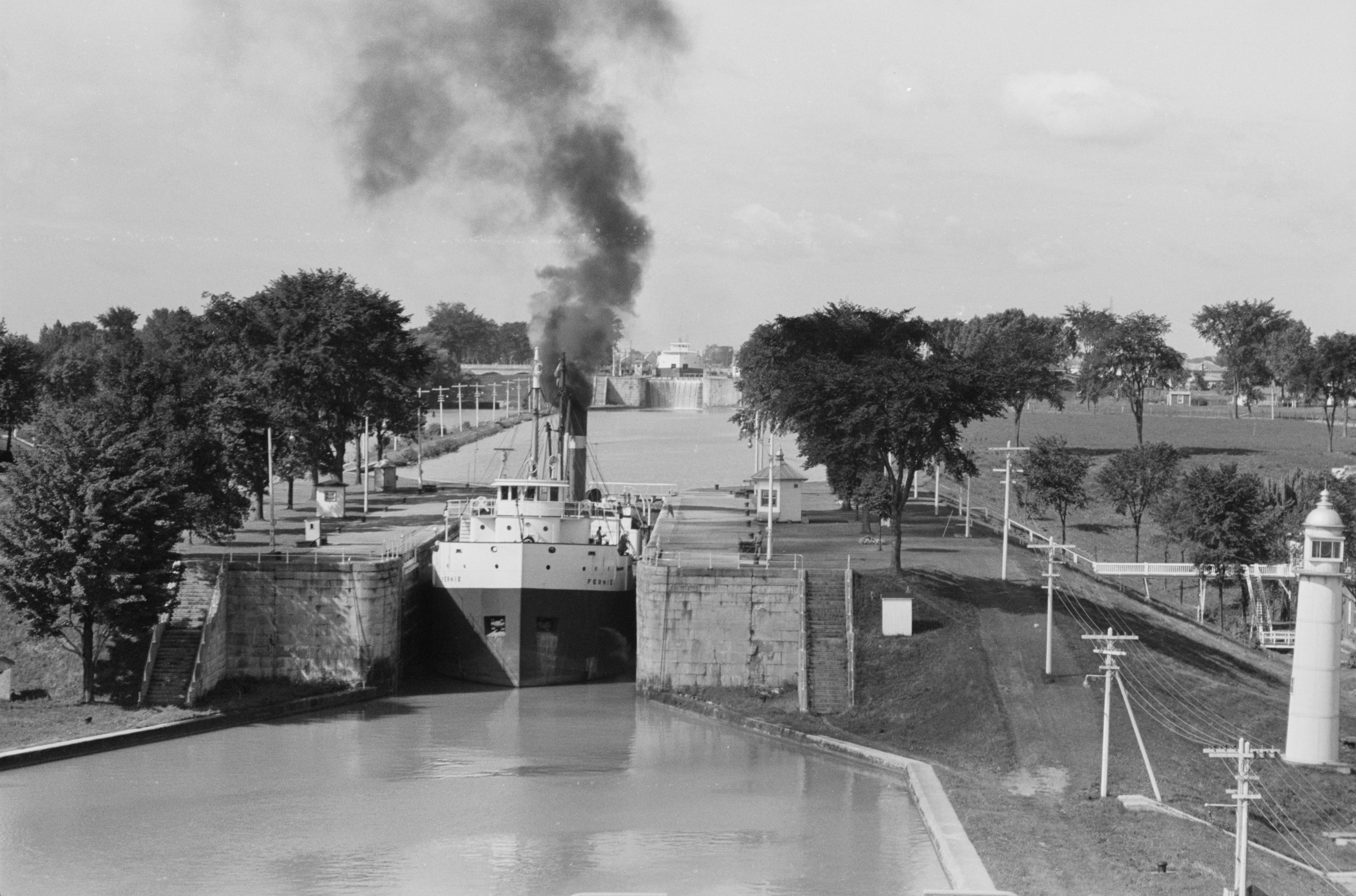
Ship passing through a lock on the canal in 1958

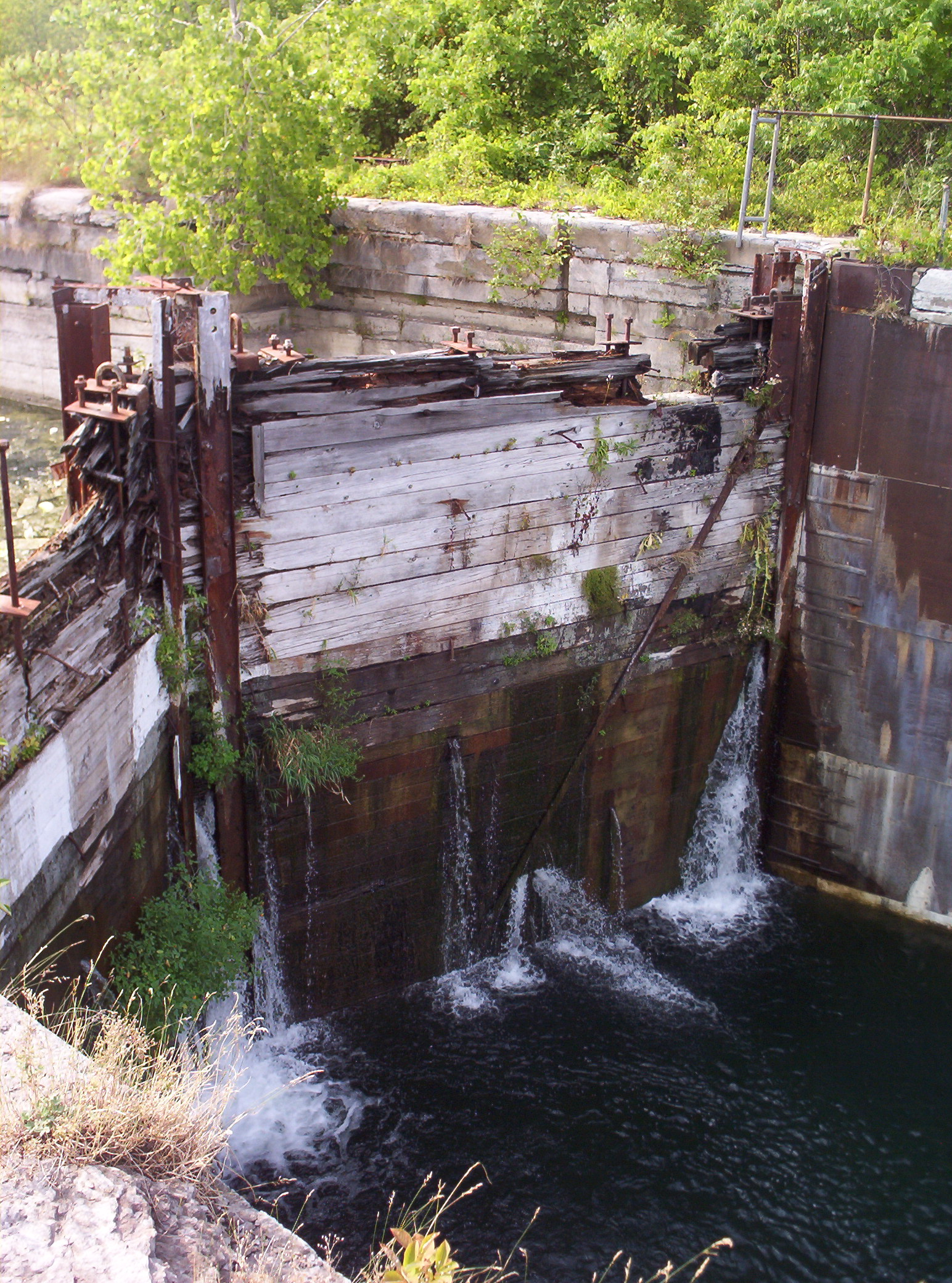
A derelict lock

== See also ==
- Coteau-du-Lac canal
- Lachine Canal
- Sainte-Anne-de-Bellevue Canal
