= Coteau-du-Lac canal =

18th-century military canal in Canada

Coteau-du-Lac
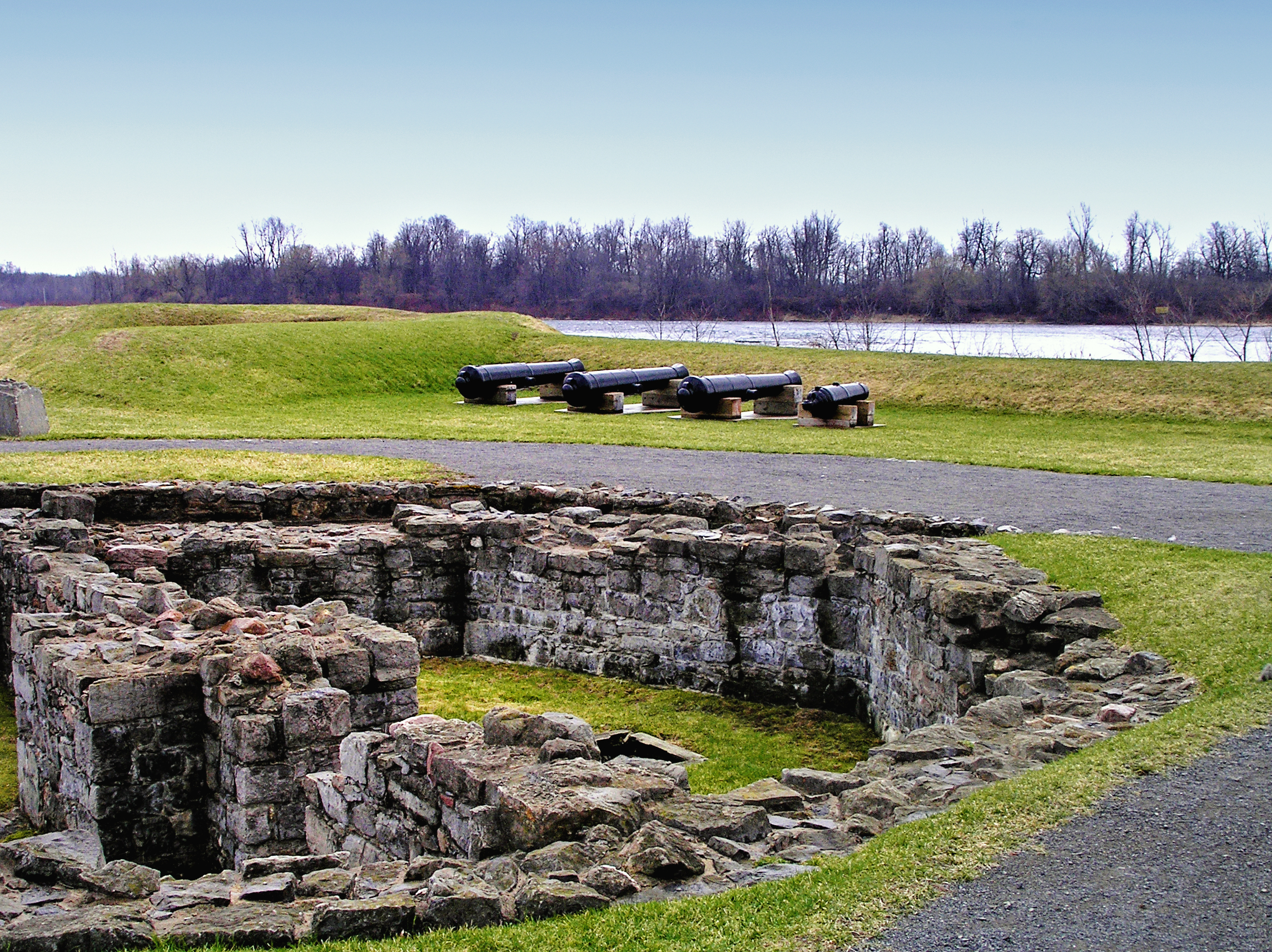
- Remains of military fortifications with the waterway in the distance
- Interactive map of Coteau-du-Lac
- 45°17′16″N 74°10′37″W

History
- Built: 1779-81

Site notes
- Governing body: Parks Canada

National Historic Site of Canada
- Official name: Coteau-du-Lac National Historic Site of Canada
- Designated: 1923

Coteau-du-Lac Canal is an 18th-century military canal in Canada located at the junction of the Delisle and Saint Lawrence Rivers in Quebec. The canal was the first work of its kind in North America, and is a National Historic Site of Canada, which also includes the remains of a fort and reconstructed blockhouse. It is located in the town of Coteau-du-Lac in Vaudreuil-Soulanges Regional County Municipality.

== History ==
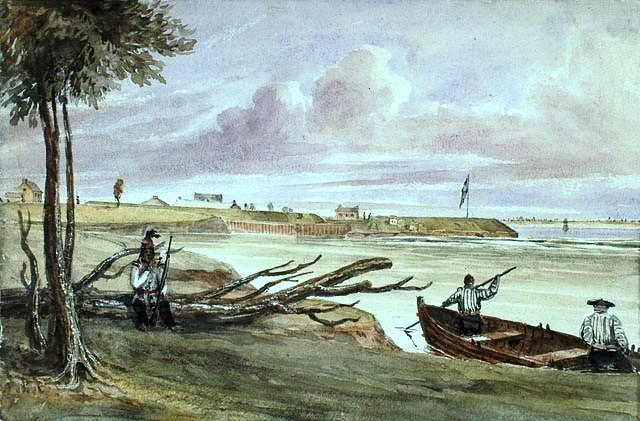
Rapid and Fort in 1840

The American War of Independence (1775–1783) revealed a number of serious flaws in the British defence system. The western frontier of the Canadian colony was protected by the military outposts on the Great Lakes. However, these outposts were all the more vulnerable for being difficult to reach. Troop and merchandise transport via the Saint Lawrence River was seriously slowed by the rapids located upstream from Montreal. In particular, the rapids at Coteau-du-Lac were the most difficult to get past and skirting the rapids by going inland prolonged supply times. To accelerate shipment of military supplies westward, Governor Frederick Haldimand ordered for a canal to be dug at Coteau-du-Lac.

The construction of the canal at Coteau-du-Lac began in 1779 under the control of Captain William Twiss. The King's Royal Regiment of New York were mobilised to dig the canal.

When construction was completed On February 15, 1781, the lock system was approximately 100 metres (330 ft) long and 2.5 metres (8 ft 2 in) wide. Each of the three locks was 12 metres (39 ft) long and 1.8 metres (5 ft 11 in) wide, with a depth measuring 76 centimetres (30 in). Taken together, these locks compensated for a drop of about 2 metres (6 ft 7 in) between the head and the foot of the rapids. It was superseded by the original Beauharnois Canal.

Today, water no longer flows around the site or through the canal owing to a drop in water levels due to the building of hydroelectric dams, the building of newer dams, and other modern development.

== Legacy ==
On 28 June 1985 Canada Post issued 'Fort at Coteau-du-Lac' one of the 20 stamps in the "Forts Across Canada Series" (1983). The stamps are perforated 12 1/2 x 13 mm and were printed by Ashton-Potter Limited based on the designs by Rolf P. Harder.

== See also ==
- Soulanges Canal - parallel canal built in 1899 to bypass the same rapids
