= Church of All Saints, Bingley =

Anglican church in West Yorkshire, England

Coordinates: 53.8514°N 1.8413°W

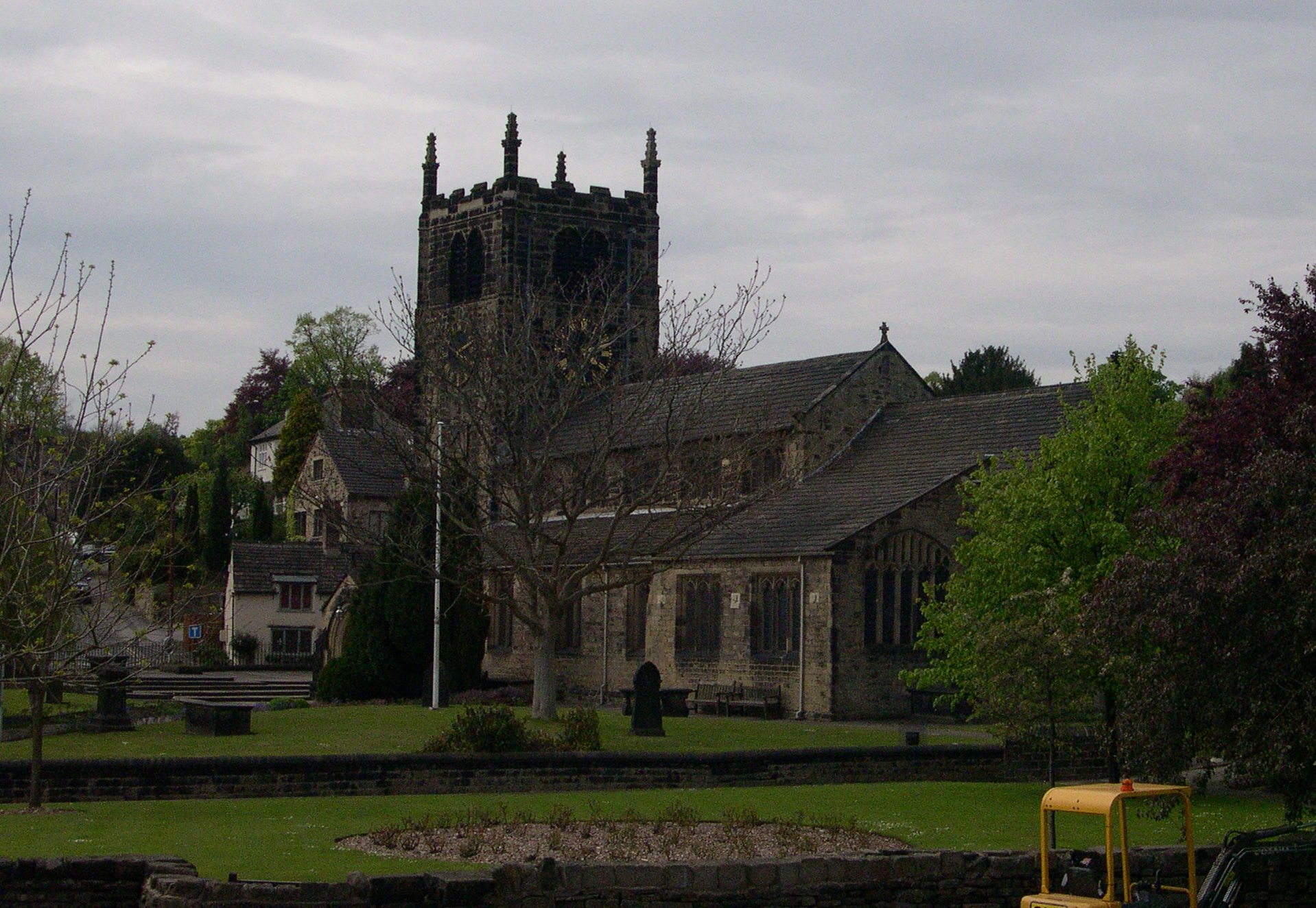
- Church of All Saints, Bingley
- Church of All Saints, Bingley
- OS grid reference: SE 10539 39474
- Country: England
- Denomination: Church of England
- Churchmanship: Central
- Website: Official website

History
- Status: Parish Church

Architecture
- Functional status: Active
- Heritage designation: Grade II*
- Designated: 9 August 1966

Administration
- Diocese: Leeds
- Archdeaconry: Bradford
- Deanery: Airedale
- Parish: All Saints Bingley

Church of All Saints is the Anglican parish church in the town of Bingley, West Yorkshire, England. It is one of two Anglican churches in the town, the other being Holy Trinity. All Saints has existed since Norman times and it is set in the oldest part of the town, near to where the River Aire is crossed by Ireland Bridge.

== History ==
The history of the church probably dates back to pre-Norman times. It is thought that there might have been a wooden church on this location for many years prior to the Norman Conquest, although no records exist. The first records of the church indicate it was rebuilt some time after 1066 by the Lord of the manor, William Paganel, who gave it, with other possessions of his, to Drax Priory in the time of Archbishop Thurstan (1119–1140).

This building was probably rebuilt many times over the centuries, culminating in the present structure, which was begun during the reign of Henry VIII (1491–1547). The choir was erected in 1518, when the church was dedicated to All Saints, having previously been dedicated to Saint Lawrence. The current tower was constructed in the 15th century and heightened with a new belfry added in 1739. The two-light bell openings that adorn each side of the tower were 19th century additions.

The church received a new clock in 1856 and was renovated in 1870–1871 when the Ferrand Chapel became the vestry and some of the pews that were tied to the local Manor Houses were stripped out.

The church has a stained-glass window crafted by William Morris and Edward Burne-Jones. There is a peal of bells, for many years six in number, with a further two added in 1873. In 1904, a new road was built to the east of the church and cut the churchyard in two. Several gravestones were used to make paths from the exhumed graves. One gravestone that was lost was that of John Nicholson, a poet who had been buried in the churchyard in April 1843.

The church was Grade II* listed in 1966. The two gate piers to the south of the church that lead onto the Old Main Street in Bingley, were grade II listed in 1985. The church's setting is in the oldest part of the town that used to have a school and possibly a castle. The Old White Horse Inn and Ireland Bridge are both nearby, and the Old Main Street is still laid out with cobbled stone setts.

The parish includes the churches of St. Aidan, Crossflatts and St. Lawrence, Eldwick and is part of the Bingley Group Ministry which includes Holy Trinity Church and St Wilfreds in Gilstead. The benefice used to lie within the Diocese of Bradford, but since 20 April 2014 it is now in the Diocese of Leeds.

In October 2018, a special service with the Bishop of Leeds, Nick Baines, was held to celebrate 500 years anniversary of worship at the church.

== See also ==
- Grade II* listed buildings in Bradford
- Listed buildings in Bingley
