= Damart =

French clothing company

Damartex
- Company type: Public
- Industry: Mail Order, Retail
- Founded: 1953
- Key people: Paul Georges Despature, Board Chairman
- Website: http://www.damart.com

Damart is a French company which specialises in clothing. Established in 1953 the brand became a household name in France and the UK. Although the brand specialises in a material called Thermolactyl, known for its insulation qualities, the label has expanded to include fashion items for the seniors market.

== Damart brand ==
Damart is the best known brand of a company, now called Damartex, which originated in France in 1953. It was founded by the Despature brothers and primarily manufactured thermal clothing using Thermolactyl fibre. Today the Damartex group employs around 4,000 people worldwide, with around 650 of these in the UK. In 1976, Damart went public being listed on the Paris Stock Exchange. In 2003 Damart celebrated its 50th anniversary, with 130 stores across Europe and an active customer base of 10 million.

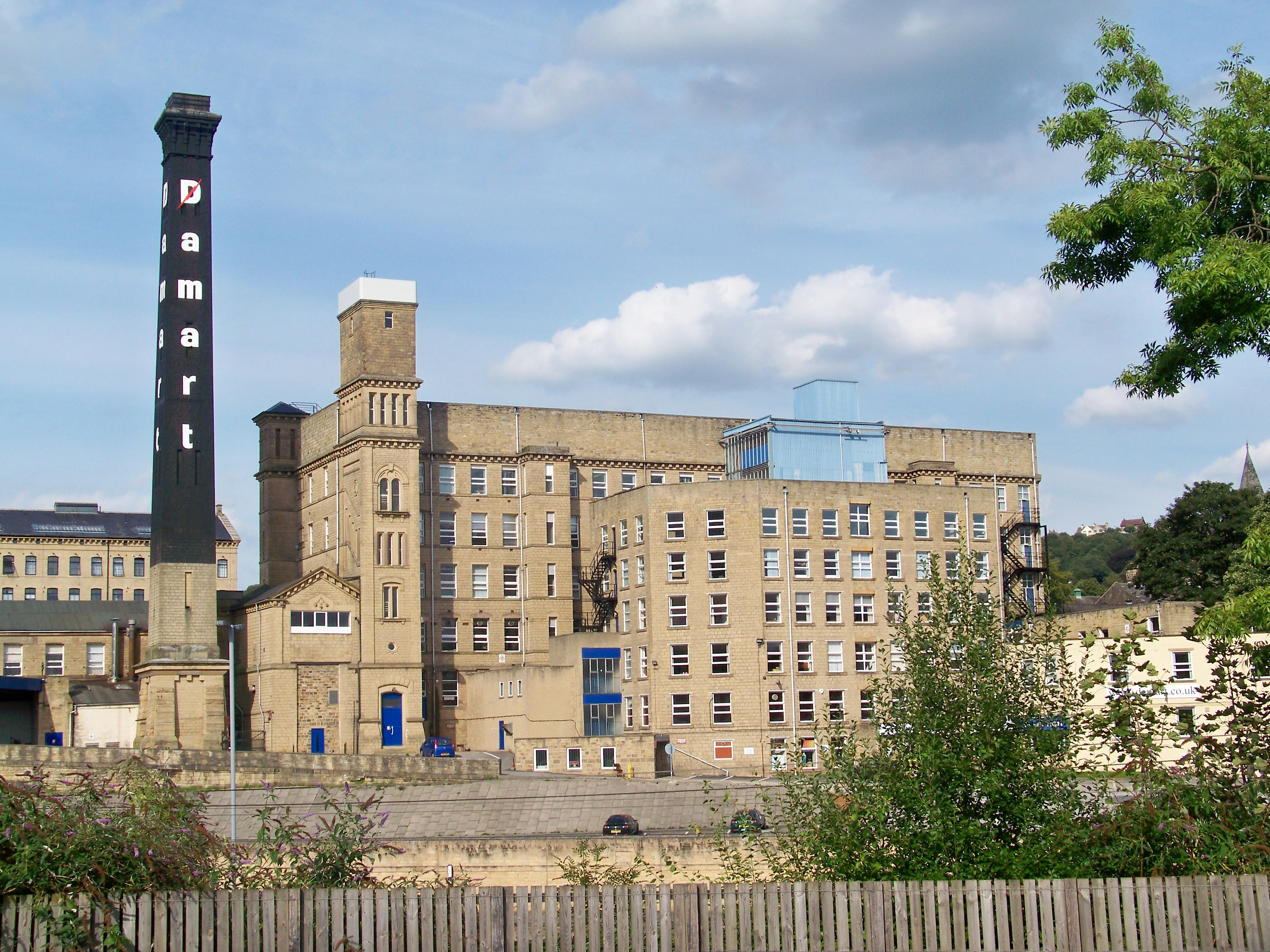
Damart buildings, Bingley, UK

== In the UK ==
In the UK, Damart has two offices. These are located in West Yorkshire, one in Bingley (HQ), and one in Steeton (warehouse). There was previously a location in Earby (mailings distribution centre), but this shut in 2009 and all mailings are now done from Steeton.

Damart has closed its physical UK retail stores, with the exception of one in Bingley, and now operates as a mail order, telephone order and online retailer.

=== Controversy ===
In 2005 Damart upset elderly customers by sending them a promotional offer disguised as a red final reminder letter. The letter was entitled 'Final reminder from Damart's financial director' and had 'Account Settlement' pasted across the page.

== Worldwide ==
Damartex headquarters is in France. The company also has a presence in the USA, Japan, Australia, Belgium and Switzerland.
