= Bingley =

Town in West Yorkshire, England

Coordinates: 53.846°N 1.836°W

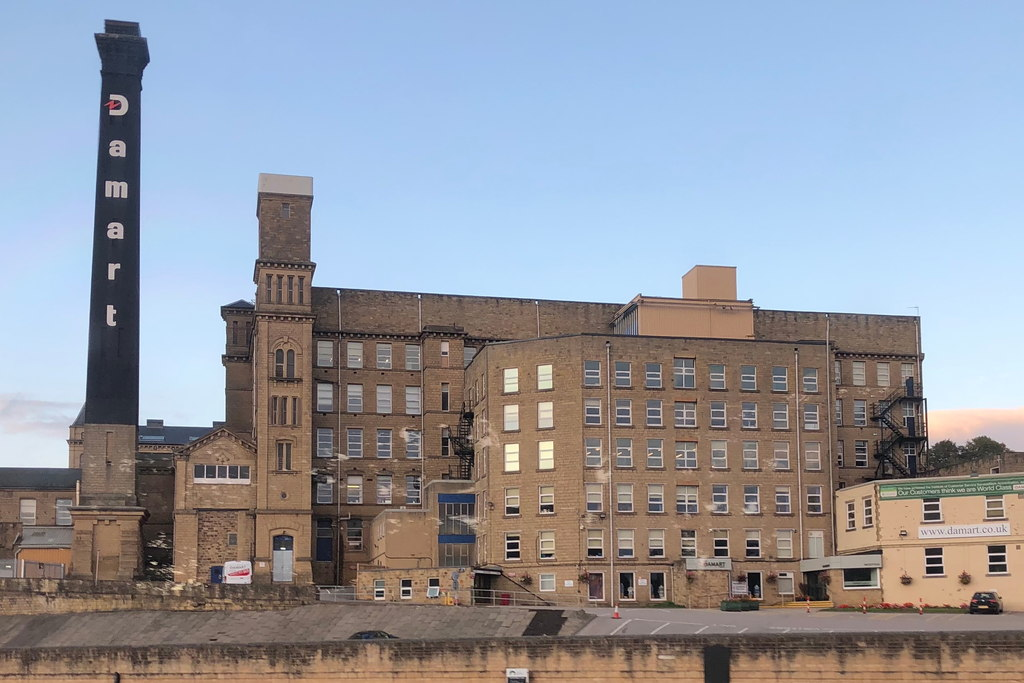
- Damart Mills, Bingley

- Location within West Yorkshire
- Population: 18,040 (Ward, 2021 census)
- OS grid reference: SE108389
  - London: 210 miles (338 km)
- Civil parish: Bingley
- Metropolitan borough: City of Bradford
- Metropolitan county: West Yorkshire
- Region: Yorkshire and the Humber
- Country: England
- Sovereign state: United Kingdom
- Post town: BINGLEY
- Postcode district: BD16
- Dialling code: 01274
- Police: West Yorkshire
- Fire: West Yorkshire
- Ambulance: Yorkshire
- UK Parliament: Shipley
- Councillors: Marcus Dearden (independent); Joe Wheatley (independent); Susan Fricker (Labour)

Bingley is a market town and civil parish in the metropolitan borough of the City of Bradford, West Yorkshire, England. It is sited on the River Aire and the Leeds and Liverpool Canal. The town had a population of 18,040 at the 2021 Census.

== History ==
In 1775, a farmer near Bingley discovered a chest of silver coins on his land, of which some dated to the rule of Julius Caesar.

=== Founding ===
Bingley was likely founded by the Saxons, by a ford on the River Aire. This crossing gave access to Harden, Cullingworth and Wilsden on the southern side of the river.

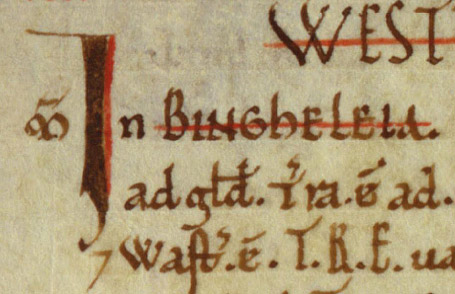
Bingley's entry in the Domesday Book, 1086AD

The origins of the name are from the Old English personal name Bynna + ingas ("descendants of") + lēah ("clearing in a forest"). Altogether, this would mean the "wood or clearing of the Bynningas, the people called after Bynna".

=== Normans ===
In the Domesday Book of 1086, Bingley is listed as "Bingheleia":

m In Bingheleia hb. Gospatric iiij car' tra e' ad gld. tra ad ii car' Ernegis de burun h't. & Wast' e'. T.R.E. val, iiij lib'. Silva past' ii leu' lg' & i lat'. Tot' m' e iiij leu' lg' & ii lat'

which roughly translated reads:

In Bingheleia, Gospatric has a manor of four carucate of land to be taxed, land for two ploughs. Ernegis de Burun has it and it is waste. In the time of King Edward the Confessor it was valued at four pounds. Woodland pasture two leagues long and one broad. All the manor is four long and two broad.

=== Medieval ===
The ford was superseded by Ireland Bridge. Bingley was a manor which extended several miles up and down the Aire valley, extending upstream to Marley on the outskirts of Keighley and downstream to Cottingley. Bingley became a market town with the grant of a Market Charter in 1212 by King John.

According to the poll tax returns of 1379, Bingley had 130 households, and probably around 500 people. The nearby towns of Bradford, Leeds and Halifax had about half this population. Therefore, at this time Bingley was the largest town in the area.

No records tell of how Bingley fared in the Black Death that swept Europe in the 14th century. Approximately one third of all the people in Europe died of this plague, sometimes wiping out whole towns and villages. According to the 1379 Poll tax records, the nearby town of Boulton had no survivors worth taxing.

=== Tudor period ===
In 1592, Bingley was shown on a map by Yorkshire map-maker Christopher Saxton as a single street with about 20 houses on each side. The church sits at the west end of the street opposite a single large house, possibly a manor house. Since Bingley was a market town, the market stalls would have been set up on either side of the main street. One of the oldest buildings in Bingley is a coaching inn, the Old White Horse Inn, on the flatter north bank of the River Aire by Ireland Bridge.

=== Industrial Revolution ===
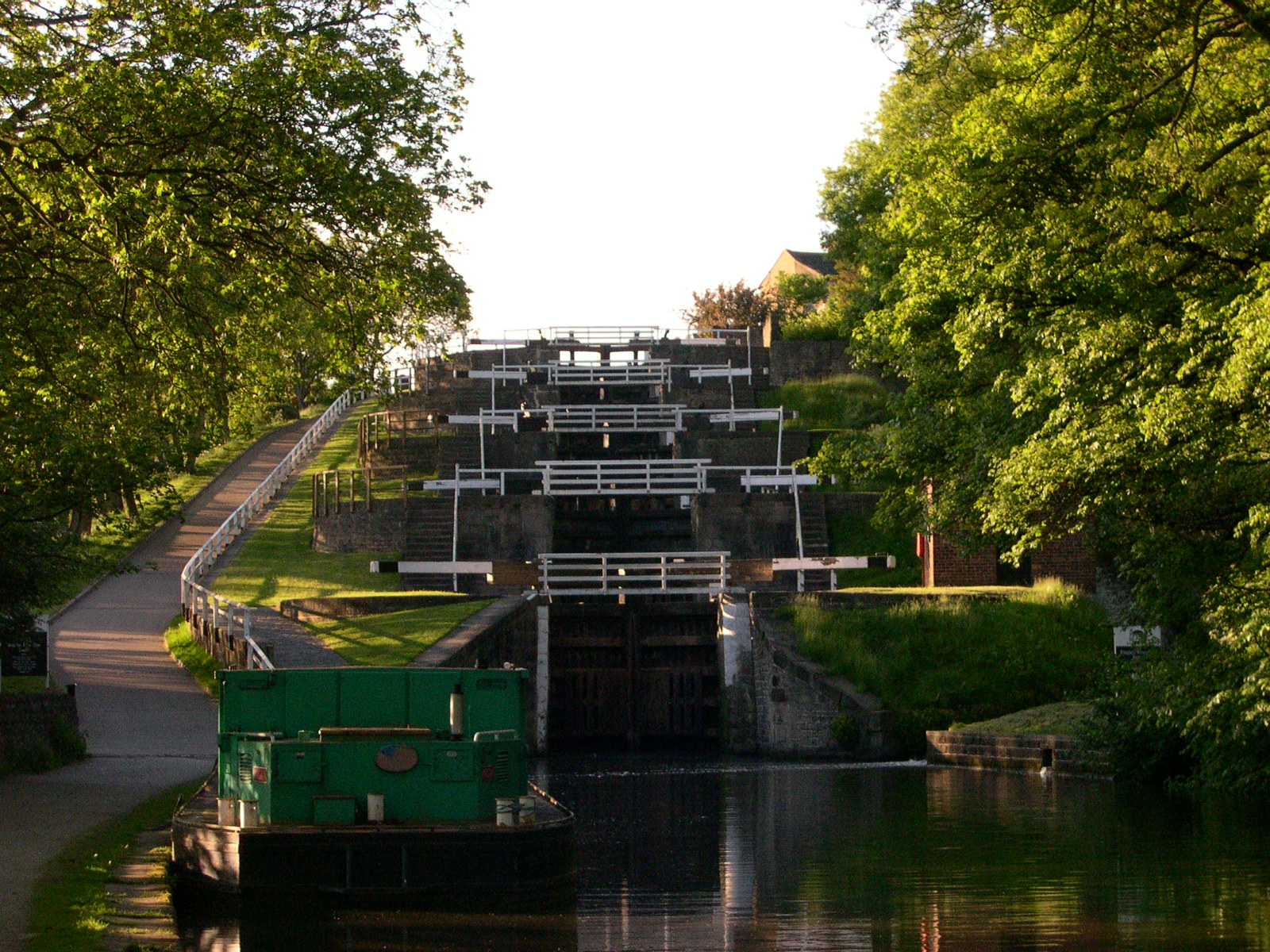
Bingley Five Rise Locks.

Like many towns in the West Riding, Bingley prospered during the Industrial Revolution. The Bingley section of the Leeds and Liverpool Canal was completed in 1774, linking the town with Skipton, and Bradford via the Bradford Canal. The canal passes through the town centre and ascends the side of the valley via the Bingley Five Rise and Bingley Three Rise Locks. Several woollen and worsted mills were built and people migrated from the surrounding countryside to work in them. Many came from further afield such as Ireland in the wake of the Great Famine. A railway and line goods yard were constructed bringing further trade. The villages of Gilstead and Eldwick became conurbated with Bingley. The Bingley Building Society was also founded in this period.

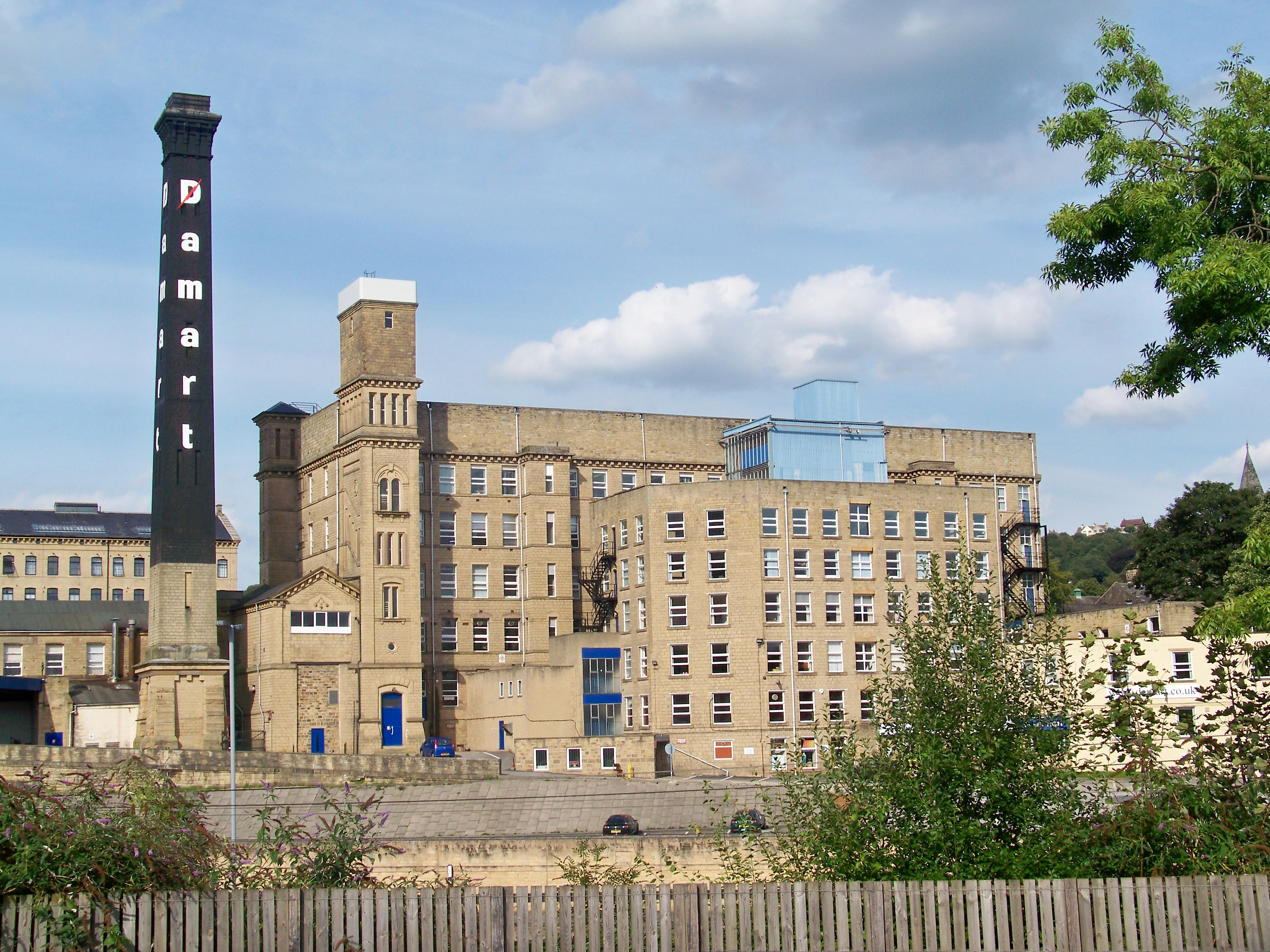
Damart buildings

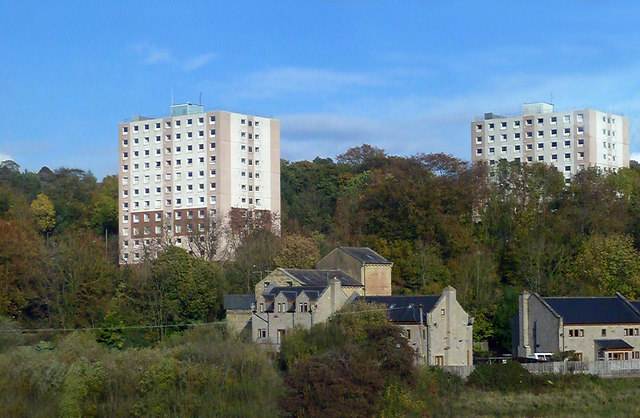
Crosley Wood high-rise flats; demolished in 2020

=== Post-industrial ===
Bingley Teacher Training College opened in 1911 with Helen Wodehouse as principal. The first intake of students was 102 women from in and around the then West Riding of Yorkshire. Before its closure in 1979, the college produced approximately 16,000 teachers.

The Beeching Axe demolished the goods yard, although the station still has trains to Leeds, Bradford, Skipton, Morecambe and Carlisle. The textile mills have largely been closed. The Damart mill still stands and trades in textiles. Since 1995 the tannery, Bingley Mill & Andertons, have been converted into flats. The most cramped and outdated terraced housing was partly replaced with council housing, Bingley Arts Centre and the headquarters of the Bradford & Bingley Building Society. Further council housing was built up the hill towards Gilstead including three tower blocks, which were later demolished in 2020. In the wake of Margaret Thatcher's reforms of council housing much of the council estate was sold and a substantial portion has been knocked down and rebuilt as private housing. The Bingley Permanent Building Society merged with the Bradford Equitable Building Society to form the Bradford & Bingley Building Society in 1964. It was decided to site the corporate headquarters in Bingley. This brought several thousand jobs to the town, but the building itself did not meet with universal acclaim and was demolished in 2015. The Bradford and Bingley collapsed in the 2008 credit crunch.

=== Criminal ===
Bingley's most infamous son is Peter Sutcliffe, the Yorkshire Ripper, who was convicted of the murders of 13 women and the attempted murder of seven others.

Mark Rowntree, a spree killer, started his murderous campaign in Bingley before moving on to Eastburn and Leeds. He was convicted in 1976 of four murders.

In 1966, bookie Fred Craven was brutally murdered in his betting shop on Wellington Street, Bingley. Craven, who was well known in the area because of his short stature (he was 4 ft 7in tall), had gone into his shop to collect papers despite there being no racing that day. It is believed that he had £200 in his wallet (£3,200.00 in 2015 prices) which went missing. Mr Craven suffered extensive injuries at the hands of the killer. Because the local constabulary had a very narrow time frame for the murder, and the fact the killer must have been covered in blood, they anticipated a quick arrest. The Craven murder remains unsolved, but rumours that Peter Sutcliffe, the Yorkshire Ripper, was responsible for his murder resurfaced in 2017. ITV Calendar News asked Sutcliffe about Craven's death and also that of a taxi driver on Bingley Moor. In what was described as a "bizarre letter", Sutcliffe responded that he was not responsible for either crime to presenter Christine Talbot.

== Road history ==
The main road through Bingley has been re-sited twice in its history. In 1904, a new cut of the road heading north west out of the town created a mini-bypass between All Saints Parish Church and the Railway. The cobbled road around the front of the church became Old Main Street. A huge section of the graveyard was taken out to lay the new road and the gravestones were used as flags on the paths around the church. A small section of the graveyard still exists on the east side of the new road bounded by the old path to Treacle Cock Alley and the railway.

Plans had been on the table for a trunk road through Bingley and the Aire valley since at least 1970. In 1992 preparatory work was undertaken to lengthen Park Road bridge so that the Leeds Liverpool Canal could be moved slightly to the east. This work would allow the formation of the new road to be sandwiched between the railway and the canal. In 1998, the Government, gave the go ahead for the trunk road to be constructed.

=== Post-relief road Bingley ===
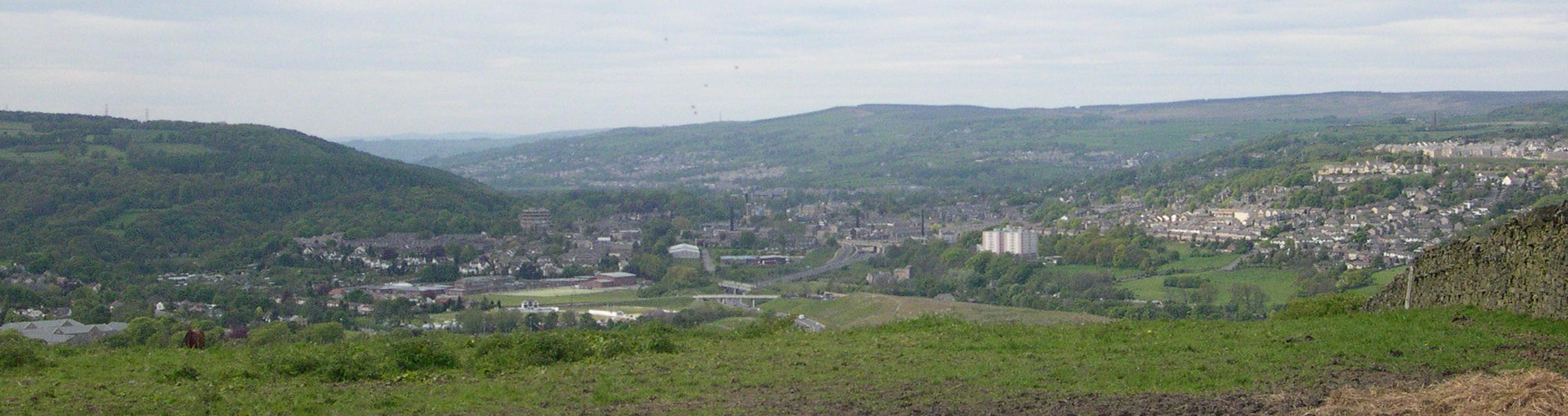
Panoramic view over Bingley

In 2004, the Bingley Relief Road opened. The £47.9 million road stretches from Crossflatts to Cottingley, threading through Bingley between the railway and the canal. One of the most expensive parts of the construction was moving a 160-yard (150 m) stretch of the canal. The construction involved the removal of Treacle Cock Alley pedestrian tunnel and the Tin Bridge, which have been replaced by the Three Rise Bridge, and the Britannia Bridge

In 2004, the average home price in Bingley rose 30% to £196,850 – the second fastest appreciating area in the UK (after the nearby Hebden Bridge).

The road was a target of road protest camp where protesters occupied tree houses for nearly two years.

== Governance ==
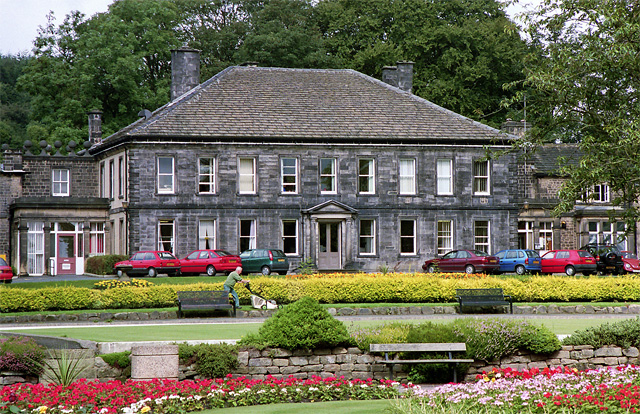
Myrtle Grove, which became the council headquarters in 1926

Bingley was part of the Wapentake of Skyrack, which was in turn part of the West Riding of Yorkshire. The ancient parish of Bingley included the chapelry of Morton and several other hamlets, including Cullingworth. In 1866, the parish was divided into the new civil parishes of Bingley and Morton. In 1898, Bingley Urban District was formed; by 1926, all council administration had been transferred to Myrtle Grove which became the town hall. In 1974 the urban district and civil parish were abolished and absorbed into the City of Bradford Metropolitan District in the new county of West Yorkshire. Bingley became a ward in the Bradford metropolitan district. A civil parish called Bingley Town Council was established on 1 April 2016 following a petition to Bradford Council in October 2015. This followed a two-year campaign by the Bingley Community Council Group. Elections were held in May 2016 for the first councillors for the new Bingley Town Council. It has 16 councillors representing eight wards: Bingley Central, Crossflatts, Lady Lane and Oakwood, Eldwick, Gilstead, Priestthorpe, Crownest and Cottingley.

=== Councillors ===
Bingley ward is represented on Bradford Council by three Labour party councillors; Susan Fricker, Marcus Dearden, and Joe Wheatley.

Election	Councillor	Councillor	Councillor
2004	David Heseltine (Con)	Robin Owens (Con)	Colin Gill (Con)
2006	David Heseltine (Con)	Robin Owens (Con)	Colin Gill (Con)
2007	David Heseltine (Con)	Robin Owens (Con)	Colin Gill (Con)
2008	David Heseltine (Con)	Robin Owens (Con)	Colin Gill (Con)
By-election; 4 December 2008	David Heseltine (Con)	Robin Owens (Con)	John Pennington (Con)
2010	David Heseltine (Con)	Robin Owens (Con)	John Pennington (Con)
2011	David Heseltine (Con)	Mark Shaw (Con)	John Pennington (Con)
2012	David Heseltine (Con)	Mark Shaw (Con)	John Pennington (Con)
2014	David Heseltine (Con)	Mark Shaw (Con)	John Pennington (Con)
2015	David Heseltine (Con)	Mark Shaw (Con)	John Pennington (Con)
2016	David Heseltine (Con)	Mark Shaw (Con)	John Pennington (Con)
2018	David Heseltine (Con)	Mark Shaw (Con)	John Pennington (Con)
2019	David Heseltine (Con)	Geoff Winnard (Con)	John Pennington (Con)
2021	David Heseltine (Con)	Geoff Winnard (Con)	Marcus Dearden (Lab)
2022	Joe Wheatley (Lab)	Geoff Winnard (Con)	Marcus Dearden (Lab)
2023	Joe Wheatley (Lab)	Susan Katherine Fricker (Lab)	Marcus Dearden (Lab)
2024	Joe Wheatley (Lab)	Susan Katherine Fricker (Lab)	Marcus Dearden (Lab)

indicates seat up for re-election. indicates seat won in by-election.

== Transport ==
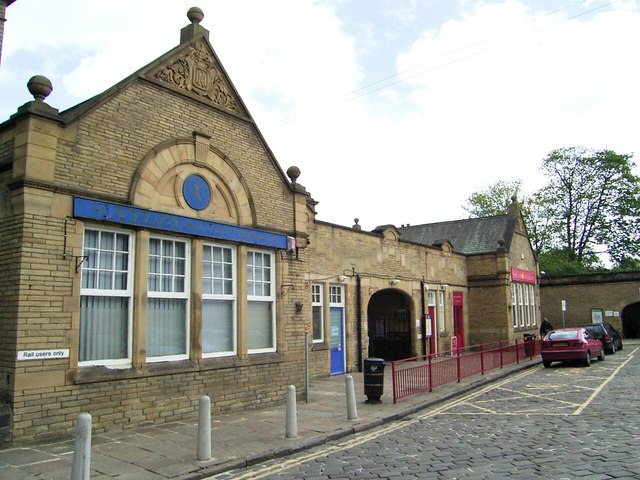
Bingley's railway station entrance

Bingley railway station is situated in the town centre. It is a stop on the Airedale Line, part of the West Yorkshire Metro railway network, with services to Leeds, Bradford Forster Square and Skipton. Services are operated by Northern Trains.

The A650 connects Bingley to Keighley and Skipton to the north-west, and to Shipley and Bradford to the south-east. Through traffic has been diverted onto the new dual carriageway avoiding the town centre.

Bingley is served by several bus routes, operated by First West Yorkshire and Keighley Bus Company.

Leeds Bradford Airport is located 10 miles (16 km) to the east.

The Leeds and Liverpool Canal passes through the town. There are several flights of locks in the Bingley section, the famous Five Rise Locks, the smaller Three Rise and a further two lock flight at Dowley Gap. The canal climbs steeply up the side of the Aire Valley through this section.

== Climate ==
As with all of the United Kingdom, Bingley experiences a maritime climate (Cfb), characterised by cool to mild weather, with often cloudy and damp conditions. This is amplified by Bingley's hilly northern situation. The nearest official met office weather station for which data is available is 'Bingley No. 2", actually located a couple of miles south of the town centre and at a relatively high 262 metres above sea level – More elevated than all of the urbanised area of Bingley. It is therefore likely that temperatures in central Bingley, at as little as 80 metres above sea level, tend to be 1 to 1.5 °C milder year round – though on cold clear nights this may be reversed as a temperature inversion takes hold.

The highest temperature recorded since 1980 at Bingley was 37.4 °C (99.3 °F) during July 2022. The lowest temperature to be recorded was −11.9 °C (10.6 °F) on 18 December 1981.

Climate data for Bingley No.2, elevation 262 metres (860 ft), 1971–2000
Month	Jan	Feb	Mar	Apr	May	Jun	Jul	Aug	Sep	Oct	Nov	Dec	Year
Mean daily maximum °C (°F)	5.2 (41.4)	5.3 (41.5)	7.6 (45.7)	10.0 (50.0)	13.8 (56.8)	16.4 (61.5)	18.8 (65.8)	18.5 (65.3)	15.5 (59.9)	11.8 (53.2)	8.0 (46.4)	6.0 (42.8)	11.4 (52.5)
Mean daily minimum °C (°F)	0.2 (32.4)	0.1 (32.2)	1.4 (34.5)	2.7 (36.9)	5.4 (41.7)	8.3 (46.9)	10.7 (51.3)	10.5 (50.9)	8.5 (47.3)	5.7 (42.3)	2.7 (36.9)	1.2 (34.2)	4.8 (40.6)
Average rainfall mm (inches)	108.6 (4.28)	78.5 (3.09)	85.9 (3.38)	71.4 (2.81)	63.9 (2.52)	70.4 (2.77)	53.1 (2.09)	75.9 (2.99)	83.3 (3.28)	95.4 (3.76)	102.1 (4.02)	117.9 (4.64)	1,006.4 (39.63)
Average rainy days (≥ 1.0 mm)	15.2	12.5	14.2	10.7	10.9	10.8	9.2	11.1	11.9	13.7	14.6	15.4	150.2
Source: Met Office

Data from the Met Office for the same weather station, but using more recent averages, showing changes to the climate in Bingley.

Climate data for Bingley No 2 (262 m elevation) 1981–2010
Month	Jan	Feb	Mar	Apr	May	Jun	Jul	Aug	Sep	Oct	Nov	Dec	Year
Mean daily maximum °C (°F)	5.5 (41.9)	5.6 (42.1)	8.1 (46.6)	10.7 (51.3)	14.3 (57.7)	16.9 (62.4)	19.1 (66.4)	18.7 (65.7)	15.9 (60.6)	12.1 (53.8)	8.3 (46.9)	5.8 (42.4)	11.8 (53.2)
Mean daily minimum °C (°F)	0.5 (32.9)	0.3 (32.5)	1.7 (35.1)	3.2 (37.8)	5.9 (42.6)	8.8 (47.8)	11.1 (52.0)	10.9 (51.6)	8.9 (48.0)	6.1 (43.0)	3.2 (37.8)	0.9 (33.6)	5.1 (41.2)
Average rainfall mm (inches)	109.8 (4.32)	77.2 (3.04)	81.5 (3.21)	72.9 (2.87)	65.2 (2.57)	77.1 (3.04)	63.0 (2.48)	81.1 (3.19)	77.1 (3.04)	99.8 (3.93)	105.2 (4.14)	114.3 (4.50)	1,024.1 (40.32)
Average rainy days (≥ 1.0 mm)	15.4	12.3	13.4	11.2	11.2	11.1	10.3	11.8	11.2	14.4	15.3	14.8	152.3
Source: metoffice.gov.uk

Data for the most recent climate period, 1991-2020:

Climate data for Bingley No 2 (262 m elevation) 1991–2020
Month	Jan	Feb	Mar	Apr	May	Jun	Jul	Aug	Sep	Oct	Nov	Dec	Year
Mean daily maximum °C (°F)	5.7 (42.3)	6.2 (43.2)	8.3 (46.9)	11.4 (52.5)	14.5 (58.1)	17.2 (63.0)	19.3 (66.7)	18.7 (65.7)	16.1 (61.0)	12.3 (54.1)	8.5 (47.3)	6.2 (43.2)	12.0 (53.7)
Mean daily minimum °C (°F)	1.0 (33.8)	0.9 (33.6)	1.9 (35.4)	3.6 (38.5)	6.2 (43.2)	9.1 (48.4)	11.2 (52.2)	11.2 (52.2)	9.2 (48.6)	6.5 (43.7)	3.5 (38.3)	1.4 (34.5)	5.5 (41.9)
Average rainfall mm (inches)	109.2 (4.30)	88.8 (3.50)	77.2 (3.04)	66.0 (2.60)	64.1 (2.52)	79.8 (3.14)	75.1 (2.96)	86.4 (3.40)	82.5 (3.25)	97.8 (3.85)	109.4 (4.31)	121.1 (4.77)	1,057.4 (41.64)
Average rainy days (≥ 1.0 mm)	15.8	13.5	12.4	10.8	11.0	11.2	11.4	12.7	11.8	14.2	15.9	15.8	156.5
Source: metoffice.gov.uk

== Education ==
Bingley provides a range of primary and secondary schools. The secondary schools are Beckfoot School, Bingley Grammar School and Samuel Lister Academy. Bingley Grammar School was founded in the 16th century and is one of the oldest schools in the country. Heather Bank School was a private preparatory school which closed in the 1970s. Beckfoot Grammar School moved into new, purpose-built, premises in June 2011 and the old buildings were demolished in 2012.

== Media ==
Local news and television programmes are provided by BBC Yorkshire and ITV Yorkshire. Television signals are received from the Emley Moor TV transmitter and the Keighley relay transmitter.

Local radio stations are BBC Radio Leeds, Drystone Radio, and Rombalds Radio, a community based radio station that broadcasts online.

The town is served by the local newspapers, Keighley News and Telegraph & Argus.

== Culture ==
Bradford City Council organised an annual music festival, Bingley Music Live in Myrtle Park. The festival evolved from Music At Myrtle and featured a range of musical genres including rock, alternative rock, indie rock and pop music. It was held at the end of August. First held in 2007, it was shortlisted in the 'Best New Festival' category of the Virtual Festival Awards. The ethos of the event is to present high quality music at an affordable price and give a platform for local bands from across West Yorkshire to a large audience. Artists such as The Charlatans, Happy Mondays, Scouting for Girls, The Automatic, Echo & The Bunnymen, Doves, The Zutons, Editors, Desert Eskimo, Calvin Harris, James, The Enemy, Seasick Steve and Professor Green have performed at Bingley Music Live since 2007.

Each year Bingley Show is held in Myrtle Park and is one of the largest one day shows in Europe. Its focus is on the horticultural and agricultural nature that reflects Bingley and its environs. The Bingley show has been held every year since 1867 apart from in 2012 when the event was cancelled due to flooding.

Bingley Little Theatre is both a venue and a major amateur group, with eight productions a year as well as studio pieces.

The first Airedale Terrier was bred in Bingley.

Since January 2015, Bingley is part of the Walkers are Welcome town network, aiming to make Yorkshire the friendliest place for walkers. Bingley Walkers are Welcome now works with the local community and businesses to increase footfall into the area and boosting the local economy.

== Notable people ==
- Frank W. Walbank (1909–2008), professor of Ancient History and world-renowned expert on Polybius. Born in Bingley.
- Prof William Stuart Mcrae Craig (1903–1975), medical author
- Ian Hutchinson, fifteen times Isle of Man TT winner, 2013 Macau Grand Prix winner and winner of the North West 200 road race. Born 12 August 1979
- The Ickeringill family, which included the noted Chartists Isaac Ickeringill (b. 1803) and his brother George (b. 1810) and Ira Ickringill (spelling accurate) (b. 1836), the Bradford mill founder, inventor and Mayor of Keighley, were born, raised and lived in Bingley.
- Percy Vear, professional boxer, born in Crossflatts, Bingley, 12 July 1911
- Fred Hoyle, astronomer, born in Bingley, 24 June 1915
- John Braine, author of Room at the Top. Worked in Bingley Library until 1942.
- Peter Sutcliffe (1946–2020), serial killer, born Bingley 2 June 1946
- Rodney Bewes, actor, most famous role Bob Ferris in The Likely Lads. Born in Bingley 27 November 1938.
- Muriel Aked, actress, born 9 November 1887 in Bingley, died 21 March 1955 in Settle.
- Pat Kirkwood, Musical theatre actress, lived in Bingley in her later years.
- William Twiss, (1745–1827), Royal Engineer and designer of the Martello Tower, lived in Bingley on retirement and is buried in All Saints Church, Bingley.
- Marmozets, rock band formed in Bingley who have released two albums (both UK top 30) on Roadrunner Records in 2014 and 2018.
- Bernard Markham, Bishop of Nassau and former pupil of Bingley Grammar School.
- Timothy Taylor, brewer of Fine Yorkshire Ales. Born in 1826, opened his first brewery, the Timothy Taylor Brewery, in 1858 – ales such as Landord, Ram Tam & Bolt Maker have won countless awards.
- Jessica Knappett, comedian, writer and actor, plays Lisa in The Inbetweeners Movie and is the creator, writer and acting lead in the E4 sitcom Drifters. Born in 1984.
- Juno Dawson, born in Bingley and educated at Bingley Grammar School, is an English author of young adult fiction and non-fiction. Dawson's notable works include the popular series Her Majesty's Royal Coven. She also wrote several Doctor Who related books and audio adventures.

== See also ==
- Listed buildings in Bingley
