= Crossflatts =

Ribbon development in West Yorkshire, England

Coordinates: 53.861°N 1.845°W

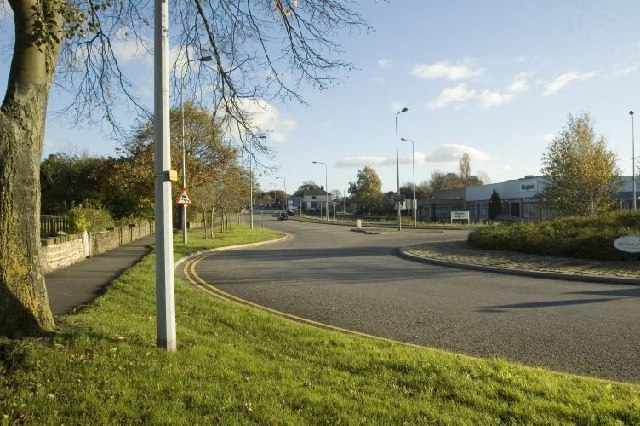
- Keighley Road

- Location within West Yorkshire
- OS grid reference: SE103405
- Metropolitan borough: City of Bradford
- Metropolitan county: West Yorkshire
- Region: Yorkshire and the Humber
- Country: England
- Sovereign state: United Kingdom
- Post town: BINGLEY
- Postcode district: BD16
- Dialling code: 01274
- Police: West Yorkshire
- Fire: West Yorkshire
- Ambulance: Yorkshire
- UK Parliament: Shipley

Crossflatts is a ribbon development in Airedale along the old route of the A650 road between Bingley and Keighley, in the Metropolitan Borough of Bradford, West Yorkshire, England. The opening of the Aire Valley Trunk road in 2004 has seen a reduction of 51% of traffic through the village.

It is served by Crossflatts railway station on the Airedale Line connecting Skipton with Bradford and Leeds. This small village adjoins Bingley at the famous Five Rise Locks.

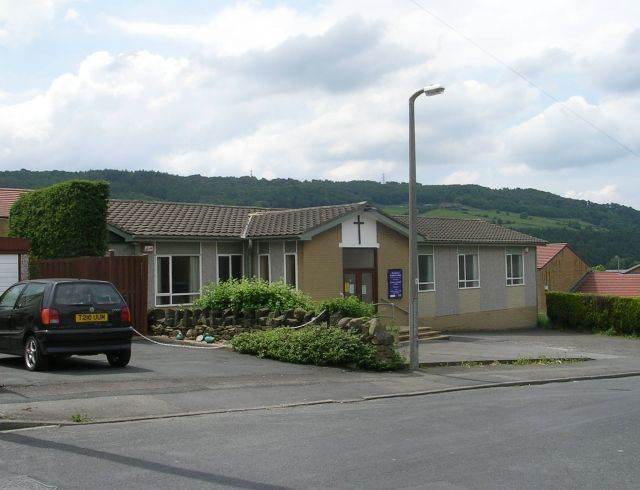
St. Aidan's church

Crossflatts is home to a number of local businesses, including The Royal Hotel (pub), Ryshworth Social Club, Crossflatts Cricket Club, Stuart Prices' butchers, as well as takeaway establishments, a chemist, a post office, a funeral parlour, a music shop and a church.

Crossflatts is also the home of UK Asset Resolution Ltd (UKAR), and Computershare, responsible for administering all remaining old NRAM and Bradford & Bingley mortgages in the UK.

== Sports clubs ==
Crossflatts has a crown green bowling club (Bingley Bowling Green Club Ltd, Slenningford) who play in the Worth Valley League and Aire-Wharfe League, two football clubs (Royal and Crossflatts) and a cricket club which plays in the Craven & District League.

Keighley Albion Juniors Rugby League club are based at Crossflatts Cricket Club.

== Notable people ==
- Herman "Percy" Vear (1911–1983), professional boxer
- Martin Whitcombe (1961), International Rugby Union player studied at Crossflatts Primary School
- Barry Watson (swimmer) (1939), Cross Channel swim record holder between 1964 & 1976, born and lives in Crossflatts
