= Eldwick =

Village in West Yorkshire, England

Coordinates: 53.861°N 1.811°W

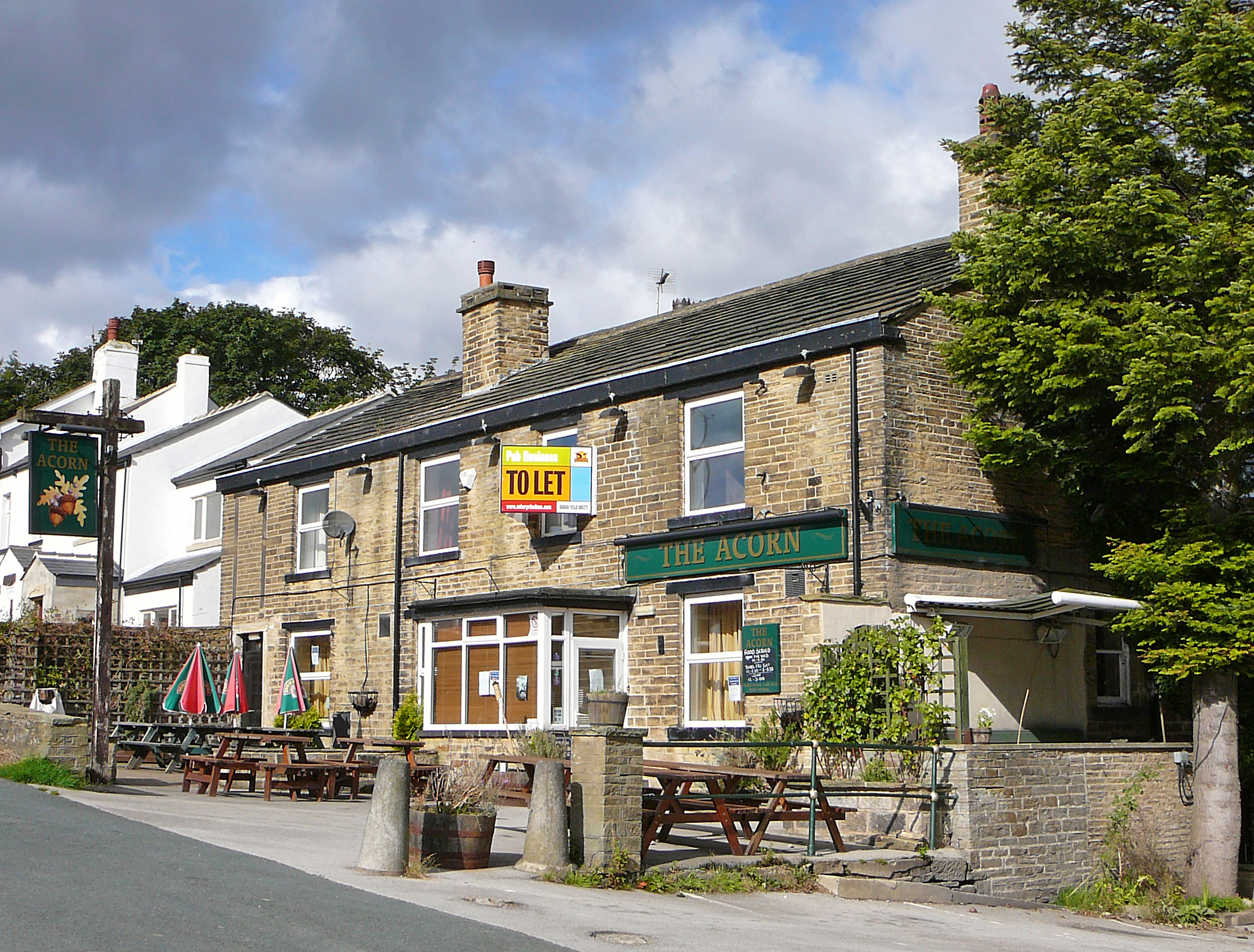
The Acorn pub in Eldwick.

Eldwick is a small village near Bingley in the City of Bradford district in West Yorkshire. It is split up into two main parts, Eldwick, the main populated part, and High Eldwick, the larger but less populated section, situated on Bingley Moor.

== Landmarks ==
High Eldwick is the site of Olympic show jumper Harvey Smith's stables, and the Dick Hudson's pub.

Eldwick Memorial Hall is built from old stone from the textile mill.

== Geography of the area ==
Much of Eldwick is situated on a plateau beyond the crest of the wooded escarpment to the east of Bingley. A small area of Eldwick is situated upon the escarpment's steep slope, including the Prince of Wales Park. The park and the rest of the wooded area south of it form a natural dividing line running north–south between Eldwick and Bingley.

The village has Eldwick Beck running through it. The name has come to refer to the part of the village just before entry into High Eldwick, near the Methodist Church and The Acorn Pub.

== Transport ==
The village is served by the 615, 616 and 619 bus services and a turnaround in High Eldwick serves as the terminus for these routes. They have a three buses per hour frequency in either direction, with buses taking passengers to Bingley and beyond. The nearest railway station is Bingley.

== Notable people ==
- James Hill (British Director) (1919–1994).
- Brian Sellers (Yorkshire cricket administrator) (1907-1981)

== See also ==
- Listed buildings in Bingley
