= Gilstead =

Village in West Yorkshire, England

Coordinates: 53.851°N 1.815°W

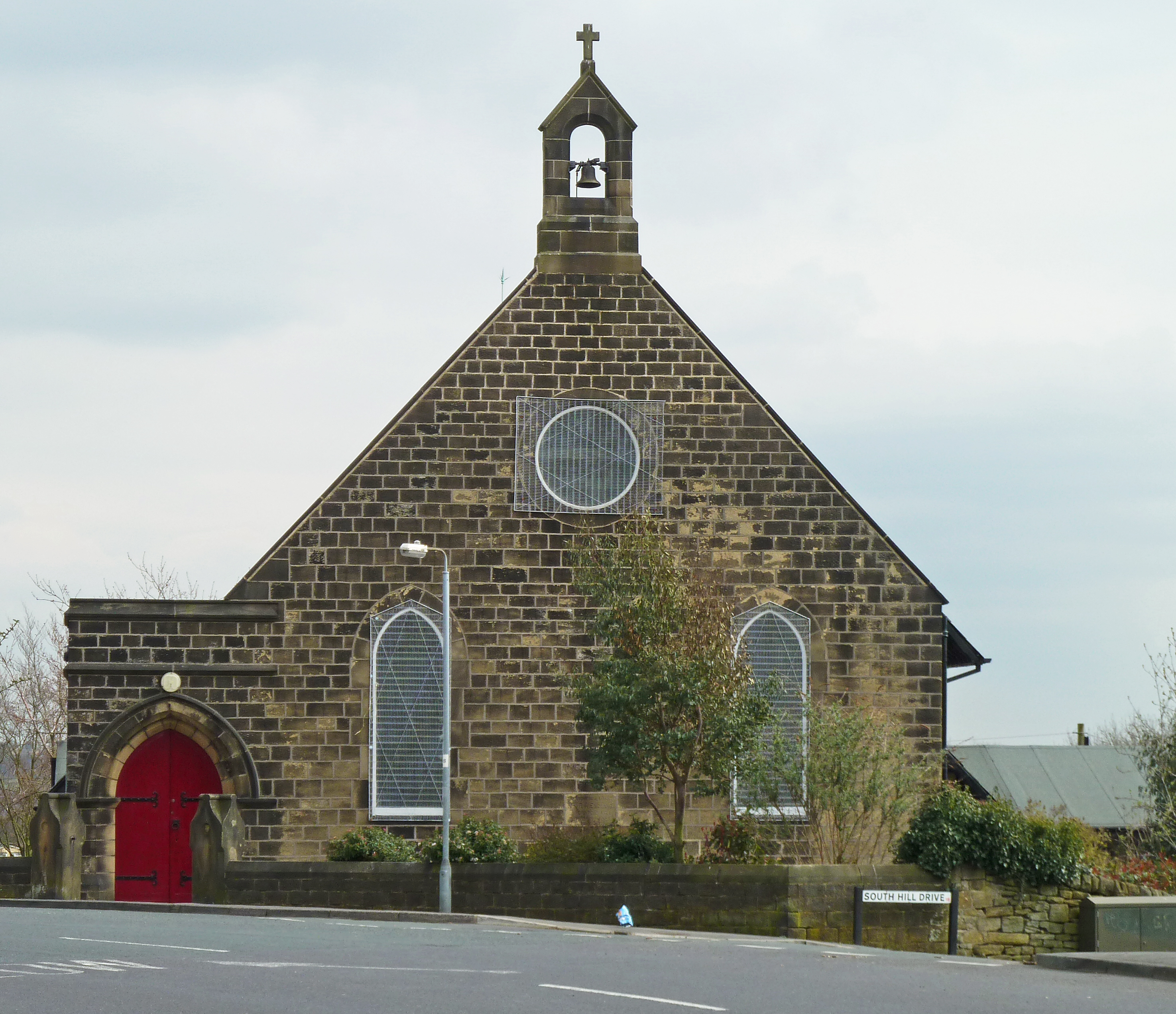
St Wilfrid Church, Gilstead.

Gilstead is a village within the City of Bradford Metropolitan District, West Yorkshire, England. It is situated at the edge of the moors, above the town of Bingley which is the post town.

Eldwick Primary School is located on Warren Lane, Gilstead. This is a primary school with around 450 pupils aged 3–11.

The village came to note in January 2007 when a rare sighting in Britain was made of an American robin.

== Notable residents ==
Gilstead is notable as the birthplace, on 24 June 1915, of astronomer and writer Sir Fred Hoyle and showjumper Harvey Smith.

== See also ==
- Listed buildings in Bingley
