= Chigwell Hall =

House in Chigwell, Essex, England

Coordinates: 51.6248°N 0.0762°E

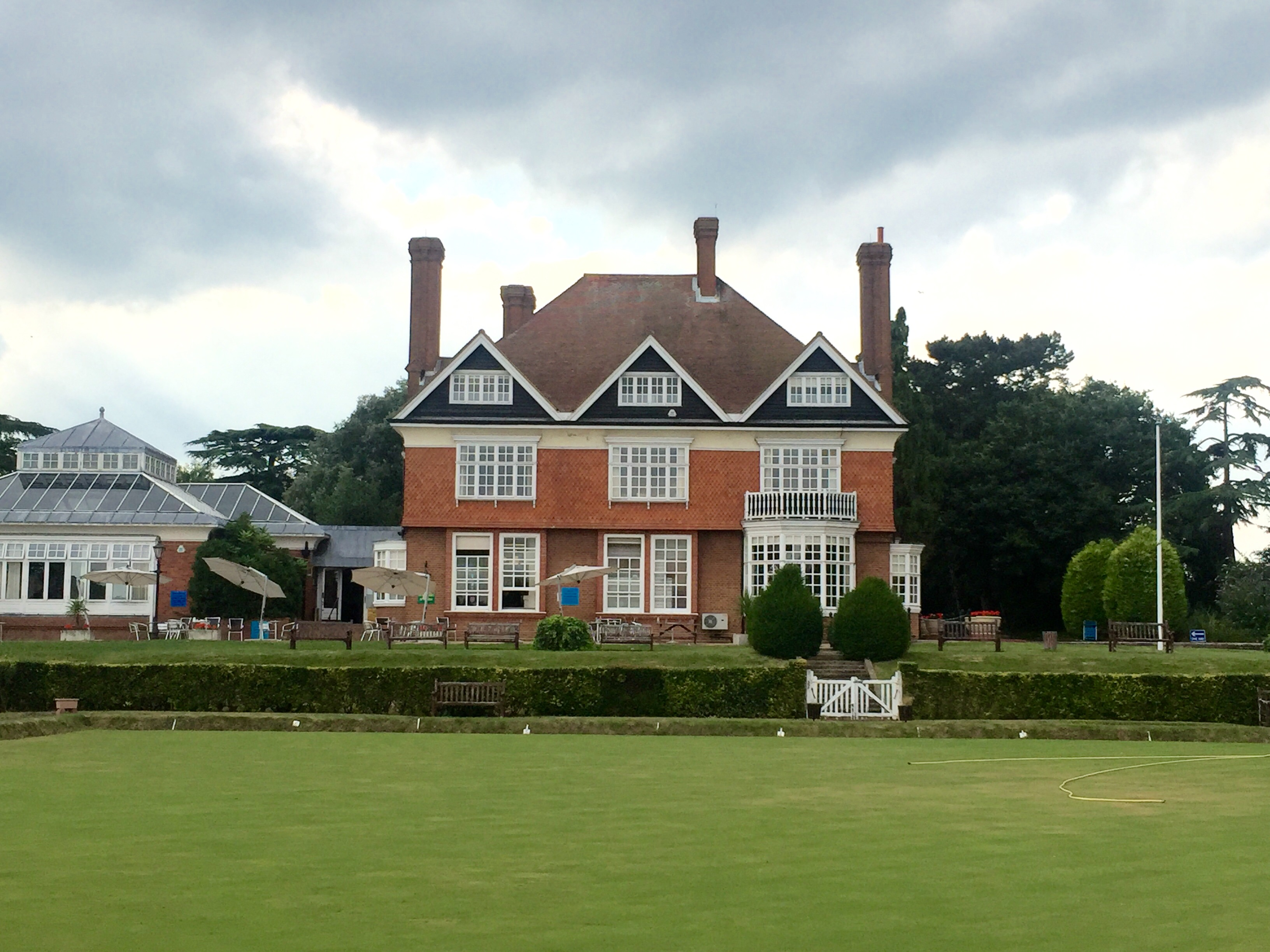
Chigwell Hall

Chigwell Hall is a Grade II listed house in Chigwell, Essex. It is situated on Roding Lane within 42 acres of grounds. It was designed by the English architect Richard Norman Shaw - his only house in Essex - for Alfred Savill, founder of the Savills estate agency, and built in 1876. The building and grounds have been owned by the Metropolitan Police Service since 1967 and is the current site of the force's sports and social club.

Chigwell Hall was built on the grounds to the south west of Chigwell Manor, a medieval building in Roding Lane which had belonged to the Branston family for two generations. In 1881 Savill decided to abandon the older house and moved into Chigwell Hall. It is located on High Road, Chigwell, near to the Kings Head, a 17th-century public house made famous by Charles Dickens who used it as a basis for The Maypole Inn, for his novel Barnaby Rudge. As well as being the residence of the Metropolitan Police's sports and social club, Chigwell Hall is also used for business functions, wedding ceremonies, and is the venue of a restaurant.

The Pevsner Architectural Guides describes the hall as "especially good, surprising in its freshness and looking as it might well [have been built] twenty-five years later".

== Sources ==
- Bettley, James; Pevsner, Nikolaus (2007). Essex. The Buildings of England. Newhaven, USA and London, UK: Yale University Press. ISBN 978-0-300-11614-4. OCLC 494378278.
- Pevsner, Nikolaus (1965). The Buildings of England: Essex. London: Penguin Books. ISBN 978-0-300-11614-4.
- Watson, John A. F. (1977). Savills: a family and a firm, 1652-1977. Michigan: Hutchinson Benham. ISBN 978-0-091-29590-5.
