= St Michael's Church, Bournemouth =

Grade II* listed Gothic Victorian church in Bournemouth, Dorset, England

Coordinates: 50°25′53″N 1°31′55″W

St Michael's Church
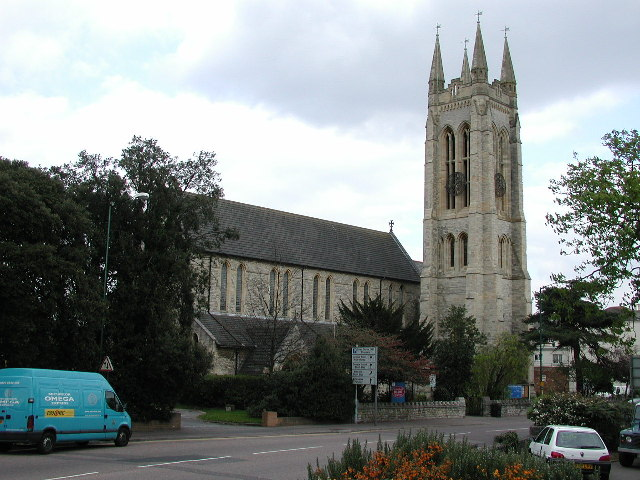
- Saint Michael's Church, Bournemouth as seen from the southwest (pictured in 2003)

Religion
- Affiliation: Anglicanism
- Ecclesiastical or organizational status: active
- Year consecrated: 20 January 1876

Location
- Location: Bournemouth, Dorset, England
- Interactive map of St Michael's Church

Architecture
- Architect: Richard Norman Shaw
- Type: Church
- Style: Gothic Revival
- Completed: 1875

St Michael's Church is a Grade II* listed Gothic Victorian church in Bournemouth, Dorset, England.

== History ==
The church was built in 1875 and was consecrated on 20 January 1876. Together with St Swithun's Church, St Michael's was one of the town's two central churches to be designed by Richard Norman Shaw.

In December 1884, clergyman Dennis Hird was ordained as a Church of England deacon and appointed to St Michaels. The Reverend Lord Theobald Butler was honorary assistant priest following his retirement from Ulcombe until his death, and was buried at St Michael's.

In 2021, the church was renamed St Mike's to attract younger generations. The church is on the Heritage at Risk Register of Historic England.

== Gallery ==
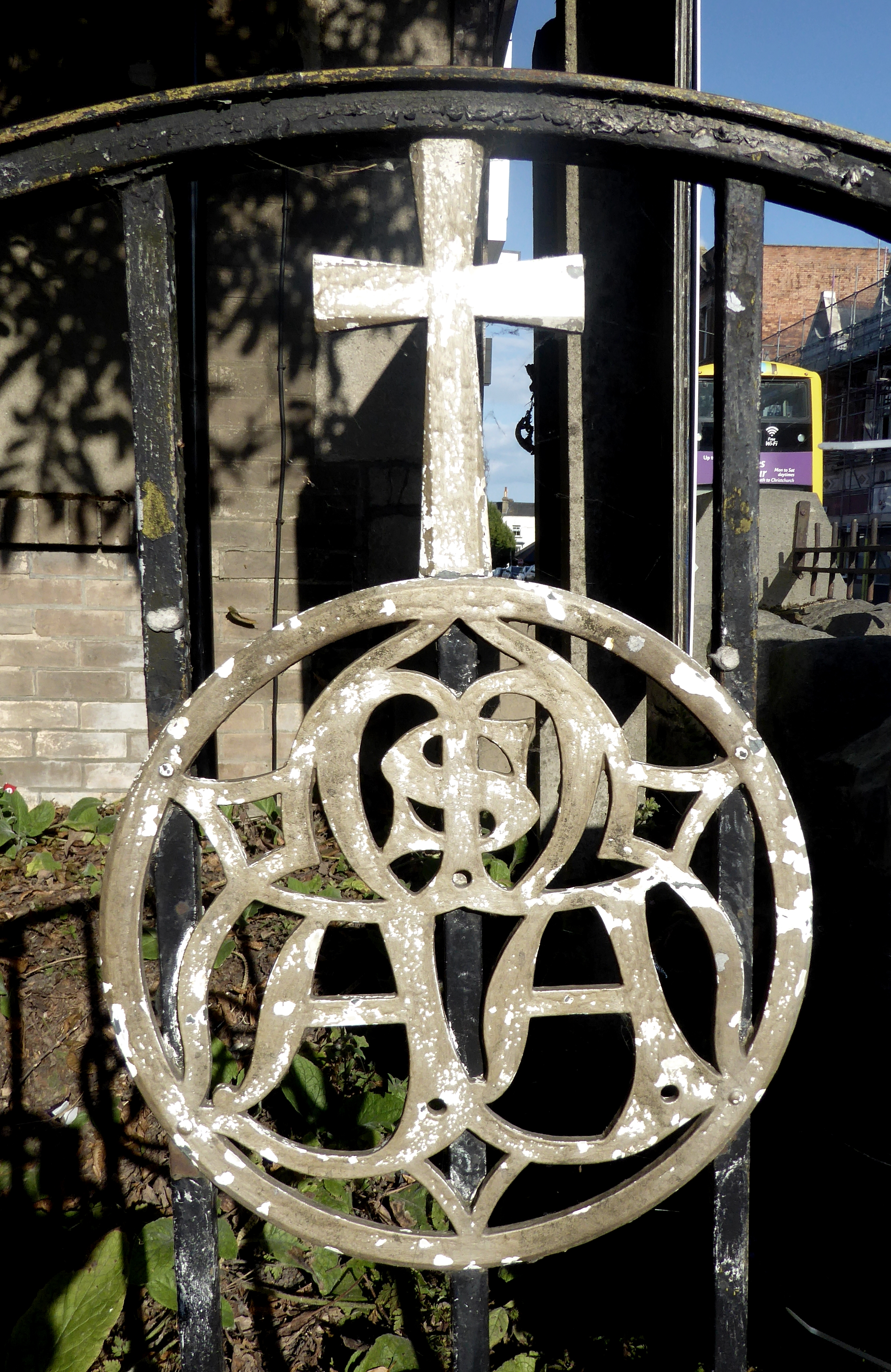
Symbol on the church gate.

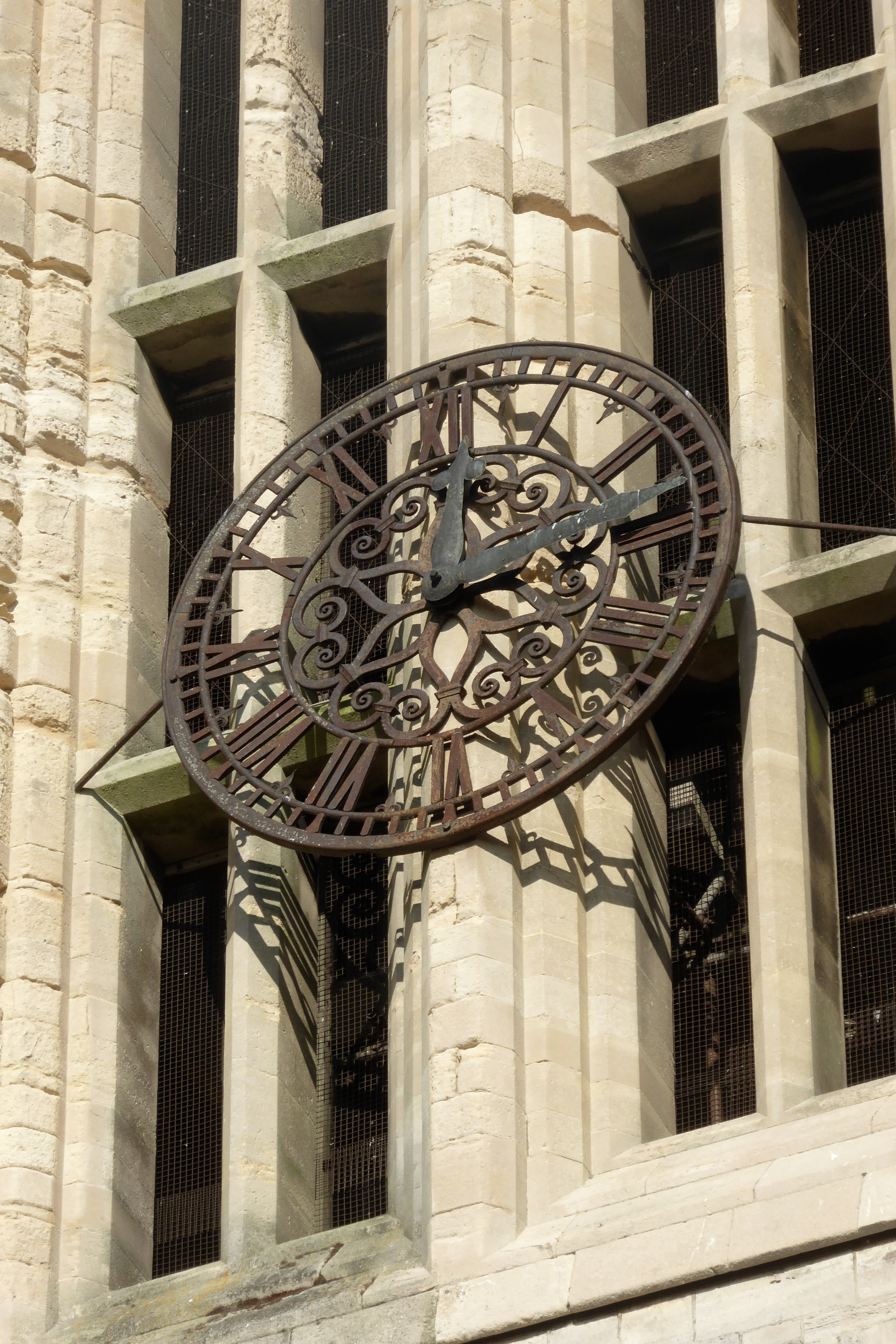
Church clock.

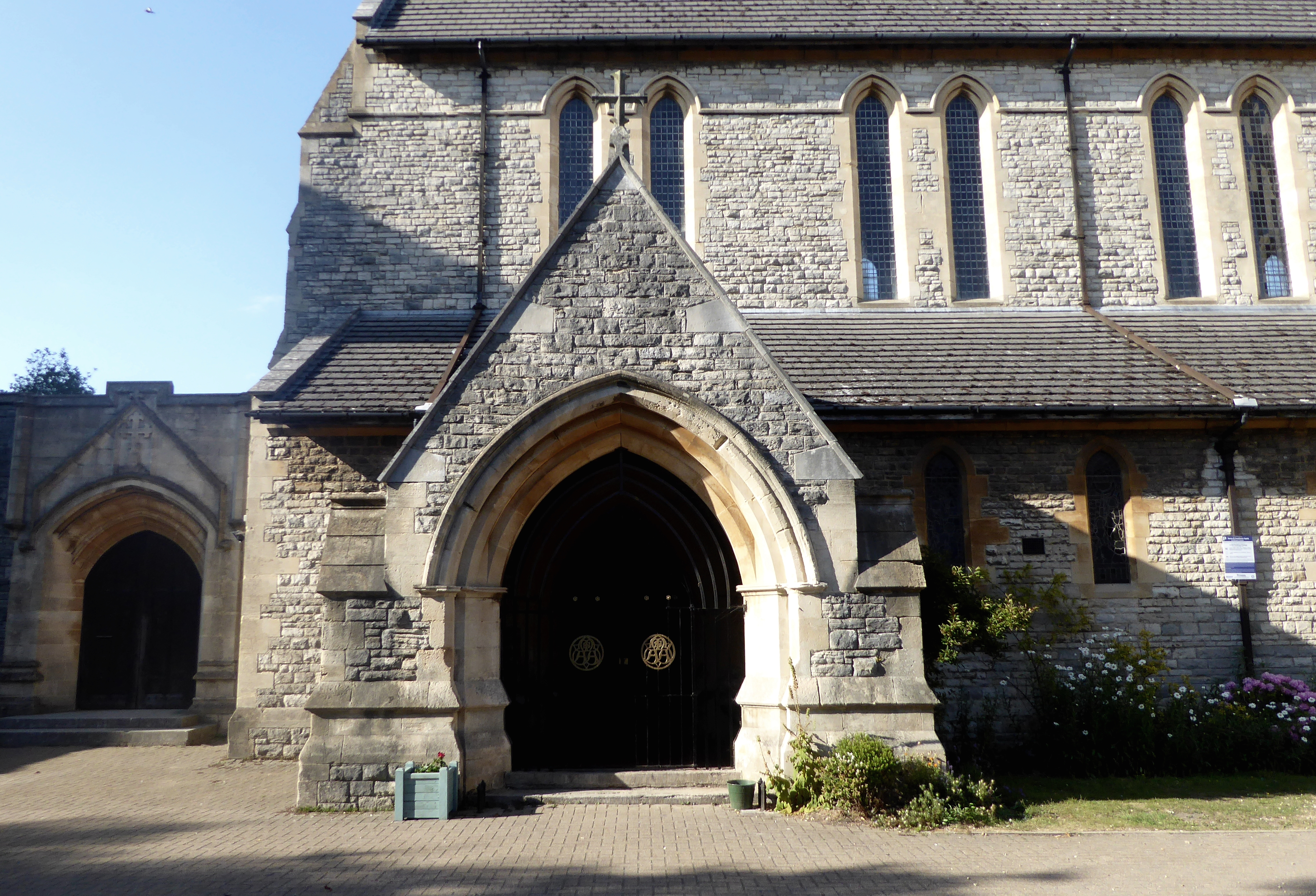
Church entrance.

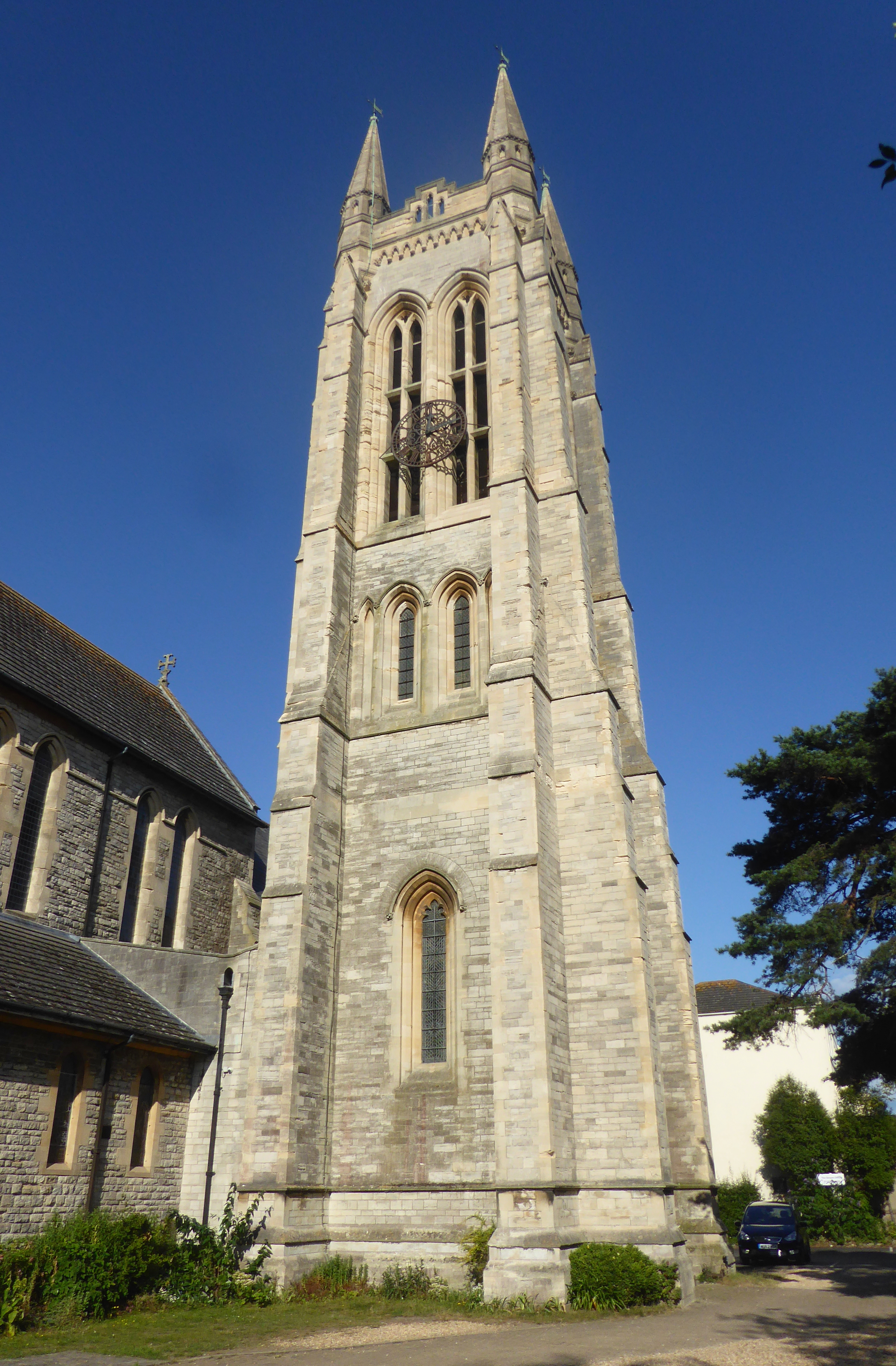
Church tower.

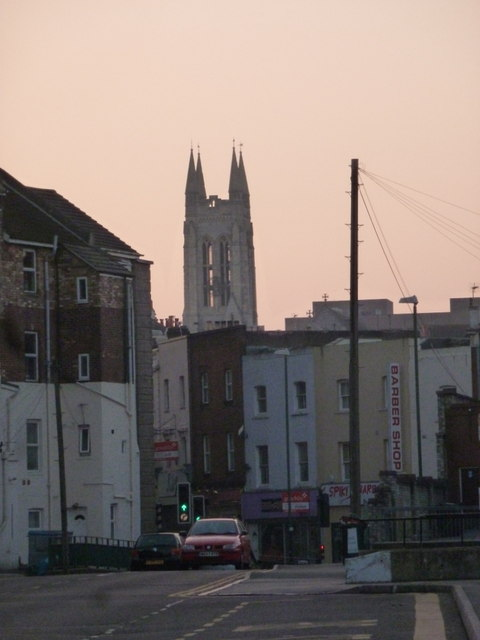
The church from a distance way.

== See also ==
- List of churches in Bournemouth
