= Holy Trinity Church, Bingley =

Anglican church in Bingley, West Yorkshire, England

Coordinates: 53°50′44.0″N 1°49′49.9″W

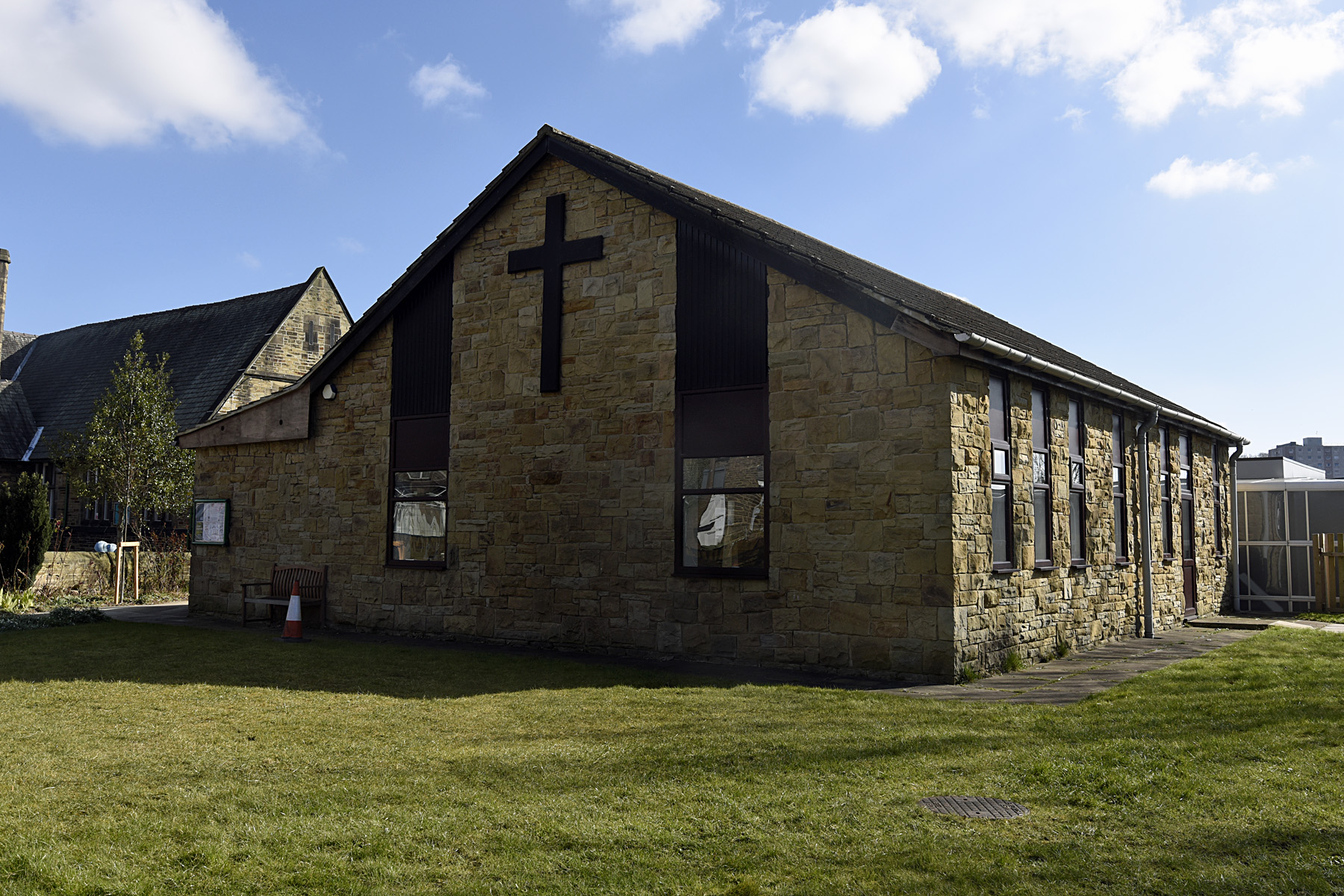
- Holy Trinity Church, Bingley
- OS grid reference: SE 11248 38824
- Country: England
- Denomination: Church of England
- Website: Official Website

History
- Status: Parish Church
- Dedicated: 5 December 1975

Architecture
- Functional status: Active

Administration
- Diocese: Leeds
- Archdeaconry: Bradford
- Deanery: Airedale
- Parish: Holy Trinity, Bingley

Clergy
- Vicar: Reverend Andrew Clarke

Holy Trinity Church is an Anglican parish church in the town of Bingley, West Yorkshire, England notable for its original church being demolished by explosive charge on 7 April 1974.

== History ==
Up until 1868, the parish in Bingley was singular under the Church of All Saints in the north of the town. The population in Bingley had increased greatly during the 19th century due to the Industrial Revolution and the decision was taken to create a new parish when All Saints Church was too full to carry on. The Council voted to establish a chapelry upon the new parish on the 8 May 1869. The new parish would include Gilstead, Cottingley and parts of the new town of Bingley. Because of the influence of Tractarianism, when the plans for the new Italian Gothic church went on show, some denounced it as Roman . The church's Pre-Raphaelite influenced building caused John Ruskin, who was staying in Bingley in 1881, to comment that it was of 'severe simplicity and dignity.' Pevsner described the building as; "disappointing, dark in its desperately drab surroundings, and the school also built at the same time would scarcely be recognized as the work of an architect of genius".

The church was consecrated on the 23 October 1868 by Bishop Bickersteth when a population of 4,500 was assigned to it. The church, designed by the Victorian architect Richard Norman Shaw, was built without a tower, although one was added later which the foundations were not strong enough for. Even as soon as 1882, it was noted that the tower was unsafe when a large stone came crashing down during a church service shocking the congregation.

In 1973, cracks were beginning to show in the church and the tower was scaffolded to allow piecemeal demolition of the structure. Two weeks before its explosive demolition, workmen at the top said that they heard the tower and church audibly creak and groan prompting the mass evacuation of nearby houses. The decision was taken by convention of the architects, demolition experts and church authorities that blasting was the only option and so the tower and church were demolished by explosive charge on Palm Sunday in 1974. The congregation raised £23,000 to build a new church on the site. This structure was dedicated on the 5 December 1975 and is still in use today with the stained glass from the original windows re-used in the Rose Window of the new church.

A Sunday school was formed adjacent to the church in 1870, opening in 1871, Holy Trinity School became an all day boy and girls school in 1872.

The parish includes St Wilfreds in Gilstead and along with the parish of Church of All Saints, Bingley (which includes the churches of St. Aidan, Crossflatts and St. Lawrence, Eldwick) is part of the Bingley Group Ministry. The benefice used to lie within the Diocese of Bradford, but since 20 April 2014 it is now in the Diocese of Leeds.

== Vicars of Holy Trinity ==
The following is taken from booklet Holy Trinity Parish Church 1868 – 1968 and from local records.

Name	Tenure	Notes
Reverend Albert Hudson	1868–1877	
Reverend H. L. Williams	1877–1888	
Reverend F. W. Bardsley	1888–1910	
Reverend F. A. Hodd	1910–1923	
Reverend H. W. Sherwin	1923–1926	
Reverend P. Sowerby	1927–1932	
Reverend G. S. Addison	1932–1935	
Reverend A. Langford Jones	1935–1937	The Lady Chapel of the old Trinity building is dedicated in memory of Rev Jones
Reverend R. H. Place	1938–1944	
Reverend Hugh Hunter	1944–1954	Honorary Canon of Bradford Cathedral 1948
Reverend Arthur Raymond Gaunt	1955–1958	
Reverend W. H. McLaren	1960–1965	
Reverend Peter Amor	1965–1972	
Reverend John Holford	1973–1986	
Reverend John Cooper	1987–1992	
Reverend Andrew Clarke	1993 –	Current incumbent
