= Leyswood =

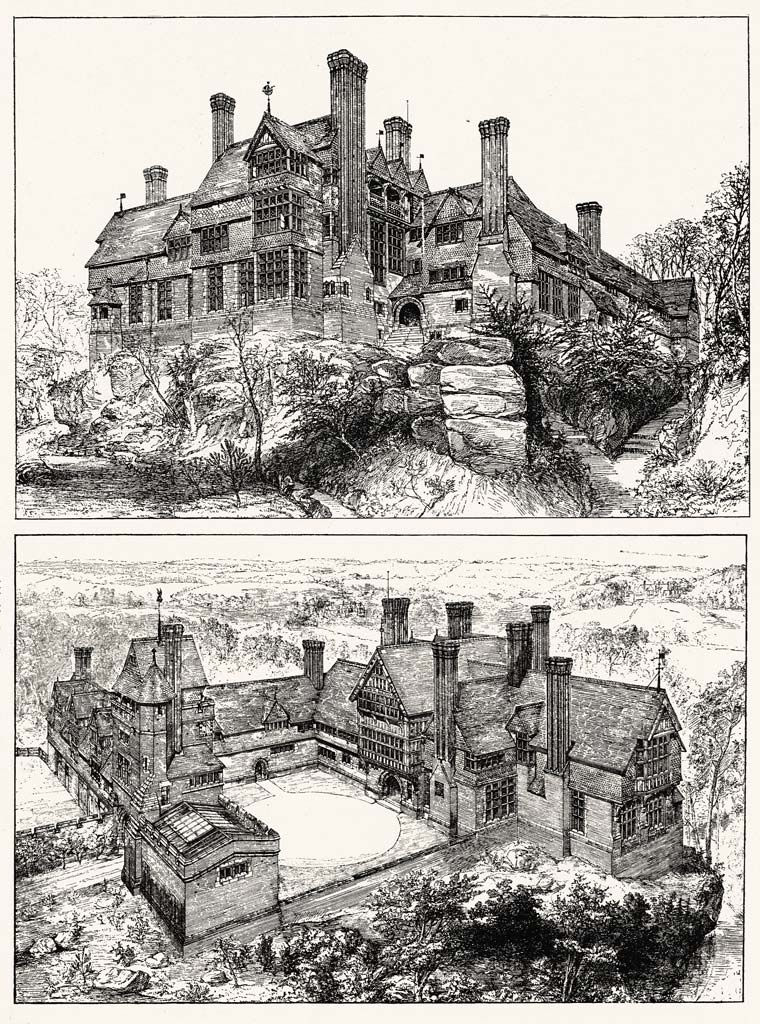
Illustrations from Hermann Muthesius's German book on The English House, 1904.

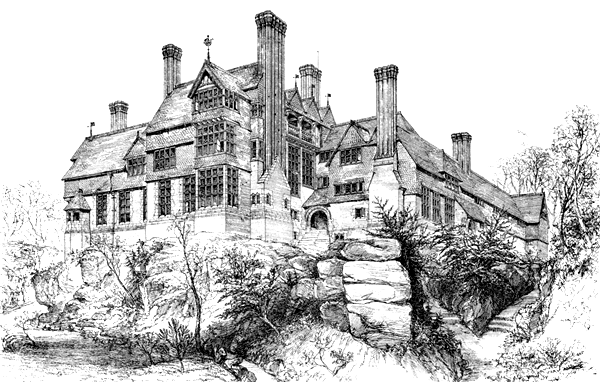
Leyswood, after the architect's drawings.

Leyswood (or Leys Wood or Leyes Wood) is an architecturally notable house in Groombridge, East Sussex, that was designed by Richard Norman Shaw, and completed in 1868. It was a large mansion around a courtyard, complete with mock battlements, towers, half-timbered upper facades and tall chimneys – all features quite readily associated with Tudor architecture; in Shaw's hands, this less fantastical style achieved immediate maturity.

It was substantially reduced in size in 1955 resulting in a significant change in appearance.
