= Alfred Savill =

Alfred Savill (1829–1905) was the founder of Savills, one of the United Kingdom's largest estate agents.

== Life and career ==
Alfred Savill was born in Chigwell, Essex. He was educated at Chigwell School, after which he entered business, and worked as a land agent, surveyor and auctioneer. He opened the first office of Savills in the City of London in 1855.

In 1867, Savill became a governor of his former school, Chigwell, a position he held until his death. He also acted as treasurer for the School for twenty-one years. He would attend 'January dinners' along with his brother, Philip, at the King's Head Inn, alongside other names connected with the School and local area (H. S. King, Nathanael Powell, J. Perry-Watlington, the Rev. W. Meadows, Rev. Marsden, Canon Richard Dawson Swallow, T. Keen, and Col. Ryan).

In 1876, he commissioned the building of Chigwell Hall as his home. He was also a supporter of various charitable causes, and gave land away to allow the construction of a chapel at Squirrels Heath near Hornchurch in 1884. He died in March 1905.

== Family and legacy ==
Savill's practice, then known as Alfred Savill & Sons, continued to be managed by his sons and later became Savills, one of the country's largest estate agents. His grandson Sir Eric Savill, also a chartered surveyor, worked for the Crown Estate as manager of Windsor Great Park and was the creator of Savill Garden located within the park.
