= Ellern Mede =

- Location within Greater London
- 51°37′53.45″N 0°13′11″W
- Location: Totteridge Common, Barnet, North London, England

History
- Built: 1876–77

Site notes
- Architect: Richard Norman Shaw

Listed Building – Grade II
- Official name: Ellern Mede
- Designated: 14 February 1975
- Reference no.: 1359108

Ellern Mede is a specialist private provider of eating disorder services in England. It runs two hospitals in North London and one in Rotherham. The hospital in Warwick Road, Barnet opened in 2017. The service takes referrals from Child and Adolescent Mental Health Services for children with anorexia.

== Building ==
The company is named after Ellern Mede, a large detached house at 31 Totteridge Common in the London Borough of Barnet, N20. It was built between 1876 and 1877 by the architect Richard Norman Shaw for businessman William Austin.

The design is described by Nikolaus Pevsner as "one of Shaw's asymmetrical Old English L-plan compositions...big, bold half-timbered gable over the entrance, and broad tile-hung flank with half-hipped gable, all anchored by tall chimneys".

== History ==
In recent years Ellern Mede has been a nursing home, and the Ellern Mede Centre for Eating Disorders was founded in the building in 2000, before moving to Mill Hill in May 2011.
