= Richard Norman Shaw =

British architect (1831–1912)

- Born: Richard Norman Shaw; 7 May 1831; Edinburgh, Scotland
- Died: 17 November 1912 (aged 81); London, England
- Occupation: Architect
- Spouse: Agnes Wood (m. 1867)

Richard Norman Shaw RA (7 May 1831 – 17 November 1912), also known as Norman Shaw, was a British architect who worked from the 1870s to the 1900s, known for his country houses and for commercial buildings. He is considered to be among the greatest of British architects; his influence on architectural style was strongest in the 1880s and 1890s.

== Early life and education ==
Shaw was born 7 May 1831 in Edinburgh, the sixth and last child of William Shaw (1780–1833), an Irish Protestant and army officer, and Elizabeth née Brown (1785–1883), from a family of successful Edinburgh lawyers. William Shaw died 2 years after his son's birth, leaving debts. Two of Shaw's siblings died young and a third in early adulthood. The family lived first in Annandale Street and then Haddington Place. Norman was educated at an academy for languages, located at 3 and 5 Hill Street Edinburgh until c.1842, then had one year of formal schooling in Newcastle, followed by being taught by his sister Janet. The eldest surviving child Robert had moved to London to work; the rest of the family followed about 1846, living in Middleton Road, Dalston. Norman began his apprenticeship almost immediately at an unknown architect's practice.

By 1849, he had transferred to the London office of sixty-year-old William Burn, at whose practice Shaw remained for five years. He attended the evening lectures on architecture given at the Royal Academy of Arts by Charles Robert Cockerell. He met William Eden Nesfield at the Royal Academy, with whom he briefly partnered in some architectural designs. During 1854–1856, Shaw travelled with a Royal Academy scholarship, collecting sketches that were published as Architectural Sketches from the Continent, 1858. On his return to London he moved to George Edmund Street's practice.

== Practice ==
In 1863, after sixteen years of training, Shaw opened a practice for a short time with Nesfield. In 1872, he was elected an Associate of the Royal Academy.

Shaw worked for, among others, the artists John Callcott Horsley and George Henry Boughton, and the industrialist Lord Armstrong. He designed large houses such as Cragside, Grim's Dyke, and Chigwell Hall, as well as a series of commercial buildings using a wide range of styles.

Shaw was elected to the Royal Academy in 1877, and co-edited (with Sir Thomas Jackson RA) the 1892 collection of essays, Architecture, a profession or an Art?. He firmly believed it was an art. In later years, Shaw moved to a heavier classical style which influenced the emerging Edwardian Classicism of the early 20th century. Shaw died in London, where he had designed residential buildings in areas such as Pont Street, and public buildings such as New Scotland Yard.

Shaw's early country houses avoided Neo-Gothic and the academic styles, reviving vernacular materials like half timber and hanging tiles, with projecting gables and tall massive chimneys with "inglenooks" for warm seating. Shaw's houses soon attracted the misnomer the "Queen Anne style". As his skills developed, he dropped some of the mannered detailing, his buildings gained in dignity, and acquired an air of serenity and a quiet homely charm which were less conspicuous in his earlier works; half timber construction was more sparingly used, and finally disappeared entirely.

== Family and later life ==
On 16 July 1867, Shaw married Agnes Haswell Wood at the parish church in Hampstead. She was the daughter of James Wood and was born in New South Wales, and most of the Wood siblings were sent to England for part of their education. All the children but Agnes returned to New South Wales and from there, most of the family moved to Christchurch in New Zealand. Agnes lived with an aunt in England and in 1866, she became engaged to Shaw. Her nephew, Cecil Wood (1878–1947), was gifted at drawing and Shaw's career is assumed to have been an influence in Cecil Wood becoming an architect.

In later life he lived at 6 Ellerdale Road, Hampstead, London. He died in London and is buried in St John-at-Hampstead Churchyard, Hampstead, London.

== Bedford Park, London ==
One of Shaw's major commissions was the planning and designing of buildings for Bedford Park, London. Shaw was commissioned in 1877 by Jonathan T. Carr though his involvement only lasted until 1879. He designed St Michael and All Angels, Bedford Park, as the Anglican parish church for the development.

== Built work ==
Place	Location	County/Country	Date	Listed	Notes
Holme Grange School	Wokingham	Berkshire	1883		
Greenham Lodge		Berkshire			
Highdown School	Emmer Green, Reading	Berkshire	1878–1880		
Dawpool		Cheshire			Demolished 1927.
All Saints' Church, Youlgreave	Youlgreave	Derbyshire	1869–1870		Restoration.
St Giles' Church	Longstone	Derbyshire	1872–1873		Restoration.
Flete House		Devonshire			
House of Bethany	St. Clement's Road, Bournemouth	Dorset	1874–1875		
Bryanston School		Dorset	1898		
St Swithun's Church	Bournemouth	Dorset	1876-1877	II	Grade II listed church.
St Michael's Church	Bournemouth	Dorset	1875	II*	Nave of a Grade II listed church.
Bannow	St Leonards-on-Sea	East Sussex	1877		Tile-hung, timber-framed construction originally featuring a museum room with skylight. Designed for the Rev. John White Tottenham; now a retirement home.
Baldslow Place	St Leonards-on-Sea	East Sussex	1888		Originally the Ebden family home, now Claremont School.
Chigwell Hall	Chigwell	Essex	1876		The building is now owned by the Metropolitan Police.
St John's Church	Boxmoor	Hertfordshire	1874	II	Grade II listed church.
Flora Fountain	Mumbai	India	1864		
Gawsworth Old Rectory	Gawsworth	Cheshire	1873	I	Restoration.
Alcroft Grange	Tyler Hill, Canterbury	Kent	1880s		Now divided into 4 wings.
Swanscombe Church		Kent			
4 – 6 Page Heath Lane	Bickley	Kent	1864		
The Corner House	114 Shortlands Road, Beckenham	Kent	1869		
Hillside	Groombridge	Kent	1871		Grade II Listed, considered most typical of his work in Kent
Bailiff's Cottage	Bromley Palace Estate, Bromley	Kent	1864		Demolished.
Town Hall	Market Square, Bromley	Kent	1863		Unexecuted.
Albion House	James Street, Liverpool	Lancashire	1896–1898		
1–2 St. James Street		London	1882–83		
Grim's Dyke	Harrow	London	1870	II	
New Zealand Chambers	Leadenhall Street	London	1871–1873		Destroyed by enemy action, WWII. Featured Ipswich windows.
Lowther Lodge	Kensington	London	1873–1875		Headquarters of the Royal Geographical Society.
6 Ellerdale Road	Hampstead	London			Built for himself.
8 Melbury Road	Kensington	London	1872–1873		Built for painter Marcus Stone.
Woodland House	31 Melbury Road, Kensington	London	1876–1877		Built for painter Luke Fildes.
Kelston	42 Netherhall Gardens, Hampstead	London	1878		Built for painter Edwin Long; subsequently the home of Edward Elgar 1912–1921. Demolished in the 1930s.
Swan House	17 Chelsea Embankment	London	1875–1877		
Ellern Mede	31 Totteridge Common, Barnet	London	1877		
Bedford Park	Chiswick	London	1879–1882		The first "garden city" suburban development: housing, including St. Michael and All Angels Church.
196 Queen's Gate	196 Queen's Gate	London	1875		Five story redbrick home for art collector John Postle Heseltine and his family. Later divided into flats. Grade II listed 1958
Albert Hall Mansions	Kensington Gore	London	1879–1886		
Tabard Hotel	Chiswick	London	1880	II*	
Bolney House	Kingston House estate, London Knightsbridge	London	1883		Demolished in the 1960s.
Norman Shaw Buildings	Thames Embankment	London	1887–1906		Originally built as the new headquarters of the Metropolitan Police, and the first location to be known as New Scotland Yard. The two buildings are now used as Parliamentary offices.
Kate Greenaway House	Frognal	London	1885		
1 St. James's Street		London	1904		
Trevanion	Totteridge Lane, Barnet	London	1883–1884		
Piccadilly Hotel	Piccadilly Circus	London	1905–1908		His last work.
Gatehouse to Banqueting Hall	Jesmond Dene	Newcastle upon Tyne	1869–1870		
Didlington Hall	Didlington	Norfolk	1879–1886		The property of William Tyssen-Amherst. Demolished in the 1950s.
Cragside	Rothbury	Northumberland	1869/1870–1885		The first house in the world to be lit by hydroelectricity; built for Lord Armstrong.
Chesters		Northumberland			
Preen Manor		Shropshire			
Adcote	Little Ness	Shropshire	1876–1881		
Knight's Bank	Farnham	Surrey	1868		Demolished 1932.
Pierrepont and Merrist Wood		Surrey			
WoodPecker Lodge	Holly Lane, Worplesdon	Surrey	1930	11	Also known as North Lodge. Built in the twentieth century as a replica to the opposite south lodge.
Pierrepont House	Frensham	Surrey	1876–1878		
Alderbrook Park	Cranleigh	Surrey	1881		Demolished 1956 – house for Pandeli Ralli.
Leyswood	Withyham	Sussex	1866–1869		
Bannow	St. Leonard's	Sussex	1877–1879		Private house, now nursing home.
Withyham		Sussex	1867		
Gorehill	Petworth	West Sussex	1871		
Old School House	Hammerwood, Nr East Grinstead	West Sussex	1872	II	Formerly the village school.
Wispers		West Sussex	1874–1876		
White Lodge and White Lodge West	Bingley	West Yorkshire			
Bradford City Hall extension		Yorkshire	1909		
Holy Trinity Church	Bingley	Yorkshire	1866–1868		Demolished 1974.

== Gallery ==
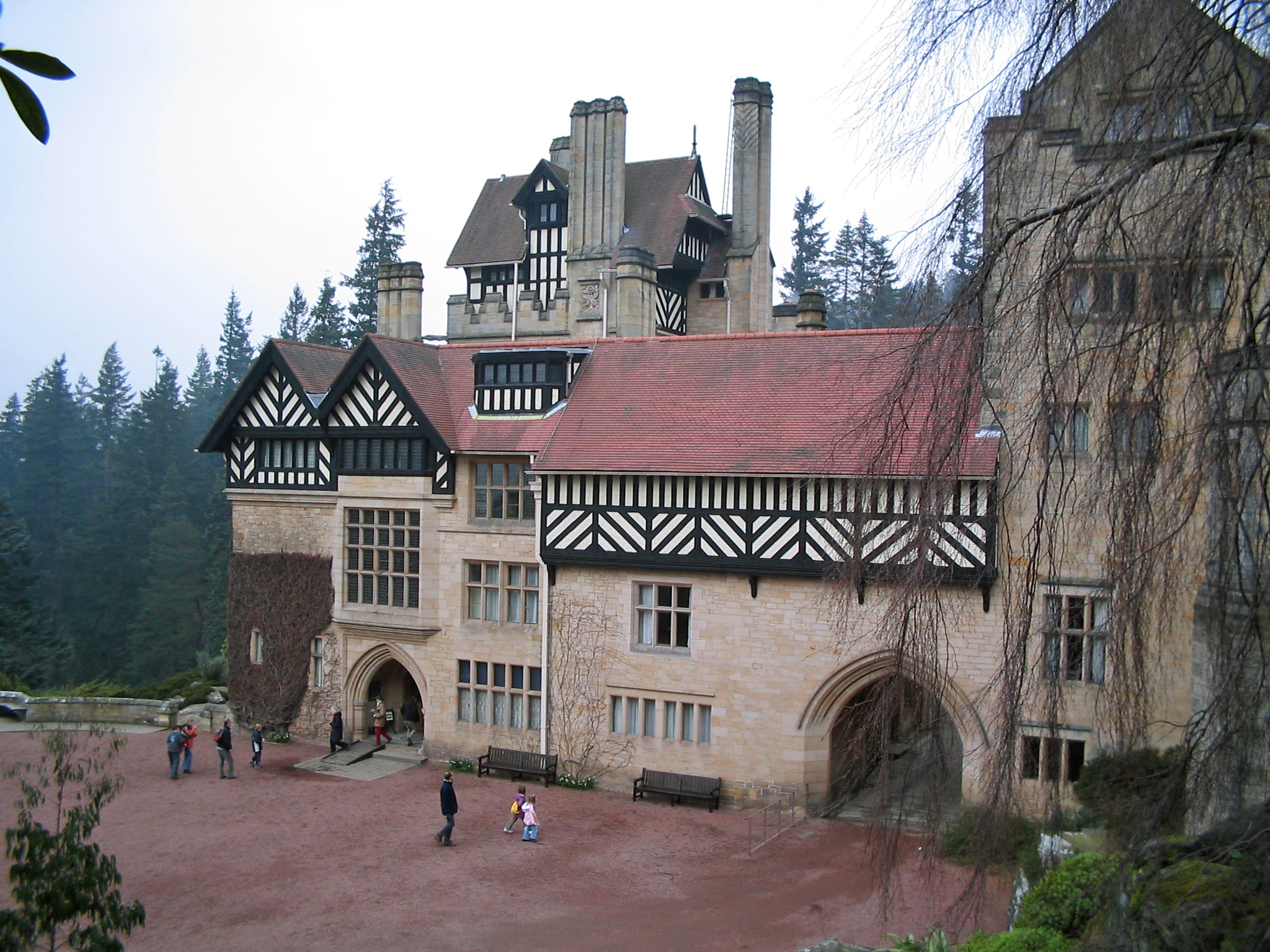
Cragside, Northumberland, 1869

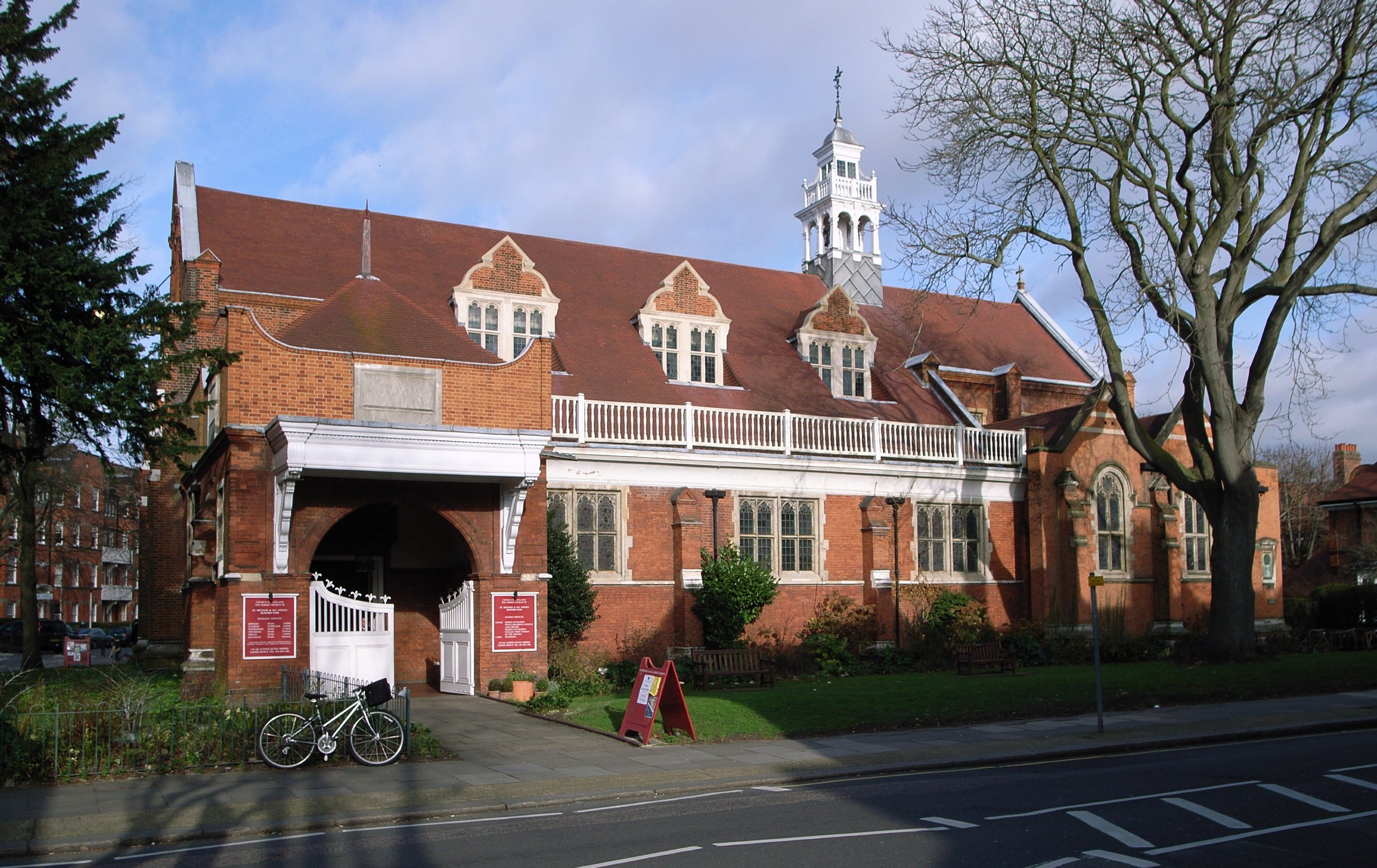
St. Michael and All Angels, Bedford Park, 1879

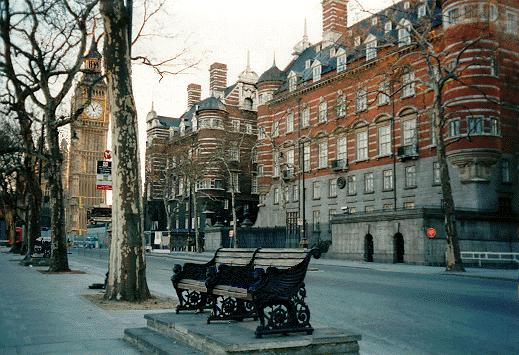
Norman Shaw Buildings, London. 1887

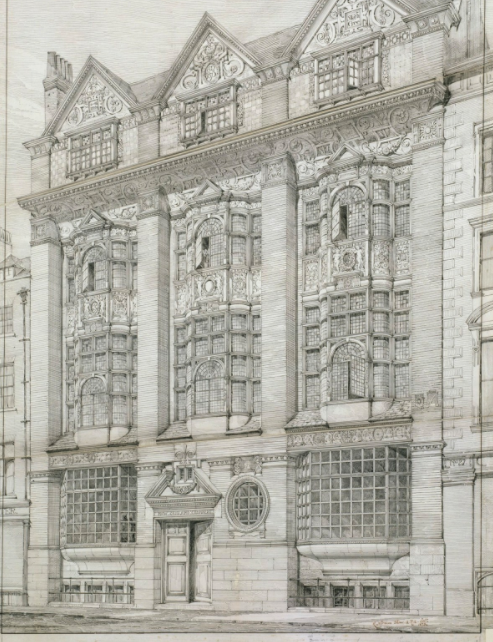
Design for New Zealand Chambers, London. 1873

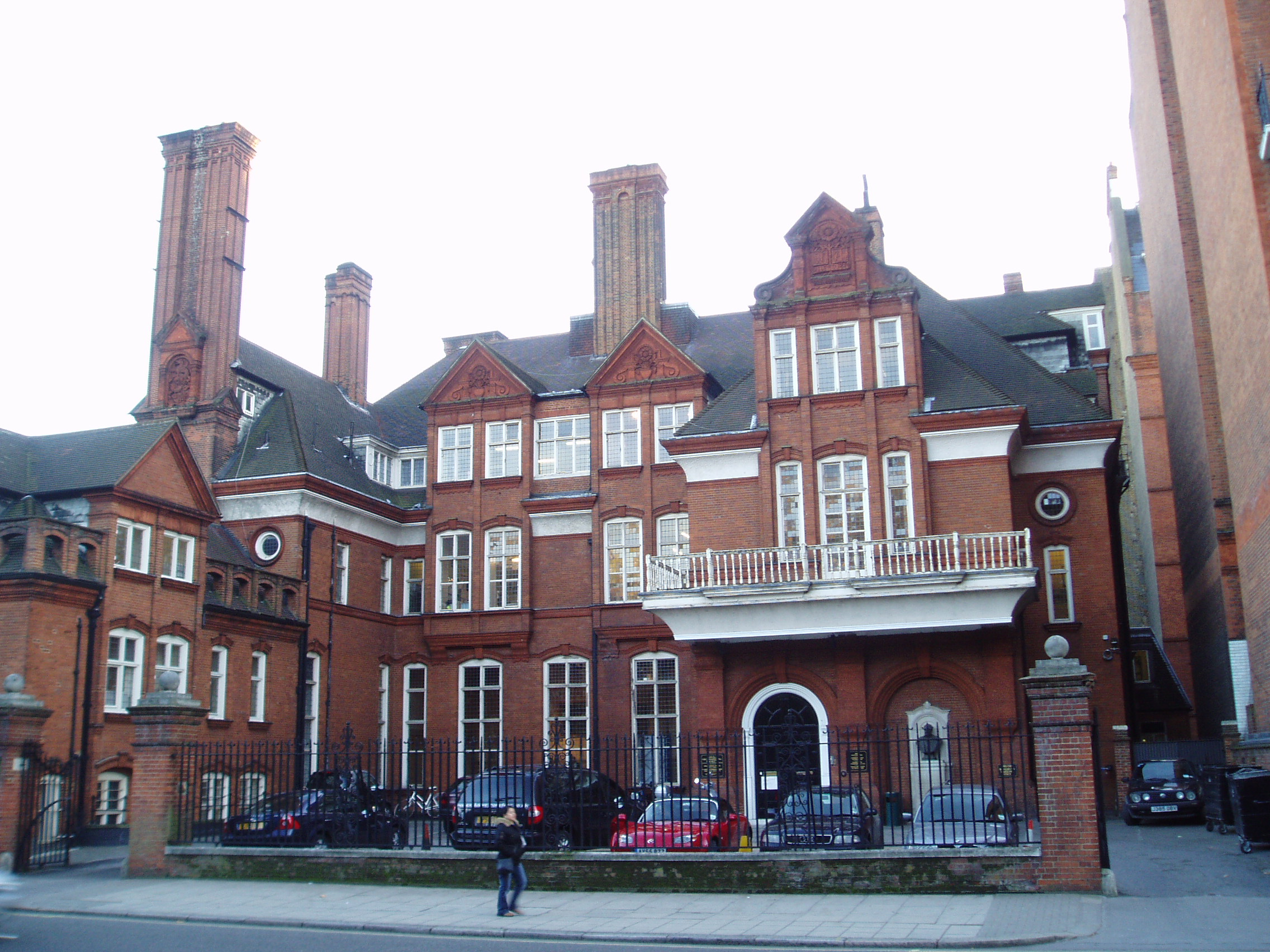
Lowther Lodge, headquarters of the Royal Geographical Society, 1873

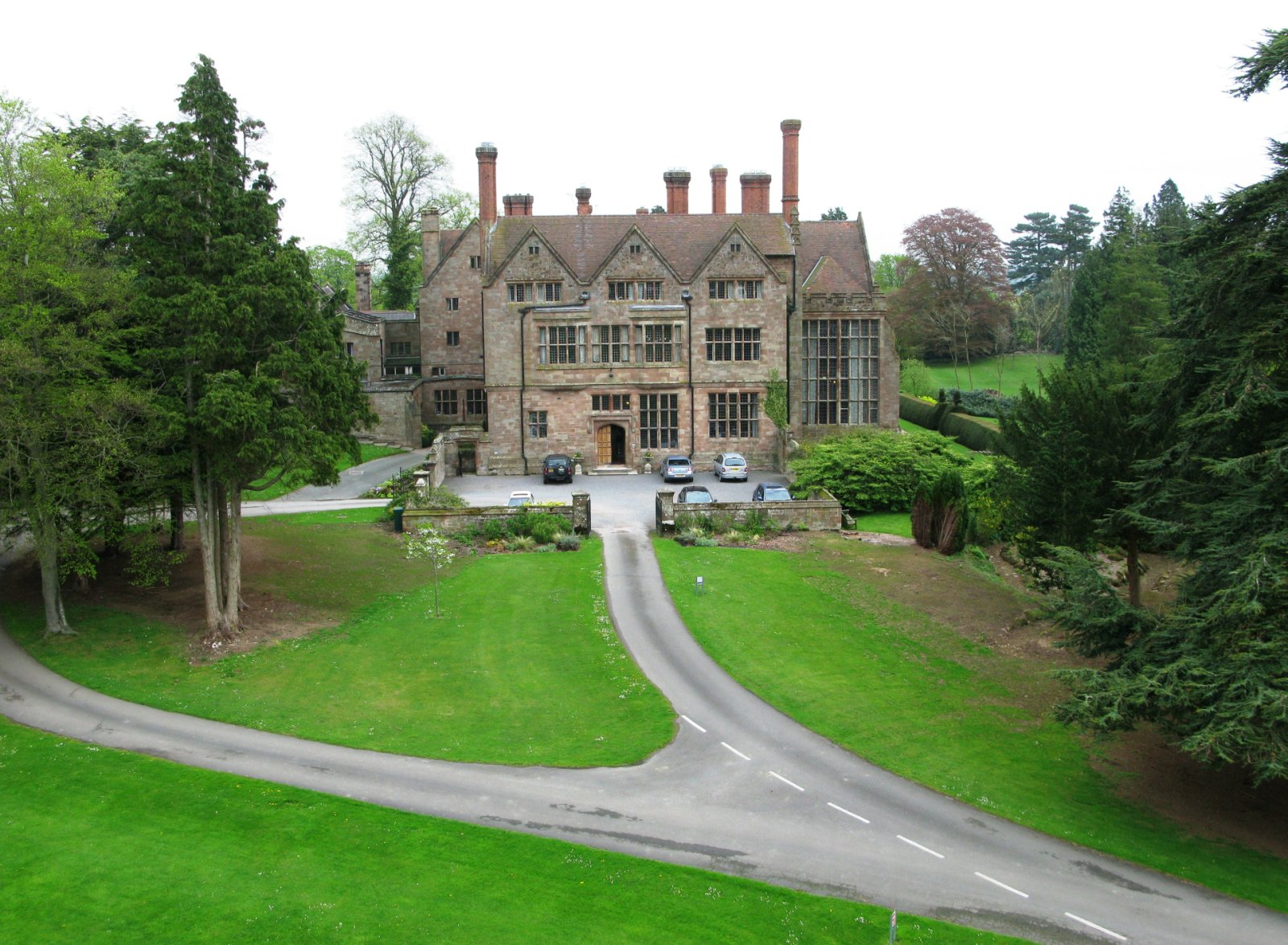
Adcote, Shropshire, 1876

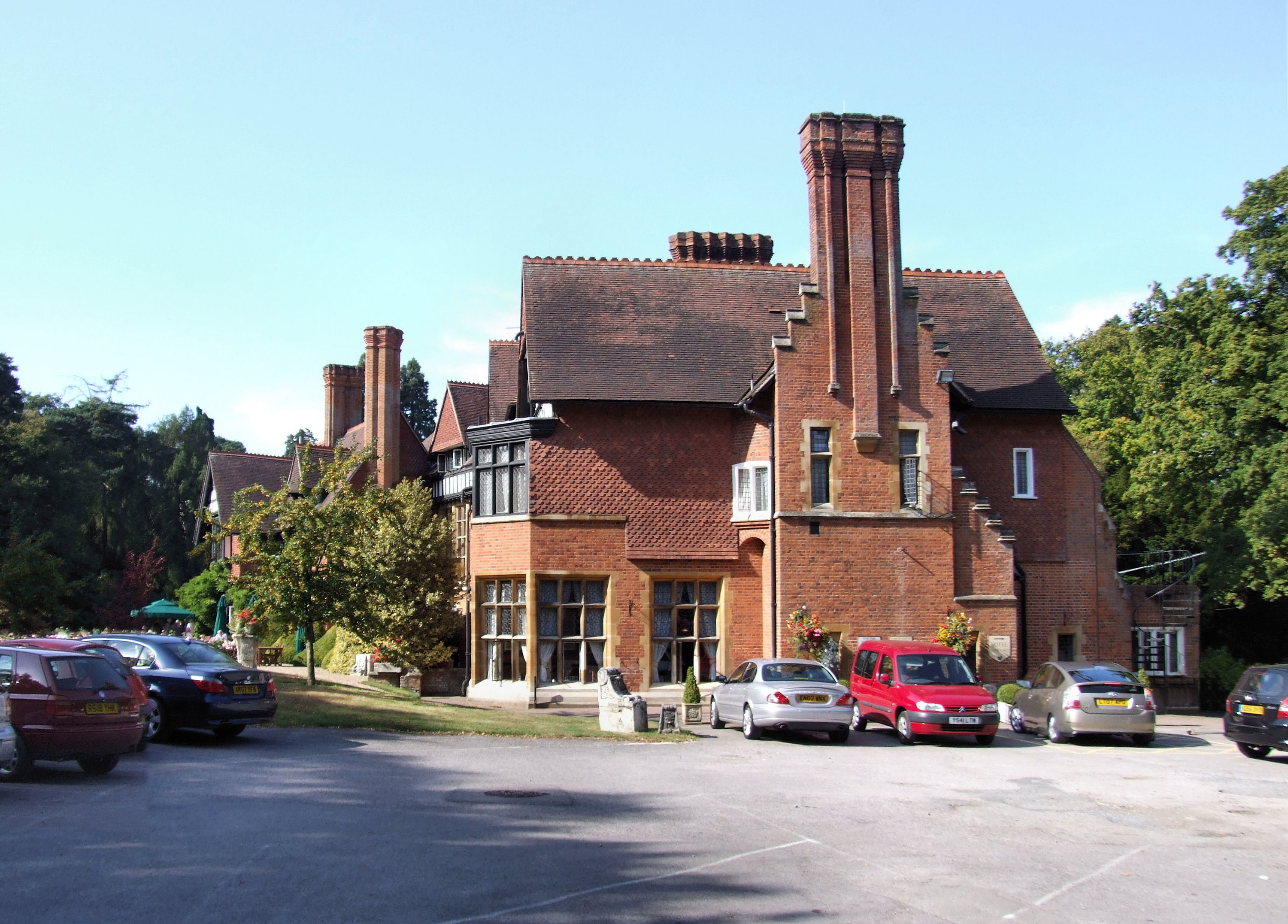
Grim's Dyke, Harrow, London, 1870

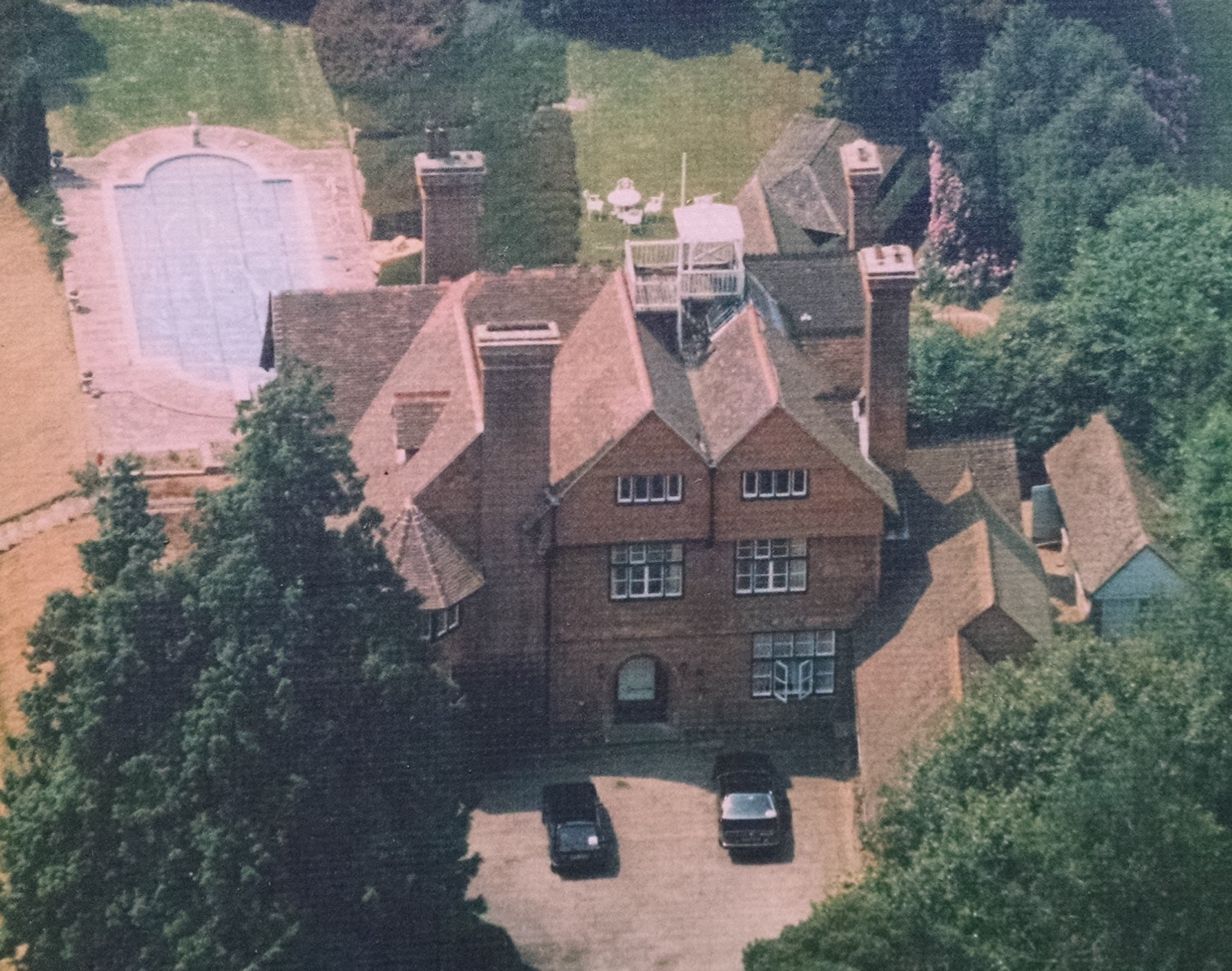
Hillside, Groombridge 1871

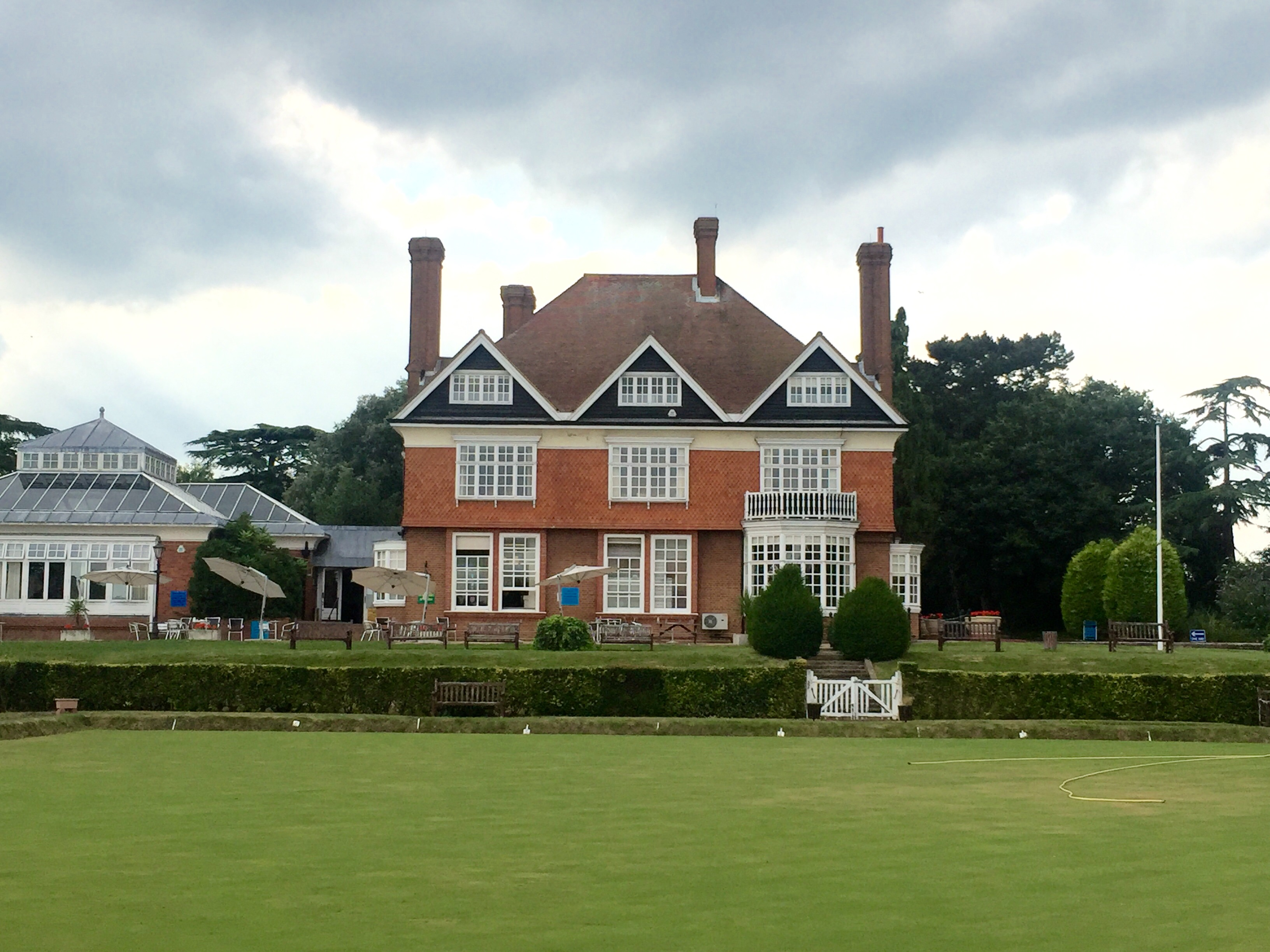
Chigwell Hall, Essex, 1876

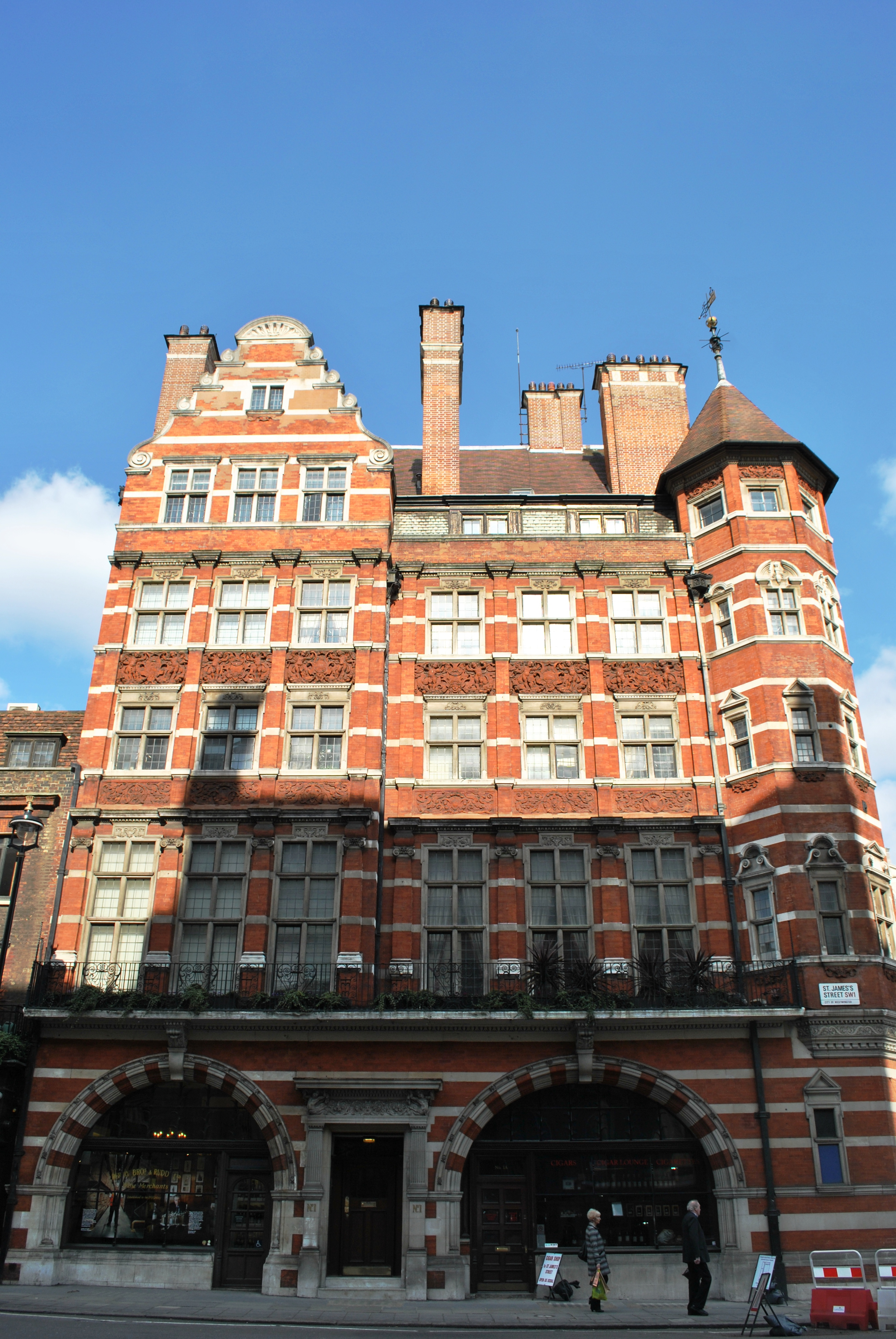
1–2 St. James Street, London, 1882–83

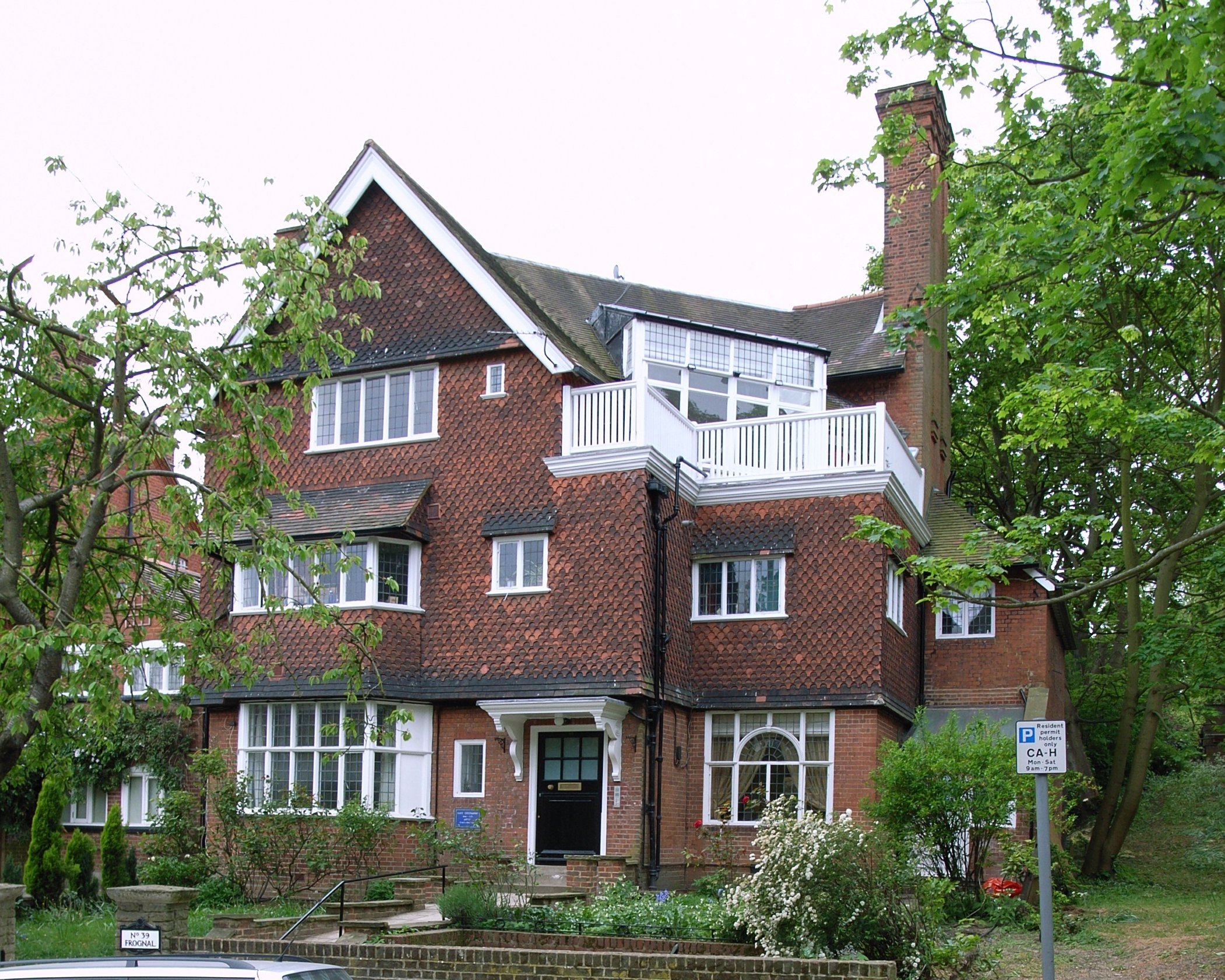
House for Kate Greenaway in Frognal, 1885

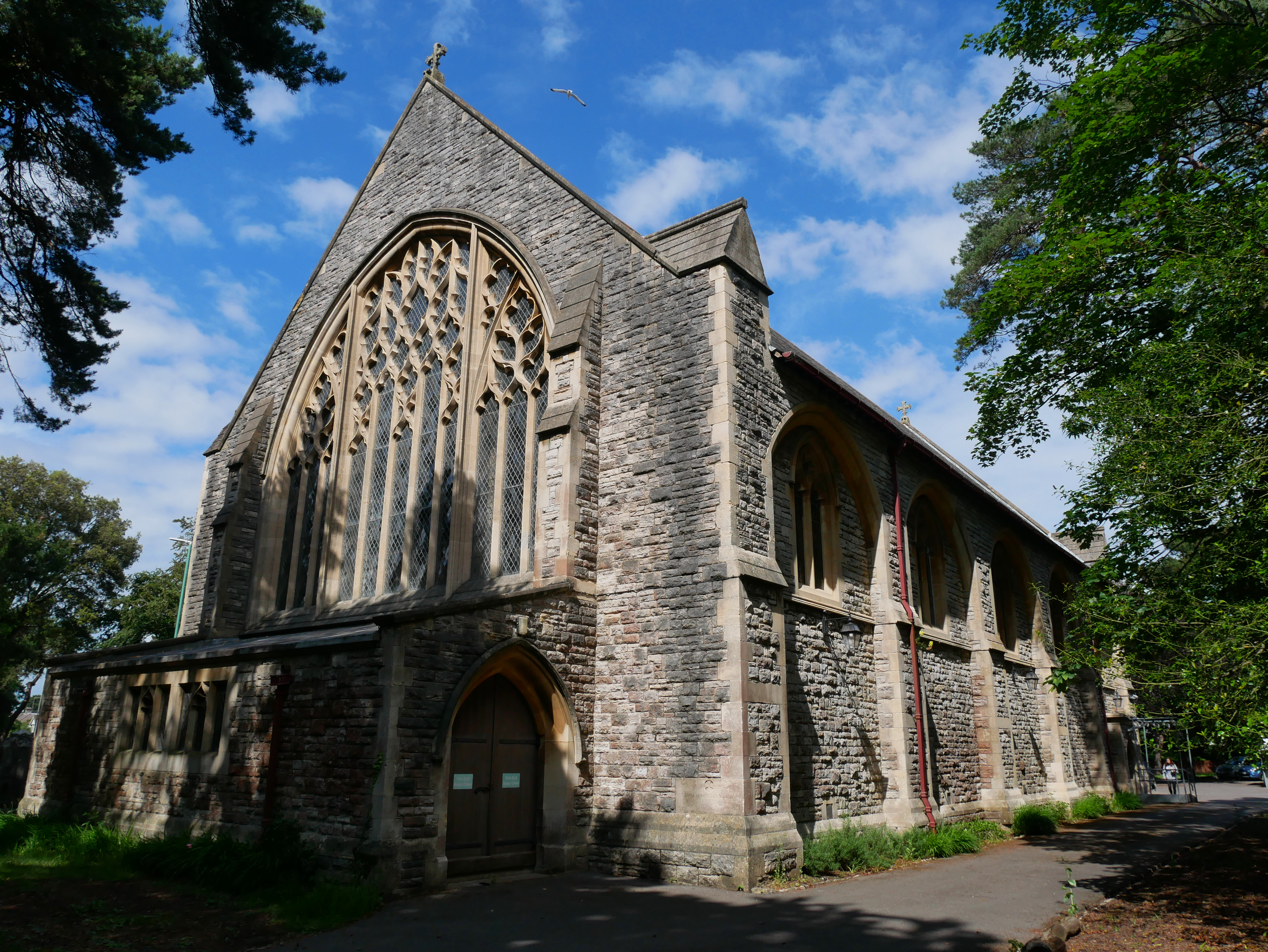
St Swithun's Church, Bournemouth, 1877

== See also ==
- The English House
- Richmond Plantation

== Sources ==
- T. Affleck Greeves, "Bedford Park the first garden suburb". Anne Bingley, 1975. ISBN 0851575145.
- Andrew Saint, Richard Norman Shaw, revised edition, 2010.ISBN 978-0-300-15526-6.
- Hitchcock, Henry-Russell. Architecture: Nineteenth and Twentieth Centuries. 2nd ed. Baltimore: Penguin Books, 1963. ISBN 9781258016258
- Jones, Edward, & Christopher Woodward. A Guide to the Architecture of London. 2nd ed. London: Weidenfeld & Nicolson, 1992 ISBN 9781780224930
- Norman Shaw's Letters: A Selection, Architectural History, Vol. 18 (1975), pp. 60–85, Published by: SAHGB Publications Limited, DOI: 10.2307/1568382
