= St Swithun's Church, Bournemouth =

Church in Dorset, England

St Swithun's Church
- LOVECHURCH Bournemouth
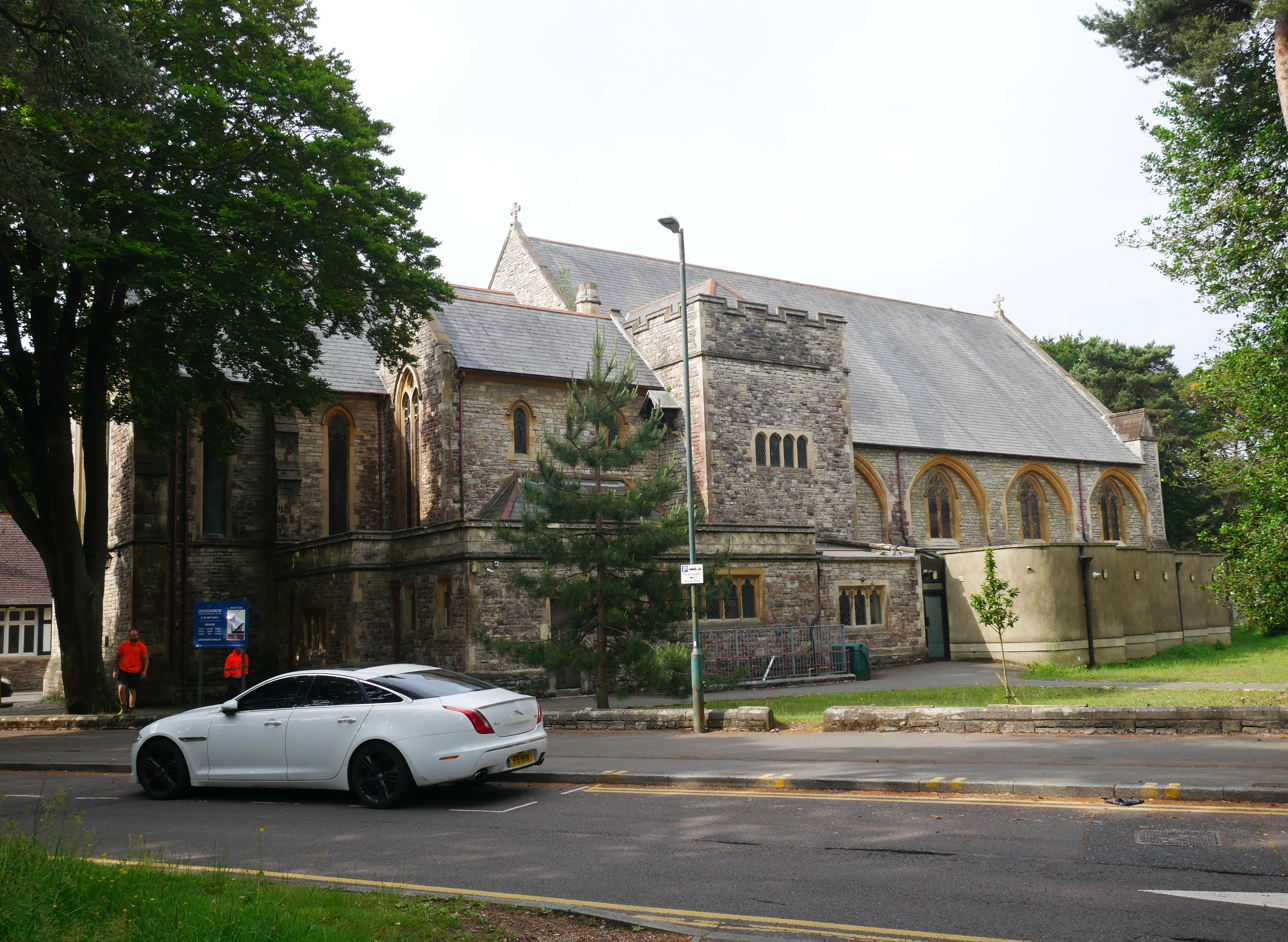
- View of the church from the north-east

- Location within Dorset
- 50°43′16″N 1°51′38″W
- Location: Bournemouth
- Country: England
- Denomination: Church of England
- Churchmanship: Charismatic Evangelical
- Website: lovechurch.org.uk

History
- Status: Parish church
- Founded: 1876
- Dedication: St Swithun
- Dedicated: 1892

Architecture
- Functional status: active
- Heritage designation: Grade II listed
- Designated: 1 August 1974

Administration
- Diocese: Winchester
- Archdeaconry: Bournemouth

St Swithun's Church is a Grade II listed church in the town of Bournemouth, England.

== History ==
The church was a product of the Revd. Alexander Morden Bennett's long campaign of High Anglican church building in Bournemouth, beginning in 1851 with his own church of St. Peter, the mother church of St Swithun. Together with St. Michael's Church, St. Swithun's was one of the town centre's churches to be designed by Richard Norman Shaw. The chancel was built from 1876 to 1877 and the nave was between 1891 and 1892. Other parts of the church such as the vestries were added c. 1913 by H. E Hawker, a local architect.

On 1 August 1974, the church was designated a grade II listed building.

By the 1990s the church was disused and deteriorating; most fittings were removed by the Diocese of Winchester before 1999. At that date it was leased by Bournemouth Family Church (later, Citygate Church), an independent evangelical organisation which later bought the building. The interior was re-floored, with additions built to the north, the remaining fittings moved to the sanctuary and the orientation reversed.

In 2014, St Swithun's returned to use as an Anglican church, when it was purchased as the site of a church plant in the Charismatic Evangelical HTB Church network. The plant was later rebranded as Lovechurch and further planted to two other churches in Bournemouth, but the name St. Swithun's is still referenced as the site name.

In October 2020, the church received a government grant in support of the church's work in the community during the COVID-19 pandemic.

== Gallery ==
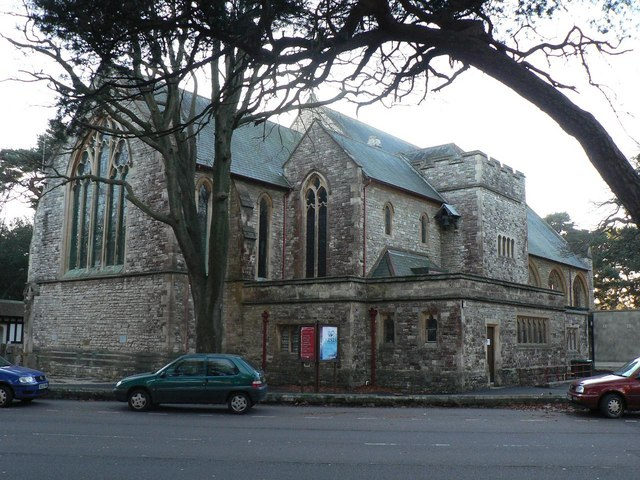
The church seen from the northeast from Manor Road.

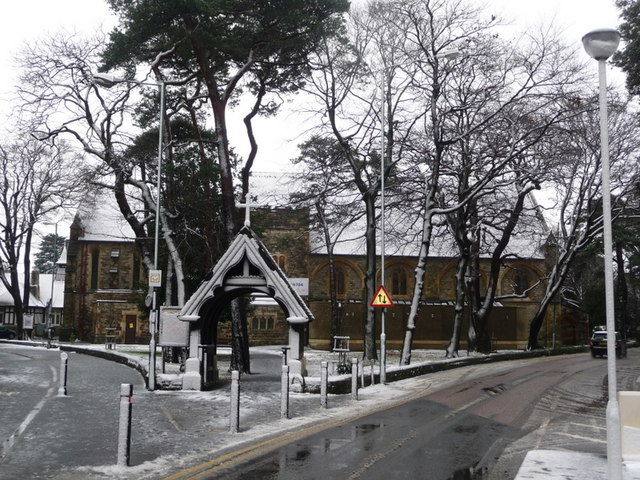
St. Swithun's church in snow.

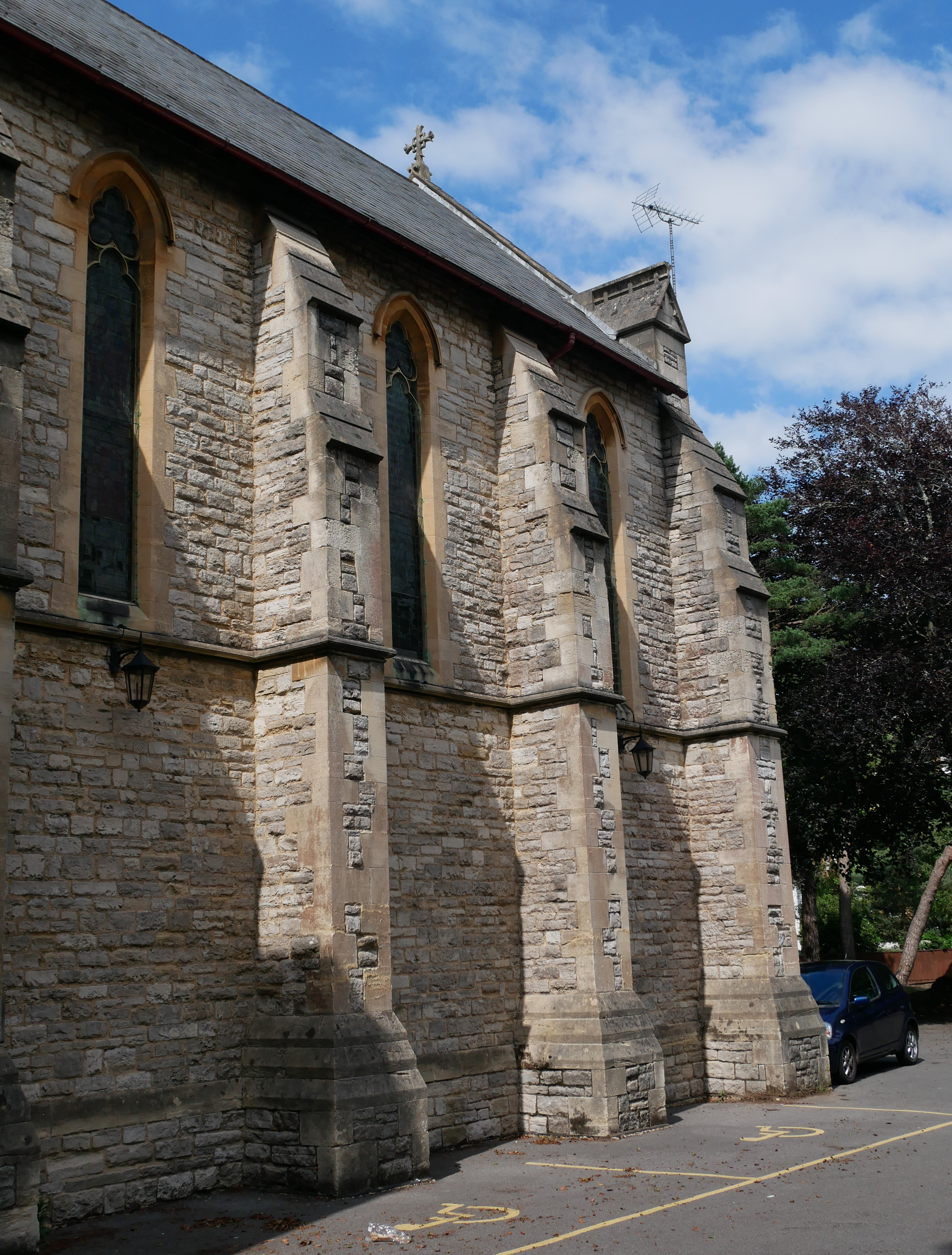
South Face of the Church.

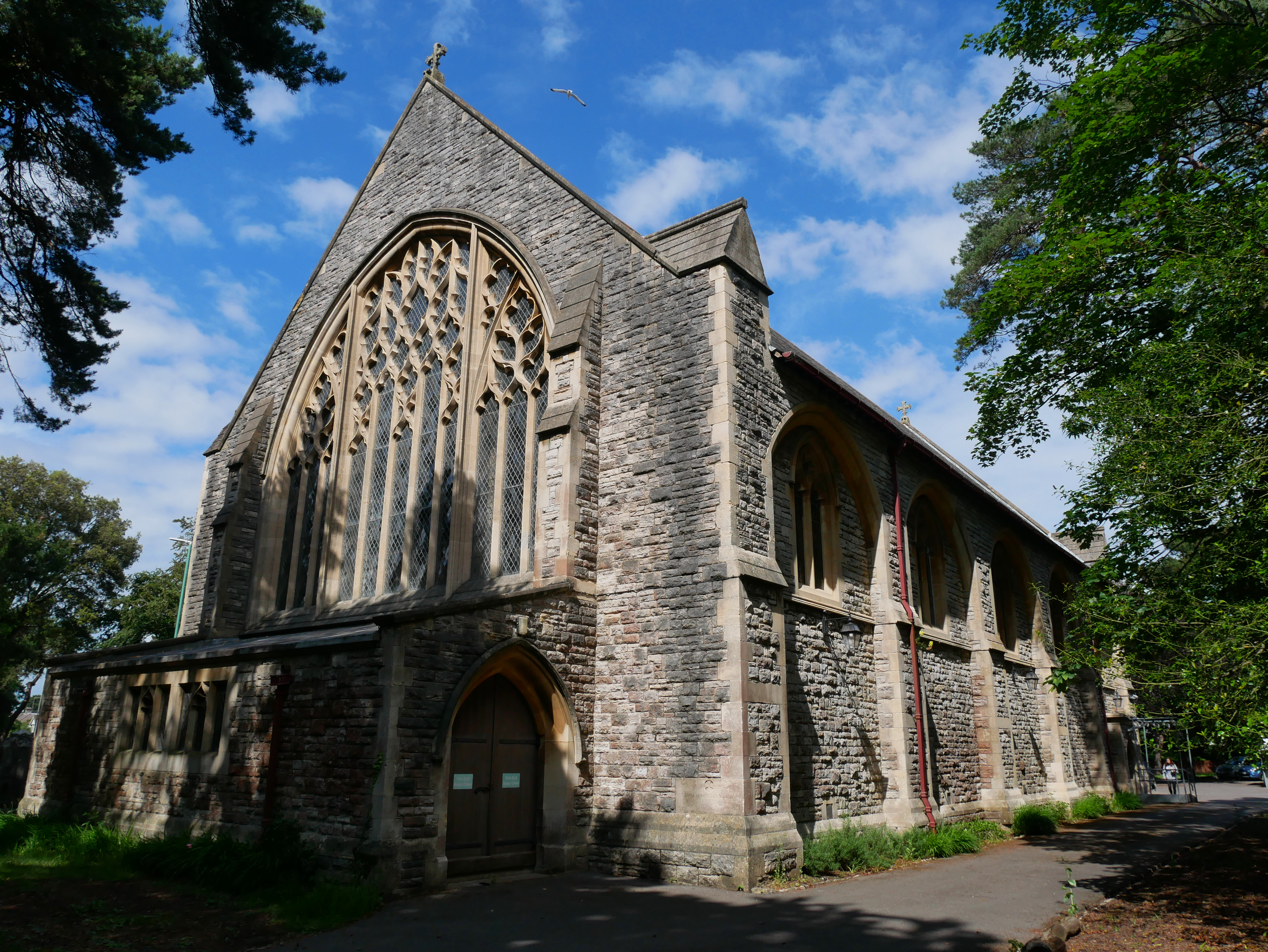
Southwest View of the Church.

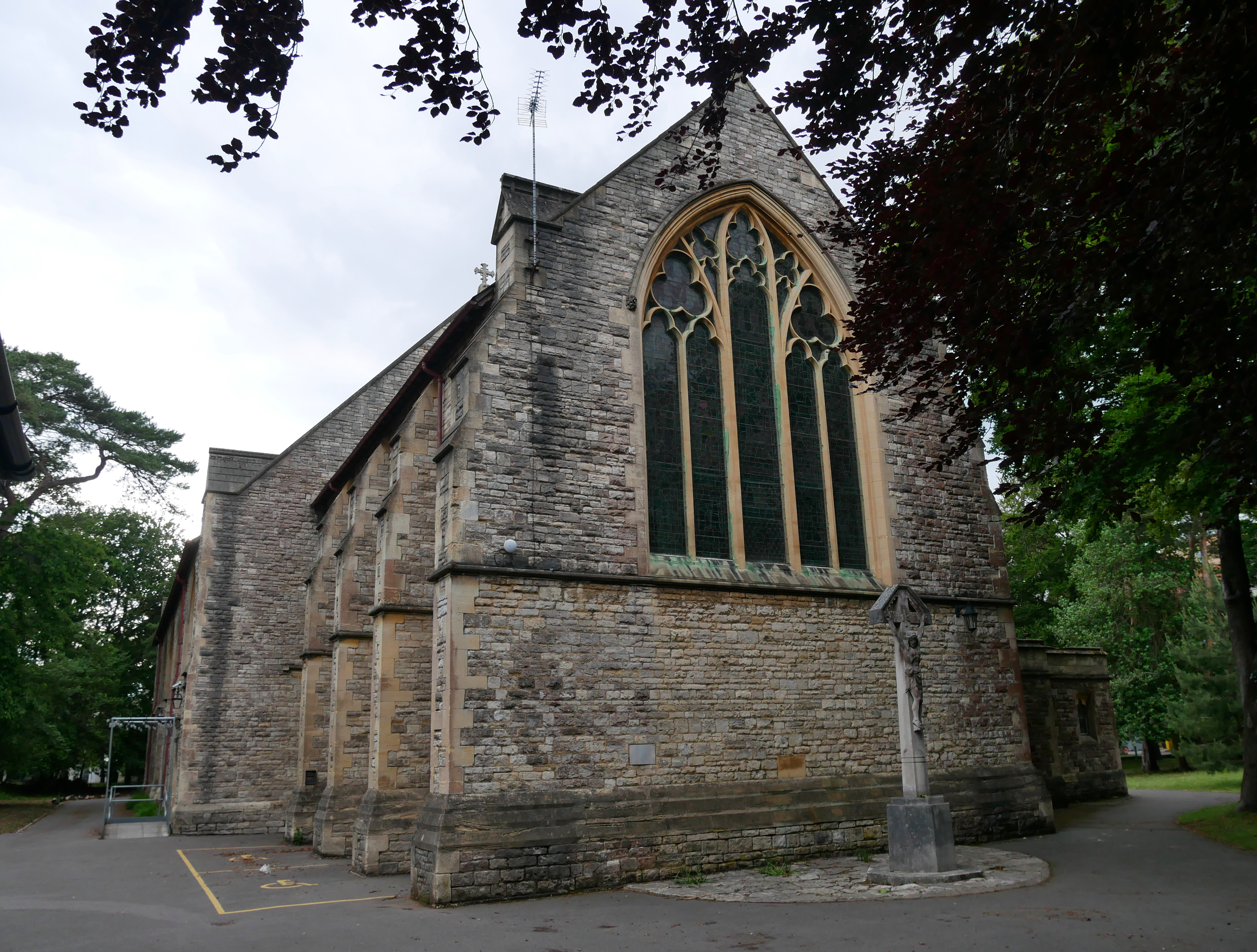
East Face of the Church of Saint Swithun.

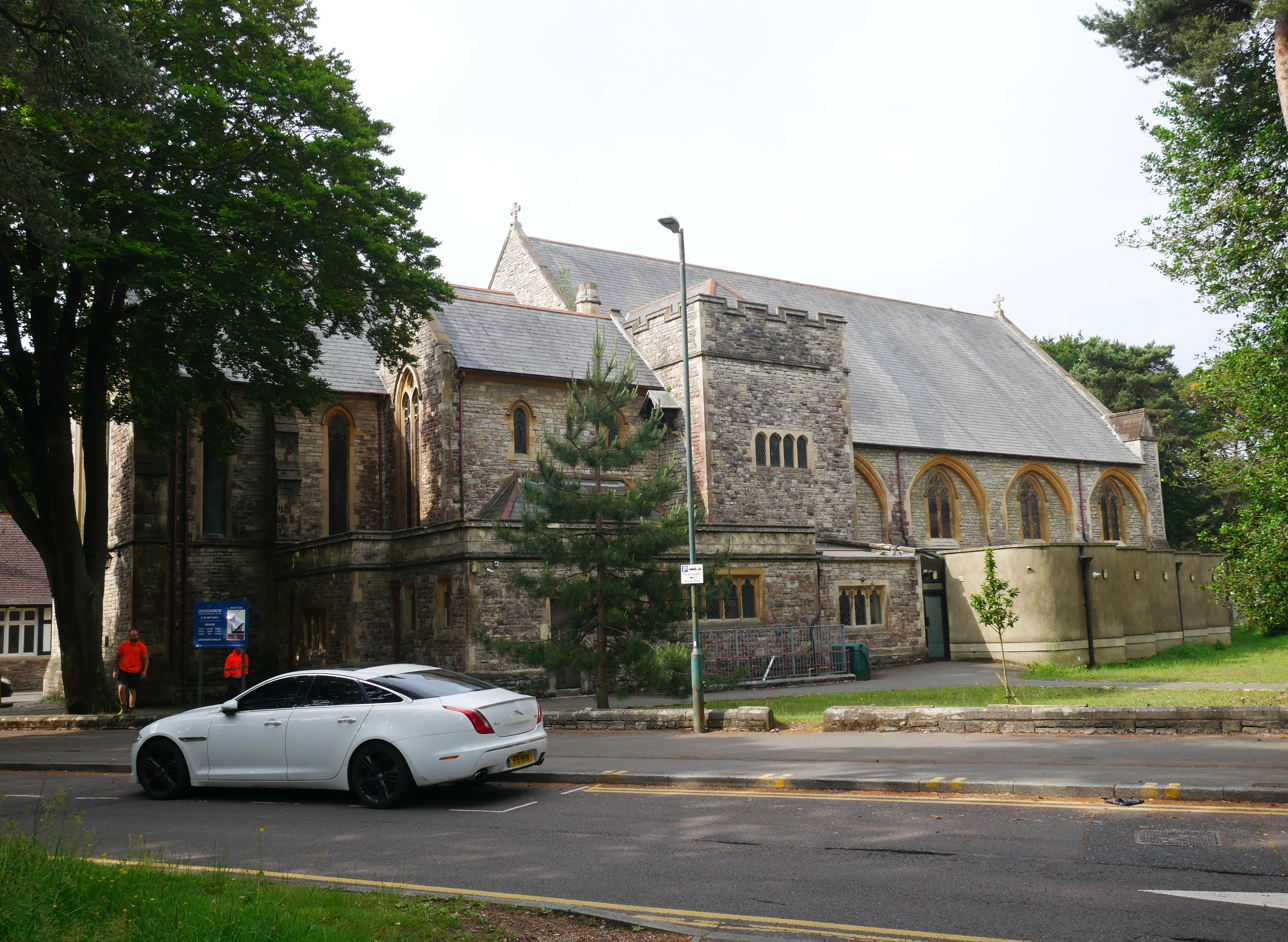
Northeast View of the Church.

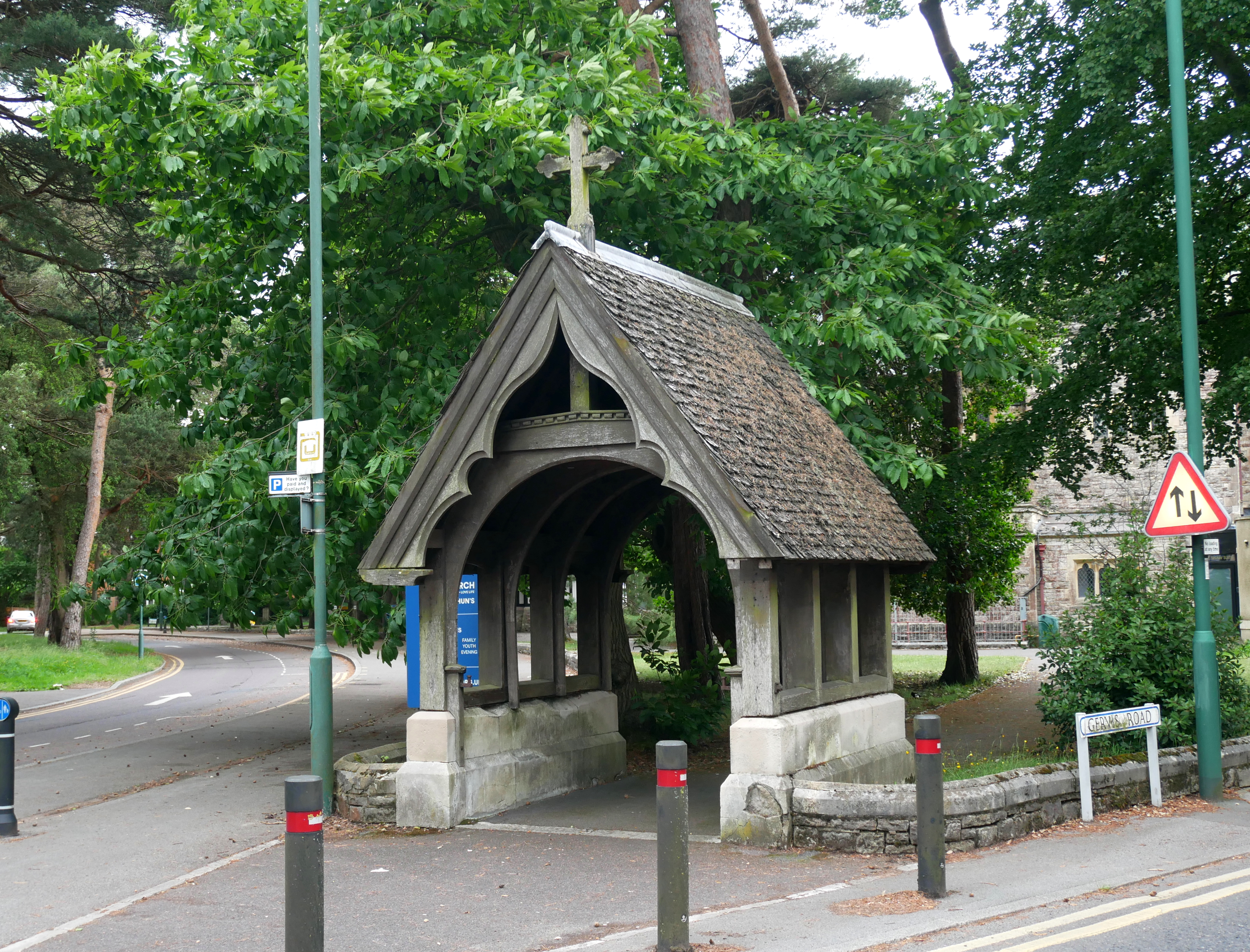
Lychgate of the Church.

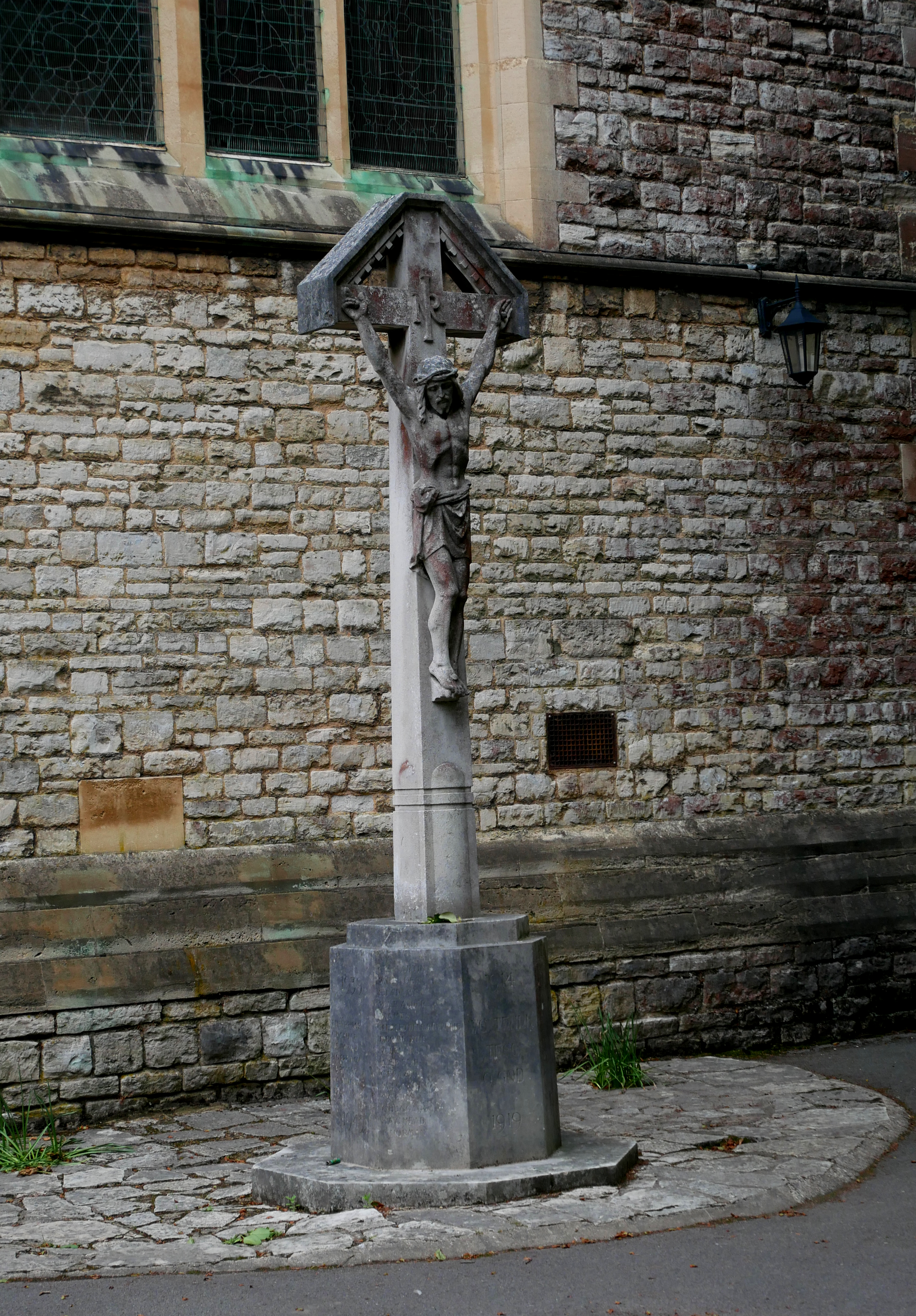
The war memorial outside the church.

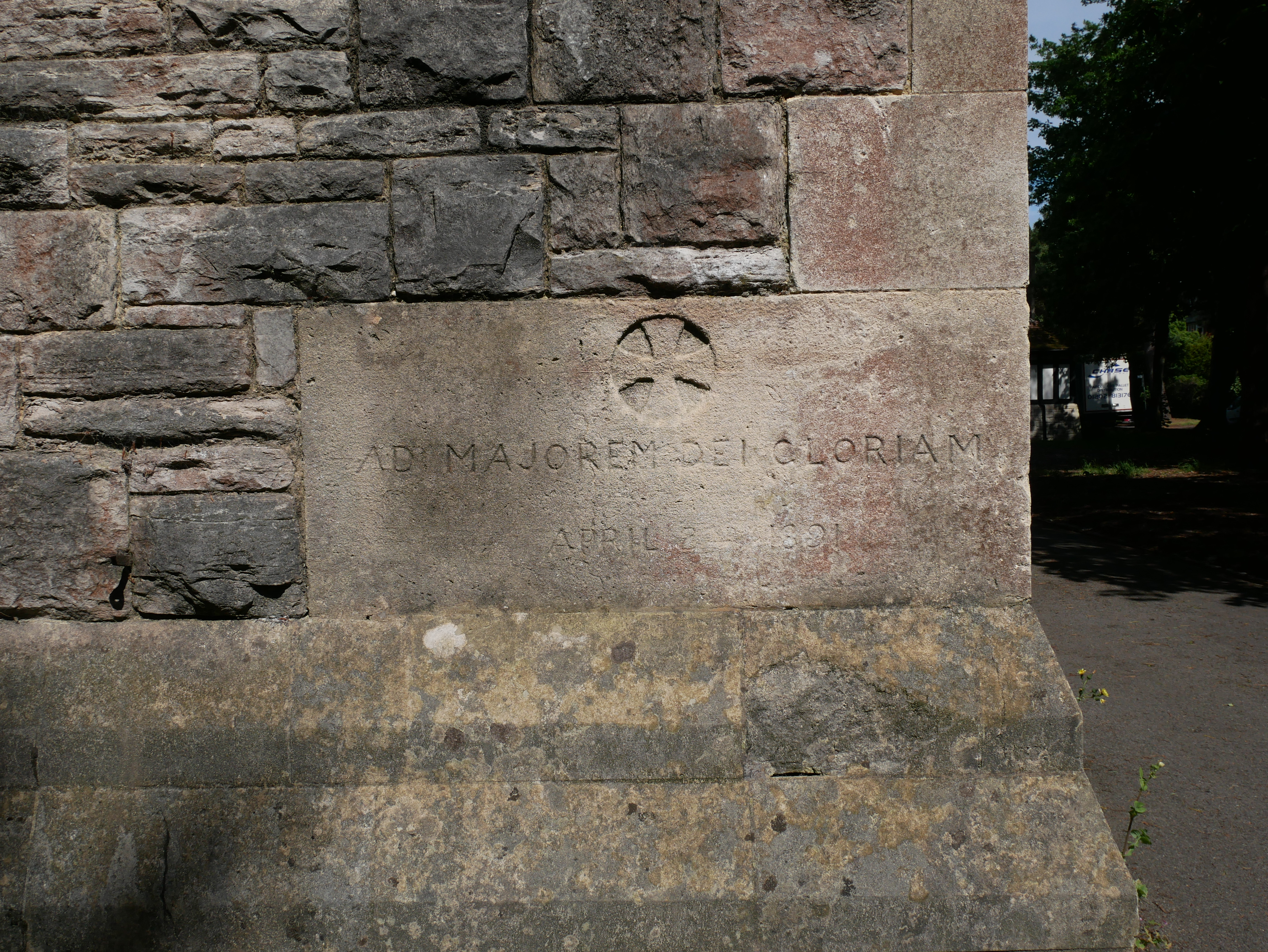
Epigraph on the West Face of the Church.

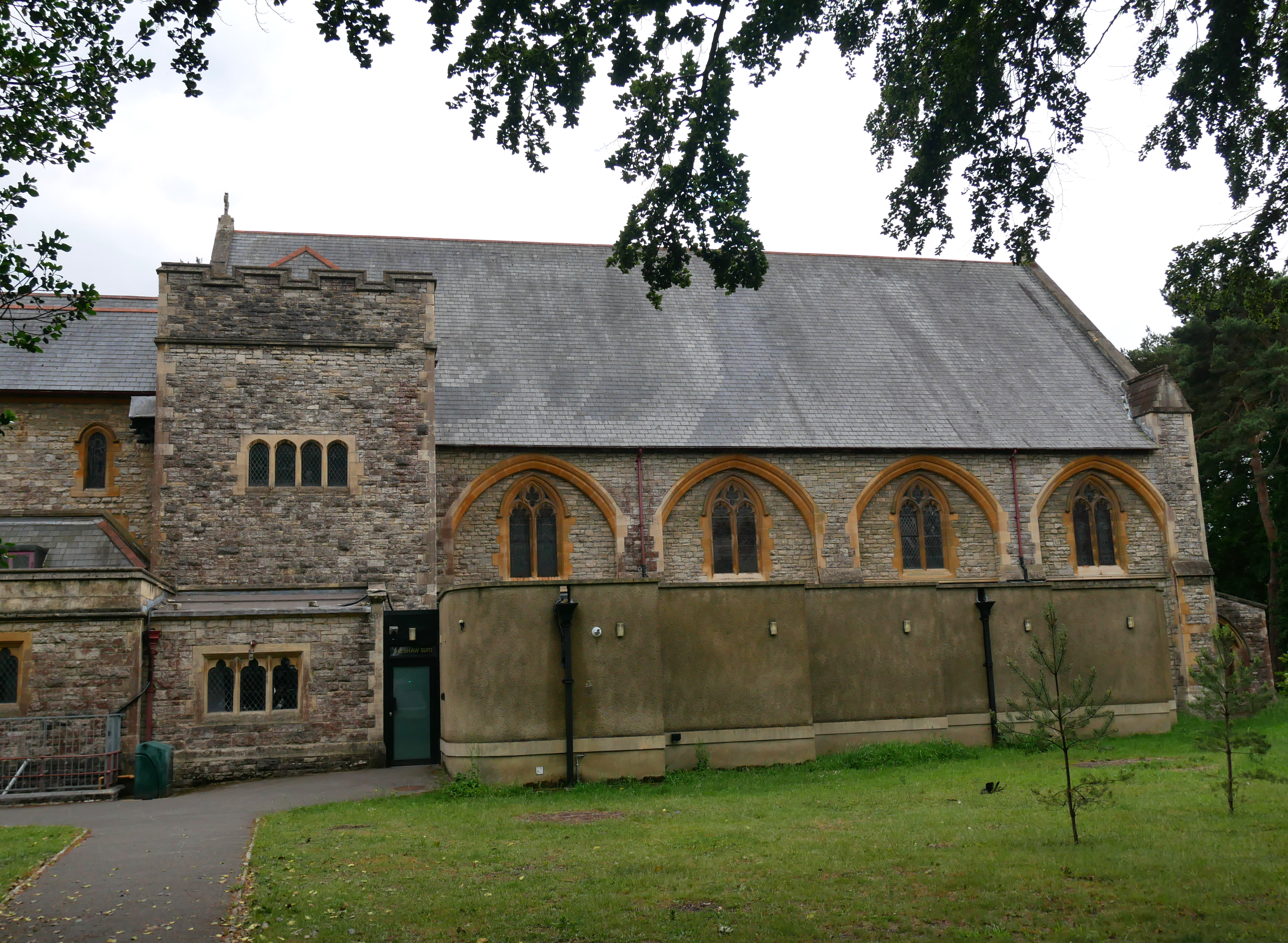
North Face of the Church.

== See also ==
- List of churches in Bournemouth
