= Savills =

Real estate services provider

Savills plc
- Type: Public limited company
- Traded as: LSE: SVS; FTSE 250 component
- Industry: Real estate
- Founded: 1855; 171 years ago
- Headquarters: 33 Margaret Street, London, W1G 0JD
- Key people: Stacey Cartwright (Chairperson); Simon Shaw (CEO)
- Revenue: ▲£2,550.9 million (2025)
- Operating income: ▲£93.5 million (2025)
- Net income: ▲£73.6 million (2025)
- Website: savills.com

Savills plc is a British multinational real estate services company based in London. It is listed on the London Stock Exchange and is a constituent of the FTSE 250 Index.

== History ==
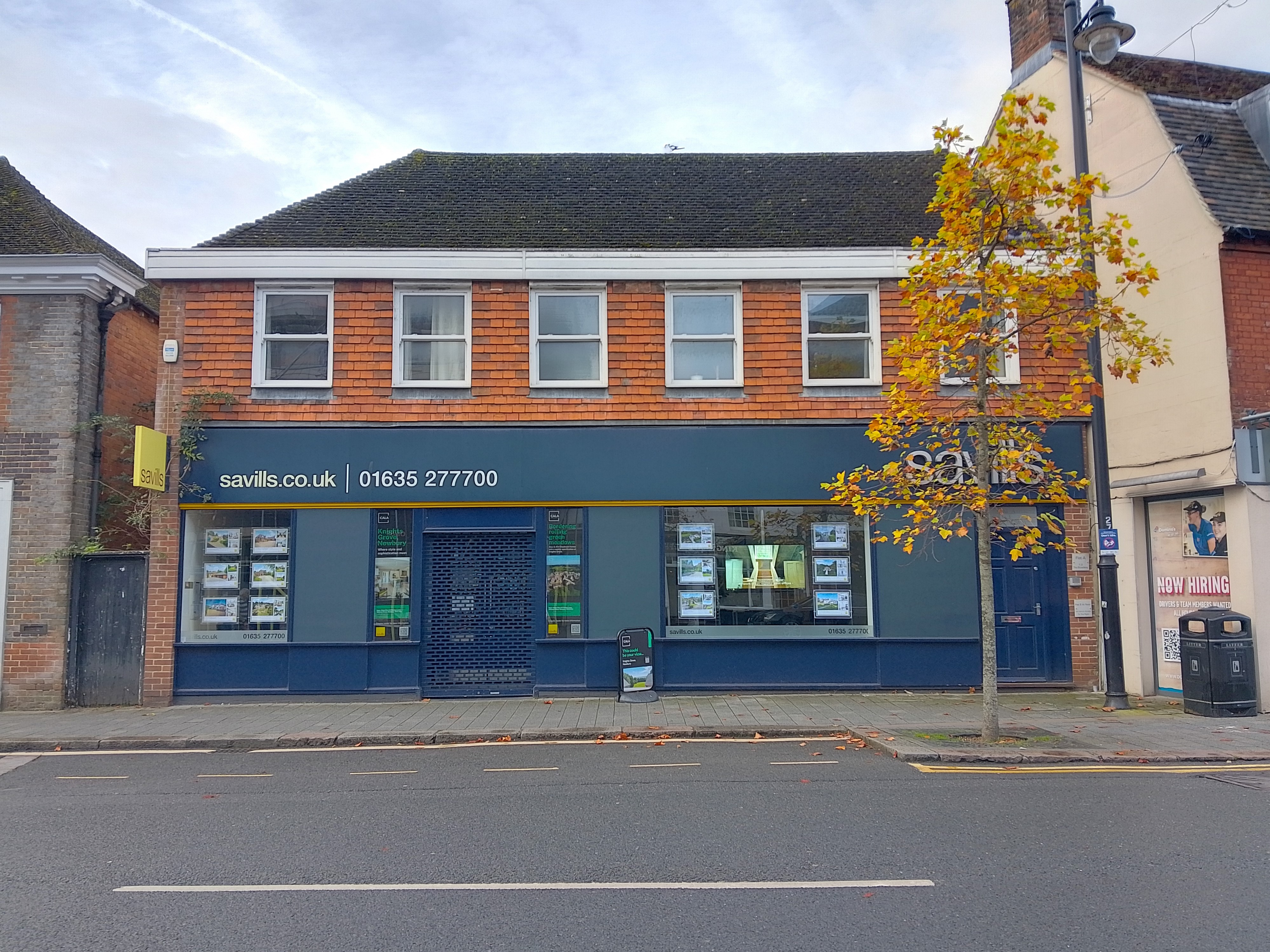
Branch in Newbury, UK

The business was established by Alfred Savill (1829–1905) in 1855 in London. By the time of Alfred Savill's death in 1905 his sons Alfred, Edwin and Norman were established in partnership. In the 1920s the firm moved to Lincoln's Inn Fields. During the Second World War Norman Savill went to Wimborne in Dorset, taking vital records with him. The remaining partners stayed at Lincoln's Inn Field. By the 1970s, the firm was re-branded as Savills. The firm was incorporated as a limited company in 1987 and was listed on the London Stock Exchange in 1988.

In 1997, Savills merged with First Pacific Davies (Chinese: 第一太平戴維斯) in Asia. In 1998 it bought majority stakes in the German, French and Spanish arms of Weatherall, Green & Smith.

Seeking to establish the firm in North America, Savills announced its acquisition of New York-based Studley in June 2014, bringing the commercial tenant representation brokerage into Savills. In June 2015, it completed the acquisition of Smiths Gore, provider of rural and residential property services in the UK. In June 2016, Savills plc announced its proprietary investment subsidiary, Grosvenor Hill Ventures, had acquired a minority stake in Yopa Property, a UK-based online hybrid estate agent.

Savills announced in August 2016 that it had acquired GBR Phoenix Beard, a Midlands-based commercial property consultancy, strengthening its UK real estate services. Expansion continued in July 2017, with the acquisition of Larry Smith Italia, a commercial management and leasing business in Italy. The company's European operations grew further in December 2017 when Savills acquired Aguirre Newman S.A., the independent Spanish and Portuguese real estate advisory; the newly combined business was rebranded as Savills Aguirre Newman in January 2018.

In November 2025, Savills was appointed by Expo City Dubai to manage leasing and commercial asset management for the district. In March 2026, Savills announced its acquisition of Eastdil Secured for $1.11 billion, adding especially to Savills' North American footprint.

== Operations ==
The company provides property consulting services from offices throughout the Americas, Europe, Asia Pacific, and Middle East.

== See also ==
- Jones Lang LaSalle
- Knight Frank
- Foxtons
