= Keighley (disambiguation) =

Keighley is a town and civil parish within the metropolitan borough of the City of Bradford in West Yorkshire, England.

Keighley may also refer to:

== Topics associated with Keighley, Yorkshire ==
Elections

- Keighley Central, an electoral ward
- Keighley East, an electoral ward
- Keighley (UK Parliament constituency)
  - 1911 Keighley by-election
  - 1913 Keighley by-election
  - 1915 Keighley by-election
  - 1918 Keighley by-election
  - 1942 Keighley by-election
- Keighley West, an electoral ward

Sport

- Keighley Cougars, a professional rugby league club
- Keighley RUFC, a rugby union club

Transport

- Keighley and Kendal Turnpike, a former turnpike road
- Keighley & Worth Valley Railway, a heritage railway line which connects to the national rail network at Keighley railway station
  - Rolling stock of the Keighley & Worth Valley Railway
- Keighley Bus Company
- Keighley bus station
- Keighley Corporation Tramways (defunct)
- Keighley railway station
- Keighley Tramways Company (defunct)

Other uses

- Keighley and District Local History Society
- Keighley Festival, an annual event
- Keighley News, a newspaper
- Keighley Picture House, a cinema
- Keighley sex gang, the defendants in a criminal case

== Other places ==
- Keighley, Kansas, an unincorporated community in U.S.A.

== People ==
- Brian Keighley (1948–2015), Scottish physician
- Geoff Keighley (born 1978), Canadian video game journalist and television presenter
- Geoffrey Keighley (1925–2005), English barrister, businessman, first-class cricketer, farmer, grazier and legislator
- Henry de Keighley (fl. 1297-1301), English politician
- William Keighley (1889–1984), American stage actor and Hollywood film director
