= Arthur Poulter =

Arthur Poulter VC
- Arthur Poulter, VC
- Born: 16 December 1893; East Witton, North Yorkshire
- Died: 29 August 1956 (aged 62); Leeds, West Yorkshire
- Burial place: New Wortley Cemetery, Leeds
- Military career
- Allegiance: United Kingdom
- Branch: British Army
- Service years: 1916 - 1919
- Rank: Private
- Units: Duke of Wellington's (West Riding) Regiment
- Conflicts: World War I
- Awards: Victoria Cross

Arthur Poulter VC (16 December 1893 – 29 August 1956) was an English recipient of the Victoria Cross, the highest and most prestigious award for gallantry in the face of the enemy that can be awarded to British and Commonwealth forces.

== Details ==
Poulter was 24 years old, and a private in the 1/4th Battalion, Duke of Wellington's (West Riding) Regiment, British Army during the First World War when the following deed took place for which he was awarded the VC.

On 10 April 1918, during Operation Georgette, the German II Bavarian Corps put pressure on 34 Division holding the salient around Armentieres. From 7.00am and through the morning, the Bavarians renewed their fierce attacks against 101 Brigade (plus the 11 Suffolks of 121 Brigade) that were holding the Fort Rompu-Erquinghem-Lys-Bois Grenier line. Although they broke through the British defences enough troops were scratched together to make a counter-attack that drove them out again. Although 101 Brigade was reinforced by 1/4 Duke of Wellingtons of 147 Brigade, 49 (West Riding) Division, 3rd Australian Tunnelling Company and F Special (Gas) Company of the Royal Engineers, their difficult tactical position and the numerical superior enemy put the Bavarians on the western edge of Erquinghem-Lys. A fierce rear guard action prevented the destruction of 101 Brigade. Orders to evacuate Armentieres were issued at 1050 hours but with communications cut, it was not until the afternoon that a fighting withdrawal could begin. Street fighting took place in the town held by the British since 1914. Fewer and fewer bridges remained. 102 Brigade, having received the orders first, crossed its entire force to the north side of the Lys by 6.20pm to defend Nieppe. 101 Brigade, the most heavily engaged unit, crossed the river but the 18/Northumberland Fusiliers and 1/4 Duke of Wellingtons took casualties. The Duke's found themselves on the wrong side of the river and surrounded with no bridges left to cross. It was in this context that no. 24066 Private Arthur Poulter of the Duke's won his Victoria Cross.

On 10 April 1918 at Erquinghem-Lys, France, Private Poulter, who was acting as a stretcher-bearer, on 10 occasions carried badly wounded men on his back through particularly heavy artillery and machine-gun fire. Two of the wounded were hit a second time whilst on his back. Again, after a withdrawal over the river had been ordered, Private Poulter returned in full view of the enemy and carried back another man who had been left behind wounded. He bandaged 40 men under fire and was seriously wounded when attempting another rescue in the face of the enemy.

== Further information ==
- Before the war he was employed at the Timothy Taylor Brewery, Keighley, West Yorkshire.
- The Town of Erquinghem-Lys, France has erected a memorial to Pte Poulter, next to the railway line. In 2005 the keys to the town were presented to the Duke of Wellington's Regiment (West Riding).

== The medal ==
His Victoria Cross was donated, by his family (18 August 1999), to the Duke of Wellington's Regimental Museum in Bankfield Museum, Halifax, West Yorkshire, England where it was on public display. The medal is now in a safe place; a replica is currently on display following an attempted burglary at the museum.

== Bibliography ==
- Gliddon, Gerald (2013) [2004]. Spring Offensive 1918. VCs of the First World War. The History Press. ISBN 978-0-7524-8730-4.
