= Keighley Tramways =

Tramway in Yorkshire, England

Keighley Tramways Company

Operation
- Locale: Keighley
- Open: 8 May 1889
- Close: 21 September 1901
- Status: Closed

Infrastructure
- Track gauge: 4 ft (1,219 mm)
- Propulsion system: Horse
- Depot: South Street/Arcadia Street

Statistics
- Route length: 2.28 miles (3.67 km)

Keighley Corporation Tramways

Operation
- Locale: Keighley
- Open: 21 September 1901
- Close: 17 December 1924
- Status: Closed

Infrastructure
- Track gauge: 4 ft 8 1/2 in (1,435 mm) standard gauge
- Propulsion system: Electric
- Depot: South Street/Arcadia Street

Statistics
- Route length: 3.44 miles (5.54 km)

Keighley Tramways Company operated a tramway service in Keighley between 1889 and 1901 with horse power. The system re-opened three days later as Keighley Corporation Tramways and stayed in service until 1924 when it closed for good.

== History ==
Keighley Tramways Company constructed a horse-drawn tramway from Ingrow through Keighley to Utley. Services started on 8 May 1889 and were extended into Stockbridge. The company also plied a route from Coney Lane (where the successor company would build a power station) onto Marley Street via East Parade in the town. All services cost 1d (1 penny) and the interval of services was every 10 minutes stretching to 14 minutes on a Saturday." This service was originally single track, but after electrification, double track was installed.

The service was never financially successful. The only dividend ever paid by the company was when it was wound up in 1901.

The company sold out to Keighley Corporation and the 30 horses and 6 tramcars and other equipment were sold at auction for £804. The service continued as Keighley Corporation Tramways but electric tramcar operations did not begin until 12 October 1904, with trial runs to Ingrow taking place the week before. The hub of the system was opposite the Mechanics Institute in the town where a triangular junction was in operation to allow trams to access all three destinations from any of the routes that they were originating from.

The system from Ingrow to Utley was electrified and a branch was added to connect Keighley railway station, Victoria Park and Stockbridge some 1.2 miles (2 km) east of the town. The extension to Stockbridge was in response to the Mid Yorkshire Tramways company who had obtained powers to install a tramway between Shipley and Keighley. The Keighley company exercised their right to build the section between Stockbridge and the town and this duly opened in February 1905. During 1921, another extension was added between Ingrow and Oxenhope. This service would run on single track and pass at a designated loop for the tracks but without a passing loop in the overhead cables, which necessitated having to transfer a small receiver car between trams travelling to and from Oxenhope.

Other extensions were added to Sutton-in-Craven and Oakworth; with all the three extension branches (Sutton, Oakworth and Oxenhope) the trams were of a trackless trolleybus type that allowed extension to those towns without resorting to tracks. These employed a special system created by an Austrian company named Cedes-Stoll. The winding up of the Cedes-Stoll company during the First World War accelerated the demise of the special trackless trolleybuses, and they were withdrawn in 1926.

The new system took power from the Corporation Power Station in Coney Lane and was operated with electric trams until December 1924 when the system closed to trams. However, trolleybuses continued using the overhead wires until 1932, with trackless cars.
