= Carlton Keighley =

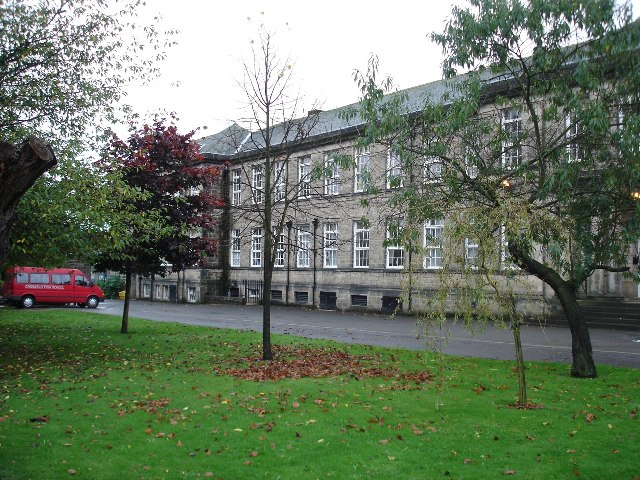

Location
- Green Head Road; Utley; Keighley, West Yorkshire, BD20 6EB; England
- Coordinates: 53.8797°N 1.9154°W

Information
- Type: Academy
- Local authority: Bradford City Council
- Trust: Carlton Academy Trust
- Department for Education URN: 136198 Tables
- Ofsted: Reports
- Gender: Coeducational
- Age: 11 to 16
- Enrolment: 676 as of February 2023
- Website: http://uak.org.uk/

Carlton Keighley (formerly Greenhead Grammar School, Greenhead High School and then University Academy Keighley) is a coeducational secondary school located in Utley (a suburb of Keighley), in the English county of West Yorkshire.

Previously a community school administered by Bradford City Council, Greenhead High School converted to academy status in September 2010 and was renamed University Academy Keighley. The school was then sponsored by the University of Bradford and Bradford City Council. It became part of the Bradford-based Carlton Academy Trust. in 2022 and was renamed Carlton Keighley.

Carlton Keighley offers GCSEs, BTECs and Cambridge Nationals as programmes of study for pupils. Facilities at the school are also available for use by the local community outside school hours.
