= Keighley Town Hall =

Municipal building in Keighley, West Yorkshire, England

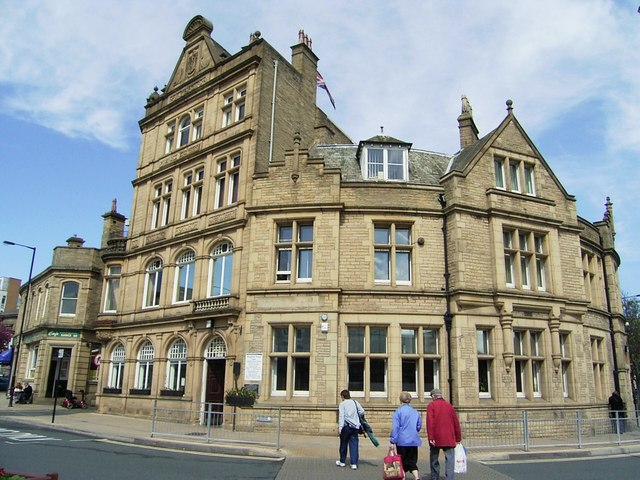
- Keighley Town Hall

- Shown in West Yorkshire
- 53.8674°N 1.9089°W
- Location: Bow Street, Keighley

History
- Built: 1902

Site notes
- Architect: John Haggas
- Architectural style: Renaissance style

Listed Building – Grade II
- Designated: 4 December 1986
- Reference no.: 1134150

Keighley Town Hall is an early 20th century municipal building in Keighley, West Yorkshire, England. It is a Grade II listed building.

== History ==
After the town was incorporated as a municipal borough in July 1882, the borough council initially met in the offices of the local board of health in Low Bridge in Keighley. After finding that these offices were too cramped, civic leaders decided to procure a new town hall: the site they selected in Bow Street had previously been occupied by a large timber yard.

Construction of the new building began in 1900. It was designed by John Haggas in the Renaissance style, and the council chamber was officially opened by the mayor, Councillor Henry Crofts Longsdon with a golden key in 1901. The rest of the building was not actually fully completed until 1902. The design involved an asymmetrical main frontage of three bays facing Bow Street, with a further bay curving round into Town Hall Street on the left; there was a round-headed doorway in the right hand bay on the ground floor; there was also an oriel window in the bay curving round on the first floor, with cross-windows on the second floor and an Ipswich window on the third floor and there was a pediment contain the town's coat of arms at roof level. Internally, the principal room was the council chamber which was panelled and decorated with coats of arms.

The borough council subsequently acquired a large stone yard to the north of the town hall in order to create Town Hall Square. A war memorial, designed by Henry Charles Fehr was erected in the middle of the square and unveiled by General Sir Charles Harrington on 7 December 1924. In 1942, during the Second World War, a ceremony took place in Town Hall Square to commemorate the borough's fund raising achievements during Warship Week and its adoption of the destroyer HMS Marne. The town hall continued to serve as the headquarters of Keighley Borough Council but it ceased to be the local seat of government on the formation of the enlarged Bradford City Council in 1974.

After a campaign for greater local democracy, the town hall became the meeting place for the new town council which was formed in April 2002. The town council received criticism from the Secretary of State for Communities and Local Government, Eric Pickles, when members of the public were ejected from the town hall for filming proceedings in July 2013. Captain Sir Tom Moore attended a ceremony to receive the honorary freedom of the town in Town Hall Square in July 2020. The building is used by Bradford City Council to offer a variety of services including a register office.

== See also ==
- Listed buildings in Keighley
