= Timothy Taylor Brewery =

Brewery in Keighley, West Yorkshire, England

Timothy Taylor's Brewery

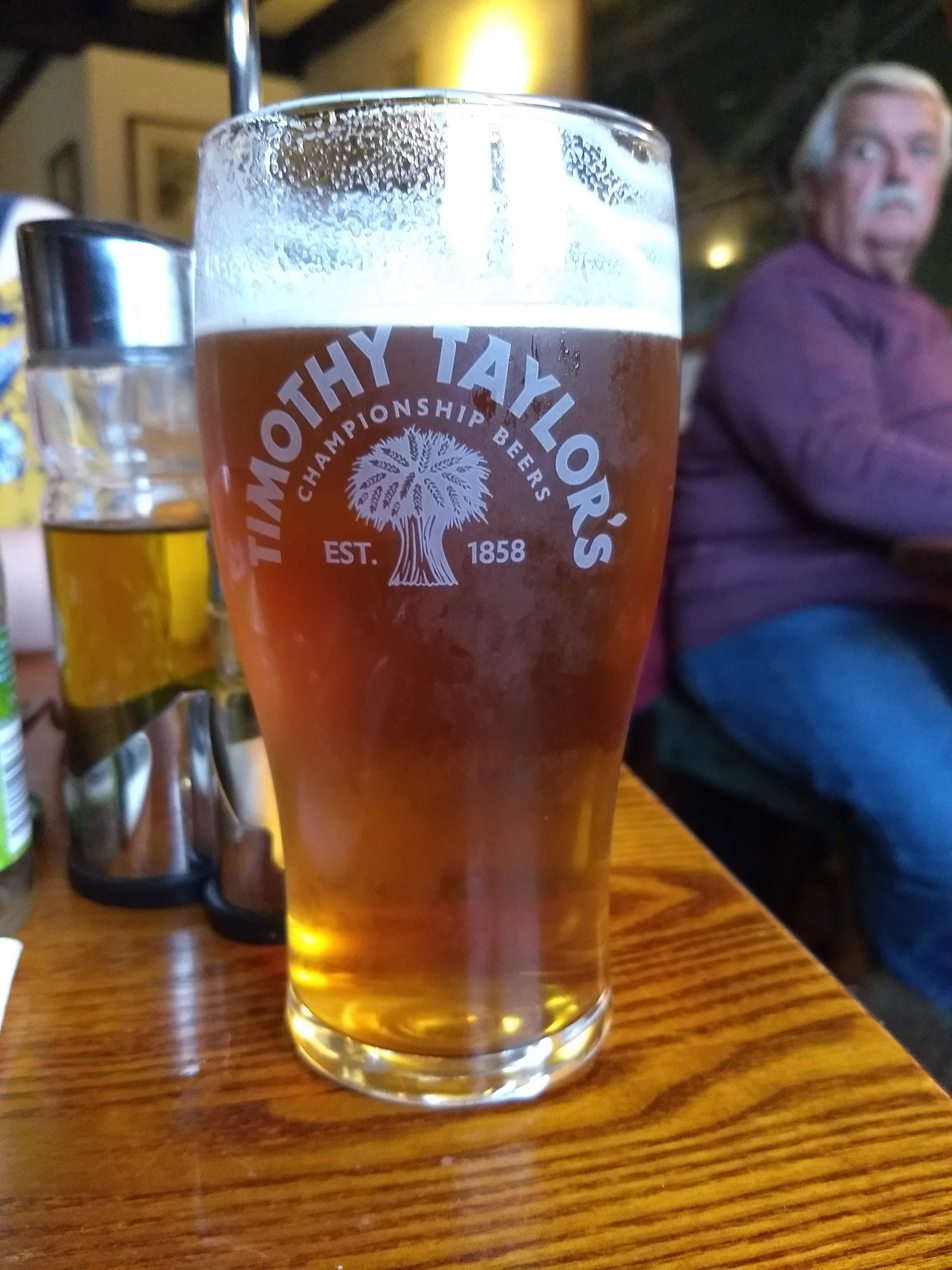
- Type: Privately held company
- Industry: Brewery
- Founded: 1858
- Founder: Timothy Taylor
- Headquarters: Keighley, Yorkshire, England
- Products: Beer
- Website: http://www.timothytaylor.co.uk/

Timothy Taylor's is a family-owned regional brewery, founded in 1858 by Timothy Taylor, in Keighley, West Yorkshire, England. Timothy Taylor's moved to larger premises in 1863 at Knowle Spring in Keighley, where they remain.

The brewery is best known for Timothy Taylor's Landlord, the highest-selling cask ale in Britain, which accounts for 80 per cent of output.

== Beers ==
=== Landlord ===
Timothy Taylor's best known beer is Landlord, a pale ale, 4.3% abv when cask conditioned, and 4.1% when sold filtered in the bottle. It contains Styrian Goldings, Goldings and Fuggles hops. It was created for miners, to compete against local rival Barnsley Bitter. Landlord has four times been Champion Beer of Britain at the Great British Beer Festival. The brand attracted media attention in 2003 when Madonna said in an interview with Jonathan Ross that it was her favourite beer. Since then the draught beer has become more widely available throughout the country and Landlord is also being exported in bottles.

Landlord is available in the brewery's own tied pubs, and is often available as a guest ale in other pubs, especially those in Yorkshire. Bottled Landlord is available in Tesco, Waitrose, Morrisons and several other supermarkets, as well as from the brewery's webshop.

=== Boltmaker ===
Timothy Taylor's Best Bitter was renamed Boltmaker in 2012 to better distinguish it from their ale Golden Best. Boltmaker won Gold in the Bitter category at the Great British Beer Festival in 2014 and was also crowned their Champion Beer of Britain 2014.

Boltmaker is a Yorkshire Bitter which is 4% when cask conditioned or 4.2% when sold filtered in the bottle. It was originally bottled exclusively for Tesco shortly before winning Champion Beer of Britain 2014. In late 2015 bottled Boltmaker became available in other supermarkets such as Waitrose.

=== Knowle Spring Blonde ===
Introduced in 2017, Knowle Spring Blonde is a 4.2% blonde beer and the brewery's first addition to their core range since 1952.

=== Others ===
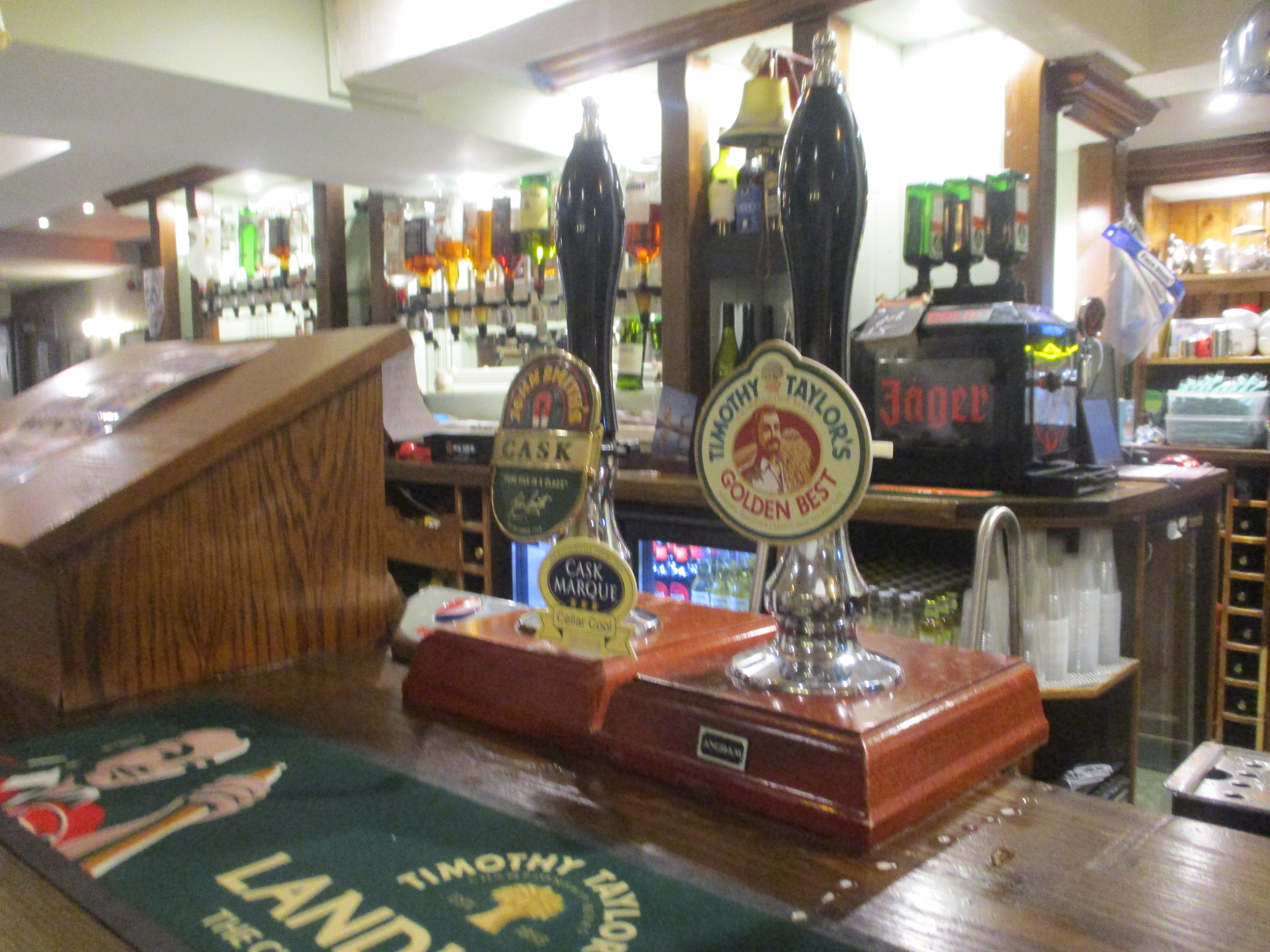
Timothy Taylor Golden Best pump

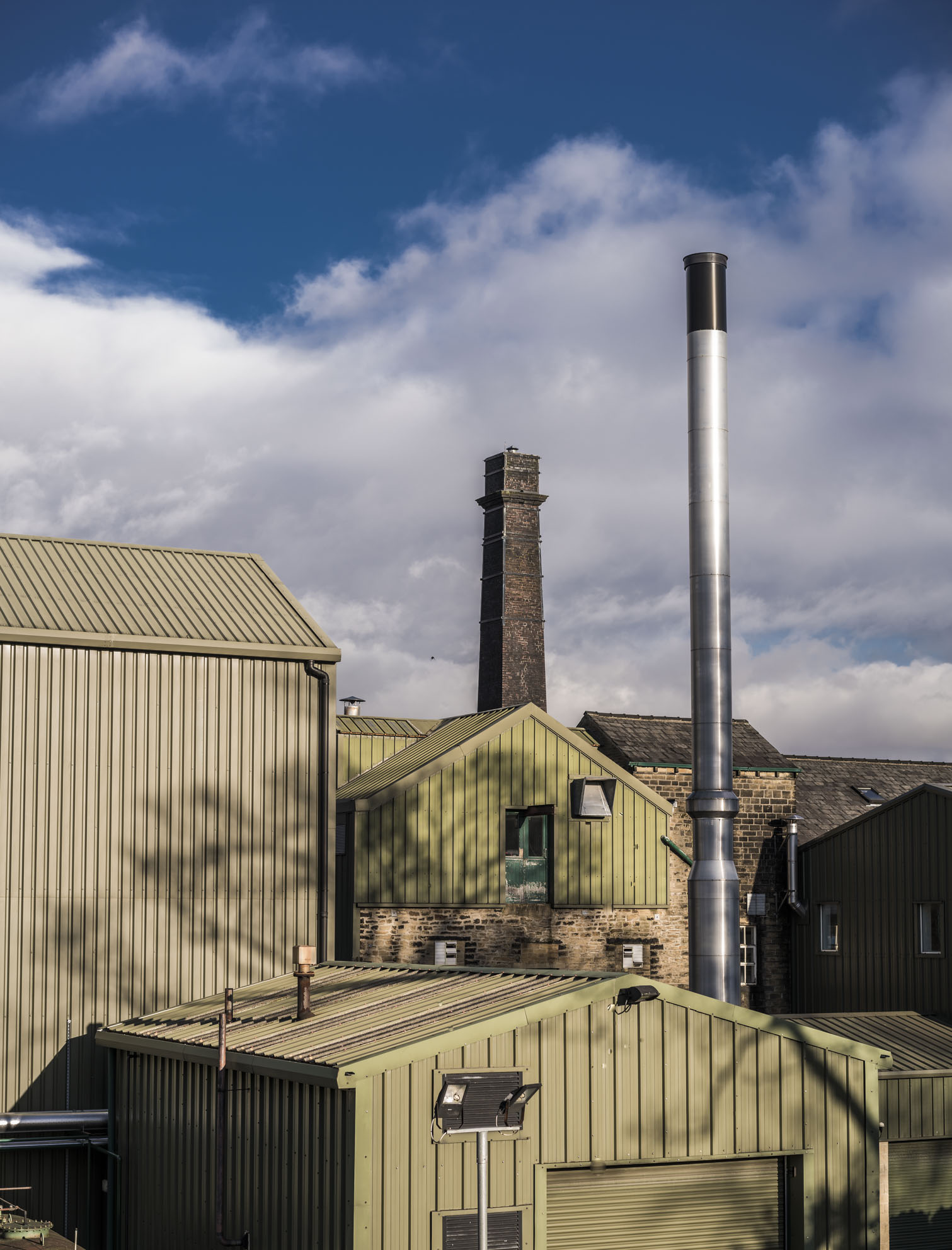
Timothy Taylor's brewery at their current Knowle Spring site in Keighley

A variety of other ales, such as Golden Best, Dark Mild and Ram Tam (renamed Landlord Dark in 2019) may be found in Timothy Taylor's houses. Landlord Dark can be found in some supermarkets. A new French style blonde ale Le Champion was brewed specially to celebrate the 2014 Tour de France Grand Depart in Leeds. With the advent of the Tour de Yorkshire cycling event in 2015, Le Champion was brewed again in April 2015 and is being brewed again in March 2016. Poulter's Porter was first brewed in 2017 and is named after Arthur Poulter, a former employee at the brewery who received the Victoria Cross for gallantry in the First World War.

Timothy Taylor's also produce an occasional special bottled ale called Havercake Ale.

In the past Timothy Taylor's produced another bottled ale called Northerner, bearing the advertising slogan, For Men of the North. This slogan has been reinvented as "All for that taste of Taylor's" and is borne on the back of the wagons.

== Brewery ==
In 1858, Timothy Taylor opened a brewery in Cook Lane, Keighley, moving in 1863 to Knowle Spring Brewery, Keighley. In 1894, a deep well was sunk at Knowle Spring. This artesian well still supplies the brewery's water. In 1928, malting ceased at Knowle Spring. Oldham Brewery's brewhouse, bought after its closure, was installed at Knowle Spring in 1991. The yeast strain also originally came from the Oldham Brewery.

Only whole hops are used for brewing. 80 percent of production is for cask-conditioned products.

== Pubs ==
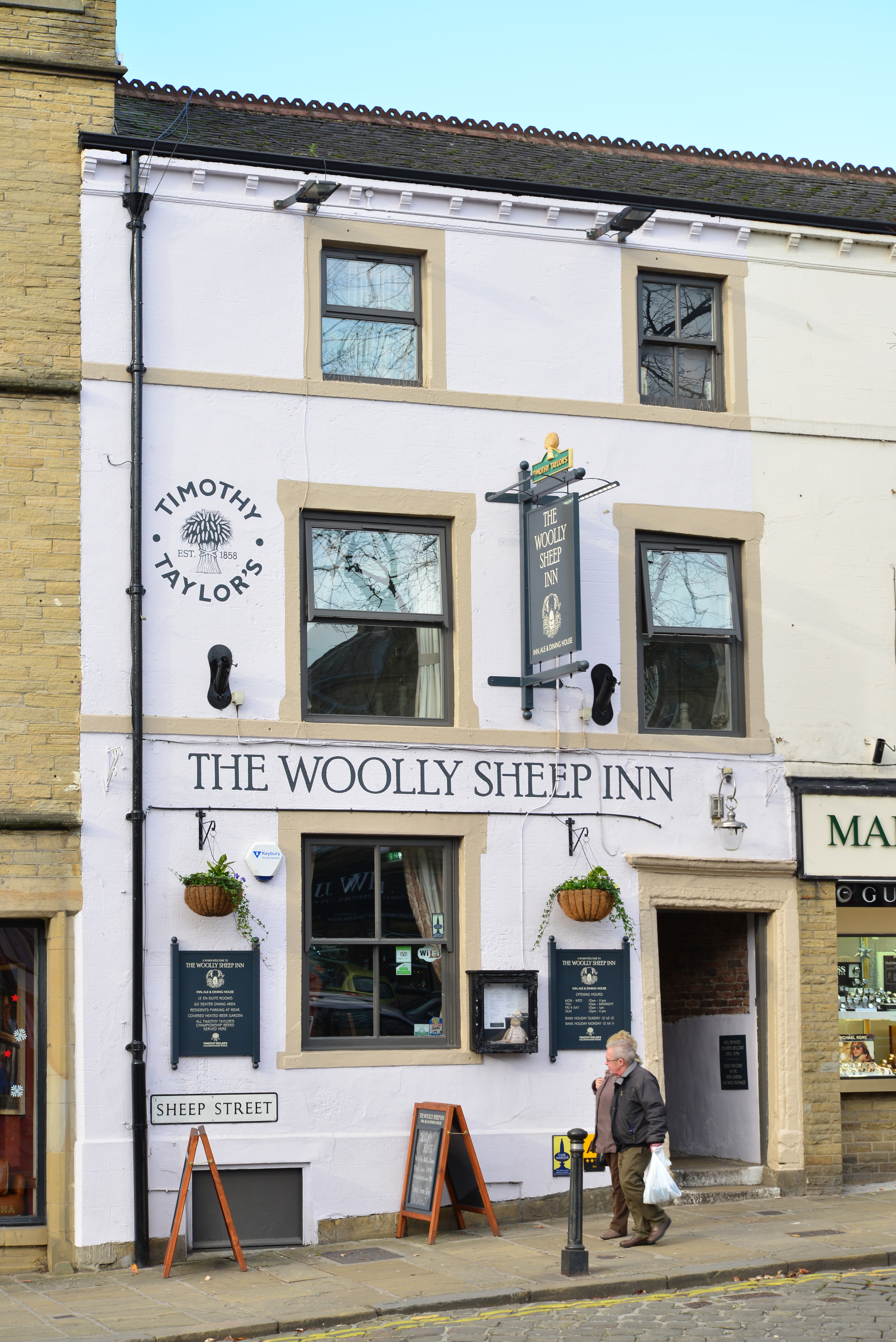
The Woolly Sheep Inn in Skipton is a Timothy Taylor's pub.

Timothy Taylor's currently has 19 of its own tied pubs in Bingley, Cononley, Fence near Colne, Haworth, Grassington, Halifax, Keighley, Leeds, Malsis near Cross Hills, Oakworth, Oxenhope, Ripon, Skipton, Thornton and Wadsworth near Hebden Bridge.

These are the Albert Hotel in Keighley, the Boltmakers Arms in Keighley, the Brown Cow in Bingley, the Inn at Cheltenham Parade in Harrogate, the Crossroads Inn in Halifax, the Devonshire Hotel in Grassington, the Dog & Gun in Malsis, the Dog & Gun in Oxenhope, the Fleece Inn in Haworth, the Grouse Inn in Oldfield, the Hare & Hounds in Wadsworth, Taylor's on the Green in Keighley, the New Inn in Cononley, the Royal Oak in Keighley, the Royal Oak in Ripon, the Town Hall Tavern in central Leeds, the White Horse in Thornton, the White Swan in Fence and the Woolly Sheep in Skipton. All of these pubs are run by tenants, except for Taylor's on the Green in Keighley and the Woolly Sheep in Skipton, which are run by Timothy Taylor's itself.
