= Edge of the City (2004 film) =

2004 British television documentary film

Edge of the City is a British television documentary film broadcast on Channel 4 in 2004. Directed by Anna Hall, the film focuses on social workers in the City of Bradford.

The film covered four social work cases. One involved a child sex abuse ring in Keighley, in which the perpetrators were mainly British Asian and the victims white. The documentary was unofficially shared by the British National Party (BNP) ahead of elections. West Yorkshire Police recommended that Channel 4 move the airdate from May to August in order to avoid the elections, a recommendation that the broadcaster took.

== Synopsis ==
The film shows four social work cases for authorities in the City of Bradford. Matthew is a 17-year-old with 96 prior offences, whose case worker is trainee Omar; Matthew is white and Omar is Muslim. Caroline and Keith are a disabled couple who have frequently moved house to avoid harassment from children; Keith, who has cerebral palsy, is also a violent alcoholic. Eric is an 83-year-old man who wishes to remain independent.

The fourth case involved two white mothers in Keighley who reported that their daughters were victims of a child sex abuse ring, mostly comprising British Asian men. The parents said that the gang were targeting girls aged 11–12, flattering them with gifts, and then drugging and raping them. The film said that the authorities were investigating 50–70 cases of child grooming.

== Production ==
Director Anna Hall said that she wanted to document the work of social workers because other services such as doctors and the police were frequently the subject of documentaries, and social workers were only heard from when things went wrong. She chose to set the film in Bradford as production company Chameleon TV was nearby in Leeds.

Originally, there were going to be other stories from the children's department of the social services, but none of these were given legal permission to air. Hall said the issue of sex grooming "kept surfacing", but social workers were frightened to talk about the issue as they feared violent responses.

== BNP controversy ==
The film was due to be broadcast in May 2004. The British National Party (BNP) shared the video on its website, falsely calling it a "BNP party political broadcast" ahead of local and European elections. West Yorkshire Police warned Channel 4 that the film could provoke racial violence in Bradford, which had experienced race riots in 2001. Channel 4, which according to The Guardian "normally takes great pride in its reputation for stirring up controversy", postponed the broadcast due to "exceptional circumstances".

The BNP based its actual election broadcast on the issues brought up by the film. This broadcast was only shown on Five, and in a highly censored form. The BBC showed a separate BNP broadcast, due to insisting that it had to be on issues relevant to the European elections.

The Black Information Link (Blink), run by The 1990 Trust, campaigned for the rescheduled broadcast on 26 August 2004 to be pulled. Blink felt that the racial situation in Bradford had become worse since the elections. Channel 4 said that the film was in the public interest and the police had agreed to the airing.

Hall said that she was depressed by media reporting that reduced her film, which had taken two years to make, to a "BNP Sex Row Film". She said that far-right parties had taken the film to be an endorsement of their views, while the left had seen the film as racist, both of which she denied. Hall said that the BNP intervention had led to victims and their mothers being falsely accused of being party activists.

== Reception ==
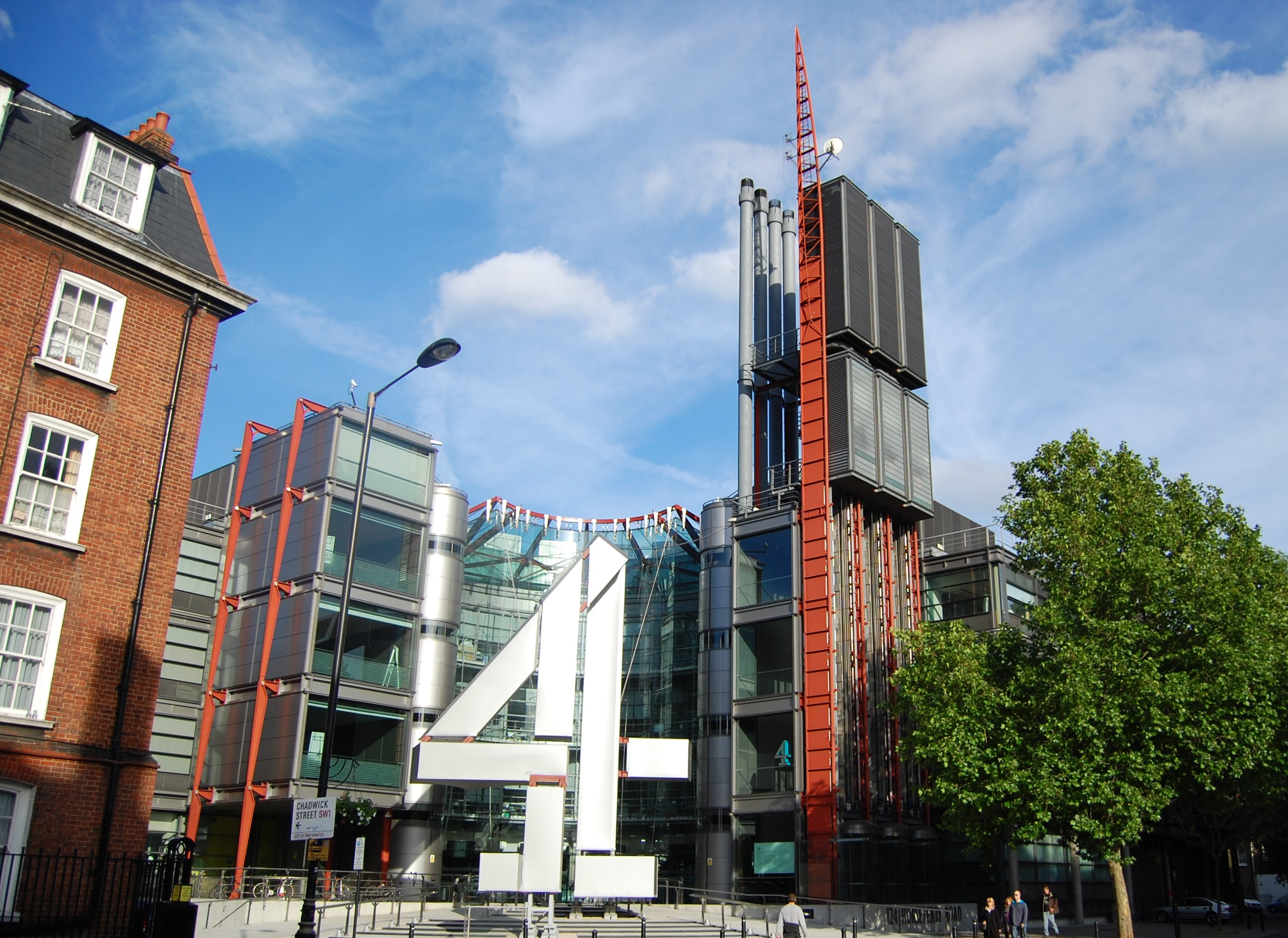
Channel 4 (headquarters pictured) defended the documentary as an example of its daring programming.

Dominic Casciani of BBC News found the coverage of sexual abuse to be "problematic". He found issue with the narration saying that Bradford's ethnic diversity creates division, as well as a camera shot of a mosque when the narrator said that victims were as young as 11. He criticised another piece of narration saying that the gangs were out of control of community elders, believing that it suggested that the community had the responsibility of taking on crime. Omar Sheikh, a social worker filmed in the documentary, wrote in the Eastern Eye that mosques and community leaders had a responsibility to be role models to younger men, as the police were not trusted by the community. Casciani called Omar Sheikh's interaction with teenage recidivist Matthew "compelling human drama", and recommended that the four cases in the film be made into four separate documentaries.

Mark Lawson of The Guardian wrote that "There can never previously have been a documentary about a city in peacetime in a leading industrial democracy that consisted of such unrelenting bleakness", adding that the main danger would be the film prompting "suicidal despair", rather than racial animosity. The Church Times called the documentary a "modern Calvary, an image of hope beyond suffering", and pointed out the efforts by Omar Sheikh to reform Matthew as evidence that the film was not racist.

Channel 4 director of programmes Kevin Lygo wrote in The Independent in November 2004 that Edge of the City was one of the Channel's documentaries that showed it was at the "centre of the debate about where the boundaries of TV lie", along with films on racism, abortion and human decomposition.

Writing in 2025, Kenan Malik argued that Hall and other women had been bringing attention to child grooming for decades, in response to academic Matthew Goodwin's assertion that the issue was not in the media until 2011.

In April 2025, Channel 4 aired Hall's follow-up documentary Groomed: A National Scandal. Lucy Mangan of The Guardian gave it four stars out of five, saying that Hall's anger over the continuing scandal was "palpable".
