= Keighley child sex abuse ring =

Child Sexual abuse ring in Keighley and Bradford, West Yorkshire, England

The Keighley child sex abuse ring was a group of twelve men who committed serious sexual offences against two under-aged girls in the English town of Keighley and city of Bradford, West Yorkshire. In December 2015, they were found guilty of rape and other forms of sexual abuse by a unanimous jury verdict at Bradford Crown Court. They were sentenced in February 2016 to a total of 130 years in jail. The main victim, who had been targeted by ten of the men, was aged between 13 and 14 at the time of the attacks between 2011 and 2012. All the men convicted are of Pakistani descent.

== Crimes ==
The main victim was groomed with gifts and apparent displays of affection before being coerced into abusive sexual relationships. She was raped in various locations in Keighley, including parks, churchyards and an underground car-park. The rapists had designated part of the car-park "X's corner" with graffiti and added their own names. During one sustained rape she was attacked by five men in succession. In an interview with police, she said that Choudhury had employed her as a drugs-courier and that when she tried to stop working for him, he called her a “little white slag” and a “little white bastard”. He then physically restrained her and raped her, according to her testimony.

== Guilty men ==
Those found guilty of rape were named as Sufyan Ziarab, 22; his brother Bilal Ziarab, 21; Yasser Kabir, 25; Hussain Sardar, 19; Nasir Khan, 22; Saqib Younis, 29; Israr Ali, 19; Faisal Khan, 27; Zain Ali, 20; and Tanqueer Hussain, 23. An 11th defendant, Mohammed Akram, 63, was found guilty of sexual activity with a child. Four other men were found not guilty of similar charges and one man will face a re-trial. A twelfth man, Khalid Mahmood, 34, had pleaded guilty to five counts of rape before the trial. Another man, Arif Choudhury, who was previously on the run in Bangladesh, was arrested in June of 2022 upon arriving to the United Kingdom, and sentenced to 8 years of jailtime.

== Official reactions to case ==
=== After guilty verdicts ===
After the verdicts were returned, Judge Roger Thomas QC told the guilty men that they had treated the proceedings with "contempt and arrogance". He said that in his 40 years of practice as a lawyer, he had never seen other defendants who had been as "insolent and disrespectful". He had formed, he said, the "poorest of opinions about the defendants." Detective Chief Inspector Chris Walker of West Yorkshire Police said after the verdict that the investigation had been “challenging, complex and sensitive”. He paid tribute to the victims for their courage in testifying against their abusers and described child sexual exploitation as "totally unacceptable" and "one of the most important challenges facing the police".

=== After sentencing ===
Kris Hopkins, Conservative MP for Keighley, condemned what he called the "sick model of organised groups of Asian men grooming young white girls" and claimed that more women were still suffering abuse in the same way. In a statement issued by his office, he said the convictions were vindication of controversial comments he had made in parliament in 2012, when he said that organised groups of Asian men were raping white girls. He claimed to have been criticized for these claims.

Judge Roger Thomas QC described the men's behaviour while on trial as "contemptuous, disrespectful and arrogant". Some of them had treated their prosecution as a joke from the beginning. They had grinned in the police photographs taken when they were arrested, misbehaved in the dock during the trial, and laughed and waved to supporters in the public gallery as they were convicted. The judge said that they had treated the girl in a heartless and demeaning way, seeing her as simply an object for their own sexual gratification. The court was told that she now suffered from post-traumatic stress disorder and clinical depression.

Some defendants had previous convictions for drug-dealing, dangerous driving, assault, public disorder, stealing and handling stolen goods. Arif Choudhury, the alleged ringleader of the gang, is believed to have travelled to Bangladesh to escape prosecution following his arrest and release on bail. He had begun pimping the girl in Keighley when he was only 15 and was described in court as an evil and violent individual who had first employed the girl as a drugs-courier before subjecting her to repeated rapes, beatings and racial abuse. Khalid Raja Mahmood was already serving a six-and-a-half-year sentence for the rape of a 43-year-old woman, with a consecutive one-and-a-half-year sentence for attempting the false imprisonment of a child. Nicknamed "Creepy Khalid" in Keighley, he had convictions for a total of seven sexual offences, including indecent assault and curb crawling. Yasser Kabir had told the girl in front of her grandmother that she could "suck me off". In addition to the 20 years he received for raping her, he was sentenced for the rapes of two other girls, one aged between six and seven, the other between seven and nine, which he had committed when he himself was aged between 13 and 15.

Mark Burns-Williamson, West Yorkshire's Police and Crime Commissioner, described child sexual exploitation (CSE) and sexual abuse as "abhorrent crimes", welcomed the sentences and commended the investigation by West Yorkshire Police, which was assisted by Bradford Council's Safeguarding Team. He also commended the courage of abuse survivors in giving evidence against their abusers and expressed the hope that the trial would further underline the commitment of the authorities to end CSE in West Yorkshire.

Detective Chief Inspector Nicola Bryar, of the Homicide and Major Enquiry Team in West Yorkshire Police, expressed her satisfaction at the sentences and also commended the courage of the victims. She noted that CSE remained a priority for West Yorkshire Police, describing it as totally unacceptable and stressing the responsibility of all agencies, communities and individuals to identify the perpetrators and assist their prosecution, conviction and jailing.

== Sentences ==
Those found guilty were named as:

Forename	Surname	Age	Of	Charges
Khalid Raja	Mahmood	34	Keighley	17-year extended sentence for two charges of rape and three charges of sexual activity with a child.
Tauqeer	Hussain	23	Keighley	18 years for two counts of rape against the first victim and one rape against another teenage girl.
Yasser	Kabir	25	Keighley	20 years for three counts of rape against the first victim and four charges of rape, two charges of sexual assault, two charges of assault by penetration and four charges of causing a child to engage in sexual activity against two young girls.
Sufyan	Ziarab	23	Keighley	15 years for two counts of rape.
Bilal	Ziarab	21	Bradford	12 years for two counts of rape.
Israr	Ali	19	Keighley	3-and-half-years in a young offenders’ institution for one count of rape.
Nasir	Khan	24	Keighley	13 years for one count of rape.
Saqib	Younis	29	Keighley	13 years for one count of rape.
Hussain	Sardar	19	Keighley	6 years in a young offenders’ institution for one count of rape.
Zain	Ali	20	Keighley	8 years in a young offenders’ institution for one count of rape.
Faisal	Khan	27	Keighley	13 years for one count of rape.
Mohammed	Akram	63	Keighley	5 years for one count of sexual activity with a child.

== See also ==
- Child sexual abuse in the United Kingdom
- List of sexual abuses perpetrated by groups
- Edge of the City (2004 film), documentary
