= Keighley Festival =

Festival in West Yorkshire, England

The Keighley Festival is a festival held in the town of Keighley, West Yorkshire, England during a two-week period in June or July each year. The festival consists of various local events and Galas. The aim is to incorporate local talent, hobbies, and pastimes to illustrate diversity and local community spirit.

== History ==
The Keighley Festival was started in 1986, and has had various names over the years. Until 2005 it was called the Keighley Festivals. The Keighley Festival now amalgamates the "Festival of Learning" and the "Keighley Festivals" and is known as the Keighley Festival.
