= Keighley Picture House =

Cinema in Keighley, West Yorkshire, England

Coordinates: 53°52′11″N 01°54′33″W

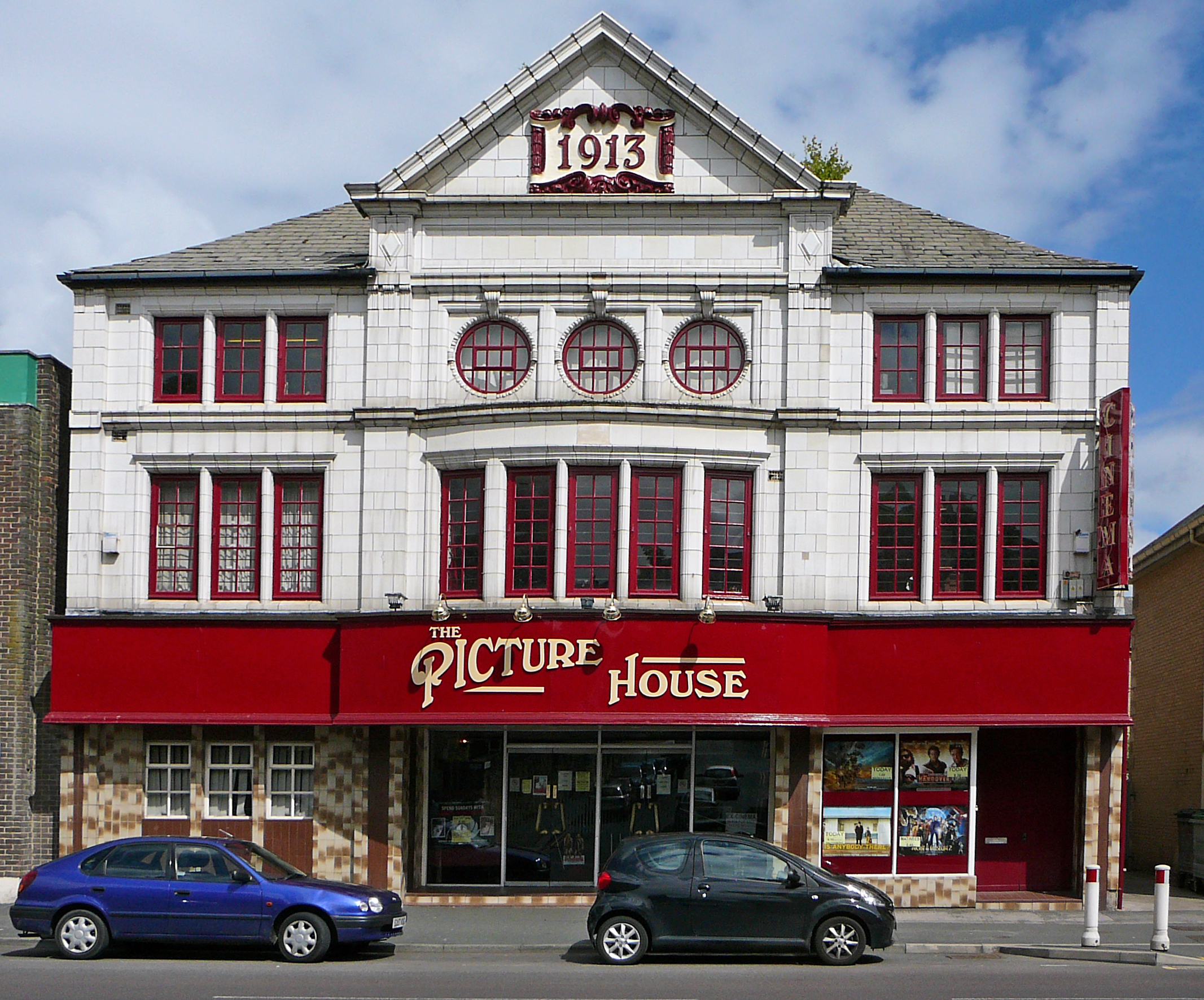
Keighley Picture House

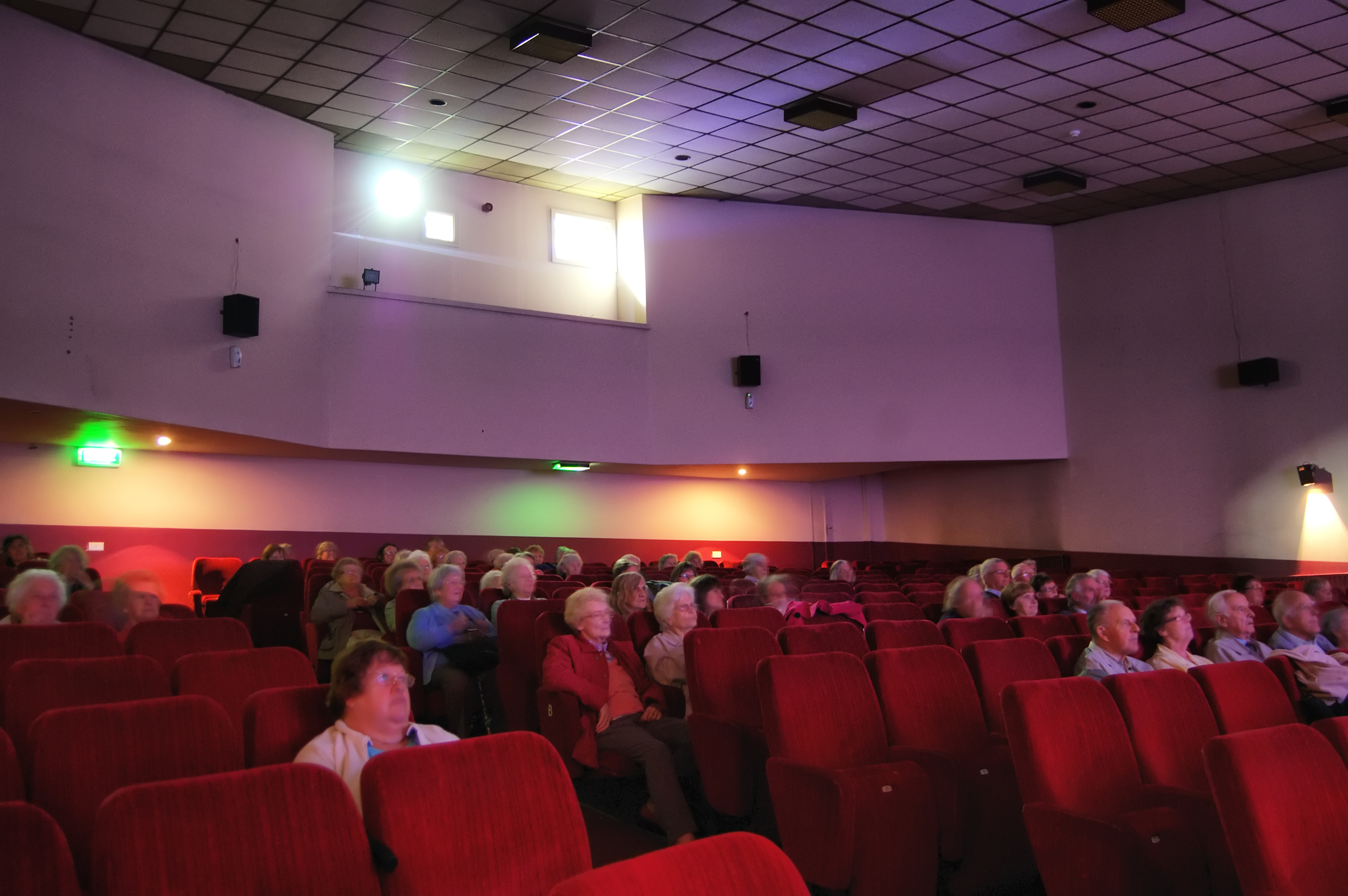
Interior of Keighley Picture House

Keighley Picture House is a cinema located in Keighley, West Yorkshire, England.

It opened in 1913 as a receiving house theatre which also showed films, with a large auditorium containing stalls and balcony seating. In years to come it was used for live shows and pop concerts as well as regular film screenings. Sometime after the end of the Second World War, the Balcony was extended, bringing the total number of seats close to 1,000, the second biggest auditorium in Keighley after the Hippodrome/Queens Theatre. In 1954, the independent locally owned cinema was purchased by Essoldo cinemas and folded into their chain, losing its "Picture House" moniker in the process and becoming "Keighley Essoldo".

In or around 1974 the Essoldo chain was absorbed by Classic Cinemas, making Classic the biggest cinema chain in Europe at that time. Classic were responsible for closing and gutting what remained of the venue’s theatre and converting the balcony into a second screen and projection room for the main screen, which is how it remains today.

In 1983, Classic went bankrupt and the cinema was acquired from creditors by Bradford Metropolitan Council, who leased it to a small local firm or co-operative venture. This group restored the cinema’s former name, “The Picture House". They in turn went out of business in 1991 and the cinema was closed, but was eventually leased from owners Bradford Met Council by the Northern Morris company and re-opened in 1996. Northern Morris Associated Cinemas currently own and operate six cinemas in the North of England, including The Cottage Road Cinema in Headingley, Leeds, The Rex at Elland, The Plaza at Skipton, The Roxy at Ulverston and The Royalty at Bowness-on-Windermere.

The Picture House now has a main downstairs auditorium which seats about 300 and a smaller upstairs auditorium which seats about 90.

In 2013 the cinema was upgraded to digital projection in both auditoria, with 2k projection and Dolby Stereo sound.
