= Keighley and District Local History Society =

English local history society

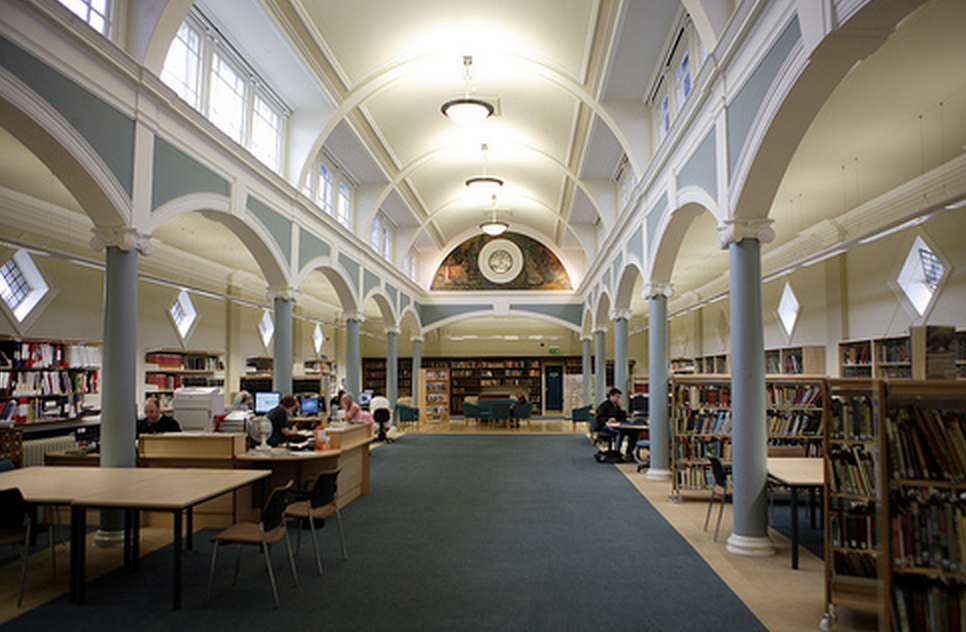
- Keighley Local Studies Library, where the history society holds its meetings.
- Founded: 2004
- Purpose: environmental history, forests, forestry, natural resources
- Location: Keighley, West Yorkshire, United Kingdom
- Region served: Keighley and its surrounding area.
- Method: Research, publication, education, library, archives, speakers, events
- Chair: Joyce Newton
- Website: https://keighleyhistory.org.uk/

The Keighley and District Local History Society (KDLHS) is an English local history society covering the town of Keighley, West Yorkshire, and its surrounding area. It was founded in 2004, following the centenary of Keighley Library.

The society is active in the preservation of local and family history resources, and is currently in the process of digitalising their archive to make the resources more easily available to fellow researchers in both the local community and world-wide.

Regular meetings are held every second Wednesday of the month, in the Local Studies Library in Keighley Library. The meetings allow members to listen to expert speakers in their specialist area of local history, and to be updated on Society business.
