= Utley, West Yorkshire =

Village in West Yorkshire, England

Coordinates: 53.88°N 1.91°W

Utley
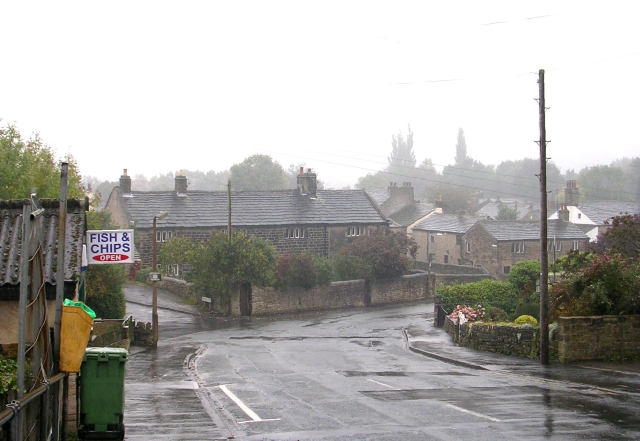
- Birchwood Road, Utley

- Location within West Yorkshire
- Population: 5,500
- OS grid reference: SE0542
- Metropolitan borough: City of Bradford
- Metropolitan county: West Yorkshire
- Region: Yorkshire and the Humber
- Country: England
- Sovereign state: United Kingdom
- Post town: Keighley
- Postcode district: BD20
- Police: West Yorkshire
- Fire: West Yorkshire
- Ambulance: Yorkshire

Utley is a village that forms a suburb of the town of Keighley within the county of West Yorkshire, England, approximately 1.5 miles (2.4 km) from the town centre.

== History ==
In 1086 the Craven section of the Domesday Book lists Utelaia as owned by the Viking Vilts. He was taxed on about 120 acres (49 hectares) of arable ploughland here. He also owned Newsholme but shared Oakworth with Gamel Bern. It has been suggested that the name means oat field or outfield (of Keighley) or that it was a meadow (Ley) owned by Utta.

Utley was a small collection of buildings when the Keighley to Skipton Turnpike opened up in the early 18th century. The road became the dividing line between Low and High Utley and in the 1930s, the road became the A629 road. The A629 was downgraded into the B6265 when the A629 Kildwick to Beechcliffe bypass was opened in August 1988.

In 2001 the area had a population of 5,000 which had risen to 5,500 by the 2011 census.

== Facilities ==
It has a large secondary school on Greenhead Lane (Carlton Keighley), and previously had a primary school on the same road. Utley also has a local newsagents, pub, restaurant, a children's park in the Beechcliffe area and a Fish and chip shop that was named as one of the best 50 chip shops in Britain for three years running between 2014 and 2016.

Within Utley is a large cemetery covering 3.7 hectares (9.1 acres). The cemetery is the final resting place for many people from Utley and Keighley, including surrounding villages such as Riddlesden and Steeton and is the oldest cemetery maintained by Bradford Council having been opened in 1857.

Near to the cemetery, just across the River Aire, is Keighley Golf Club, an 18-hole private members course.

== Transport ==
The road access to Utley is via the B6265 road (Skipton Road) which runs through it and on to Steeton.

Local buses are mostly provided by Burnley Bus Company and Keighley Bus Company with a handful of journeys by Jackson's of Silsden.

Utley was formerly a terminus on the Keighley Tramways Corporation line from Ingrow via Keighley town centre. Originally the trams were horse-drawn and gave way to electric trams in 1904. The network closed in 1924 to be replaced by buses.

== Notable people ==
- Mike Jones (canoeist), died whilst trying to rescue a companion on the Braldu River for which he was posthumously awarded the Queen's Gallantry Medal (QGM)

== See also ==
- Listed buildings in Keighley
