= The Sailmakers =

English psychedelic rock band

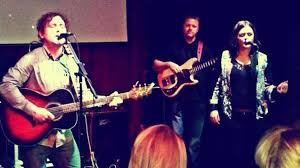
The Sailmakers performing live at The Library, Leeds, 2013.

The Sailmakers are an English psychedelic rock band from Keighley, West Yorkshire, England. The band formed in 2008.

== BBC Introducing ==
The band were selected along with five other acts to perform at The Venue, Leeds College of Music as part of '360 Live' in association with BBC Introducing in February 2012, and are also being championed by BBC Introducing having played five live sessions on Alan Raw's show, and given regular airplay. On 7 September 2013, the band played a live session on BBC Introducing in West Yorkshire, debuting three songs from their new EP Shifting Sands.

== Singles, EPs and debut album ==
The band released their first single "Like a River" on their own label, Kingpot Records, on 6 January 2012. This was followed by their acclaimed debut EP Creaking Ships and Midnight Whiskey on 26 March 2012. The band then released the digital single "Remember", on Friday 24 August 2012 via iTunes, Spotify, Amazon and Deezer. In February 2013, the single "99 Miles" was released, which is available from Crash Records, Jumbo Records, iTunes, Spotify, Amazon and Deezer. Exclusive limited edition copies, featuring the b-side "In The Snow", were available at the launch party for this single.

On 9 September 2013 via Crash Records, Jumbo Records, iTunes, Spotify, Amazon and Deezer, The Sailmakers released their second EP Shifting Sands. Exclusive limited edition copies, featuring artwork, T-shirts, and Badges were available at the launch party, held at the 360 Club Leeds on 13 September 2013.

On 3 May 2014 the digital single "Delivo" was released. The launch party for this single was held at The Wardrobe Leeds as a double headline event with York based band Littlemores. On 31 October 2014 the single "Space Tapestry" was released. The latest release from the band is the single "Preach Preach Preach", released via Kingpot Records on 28 May 2015, as free download/album teaser.

On 14 March 2016 The Sailmakers released their debut album entitled VINES, on Kingpot Records, featuring Lee Southall (The Coral) and championed by the likes of Michael Head (Shack) Written by Ryan and Tess, Vines takes a contemporary spin on the synth driven sounds of the past. It was recorded and produced by Ryan Madden at The Sailmakers’ purpose built 'Delicious Recording Studio', in Keighley, West Yorkshire. Formerly a joiner's workshop, the studio was transformed into a creative haven for song writing and experimentation.

On 15 October 2015 The Sailmakers played their first show in over two and a half years at The Brudenell Social Club Leeds. After supporting chart band Embrace at Halifax Boxing Club in July 2017, they are rumoured to be working on their second album. The latest releases from the band have been the two stand alone singles "Golden Ratio" and "A Dream Inside", both released digitally.

== Sound and influences ==
The band's sound has changed somewhat since its formation. In the first years, their sound had hints of Crosby, Stills and Nash, and The La's, as noted by Chris Helme formally of The Seahorses. Their sound has changed a lot from groove orientated folk-rock, to a more psychedelic direction, with playful lyrics and dynamic weaving guitars. Their songwriting has been described as melancholic and truly fascinating.

== Personnel ==
- Ryan Madden – Lead vocals, lead guitar
- Tess O'Donovan – Synths/Keys, vocals
- Rick Furness – Bass
- Mark Redman – Drums
