= Keighley =

Market town and civil parish in West Yorkshire, England

Coordinates: 53.867°N 1.911°W

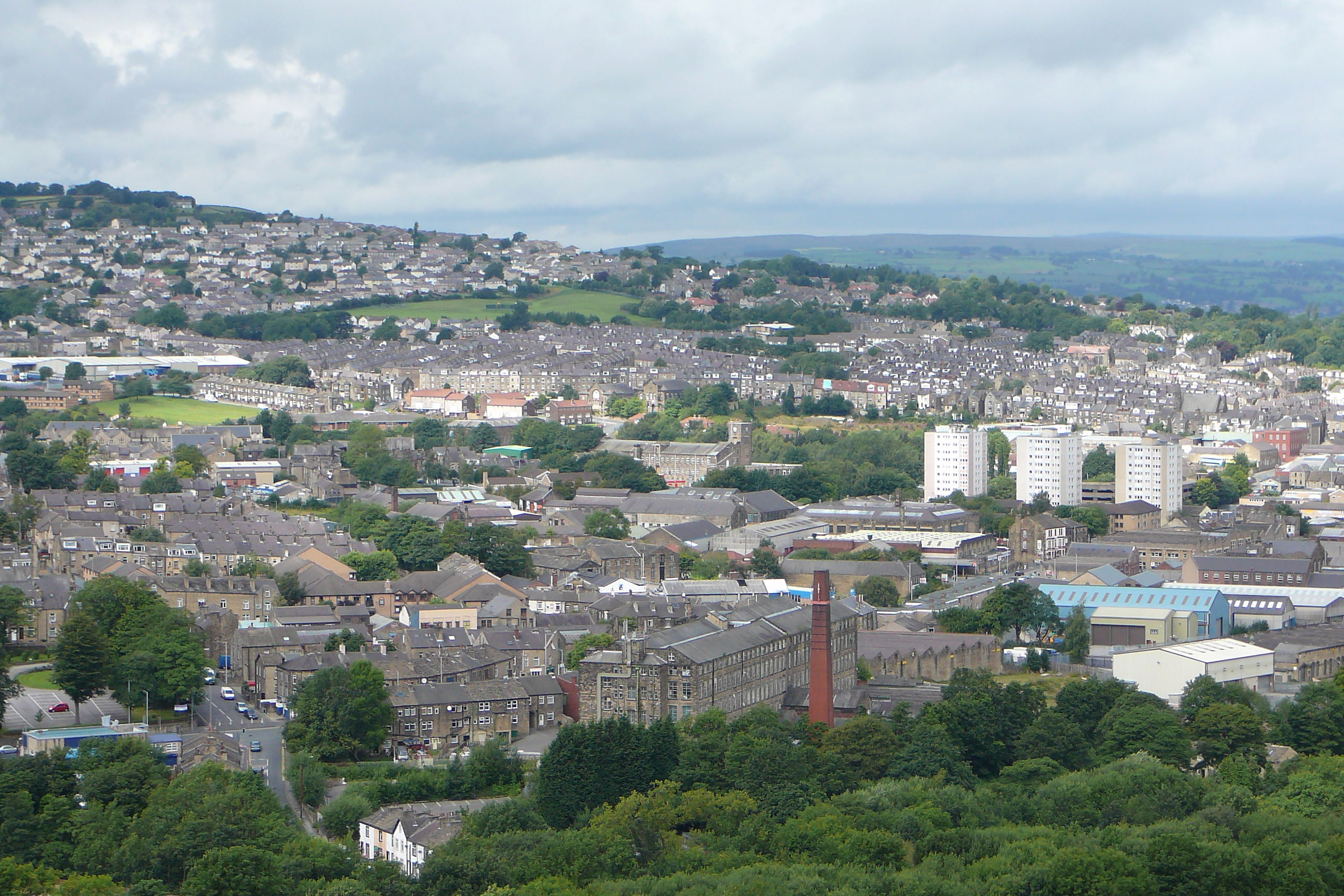
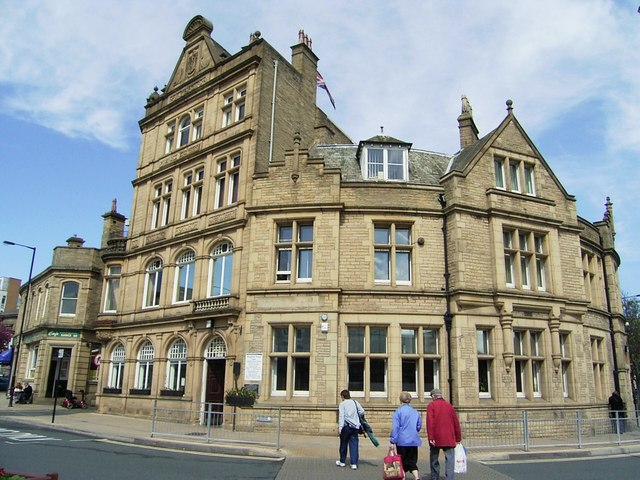
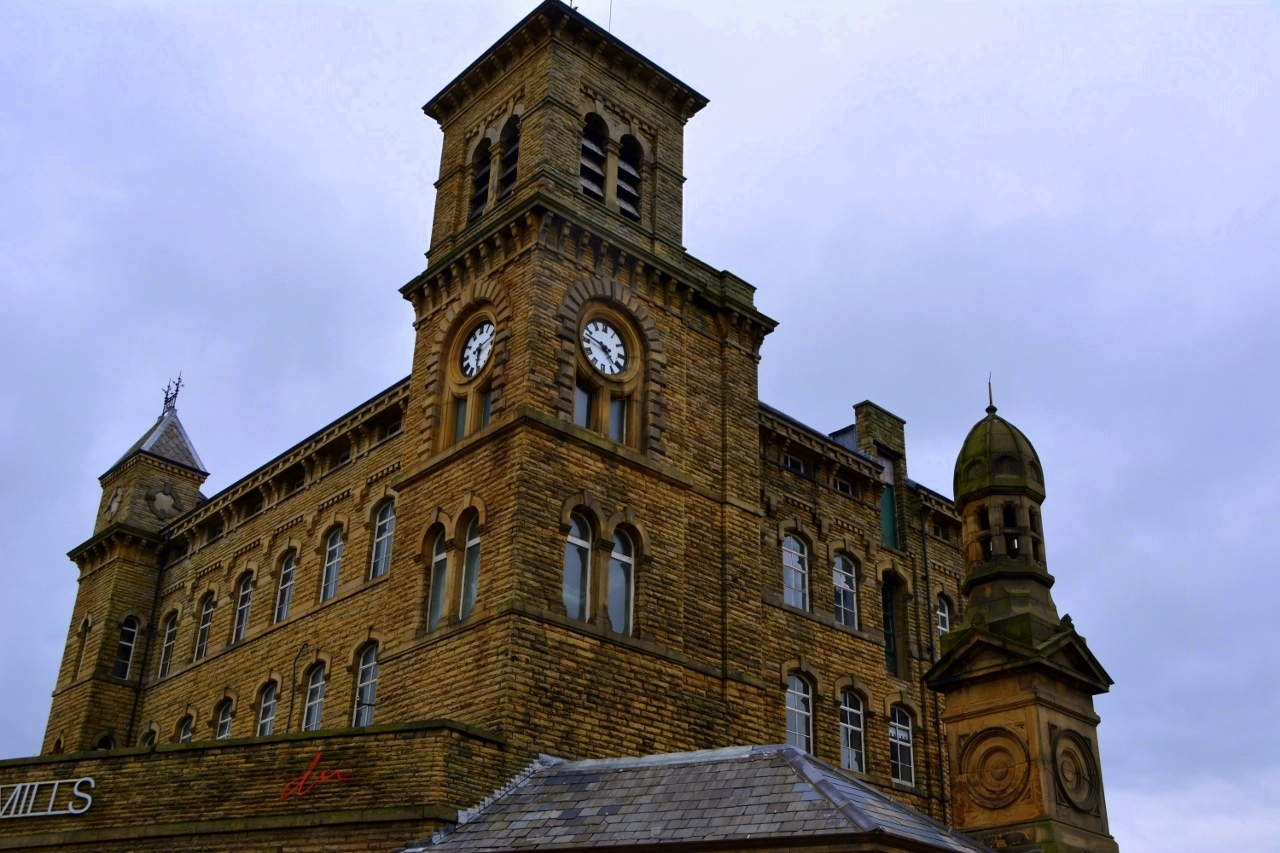
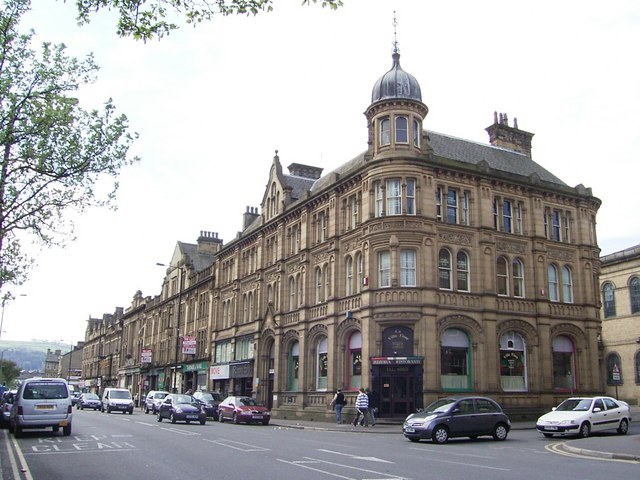
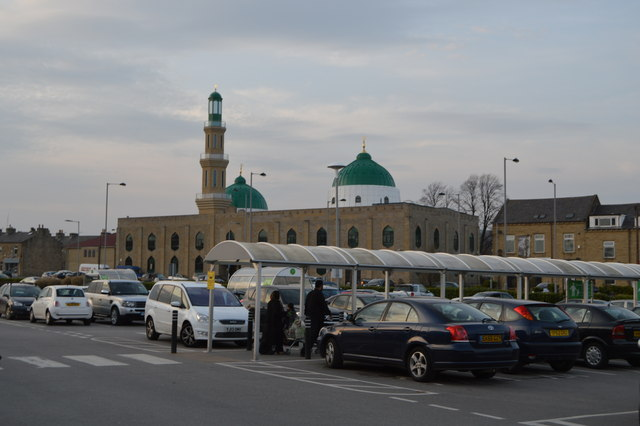
- Clockwise from top : View over Keighley, Dalton Mills, Markazi Jamia Mosque, North Street, Town Hall

- Location within West Yorkshire
- Population: 57,345 (2021 Census)
- OS grid reference: SE058412
- Civil parish: Keighley
- Metropolitan borough: City of Bradford
- Metropolitan county: West Yorkshire
- Region: Yorkshire and the Humber
- Country: England
- Sovereign state: United Kingdom
- Areas of the town: List: Braithwaite; Damems; Hainworth; Ingrow; Long Lee; Thwaites; Utley
- Post town: KEIGHLEY
- Postcode district: BD20, BD21, BD22
- Dialling code: 01535; 01274
- Police: West Yorkshire
- Fire: West Yorkshire
- Ambulance: Yorkshire
- UK Parliament: Keighley and Ilkley

Keighley (/ˈkiːθli/ KEETH-lee) is a market town and a civil parish in the City of Bradford Borough of West Yorkshire, England. It is the second-largest settlement in the borough, after Bradford.

Keighley is 8 miles (13 kilometres) north-west of Bradford, 4 mi (6.5 km) north-west of Bingley, 11 mi (18 km) north of Halifax and 8 mi (13 km) south-east of Skipton. It is governed by Keighley Town Council and Bradford City Council. Keighley is in West Yorkshire, close to the borders of North Yorkshire and Lancashire. Historically in the West Riding of Yorkshire, it lies between Airedale and Keighley Moors. At the 2011 census, Keighley had a population of 56,348.

== History ==
=== Toponymy ===
The name Keighley, which has gone through many changes of spelling throughout its history, means "Cyhha's farm or clearing", and was mentioned in the Domesday Book of 1086: "In Cichhelai, Ulchel, and Thole, and Ravensuar, and William had six carucates to be taxed."

=== Town charter ===
Henry de Keighley, a Lancashire knight, was granted a charter to hold a market in Keighley on 17 October 1305 by King Edward I. The poll tax records of 1379 show that the population of Keighley, in the wapentake of Staincliffe in the West Riding of Yorkshire, was 109 (47 couples and 15 single people).

=== 18th and 19th centuries ===
From 1753, the Union stage coach departed on the Keighley and Kendal Turnpike from what was the Devonshire Arms coaching inn on the corner of Church Street and High Street. Rebuilt about 1789, this public house has a classical style pedimented doorcase with engaged Tuscan columns in the high fashion of that age. The original route towards Skipton was Spring Gardens Lane – Hollins Lane – Hollins Bank Lane. Keighley was to become an intersection with other turnpikes, including the Two-Laws to Keighley branch of the Toller Lane – Blue Bell turnpike (1755) from Bradford to Colne, the Bradford to Keighley turnpike (1814), and the Keighley—Halifax turnpike.

The 1842 Leeds Directory description of Keighley reads, "Its parish had no dependent townships though it is about six miles [10 km] long and four miles [6 km] broad, and comprises 10,160 acres [4,110 ha] of land (including a peaty moor of about 2,000 acres or 800 ha) and a population which amounted, in the year 1801, to 5,745."

==== Christopher Ingham ====
Utley Cemetery contains the grave of Christopher Ingham, a veteran of the conflict against Napoleon. He was a member of the Duke of Wellington's elite 95th Rifle Regiment and fought in ten battles against the French in Spain, France and Belgium, including the Spanish Peninsula War and the Battle of Waterloo, for which he was awarded several medals, including the Peninsula Medal. He died in 1866. Some local historians believe Mr Ingham's heroism may have inspired the author Bernard Cornwell's saga about Major Richard Sharpe. The TV series episode Sharpe's Justice, which focuses on the roots of the title character, is set in and around Keighley.

=== Hindenburg parcel ===
On 22 May 1936, the Zeppelin Hindenburg crossed Yorkshire in a diversion of her normal route between the United States and Germany. As the airship passed over the town, a parcel was dropped and landed in the High Street, where two boys, Jack Gerrard and Alfred Butler, picked it up. The parcel contained a bunch of carnations, a small silver and jet crucifix, some postage stamps, a picture postcard and some Hindenburg notepaper.

The note was written by John P Schulte, who called himself the first flying priest. The note requested that the carnations and crucifix be placed on the grave of his brother, Lieutenant Franz Schulte, who had died of Spanish flu, during the deadly influenza pandemic of 1918, as a Prisoner of War at Raikeswood Prisoner of War Camp, Skipton, originally built as a training camp for the Bradford Pals, in 1915. Schulte was, at that time, buried at Morton Cemetery, two miles (three kilometres) east of Keighley (though the letter stated that he was buried at Skipton, which was incorrect).

To the finder of this letter. Please deposit these flowers and the cross on the grave of my dear brother, Lieutenant Franz Schulte, I. Garde Regt zu Fuss. Prisoner of War in Skipton Cemetery in Keighley near Leeds. Many thanks for your kindness, John P Schulte, the first flying priest. N.B. Please accept the stamps and picture as a small souvenir from me. God bless you!

— Hindenburg note, 22 May 1936

The carnations were placed on the grave and the two boys kept the postage stamps and the postcard. The crucifix was placed in St Anne's Church to avoid it being stolen.

== Governance ==
=== Constituency ===
Keighley is represented in the House of Commons by Conservative Member of Parliament (MP) Robbie Moore, who won the seat by defeating his Labour Party predecessor John Grogan at the 2019 general election. Grogan had a majority of just 249 over the previous incumbent, Conservative Kris Hopkins.

In 2015, Hopkins won the seat at the 2015 general election – securing a second term. Hopkins increased the Conservatives vote share in the area from 41.9% in 2010 to 44.3% in 2015. The Conservatives won the seat in 2010, taking over from Ann Cryer, who had been in office since 1997.

Keighley was contested by the British National Party (BNP) in the May 2005 general election, when the party's leader Nick Griffin stood for Parliament. He was defeated by Ann Cryer, one of a small number of Labour MPs with an increased majority. In March 2006, the town's mayoress, Rose Thompson, announced she had joined the BNP and was immediately dismissed by the mayor Tony Wright.

=== Parish ===
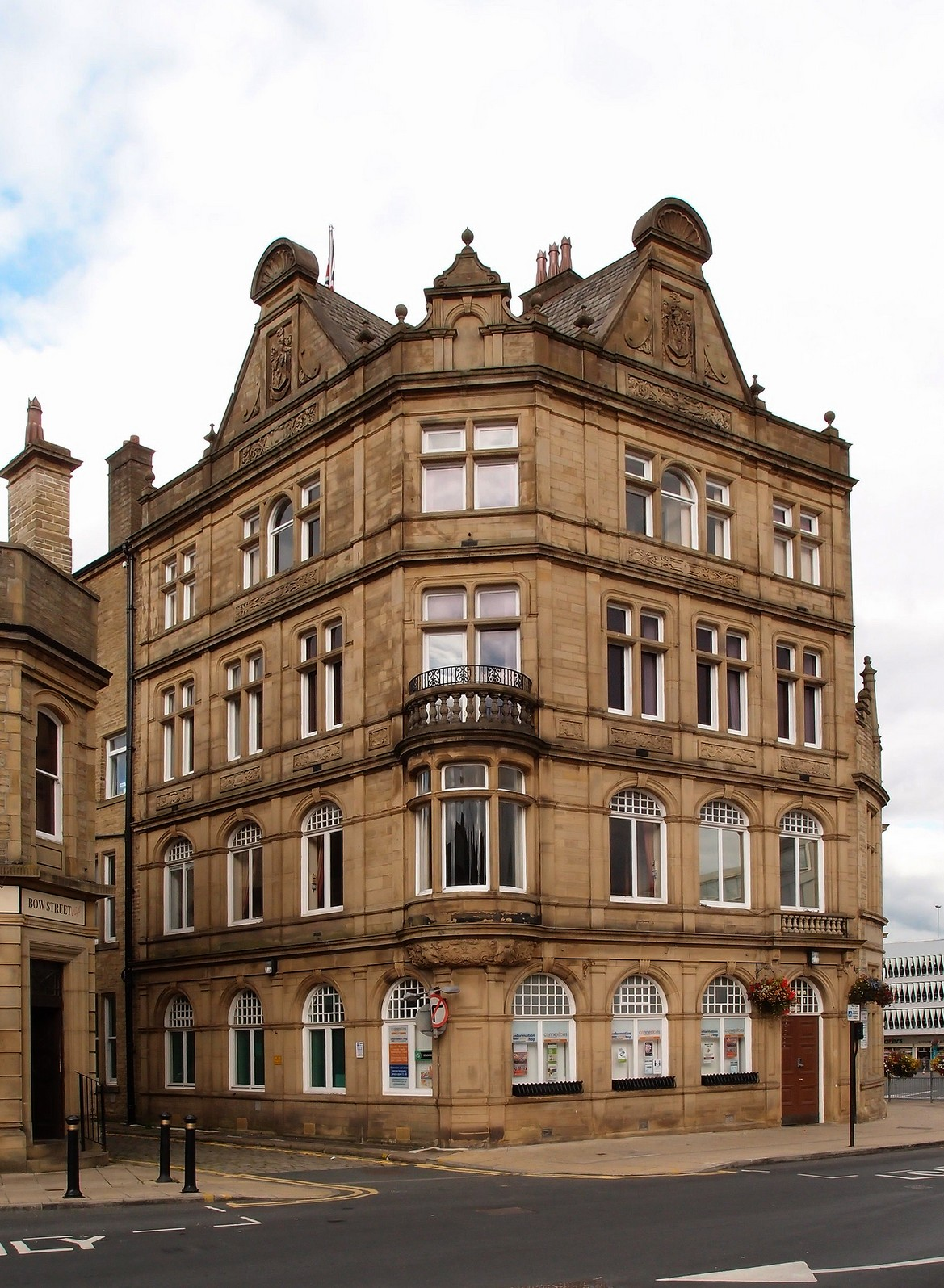
Keighley Town Hall

The town was incorporated as a municipal borough on 28 July 1882 under the provisions of the Municipal Corporations Act 1882 in the West Riding of Yorkshire. In 1938, the boundaries of the borough and civil parish of Keighley were expanded to include the former urban districts and civil parishes of Haworth, Oakworth and Oxenhope, along with the parish of Morton from the abolished Keighley Rural District and a small part of the Bingley urban district.

On 1 April 1974, Keighley borough became part of the City of Bradford Metropolitan District in accordance with the Local Government Act 1972 in the newly formed county of West Yorkshire. The merger caused a lot of bitterness among Keighley people, who resented being 'taken over' by Bradford and accused the city's council of neglecting the town. Civil parish status was restored to Keighley in 2002, providing it with its own town council.

The council's 30 members elect a mayor from amongst their number once a year. The parish boundaries are based on but not identical to the pre-1938 borough boundaries. In June 2006, the leader of Bradford District Council, Conservative Councillor Kris Hopkins, was quoted in the Craven Herald & Pioneer as suggesting it might be a good idea for Keighley to become an independent authority once again. The town has a local history society, Keighley and District Local History Society, and a family history society, Keighley and District Family History Society.

=== Arms ===
Coat of arms of Keighley

Notes
Originally granted February 1883 to Keighley Borough Council
Crest
On a wreath of the colours in front of a dragon's head erased Gules entwined by a serpent Or a fountain Proper.
Escutcheon
Argent on a fess Sable between three stags' heads caboshed a Fountain proper all within a Bordure embattled Azure.
Motto
By Worth

== Geography ==
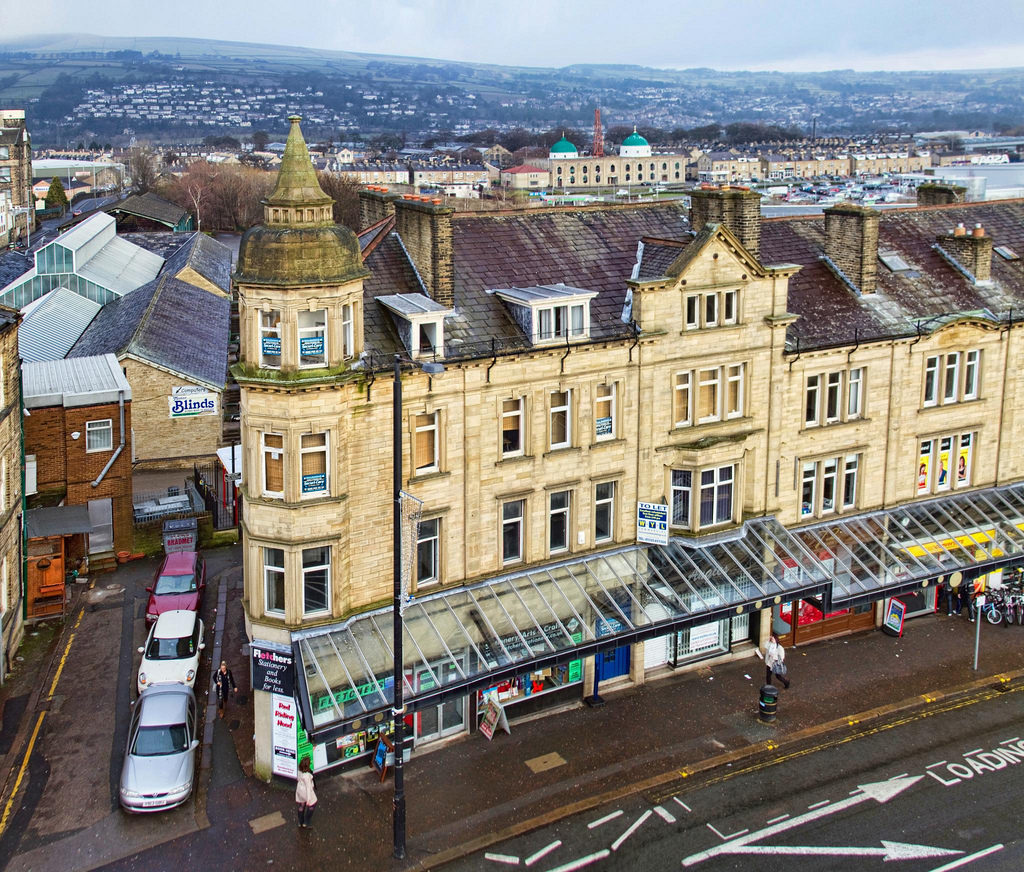
Victorian era terraced buildings on Cavendish Street

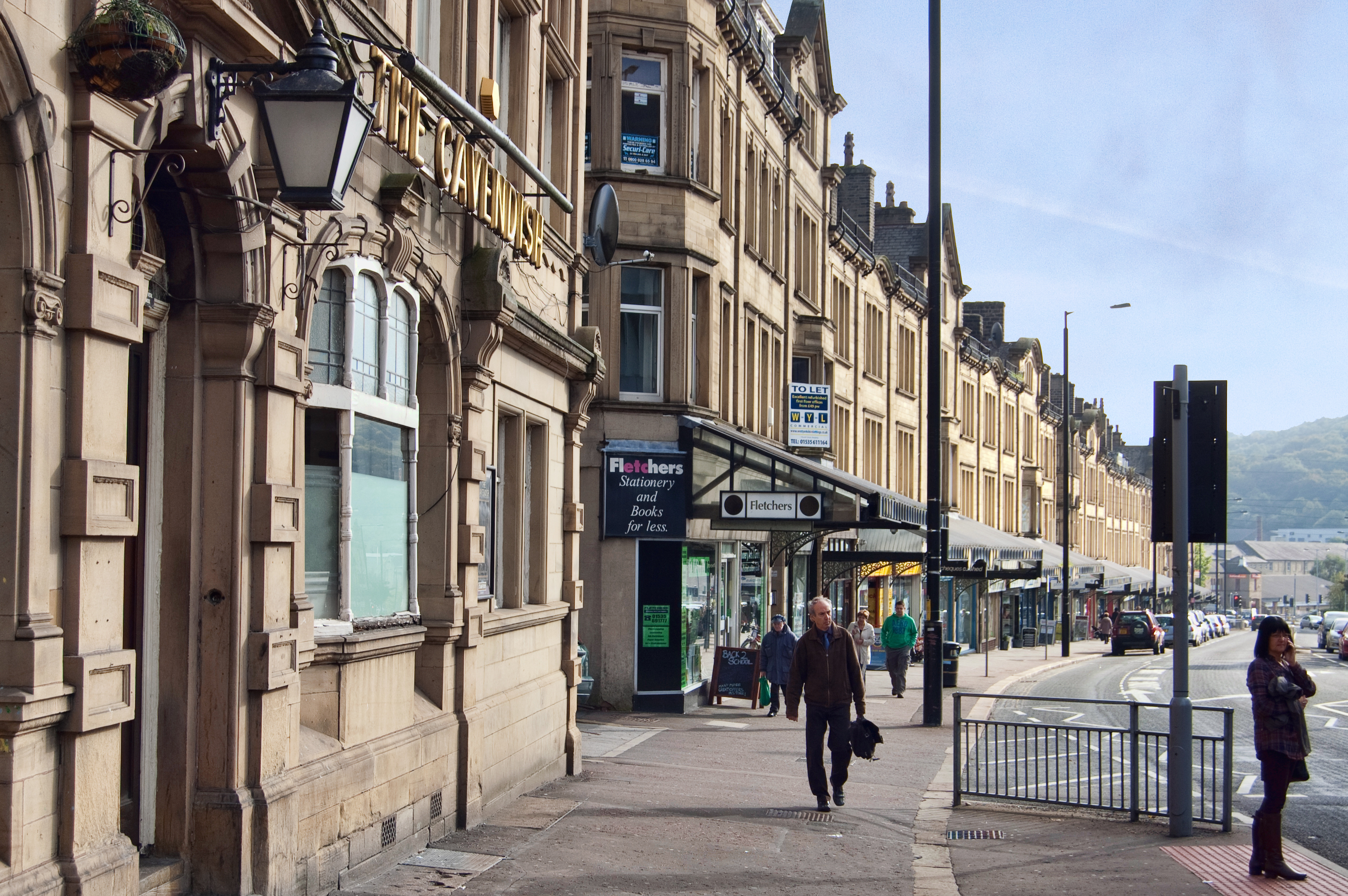
A ground-level view of the Victorian commercial quarter

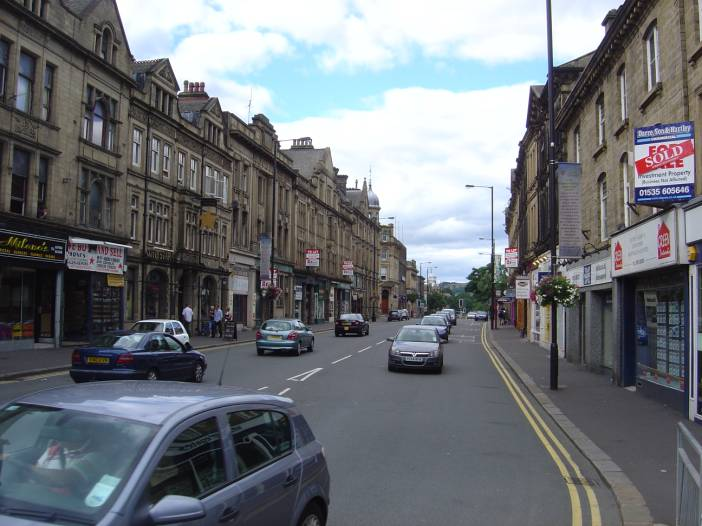
North Street

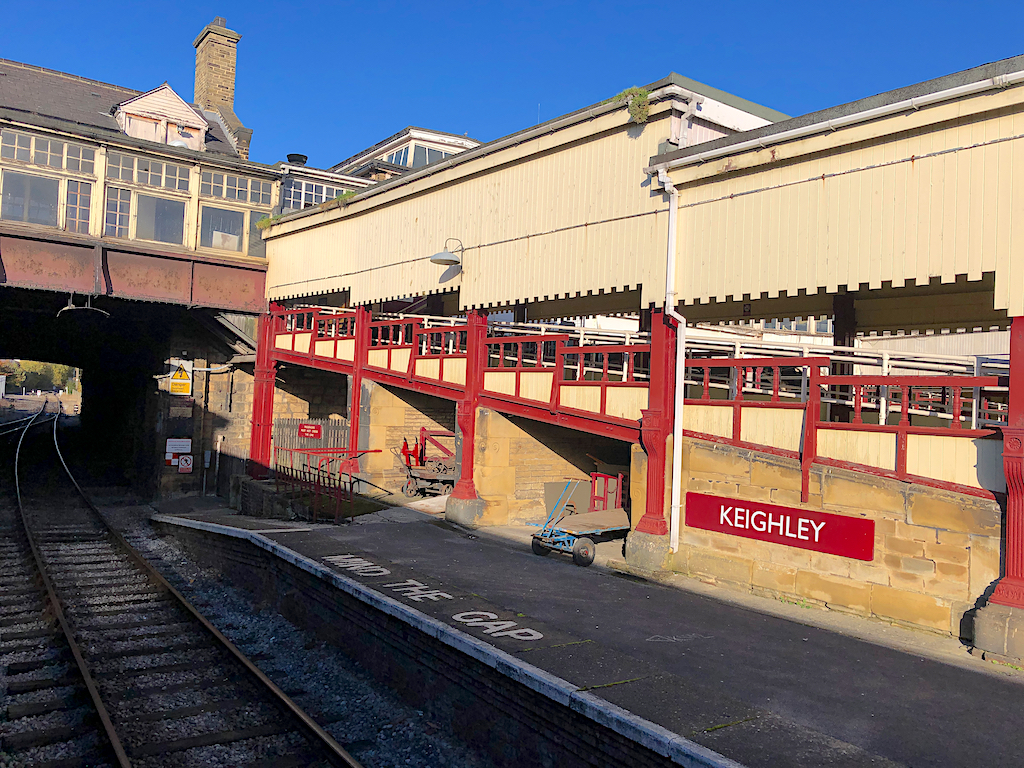
Keighley railway station

Keighley lies at the confluence of the rivers Worth and Aire in Airedale, in the South Pennines. It benefits from an electrified railway service with connections to Leeds, Bradford, Shipley, Bingley, Skipton, Carlisle and Morecambe.

The post town of Keighley's northern boundary is with Bradley and its southern limit is the edge of Oxenhope. To the west, the town advances up the hill to the suburb of Black Hill, and in the east it terminates at the residential neighbourhoods of Long Lee and Thwaites Brow. The outlying north-eastern suburb of Riddlesden is sometimes incorrectly referred to as a separate village but is part of the town.

Past Black Hill and via Braithwaite Edge Road lies Braithwaite village, which leads to Laycock, which was also mentioned in the Domesday Book. Laycock is a conservation area which overlooks the hamlet of Goose Eye.

The River Aire passes through north-eastern Keighley, dividing the neighbourhood of Stockbridge and running roughly parallel to the Leeds and Liverpool Canal. The Worth links up with the Aire in Stockbridge and runs south-westerly, dividing eastern Keighley from central and western districts of the town. The Worth is lined with abandoned, semi-derelict industrial sites and tracts of waste ground dating from the period when Keighley thrived as a major textile centre.

Parts of Keighley are prone to flooding, and the town was particularly badly hit by floods in 2000. Since then, millions have been spent on strengthening flood defences.

Other outlying villages around the town are Oakworth, Cross Roads, Haworth, Stanbury and Oxenhope. The two main settlements to the north are Silsden and Steeton. Although these villages are often referred to as separate places, they are part of the wider Keighley area. These areas add a total of 22,669 people to the Keighley area, taking the population of the wider Keighley area up to 74,098 (2001 Census).

To the north-east is Rombalds Moor, which contains many signs of Stone Age and Bronze Age occupation, including cup and ring marks; as it drops back down into Wharfedale and the town of Ilkley, approximately five miles away, it becomes the more famous Ilkley Moor.

== Demography ==
Census population of the ancient parish/civil parish of Keighley
Year	1801	1811	1821	1831	1841	1851	1861	1871	1881	1891
Population	5,745	6,864	9,223	11,176	13,413	18,259	18,819	24,704	30,395	36,176
Source: Vision of Britain – Keighley AP/CP: Total Population.

Census population of the municipal borough of Keighley
Year	1901	1911	1921	1931	1939 †	1951	1961	1971	2011
Population	41,564	43,487	41,921	40,441	56,631	56,944	55,845	55,325	56,348
Source: Vision of Britain – Keighley MB: Total Population.

† The 1939 population is estimated from the National Registration Act figures. The 1941 census did not take place because of the Second World War.

== Economy ==
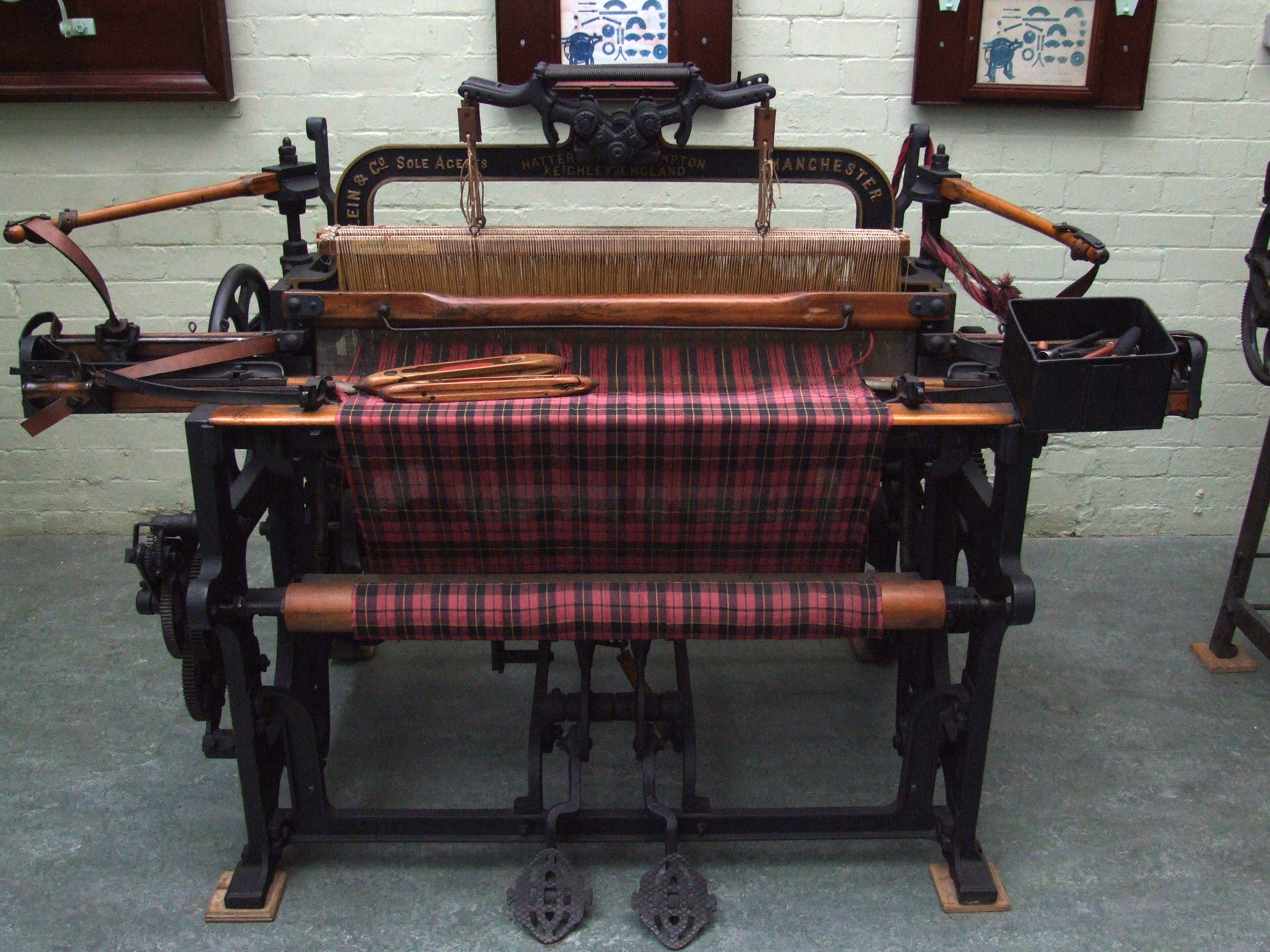
Hattersley Domestic Loom built by Geo. Hattersley Keighley on display at Queen Street Mill Textile Museum, Burnley

The town's industries have typically been in textiles, particularly wool and cotton processing. In addition to the manufacture of textiles, there were several large factories making textile machinery. These included Dean, Smith & Grace, George Hattersley & Son, and Prince, Smith & Stell. The first of these operated as a manufacturer of CNC machine tools, particularly precision lathes, until 2008.

Keighley is home to Timothy Taylor Brewery, the makers of CAMRA, Champion Beer of Britain award-winning ales Landlord and Boltmaker (previously known as 'Best Bitter'). They also brew Landlord Dark (previously known as Ram Tam), Golden Best, Dark Mild, Knowle Spring and a French style blonde ale, Le Champion, which was first brewed for the Tour de France in 2014 and has been brewed for the Tour de Yorkshire in 2015 and 2016. A new light refreshing session IPA called Hopical Storm appeared in 2020. They also own many pubs in the area, including the Albert Hotel, Boltmakers Arms, Taylor’s on the Green, Royal Oak and The Fleece Inn in Haworth.

== Community and culture ==
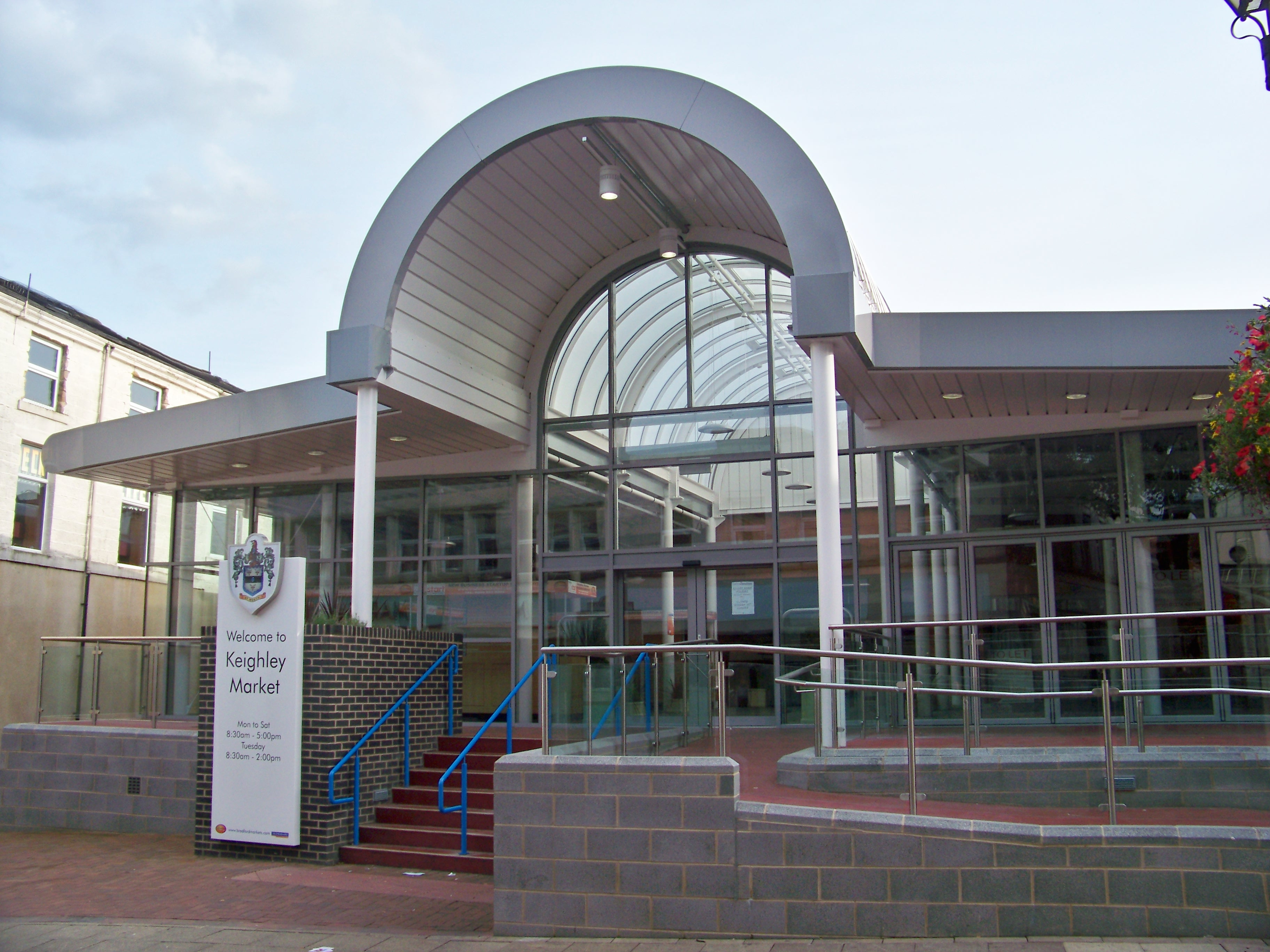
Keighley Market Hall

"On-street trading took place in Keighley, around the Church Green area, for 500 years before the establishment of a formal market in 1833. The market was situated at the west end of Low Street. This area was redeveloped in the late 1960s and a purpose-built covered market hall was constructed...The new building was opened by Keighley town mayor Sydney Bancroft in June, 1971."

Much of the town centre has been pedestrianised. Keighley has Keighley Market Hall, four large supermarkets, Morrisons, Sainsbury's, Aldi and Asda. There are several budget supermarkets situated in small retail parks around the town.

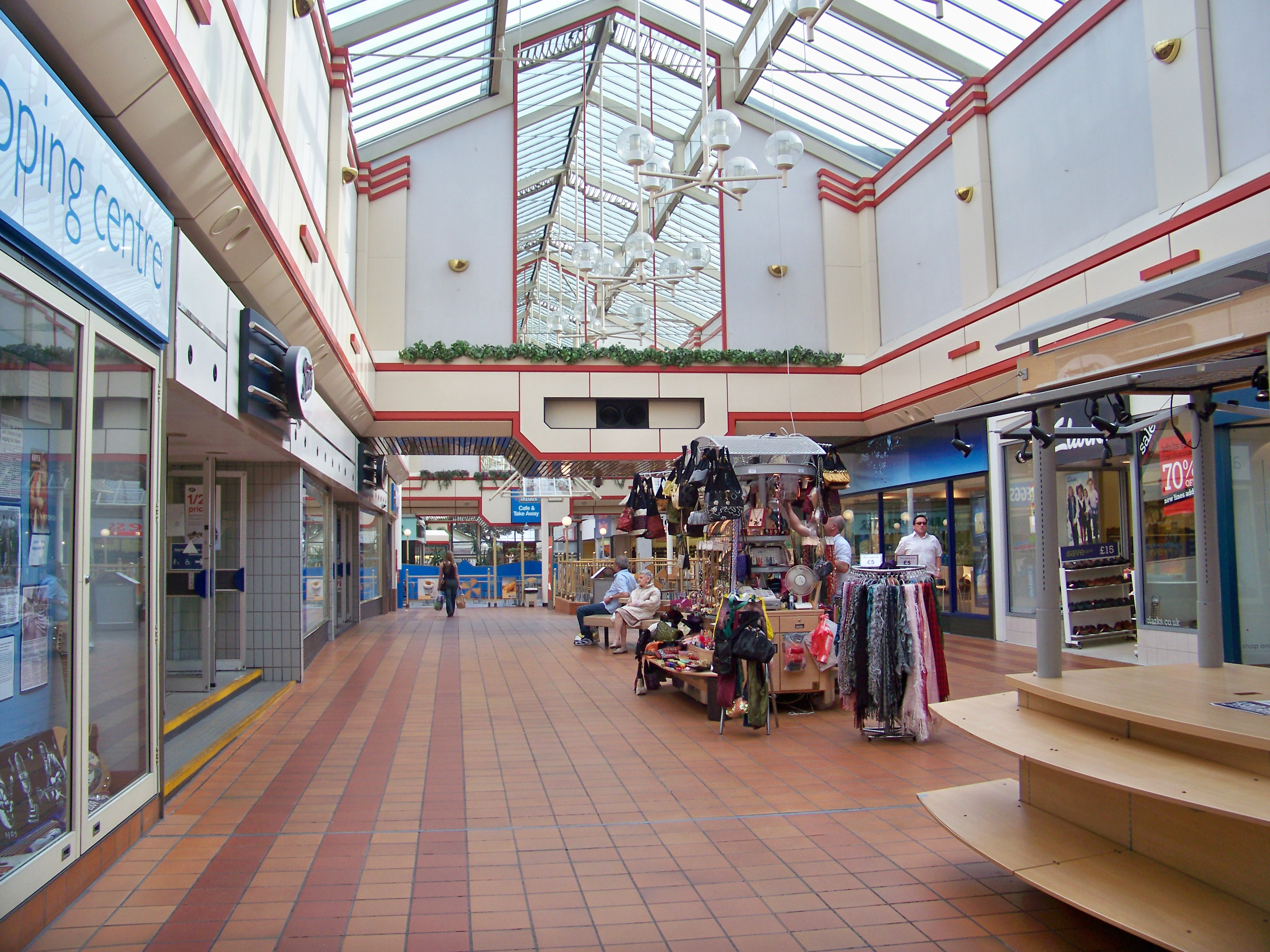
Airedale Centre

The Airedale shopping centre is a large indoor shopping precinct which houses most of the town's high street retail chains. The Airedale Shopping Centre housed the 12-foot-tall (3.7 m) statue of the giant Rombald holding a boulder above his head. It was moved to a different part of the centre when a glass ceiling was added to the whole complex. A public consultation favoured placing the statue on the Beechcliffe roundabout on the A650 road approaching Keighley from the east. According to local legend, the giant Rombald threw a giant rock at his enemies (or in some versions of the tale his wife) killing them. The rock is the "calf" of "cow and calf" rock fame, which can be seen today at the top of Rombald's Moor on Ilkley Moor.

Keighley has one cinema, The Picture House on North Street. It opened in 1913, making it one of the oldest in Britain. A brief closure in the mid-1990s prevented it from being listed as one of the oldest in continuous operation – a record that goes to the Curzon Cinema, which opened in Clevedon, Somerset, in 1911. It was restored from its derelict condition in 1996 by Northern Morris Associated Cinemas and operates to this day.

Keighley has a popular local music scene. There have been various venues where local bands play. Most notable was the now-defunct CJ's bar (also known as Chrome, VW's, Cheese and Trumpet) that played host to many popular touring bands. Examples of local bands are the Sailmakers, the Undecided, Foxes Faux, Random Hand, the Get Guns, Eyesore Angels and Dead Message, who recently parted ways after 9 years. The British rock bands Skeletal Family and Terrorvision were also originally formed in Keighley.

== Media ==
Local news and television programmes are provided by BBC Yorkshire and ITV Yorkshire. Television signals are received from the local TV transmitter. Keighley's local radio stations are BBC Radio Leeds on 102.7 FM, Heart Yorkshire on 107.6 FM, Capital Yorkshire on 105.6 FM, Hits Radio West Yorkshire on 97.5 FM, Greatest Hits Radio West Yorkshire on 96.3 FM, and Rombalds Radio, a community based radio station that broadcast online. Local newspapers are the Keighley News and Telegraph & Argus.

=== Town twinning ===
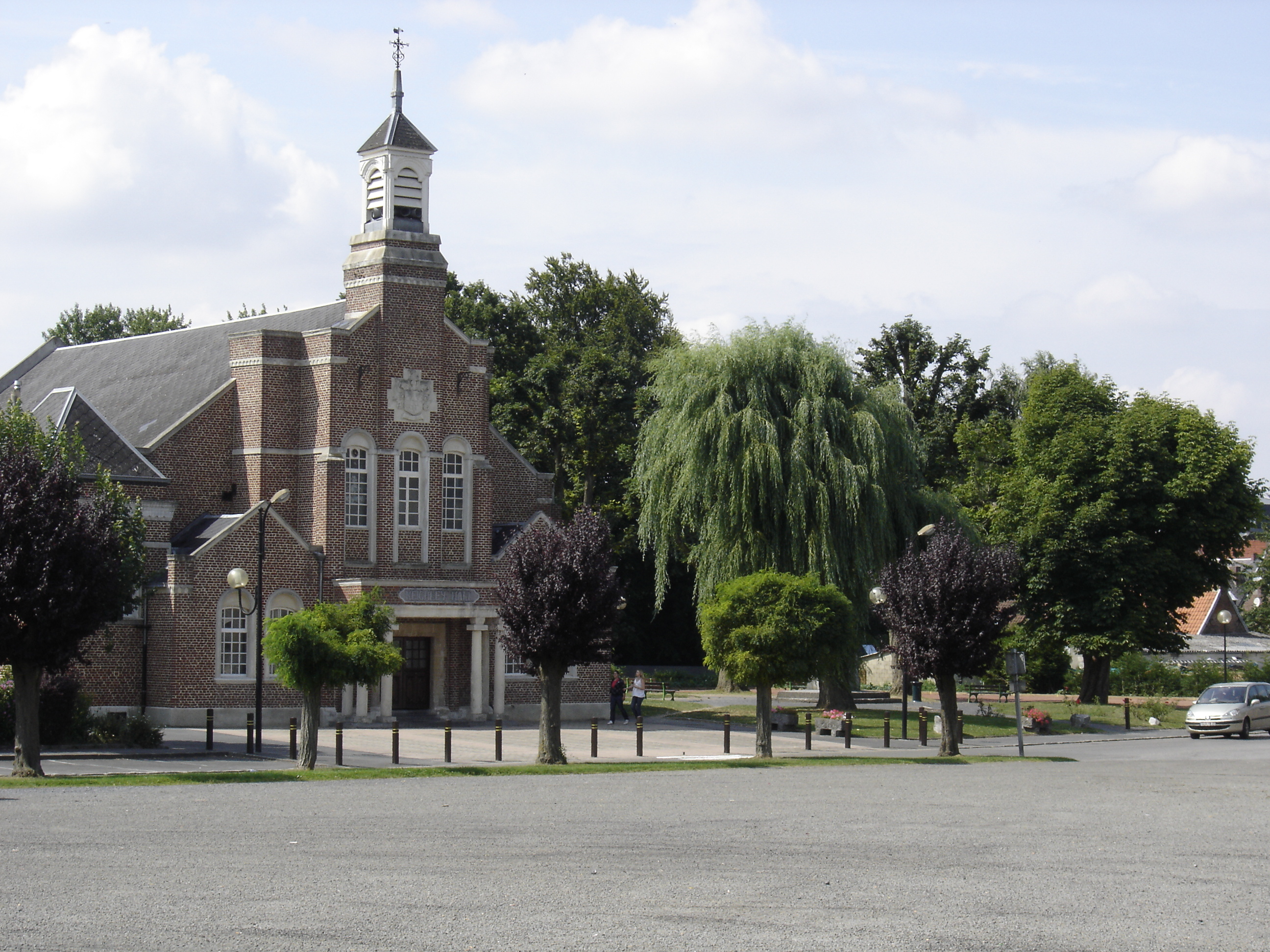
Keighley Hall in Poix-du-Nord

Keighley has the unique record of having the first recorded town twinning agreement in the world, having entered into an agreement with Poix-du-Nord, France in 1920. This actually followed an even earlier sister city arrangement with two communes on the outskirts of Paris, France – Suresnes and Puteaux – starting in 1905.

- Poix-du-Nord, Nord, Hauts-de-France, France
- Myrtle Beach, South Carolina, US
- Manzini, Eswatini

== Landmarks ==
=== Architecture ===
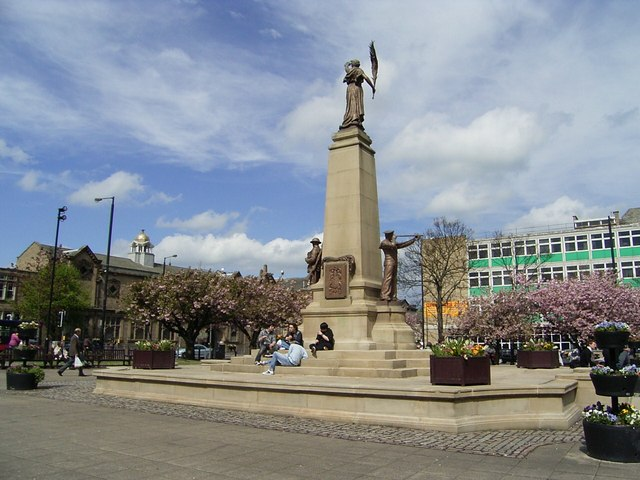
Keighley War Memorial

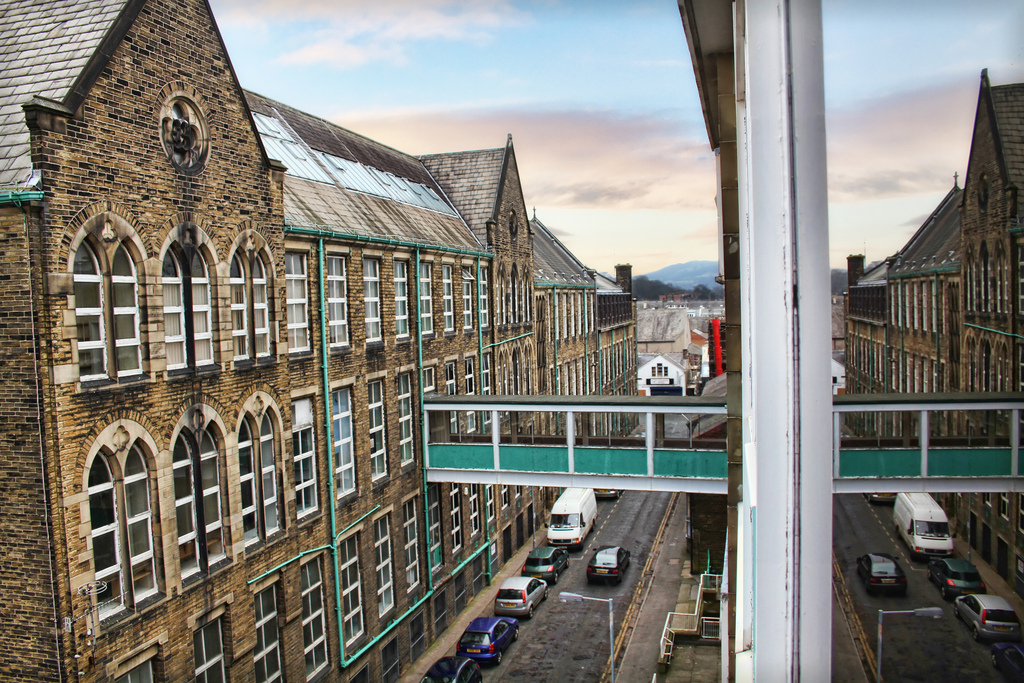
Former Mechanics' Institute on Lord Street

Like many other British towns and cities, Keighley was extensively remodelled in the 1960s and lost many historic buildings. However, the town managed to retain some of its heritage and has many Victorian buildings. The local millstone grit gives many of the buildings a distinctive look.

East Riddlesden Hall, Cliffe Castle Museum and Whinburn Mansion are fine country houses. There are large townhouses along Skipton Road, which contrast with the rows of smaller terraces in the streets behind them, although many of these larger buildings have since been converted into flats and bedsits.

The town's central library was the first Carnegie library in England, opened in 1904 with a grant of £10,000 from Andrew Carnegie. The library has undergone refurbishment, which was completed in 2007. Many of the town's former mill buildings are still intact.

The town centre contains modern buildings, such as Leeds City College, and examples of Victorian commercial architecture, including the long terrace of Cavendish Street with its 1/8-mile (0.20 km) ornamental canopy. There is a bus station which opened in 2002 near the Airedale Shopping Centre. There are several tower blocks in Parkwood Rise, Holycroft and Ingrow and a central multi-storey car park.

Amongst the modern houses in Laycock, two miles (three kilometres) outside Keighley town centre, is a 17th-century, three-storey manor house (which is said to be the former wing of a much bigger property), converted barns and 18th-century cottages.

=== Attractions ===
On the outskirts of town is Cliffe Hall, also known as Cliffe Castle, now Keighley Museum.

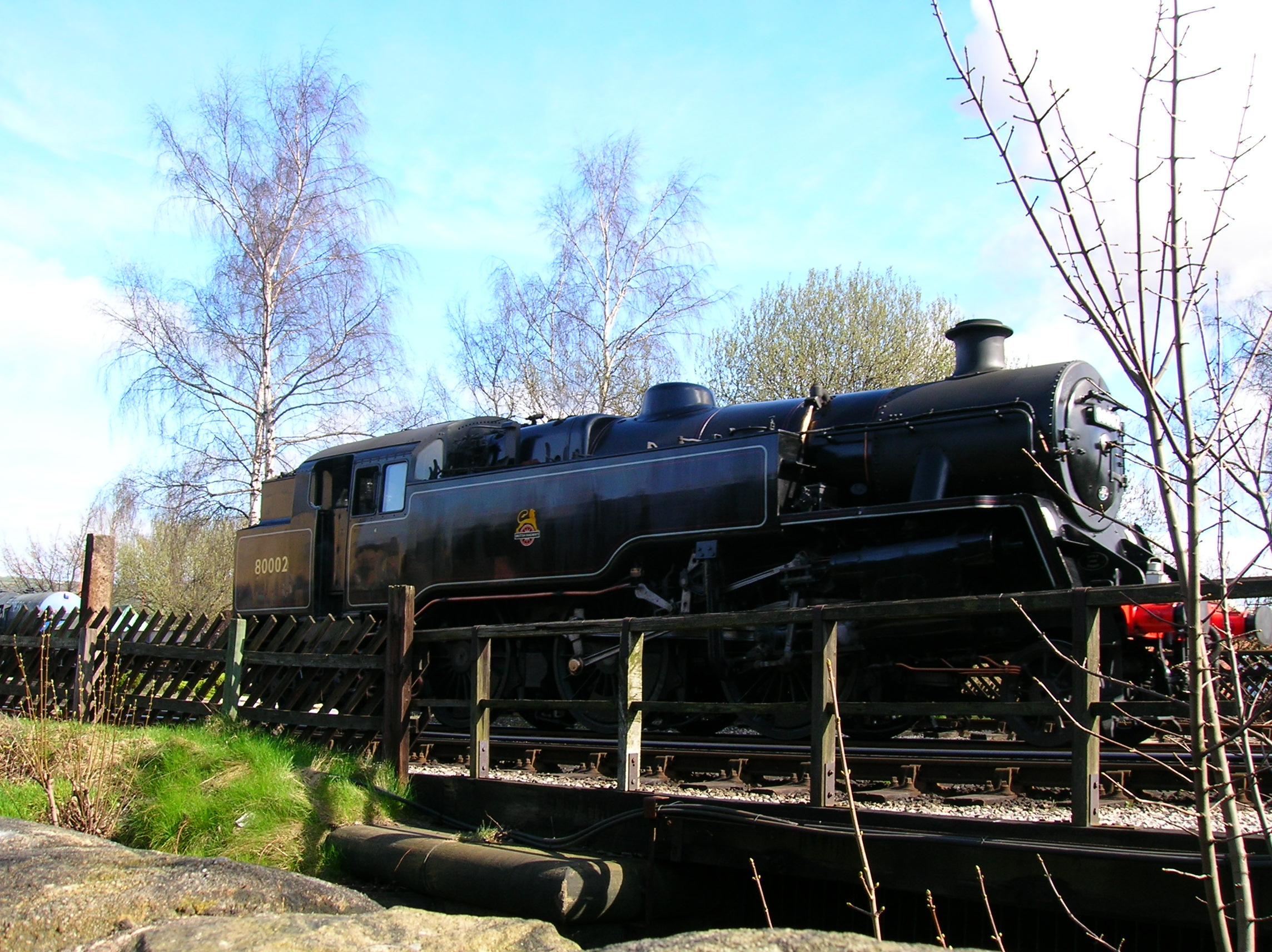
Locomotive on the Keighley & Worth Valley Railway

The Keighley and Worth Valley railway is a heritage steam railway, which links the town with Haworth, Oakworth, Oxenhope and the Bronte Country. Keighley is the location of the Keighley and Worth Valley Railway, a heritage railway that passes through Haworth (part of the Brontë Country, home of Anne, Charlotte and Emily Brontë) and terminates at Oxenhope. At Ingrow is the Museum of Rail Travel.

Top Withens and the Brontë Waterfall are within walking distance of Stanbury, a mile and a half from Haworth. East Riddlesden Hall is in Riddlesden. Keighley Police Museum is in the Keighley Civic Centre opposite the Town Square. The old police station has many pieces of police memorabilia, including a Victorian horse-drawn Black Mariah.

== Education ==
Local high schools are Carlton Keighley in Utley, Beckfoot Oakbank, Parkside School in Cullingworth and the Holy Family Catholic School.

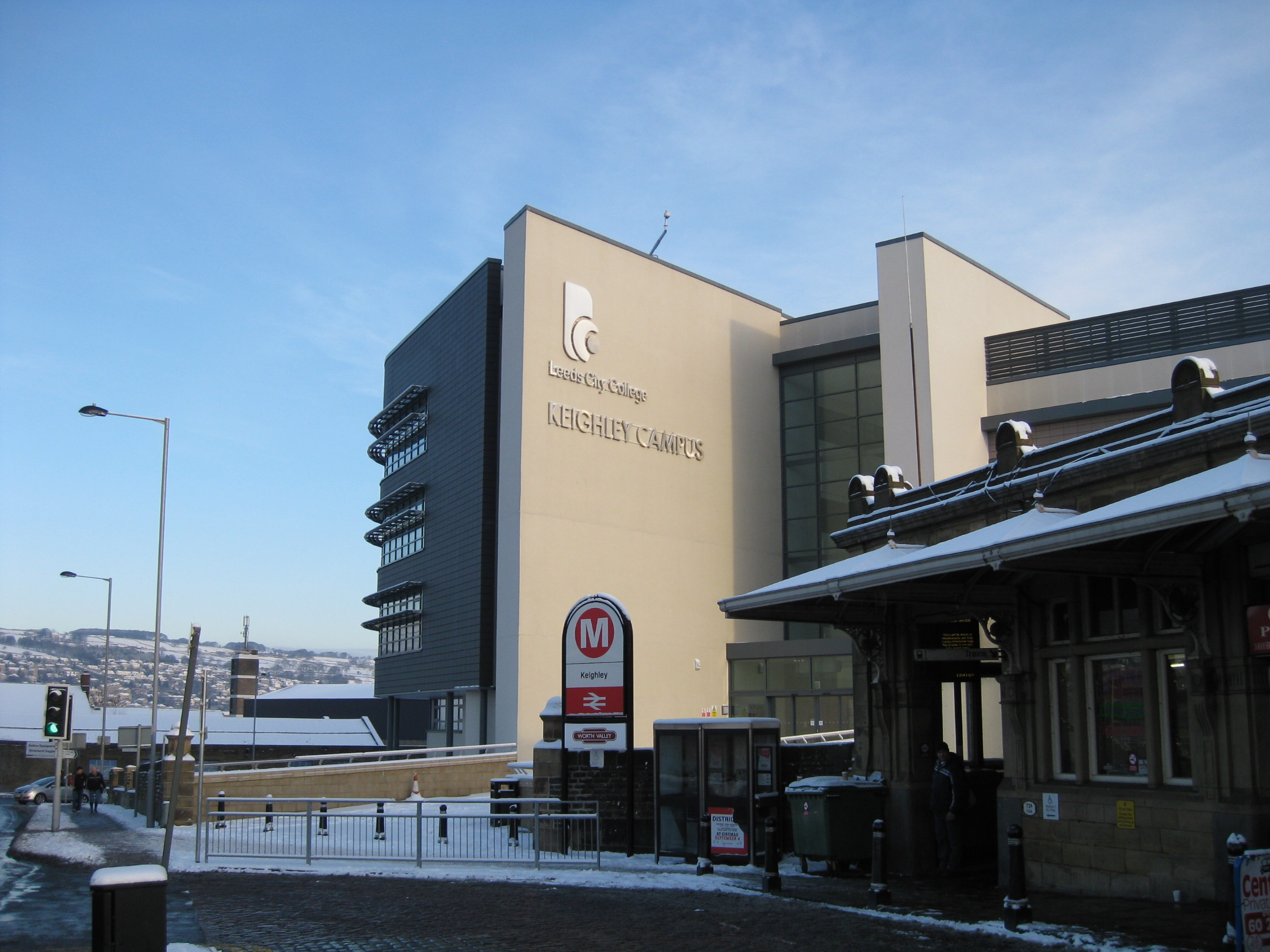
Keighley College buildings in 2010

Keighley College, formerly the local campus of Leeds City College, itself formerly known as Park Lane College, is situated near Keighley railway station on Bradford Road. In 2010, the college opened this new £30 million campus, moving away from the former site on Cavendish Street, which was in need of repair and has since been demolished. The college includes an Industrial Centre of Excellence and a nationally acclaimed Star Centre facility, designed to encourage more young people to study STEM subjects (science, technology, engineering, and mathematics). This features a mock mission control centre, a planetarium, a simulated rocky planet surface and many other space-related items.

== Religion ==
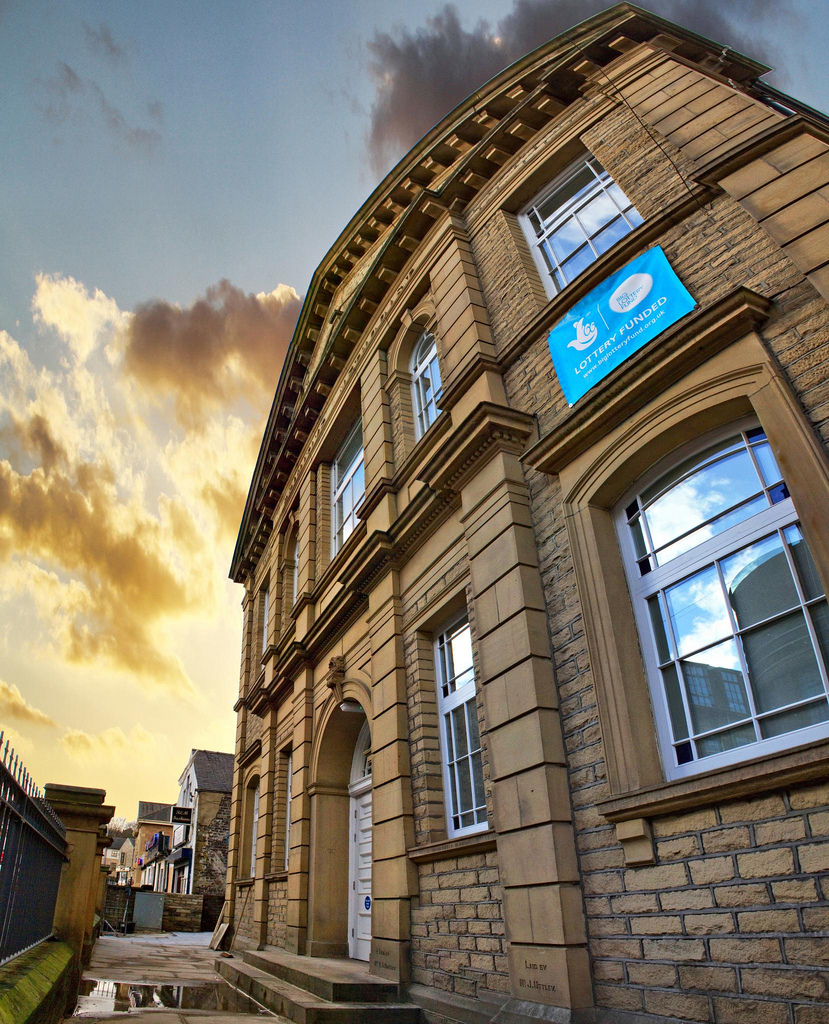
Central Hall, an old Methodist chapel converted to a community resource centre by infrastructure support group KIVCA

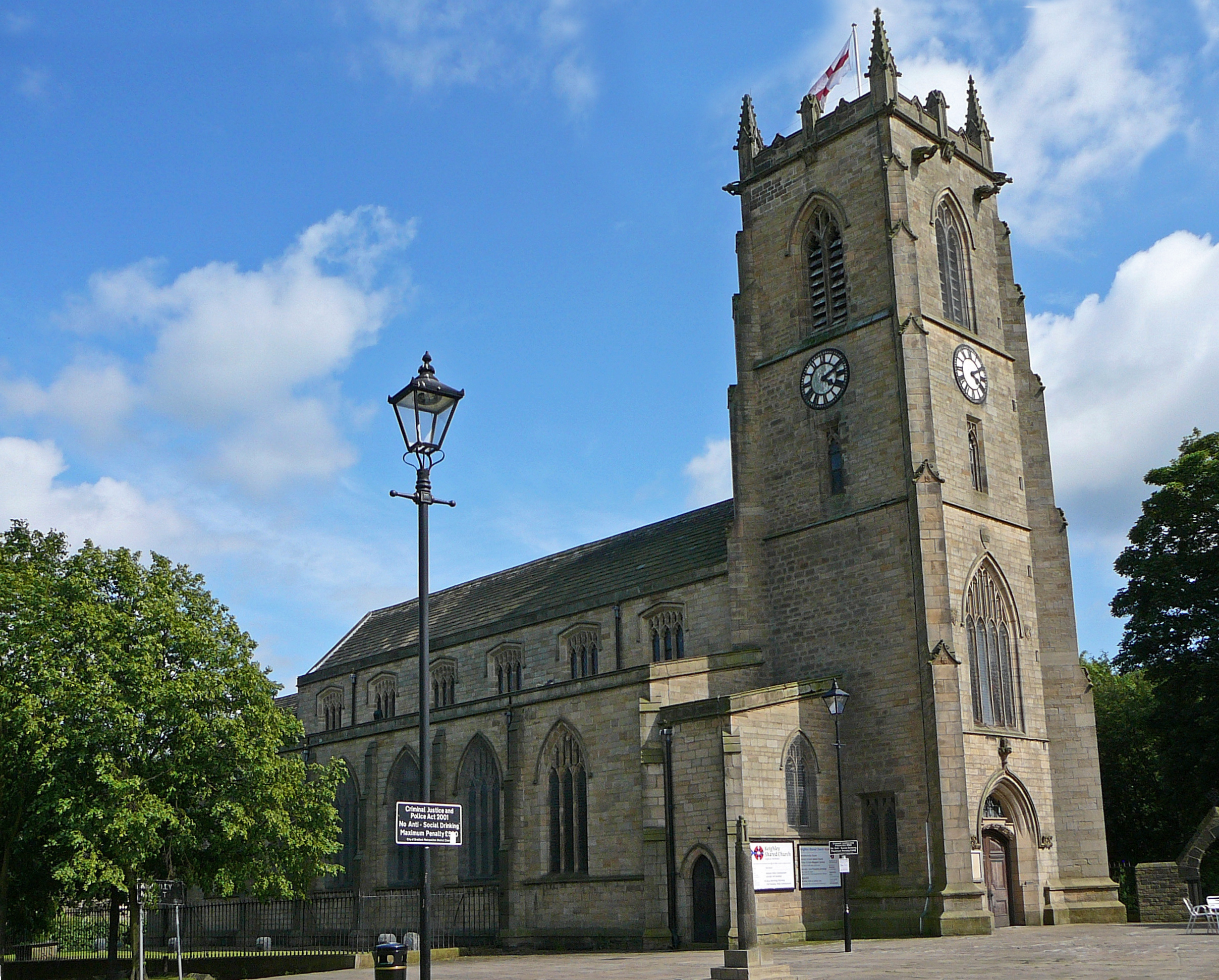
Keighley Shared Church, the parish church of Keighley

Keighley has a parish church, Keighley Shared Church, and is home to many Christian denominations. It has churches and places of worship for Anglicans, Methodists, United Reformed, Mormons, Quakers, Salvation Army and Jehovah's Witnesses. Keighley has a significant Roman Catholic, minority re-established following the repeal of the penal laws. The Catholic population was boosted in the mid-19th century with the arrival of Irish immigrants escaping the 1840s Great Famine, who came to work in the textile and weaving industries. Keighley has two Roman Catholic churches (St Anne's – 1840 and St Joseph's – 1934) and four Roman Catholic schools (St Anne's – 1857, St Joseph's – 1922, Our Lady of Victories – 1960 and Holy Family – 1964).

The first spiritualist church in Britain was founded at Keighley in 1853 by David Richmond, who, although not originally from the town, stayed for many years and helped to establish the movement throughout the country. Spiritualism was at its height during Victorian times and Keighley Spiritualist Church (Heber Street Spiritualist Church) remains open.

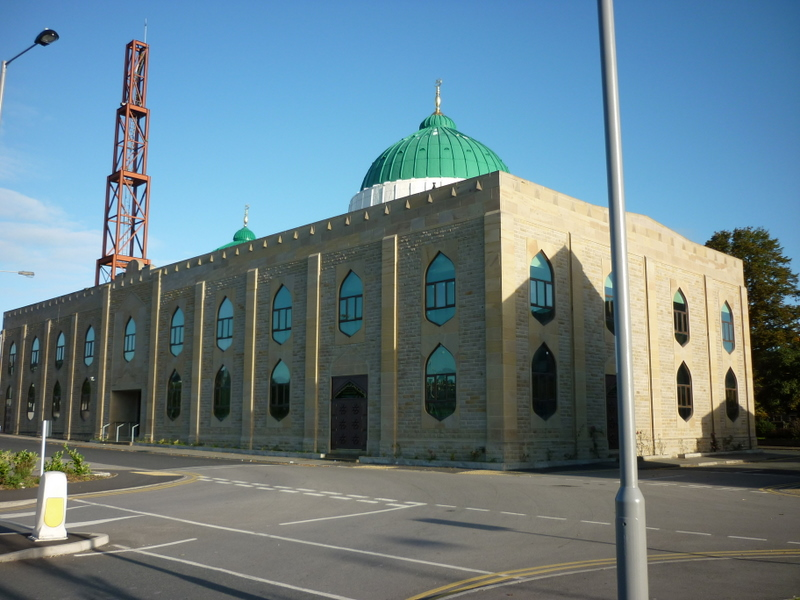
The mosque on Bradford Street

Muslims make up the second-largest religious group in the town. According to the 2011 census, there were more than 12,400 Muslims in Keighley in March of that year. Most had started coming to Britain in the 1960s from the Mirpur region of Azad Kashmir, in Pakistan, and the Sylhet region of Bangladesh. As of 2013, there were eight mosques in Keighley, including the purpose-built Markazi Jamia Masjid ('Central Community Mosque') in Emily Street and the purpose-built Jamia Masjid Ghosiyah (Ghosiyah Community Mosque – named after the saint Abdul Qadir Jilani), on Skipton Road. The rest are buildings which have been converted into Mosques, with the oldest being the Shahjalal Jami Masjid and Jamiah Quraniah (ShahJalal Community Mosque and Quran Teaching School – named after the saint Shah Jalal), on Temple Row, which was previously the Wesleyan Methodist Church, 1845–46.

There is a Buddhist centre on Lawkholme Crescent, in the town centre. The Keighley Kadampa Buddhist Centre is used by lay and ordained Buddhist practitioners and also runs day and evening classes for newcomers to the faith.

== Sport ==
Keighley Cougars are a semi-professional rugby league team based at Royd Ings Avenue. The ground's historical name is Lawkholme Lane but has been known as Cougar Park since 1992. Keighley RUFC rugby union team are based at Rose Cottage, Utley, and play in the amateur Yorkshire Second Division.

Keighley Central F.C., was a football club that won the Yorkshire Football League Division 3 title in 1964.

On 6 July 2014, Stage 2 of the 2014 Tour de France from York to Sheffield, passed through the town. It was also the location of the stage's intermediate sprint after 42.6 miles (68.6 km). The 20 points for the Points jersey was claimed by Blel Kadri of AG2R La Mondiale.

Keighley Town FC, formally Eccleshill United, relocated to Keighley and adopted their current name in 2026. They are currently members of the Northern Counties East League Premier Division and play at Cougar Park.

== Filmography ==
=== Film ===
Keighley was the setting for the film Blow Dry, starring Josh Hartnett, Alan Rickman and Bill Nighy. Blow Dry opens with the announcement that the small town of Keighley will host the year 2000 British Hair Championships. Keighley's mayor (Warren Clarke) is thrilled about the news, but when he announces it to the town's press, they all yawn disapprovingly. The film, although set in Keighley, was shot in several locations.

Most of the 2004 film Yasmin was shot in Keighley. Written by Simon Beaufoy and mostly filmed in Lawkholme, it tells the story of a British Muslim woman who has her life disrupted by the impact of the September 11 attacks on America. Beaufoy said the film was originally set in Oldham, but "worked its way across the Pennines".

The Keighley and Worth Valley Railway (KWVR), running steam trains from Keighley to Haworth and Oxenhope, has been used in several films, including The Railway Children, Yanks, the film of the Pink Floyd musical The Wall and an episode of the long-running situation comedy, The Last of the Summer Wine. A Touch of Frost, starring David Jason, was also filmed at the railway line close to Ingrow West.

The 1950s set British feature film Between Two Women (2000) was filmed extensively in and around Keighley and its mills, in particular around the railway and close to the main town railway station. The same director's next film, The Jealous God, (2005) also featured Keighley railway station and nearby streets.

The film God's Own Country about the young life of a sheep farmer was filmed in Laycock and also at Keighley bus station

=== Television ===
The 2004 documentary Edge of the City, about the City of Bradford Social Services, and the people and problems they deal with, was partly filmed in Keighley, and concerned sexual abuse of underage white girls by some Asian men.

A great part of the 2004 BBC television drama North and South was shot on Keighley, with Dalton Mills being one of the serial's main locations.

The Keighley and Worth Valley Railway depot was featured in an episode of All Creatures Great and Small which aired in 2023.

== Notable people ==
The following people were born in Keighley, have lived there in the past or are currently resident in the town.

- Simon Beaufoy (1967–), an Oscar, Bafta and Golden Globe award-winning British screenwriter who was born in Keighley
- Steve Binns (1960–), long distance runner who competed in the 1988 Olympic Games.
- Gordon Bottomley (1874–1948), poet.
- Asa Briggs (1921–2016), historian and academic.
- Brontë Sisters, lived in the village of Haworth, which is two miles (3.2 km) south of Keighley.
  - Anne (1820–1849), novelist.
  - Charlotte (1816–1855), novelist.
  - Emily (1818–1848), novelist.
- Harry Brook (1999–), cricketer for Yorkshire and captain of England in ODIs and T20Is
- Alastair Campbell (1957–), former Labour party spin doctor.
- John Tiplady Carrodus (1836–1895), violinist.
- Peter Dixon, British Lions and England rugby union Captain
- Kiki Dee (1947–), singer-songwriter, originally from Bradford.
- Ian Dewhirst, local librarian and historian.
- Sandra Dorne (1924–1992), actress in 1940s and 1950s films, and parts in TV series.
- Roma Gill (1934–2001), academic and literary scholar.
- Jeff Hall (1929–1959), footballer for Birmingham City FC and England. Born in Scunthorpe but raised in Keighley.
- Willis Hall (1929–2005), playwright, lived in Oldfield near Keighley in the 1970s and 1980s.
- Peter Hartley, (1960–), former county cricketer for Yorkshire, Warwickshire and Hampshire.
- Denis Healey (1917–2015), a Labour Chancellor of the Exchequer and Secretary of State for Defence.
- Mike Hellawell (1938–2023), footballer for Birmingham City, Queens Park Rangers, Sunderland and 2 appearances for England FC.
- Trevor Hockey (1943–1987), Welsh international footballer, who also played with Bradford City and Birmingham City.
- Sir Isaac Holden, 1st Baronet (1807–1897), inventor and manufacturer, known for Lucifer Matches, and served as Liberal MP for Keighley 1888–1895.
- Lesley Horton, crime novelist and author of the detective inspector John Handford series lives in Keighley.
- Paul Hudson (1971–), local television weather forecaster.
- Keith Jessop (1933–2010), salvage diver and marine treasure hunter.
- Alexander Keighley (1861–1947), pictorialist photographer & member of the Linked Ring group.
- Henry de Keighley (−1313), Lancashire knight, granted the first charter to hold a market in Keighley on 17 October 1305 by King Edward I.
- Ellie Kildunne (1999-), England women's national rugby union team Rugby Player
- Dougie Lampkin (1976–), born in Silsden, a motorcycle trials rider.
- Tommy Lee (1986–), footballer who is a goalkeeper for Chesterfield.
- Robin Ling (1927–2017), orthopaedic surgeon.
- Leigh Marklew (1968–), of Bradford rock band Terrorvision.
- Peter Mayhew (1944–2019), British actor who played Chewbacca in the Star Wars films, lived in Keighley between 1987 and 2000.
- Chris Melling (1979–), professional pool player and former world number one.
- Sir Tom Moore (1920–2021), former British Military Officer, fundraiser for NHS Charities during the COVID-19 pandemic.
- Herbert Morley (1883–), Victorian explorer.
- Ian Mosey, professional golfer. Winner of two European Tour events.
- Reynold A. Nicholson (1868–1945) was an English orientalist, scholar of Islamic literature, Rumi and Islamic mysticism
- George Nicholson (1760–1825), printer.
- Diana Patrick (1878–1964), novelist
- Matty Pearson (1993–), professional footballer for Huddersfield F.C.
- Eric Pickles (1952–), former Secretary of State for Communities and Local Government and a former Chairman of the Conservative Party.
- Michael Sams (1941–), murderer.
- Geoff Smith (1928–2013), former Bradford City goalkeeper, lived in Keighley.
- Michelle Smith (1983–), rifle shooter who won Silver at the 2010 Commonwealth Games in Delhi, India.
- J. Keighley Snowden (1860–1947), journalist and novelist.
- Philip Snowden, (1864–1937), the first Labour Chancellor of the Exchequer. Editor of the Keighley Labour Journal. MP for Blackburn.
- Mollie Sugden (1922–2009), television comedy actress.
- Sir John Taylor, Baron Ingrow, Lord Ingrow (1917–2002), a soldier and politician. From 1985 to 1992 he was Lord Lieutenant of West Yorkshire.
- Timothy Taylor (1826–1898), local brewer who opened the Timothy Taylor Brewery in 1858.
- Percy Vear (1911–1983), a British professional boxer during the 1920s and 1930s.
- Ricky Wilson (1978–), musician and part of Leeds five-piece Kaiser Chiefs.
- Margaret Wintringham (1879–1955), the second woman to take a seat in the House of Commons.
- Frank Whitcombe (1913–1958), Bradford Northern & Great Britain rugby league footballer.
- Frank Whitcombe Jr (1936–2010), Bradford RFC, Keighley RUFC, Yorkshire RUFC & North Eastern Counties RUFC.
- Martin Whitcombe (1961–), Leicester Tigers, Bedford RFC, Leeds Tykes, Yorkshire RUFC & England 'B' International Rugby Union player.
- Jake Wright (1986–), former professional footballer who played for Oxford United, Halifax Town and Sheffield United.

== Freedom of the Town ==
The following people and military units have received the Freedom of the Town of Keighley.

=== Individuals ===
- Benjamin Septimus Brigg (First Mayor)
- Sir John Brigg
- W A Brigg (Mayor)
- Henry Isaac Butterfield (Textiles Manufacturer and owner of Cliffe Castle)
- Andrew Carnegie
- John Tiplady Carrodus: 5 February 1895.
- John Clough (mill owner and owner of Haincliffe House)
- William Clough
- 8th Duke of Devonshire
- Sir Isaac Holden, 1st Baronet
- H C Longsdon (Mayor in 1901)
- James Lund (Mill Owner 1829–1903 and builder of Lund's Tower)
- Captain Sir Thomas Moore: 16 April 2020.
- Sir Swire Smith: March 1918.
- Sir Bracewell Smith: 6 February 1957.
- Lord Snowdon of Ickornshaw

=== Military Units ===
- The Yorkshire Regiment: 2011.
