= Keighley Tarn =

Upland lake in West Yorkshire, England

- Redcar Tarn
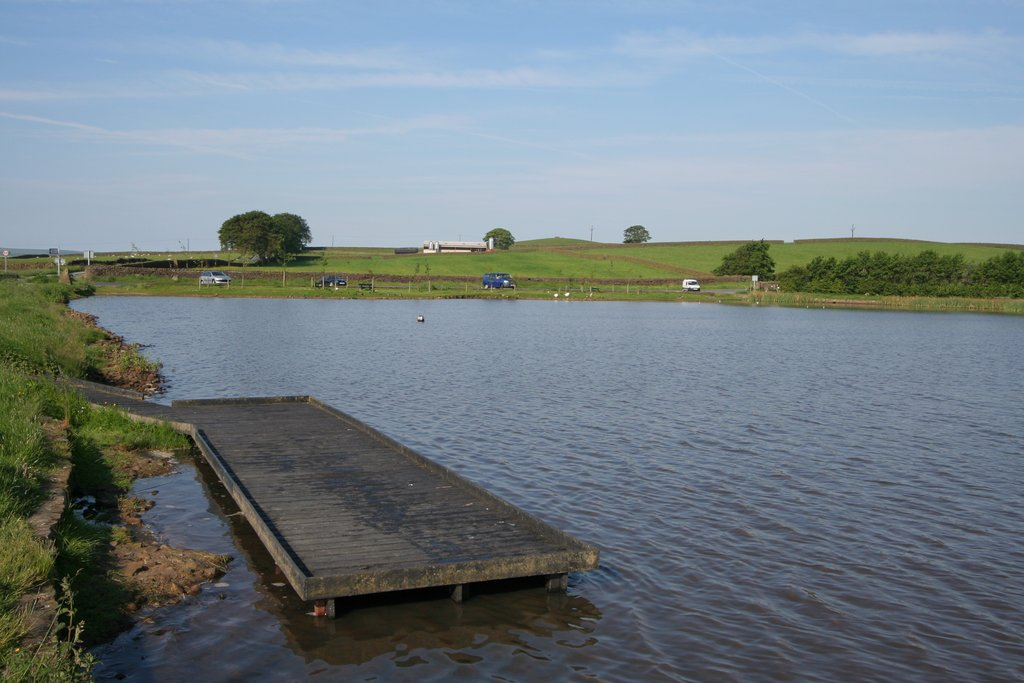
- Jetty, Redcar Tarn
- Interactive map of Keighley Tarn
- Location: Keighley, West Yorkshire
- Coordinates: 53.877°N 1.941°W
- Type: Tarn
- Basin countries: England
- Surface area: 2 hectares (4.9 acres)
- Average depth: 3.6 metres (12 ft)
- Water volume: 73,464 cubic metres (2,594,400 cu ft)
- Surface elevation: 287 metres (942 ft)

Keighley Tarn, also known as Redcar Tarn, is an upland lake 1.2 miles (2 km) north-west of Keighley in West Yorkshire, England. The site is popular with bird-watchers, model boat hobbyists and star-gazers. The tarn also is maintained by Bradford Council as a nature reserve.

== History ==
Keighley Tarn is noted for being one of several small lakes in the Aire Valley, with Malham Tarn being recognised as the biggest, and Eshton tarn the smallest; the tarns at Bog Lane, Skipton and Sea Moor near Silsden have been lost. The surrounding bedrock is in the Millstone Grit series, and consists of a type of siltstone mixed with sandstone that is known locally as Keighley Bluestone, which was much used locally as a road surfacing stone. The tarn lies on Blackhill at an altitude of 287 metres (942 ft) above sea level, and some 1.2 miles (2 km) north-west of Keighley town centre. The tarn covers an area of 2 hectares (4.9 acres) at an average depth of 3.6 metres (12 ft), and has a volume of 73,464 cubic metres (2,594,400 cu ft). The pH value of the water in the tarn has been recorded at 6.9 in 1993.

It is thought that a larger lake existed on the current site of Keighley Tarn during the last glaciation period. Water from this lake overflowed via cutwaters southwards into the valley of the North Beck, a tributary of the River Worth. Until 1865, the tarn was described as being a "swampy marsh", which the local skating club developed into a 2.8-hectare (7-acre) lake and building the clubhouse in 1873. During the 1990s, the tarn was in danger of drying out, but action taken by Bradford Council stopped the tarn from being lost. Bradford Council own and maintain the site as a nature reserve, although Keighley Council have expressed an interest in running the site.

The site is a popular location with the local public; when frozen over, the lake has been used for ice-skating, with a particularly cold-spell providing ice that was inches thick. This became a special event locally with local transport running to the site and car-owners using their headlamps so the skating could continue at night. During the summer it is used to host model-boat events, such as the 1966 Roses Regatta model-boat competition between Lancashire and Yorkshire clubs. The upland locality offers opportunities for observing the night sky.

== Etymology ==
The tarn is often referred to as Redcar Tarn, with Redcar first appearing in documents in 1662. The name derives from the Old Norse words of hrēod and kjarr, meaning reed marsh.

== Wildlife ==
The tarn is noted for its wild birdlife, particularly gulls, canada geese, tufted duck, coot, greylag goose, goldeneye, lapwing, teal, heron, cormorant and caspian gull. The freshwater crustacean gammarus pulex has been observed in the tarn.
