= Worth =

Worth may refer to:

== Places ==
=== United States ===
- Worth, Georgia
- Worth County, Georgia
- Worth, Illinois
  - Worth station in Worth, Illinois
- Worth Township, Cook County, Illinois
- Worth Township, Woodford County, Illinois
- Worth Township, Indiana
- Worth Township, Michigan
- Worth, Missouri
- Worth County, Missouri
- Worth County, Iowa
- Worth, New York
- Worth Township, Butler County, Pennsylvania
- Worth Township, Centre County, Pennsylvania
- Worth Township, Mercer County, Pennsylvania

=== United Kingdom ===
- Worth, Kent, in Dover district
- Worth, West Sussex, a civil parish in West Sussex
- Worth village, West Sussex, a village in Crawley
- Worth Matravers or short Worth in Dorset

=== Germany ===
- Worth, Schleswig-Holstein

== People ==
- Adam Worth (1844–1902), German-born American bank robber and mob boss
- Amy Aldrich Worth (1888–1967), American composer
- Billie Worth (1916–2016), American stage actress
- Bobby Worth (1912–2002), American songwriter
- Brendan Worth (born 1984), Australian rugby league player
- Brian Worth (actor) (1914–1978), British actor
- Charles Frederick Worth (1825–1895), an English-born fashion designer of the 19th century
- George Worth (1915–2006), American fencer
- H M Worth, discoverer of Worth syndrome genetic disorder
- Harry Worth (1917–1989), British comedy actor
- Helen Worth (born 1951), British actress
- Irene Worth (1916–2002), American actress
- Jacob Worth (1838–1905), New York politician
- James Worth, American politician
- Jonathan Worth (1802–1869), American politician
- Marc Worth (1961–2023), British businessman
- Marie Worth (1825–1898), French fashion model
- Martitia Daniel Worth (1806–1874), American political hostess
- Marvin Worth (1925–1998), American film producer
- Michael Worth (born 1965), American actor
- Nicholas Worth (1937–2007), American actor
- Richard Worth (1948–2022), New Zealand politician
- Sandra Worth (born 1954), Canadian author
- Valerie Worth (1933–1994), American poet
- William Worth (1677−1742), Cornish classical scholar
- William J. Worth (1794–1849), American General
- William S. Worth (1840–1904), American General

== Other uses ==
- Net worth
- Bobs Worth, an Irish racehorse
- Worth (horse), an American Thoroughbred racehorse
- Worth (magazine)
- Worth1000, a website
- Worth syndrome, genetic disorder
- Worth, an album released in 1991 by Anything Box
- Worth School, an independent school in Turners Hill, England, United Kingdom
- River Worth in Yorkshire, England, United Kingdom
  - Worth Valley (dale), the valley of the River Worth
  - Worth Valley (ward), a council ward of Bradford, West Yorkshire
- Worth (film), a 2020 biographical film
- "Worth" (The Walking Dead), an episode of the television series The Walking Dead
- "Worth", a song by Senser from Stacked Up (1994)

== See also ==
- Wœrth, a commune in France
- Wörth (disambiguation)
- Fort Worth (disambiguation)
- Value (economics)
