= Worth Valley (dale) =

Valley in West Yorkshire, England

- Worthdale (archaic, unofficial)
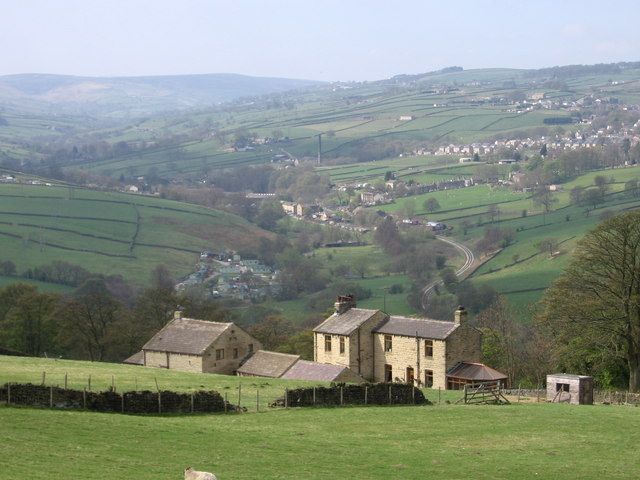
- The view over Worth Valley from Hainworth

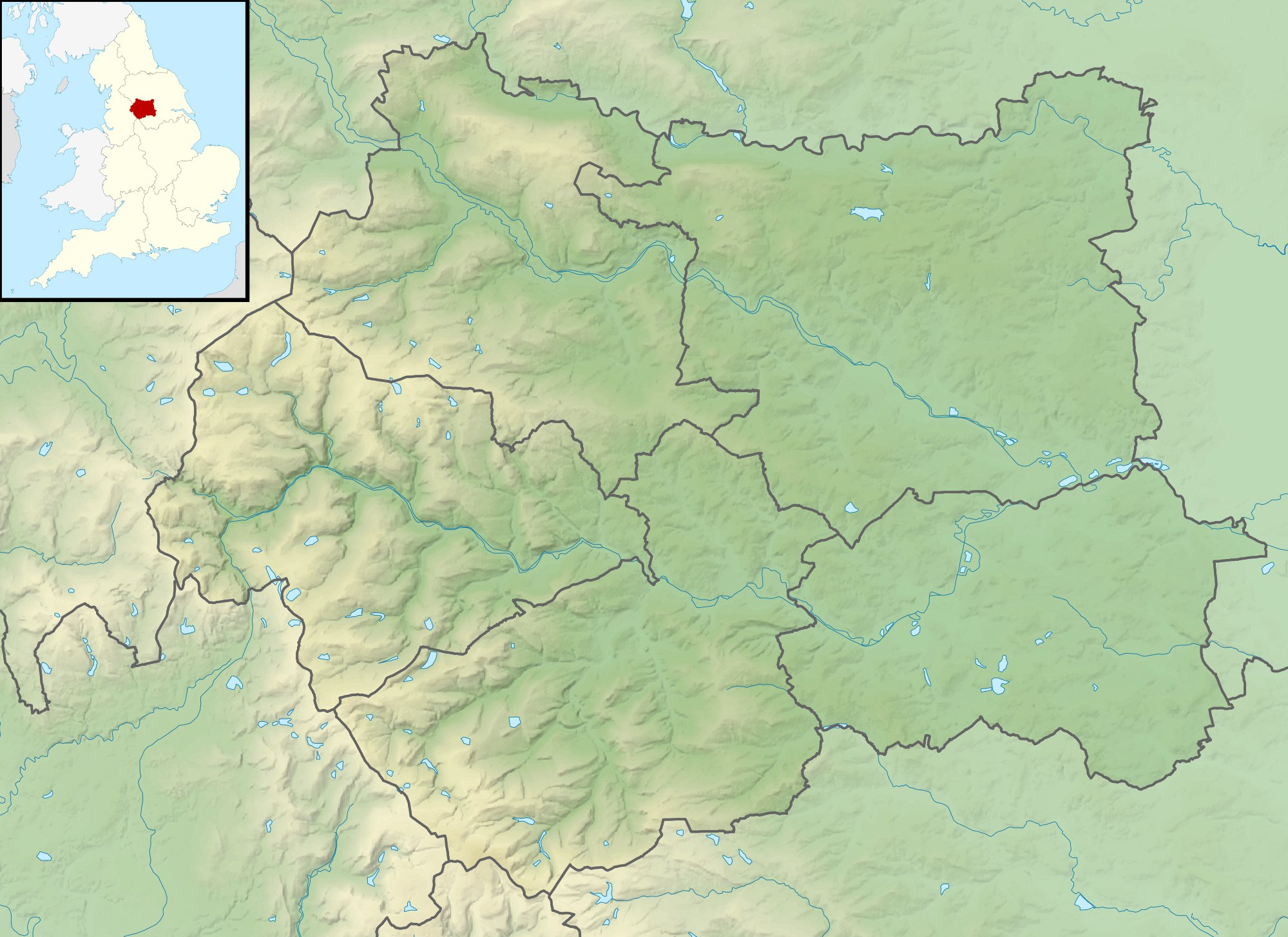
- Location within West Yorkshire
- Length: 10 mi (16 km) West to east

Geography
- Country: England
- State: West Yorkshire
- Region: Yorkshire and the Humber
- Coordinates: 53.831°N 1.956°W
- River: River Worth; Bridgehouse Beck
- Interactive map of Worth Valley

The Worth Valley is a geographic area in West Yorkshire, England, that extends eastwards from Crow Hill and Oxenhope Moor, providing drainage for the River Worth for nearly 10 miles (16 km) to the River Aire. It is a side valley to Airedale, with the River Worth being a major tributary of the River Aire. The Worth Valley was important for its contribution to the textiles industry of the West Riding of Yorkshire and was furnished with several reservoirs to allow mills to operate within the valley. Most of the reservoirs are still in use into the modern day.

The valley has seen a shift in its industry from worsted, wool, and before that mining and quarrying, into a tourist location. The association with the Brontë family, and the Keighley and Worth Valley Railway, has drawn many visitors to the area, particularly from Japan. Connected with these attractions has been the film and TV industry which have recorded shots, programmes, and entire films in the area.

== History ==
In the period when Airedale was subject to glaciation, lakes developed in the valleys which held water behind ice sheets. The emptying and melting of the Airedale Glacier is believed to have carved out Airedale, Bradford Dale and the Worth Valley. The Worth Valley actually had two lakes, one in the Worth Valley itself near to Stanbury (known as Lake Worth, and a second long, narrow lake south of Oxenhope (known as Oxenhope Lake). Some of Oxenhope Lake drained away to the east via Trough Lane and fed into the valley of Harden Beck. Later still, with water draining eastward from what is now Lancashire, and the wash of the water cutting away at the ridges, the two lakes merged into one which had three arms stretching up the Sladen Valley, the Upper Worth Valley and the valley towards Oxenhope that is now drained by Bridgehouse Beck.

The naming of the valley does not follow the convention of other river valleys in West Yorkshire, (Airedale, Bradford Dale, Calderdale etc). However, some buildings in Keighley, at the end of the Worth Valley, were given the name Worthdale. Whilst the Worth Valley extends from Watersheddles Reservoir to the Stockbridge part of Keighley, the area known as the Worth Valley also encompasses North Beck and Bridgehouse Beck, which are due north and due south of the River Worth respectively. In terms of Geomorphology, the Worth Valley is described as being between Oxenhope and Keighley, as well as the Upper Worth valley up to Ponden and Watersheddles Reservoirs.

Since the Middle Ages, sheep farming dominated, especially in the lower parts of the valley floors, and hand-looming became a notable way of earning a second wage.

Population shifts in the area have been tied with local industry and the availability of jobs. The area of the Worth Valley is deemed as being "more rural than suburban...[despite being] situated 10 miles (16 km) from the centre of Bradford". In the last estimated population statistics (2019), it was believed that the ward had 14,220 people living there.

== Governance ==
The Worth Valley is part of the Keighley Constituency for the United Kingdom Parliament, and the Worth Valley itself, is a district under the City of Bradford, which has the largest land area of the wards in Bradford. The area of the Worth valley straddles three parish councils:

- Oakworth and Cackleshaw in the civil parish of Keighley
- Haworth, Cross Roads, and Stanbury in the parish of the same name
- the civil parish of Oxenhope having Leeming, Oxenhope, and the Marsh.

Historically, the township of Haworth was in the wapentake of Agbrigg and Morley. Until 1974, the region was in the West Riding of Yorkshire, and since then it has been in West Yorkshire.

== Hydrology ==
Two reservoirs dam the River Worth; Watersheddles, and Ponden, whilst Lower Laithe dams the Sladen Beck, which flows into the Worth. Around the Oxenhope area are Thornton Moor and Leeming Reservoirs which are major tributaries of Bridgehouse Beck. (Note: Bridgehouse Beck is sometimes referred to as Oxenhope Beck.) One further reservoir to the west of Oxenhope, Leeshaw, has an overflow into Moorhouse Beck, which joins Bridgehouse Beck at Oxenhope railway station.

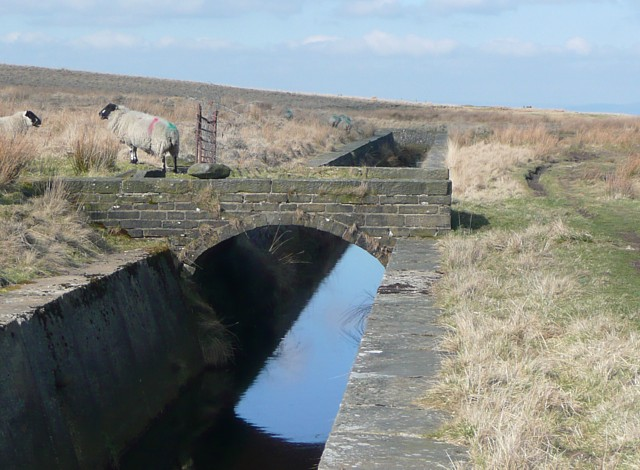
Bridge over water conduit, Oxenhope

Reservoirs in the Worth Valley
Name	Coordinates	Type	Volume	Discharge	Notes
Keighley Moor	53.851°N 2.020°W	Drinking water	11,020,000 cubic feet (312,100 m^{3})	North Beck	
Leeming	53.804°N 1.941°W	Compensation	14,397,300 cubic feet (407,687 m^{3})	Bridgehouse Beck	
Leeshaw	53.813°N 1.979°W	Compensation	18,335,900 cubic feet (519,215 m^{3})	Moorhouse Beck	
Lower Laithe	53.828°N 1.981°W	Compensation	40,165,600 cubic feet (1,137,364 m^{3})	Sladen Beck	
Ponden	53.830°N 2.010°W	Compensation	30,542,200 cubic feet (864,858 m^{3})	River Worth	
Stubden End (Note: Stubden End is out of the Worth Valley near to the village of Denholme, but a conduit and aqueduct carries water from the Worth Valley into the reservoir. Water is then sent via a pipeline to Chellow Heights Water Treatment Works.)	53.795°N 1.907°W	Drinking water	16,535,500 cubic feet (468,232 m^{3})	Harden Beck	
Thornton Moor	53.793°N 1.921°W	Drinking water	26,432,900 cubic feet (748,497 m^{3})	Leeming Water	
Watersheddles (Note: Watersheddles is in Lancashire, but drains eastwards into the Worth Valley)	53.838°N 2.051°W	Drinking water (Note: Was historically used as a compensation reservoir, feeding water into the mills downstream on a twice daily basis.)	28,295,300 cubic feet (801,235 m^{3})	River Worth	

A smaller reservoir was built at Sugden End above Cross Roads, but this is now disused, with a view to turning it into a community asset. Conduits were built by the Bradford Corporation to supply water to their reservoirs at Thornton Moor and Stubden. The mill owners in the Worth Valley still needed water, so the compensation reservoirs at Leeming and Leeshaw were built. Prior to the diverting of the water into conduits and reservoirs, the River Worth and its associated streams were subjected to a far heavier flow than after the damming of the waters. Many other reservoirs, conduits and aqueducts were planned and listed, but some did not come to fruition – for example, the Sladen valley was to have two reservoirs but only Lower Laithe was built. The upper reservoir near to a point known as Bully Trees, was abandoned due to the geological instability of the area.

The River Worth runs for 9.4 miles (15 km) from Watersheddles to the River Aire at Aireworth, a suburb of Keighley.

Haworth and Oxenhope are considered to be in the Worth Valley, although strictly speaking, there are in the vale cut by Bridgehouse Beck (sometimes referred to as Oxenhope Beck). The beck enters the River Worth at Mytholmes.

== Geology ==
The underlying geology of the area is the Namurian millstone grit series which extends into Airedale. Coal reserves were found in thin beds in the Worth valley, but the arrival of the railways in the area meant that cheaper and better quality coal could be railed in from the Yorkshire coalfields. The millstone grit was heavily worked in the area, with quarries at Dimples, West End, Harehill Edge, Naylor Hill, Dry Clough, Black Moor (Oxenhope), (Note: There was a second quarry named Black Moor near to Cullingworth. The quarry named Black Moor at Oxenhope supplied Rough Flags for buildings within the town.) Sugden, Braithwaite, Cuckoo Park Farm, Branshaw Quarry, and Penistone Hill.

Keighley Bluestone, "a hard, siliceous, bluish grey siltstone with marine fauna," was quarried at Blue Delph on Harehill Edge. This stone had a blueish-grey colour when first exposed and was very resistant to wear and so was used to dress roads in the turnpike era. Most of the sandstone quarried in the area was used for building, especially the woollen and worsted mills in the Worth Valley and beyond. Naylor Hill (to the east of Haworth) which works the Midgely Grit [sic] used for building, is still operating, as is Branshaw Quarry which works the Woodhouse Grit for flags and stones. Stone from Branshaw Quarry was used in the A629 bypass between Kildwick and Keighley in 1988.

The moorland at the western end of the valleys is overlaid with peat deposits. These areas are the major water catchments, and the peat can lead to discolouration of the water. The water catchment areas on the moors are part of the South Pennine Moors SSSI. At Crow Hill, on the western extremity of the Worth Valley, a bog burst in 1824, which saw the Brontë children having to take shelter in Ponden Hall.

== Industry ==
The combination of the availability of water, and the proximity to the Lancashire worsted, wool and cotton industries, helped the Worth valley thrive as an industrial region in the late 18th/early 19th centuries. Many of the reservoirs in the upper valleys were built as compensation reservoirs to keep a constant flow of water available in the River Worth, feeding the mills downstream. By the 1850s, with the advent of water-powered mills, most of the textile industry mills in the valley were mechanised, whereas previously, they had been small scale workings powered by humans. The loss of employment in the textile industry in the area during the 20th century, has been offset somewhat by the number of jobs created in the tourist industry with the advent of the preserved railway line and the literary connections. Most villages had at least one mill, with larger settlements having several; Haworth had Bridgehouse, Ebor and Ivy Bank Mills, Oakworth had Oakworth and Vale Mills, Oxenhope had Dunkirk and Lowertown Mills, and Stanbury had Griffe, Lumbfoot and Ponden Mills. A comprehensive list can be found on the Mills of Yorkshire article.

== Transport ==
The main road through the valley, the A6033, leaves the A629 road at Cross Roads and heads south on the east side of the valley running through Oxenhope, before heading over Oxenhope Moor to Hebden Bridge in Calderdale. Both of these roads were turnpikes; Keighley to Halifax and Lees to Hebden Bridge. The Lees to Hebden Bridge Turnpike, now the A6033 road, was authorised in 1813 and built between 1814 and 1815. The A6033 is one of the most dangerous roads in the United Kingdom, and was closed for 20 weeks in 2020 to allow for various schemes to improve bends and resurfacing work.

The first turnpike through the valley was The Bluebell Turnpike (Bradford to Colne), which cut across the valley in an east/west direction from Cross Roads through Haworth, then Stanbury and over the moors to Wycoller. All parts of this road still exist, including Main Street in Haworth, but none are A roads.

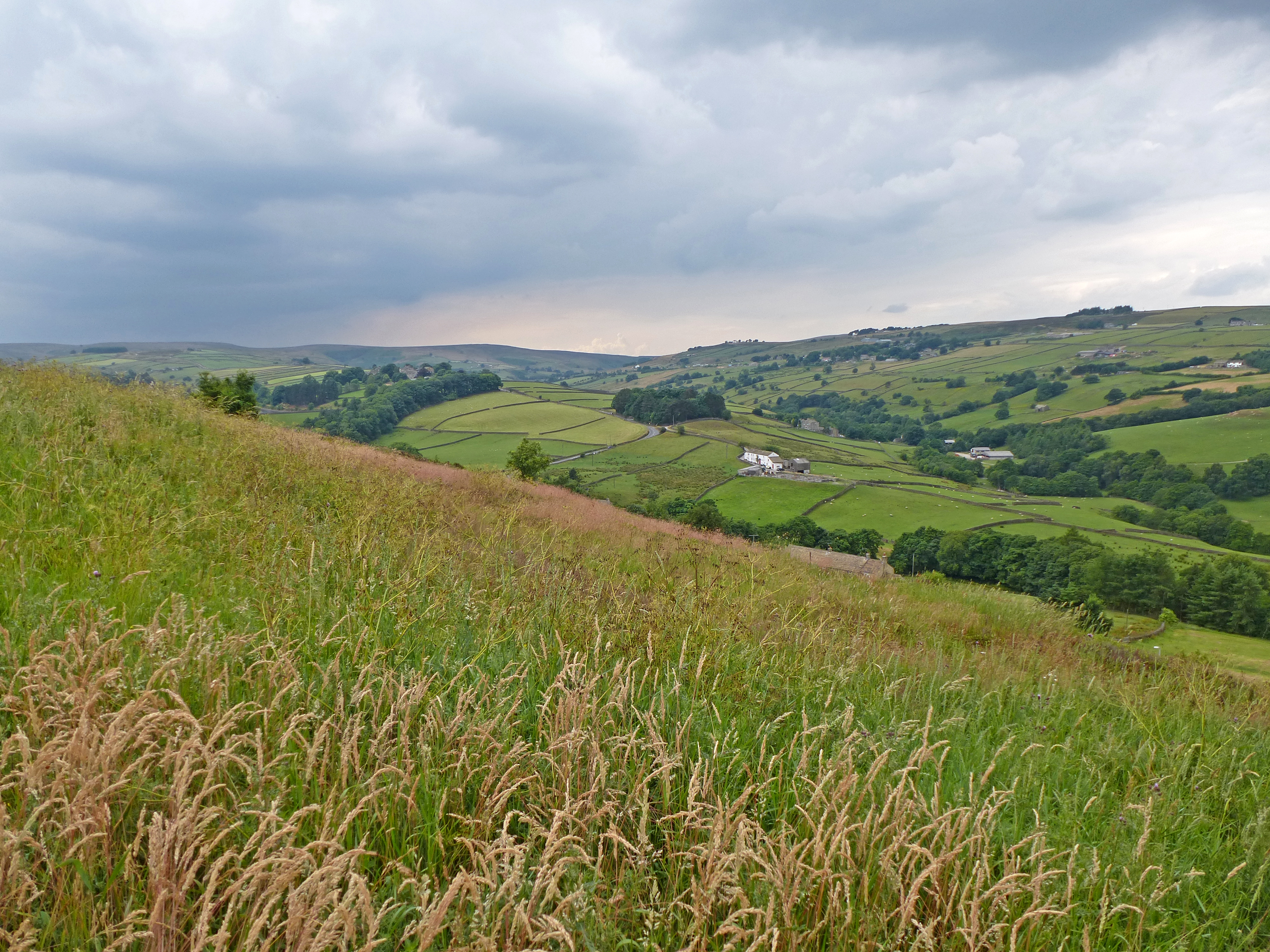
The upper Worth Valley

The first railway proposed through the valley was the Manchester, Hebden Bridge and Keighley & Leeds & Carlisle Junction Railway, which would have been in a tunnel between Hebden Bridge and Haworth and a separate branch into Keighley from Oakworth. This was proposed in 1846 and never taken up, but the line which eventually became the Keighley and Worth Valley Railway, was built in the 1860s after local businessmen petitioned the Midland Railway headquarters in Derby. As the line is now a heritage railway, the nearest public railway station is at Keighley, and the nearest airport to Haworth (Leeds Bradford Airport) is 18 miles (29 km) away to the east.

A second railway was built by the Great Northern Railway which left Keighley along the same line as the Worth Valley but followed the contours of the valley on the south side to breach the hill via a curved tunnel (Lees Moor) and go into Cullingworth.

Several footpaths cross the Worth Valley;

- The Yorkshire Water Way – a 104-mile (167 km) walk connecting several reservoirs maintained by Yorkshire Water. The path goes east to west through Haworth.
- The Brontë Way – a 40-mile (64 km) walk linking properties connected to the Brontë family.
- Pennine Bridleway – Calder Aire Link – a connection from the St Ives estate in Bingley, with the Pennine Way at Widdop Reservoir, extending for 17 miles (27 km).
- The Worth Way – an 11-mile (18 km) circular walk starting and finishing in Keighley.
- The Railway Children Walk – a 6-mile (9.7 km) walk centred around Haworth, Oakworth and Oxenhope, incorporating outside scenes shot for the film The Railway Children.

== Culture ==
The Worth Valley is synonymous with the Brontë family. Many of the structures and scenery in the valley appear in novels written by either Anne, Charlotte or Emily either as what they are, or as fictitious locations. The parsonage at Haworth, remains a busy tourist destination, including those from abroad. Japan has a "well-populated Brontë Society", so much so, that many of the wooden waymarker signs on Haworth Moor are written in Japanese as well as English.

The Worth Valley has the Keighley and Worth Valley heritage railway running through it from Keighley to Oxenhope and has been used in several films, including The Railway Children, its sequel, The Railway Children Return, Yanks, the film of the Pink Floyd musical The Wall, and an episode of the long-running situation comedy, The Last of the Summer Wine.

Various annual events take place in the valley; the Oxenhope Straw Race, the Haworth 1940s and 1960s weekends. The Tour de Yorkshire (and its precursor, the Tour de France in 2014) has visited the valley on each iteration of the event, with land art usually being a focus of the celebrations.

== Settlements ==
- Cackleshaw
- Cross Roads
- Damems
- Haworth
- Ingrow
- Keighley
- Laycock
- Leeming
- Lees
- Lumbfoot
- Mytholmes
- Oakworth
- Oldfield
- Oxenhope
- Stanbury
