= Newsholme, West Yorkshire =

Hamlet in West Yorkshire, England

Coordinates: 53.854°N 1.970°W

Newsholme
- Hamlet
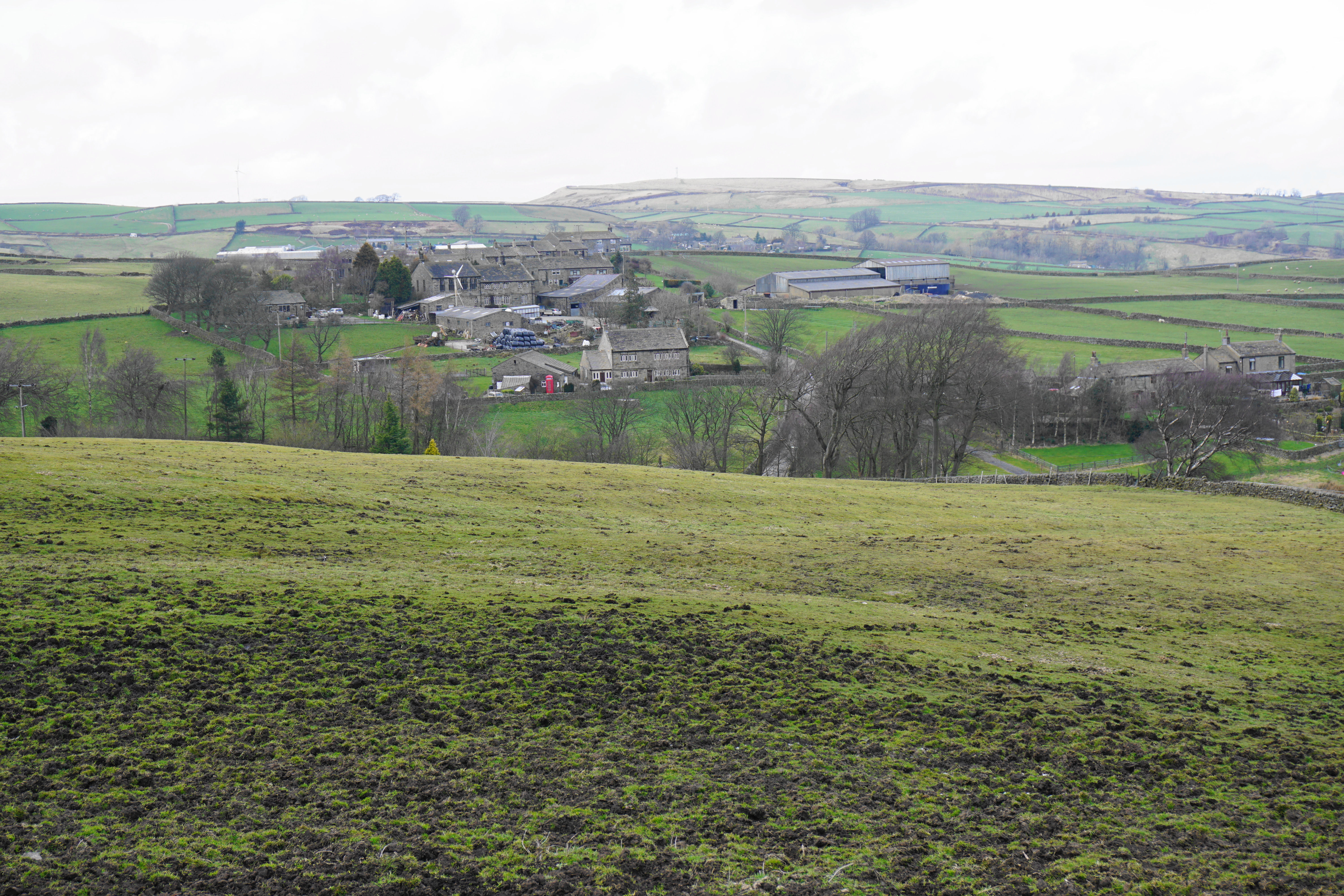
- Newsholme from the south

- Location within West Yorkshire
- OS grid reference: SE020398
- Civil parish: Keighley
- Metropolitan borough: City of Bradford
- Metropolitan county: West Yorkshire
- Region: Yorkshire and the Humber
- Country: England
- Sovereign state: United Kingdom
- Post town: KEIGHLEY
- Postcode district: BD22
- Police: West Yorkshire
- Fire: West Yorkshire
- Ambulance: Yorkshire
- UK Parliament: Keighley and Ilkley

Newsholme is a hamlet in the civil parish of Keighley, in the Bradford district in the county of West Yorkshire, England. The hamlet is on a ridge of moorland between the North Beck and River Worth valleys. Though predominantly a farming settlement, the hamlet did have two working mills in the 19th century. The Church of St John was created in the village in 1844 from an existing farmhouse (which had been built in 1670), and this has led to some people labelling the settlement as a village. The church still holds regular services and is in the Ecclesiastical Parish of Oakworth, previously being in the large Ecclesiastical Parish of Keighley.

== History ==
Newsholme is mentioned in the Domesday Book as Neuhuse and belonging to William of Utley in 1066, then King William in 1086, but King William granted the manor of Newsholme to Gilbert de Tison. The name means at the New Houses, huse being a plural of the Old English word hũs meaning house. The name has been recorded variously as Neusum in 1254, Neusom (1259), Newson (1504), Newsome (1577) and Newsham (1608). The writer William Keighley states that at Domesday it had one carucate of land which could be taxed, and the name Newhouse referred to just one house; when other houses were added it was called Newhouseham, which was amended over the years to Newsholme. Historically, the hamlet was in the wapentake of East Staincliffe, and considered to be part of the Craven District in ancient times. Newsholme, Thwaites and Keighley were enclosed after an Act of Parliament (Kighley [sic], Thwaites, and Newsholme (Yorkshire) Inclosures Act 1780 (20 Geo. 3. c. 12 Pr.)). The hamlet occupies a position on a ridge of moorland between the Worth Valley (to the south) and the valley of North Beck (to the north), (Note: The Keighley Parish registers describe Newsholme as being on the North Beck, when it is on high ground just north of Newsholme Beck.) some 2 miles (3.2 km) west of Oakworth and 3 miles (4.8 km) south west of Keighley. According to the Ordnance Survey, the highest point in the hamlet is 846 feet (258 m).

In 1844, part of a farmhouse in the hamlet was converted into a chapel-of-ease to the main parish church in Keighley, with the mother church providing clergy every Sunday rather than having an incumbent. The main farmhouse building itself dates from 1670 and the whole structure, including the church, is grade II listed. It is recorded that the inhabitants of Newsholme could not afford a church or chapel, so they set about converting one of the farmhouses rather than a new-build, and even though it has a church/chapel, the settlement is still regarded as a hamlet. The chapel occupies the west half of the upper floor of the old farmhouse and is square with two timber arcades within. It is dedicated to St John and is now part of the Ecclesiastical parish of Oakworth. Even though the church is 4 miles (6.4 km) west of the main parish church in Keighley, due to the size of Keighley Ecclesiastical parish, it was actually at the centrepoint of the parish area. In 1858, it was recorded that the Sunday School room could take 100 children, and the average weekly congregation numbered around 60. Two other buildings are grade II listed in the hamlet, both of which are private dwellings.

The hamlet is part of the civil parish of Keighley, the ward of Worth Valley, and is represented at Westminster as part of the Keighley and Ilkley Constituency. Although in West Yorkshire, the hamlet is close to the border with North Yorkshire (Note: The boundaries changed in 1974. Despite its now proximity to the border with North Yorkshire, a great portion of the land northwards of Keighley towards the River Ure was formerly in the West Riding of Yorkshire.) and as a small farming community which is typical of a "Dales village", it is probably the last surviving type of settlement of its kind in the Bradford District. Besides farming, the hamlet also took part in the cotton industry prevalent in the area, and had two mills at the southern end of the hamlet; High Mill (SE018396) and Low Mill (SE020396). Both mills were built for processing cotton, although the Low Mill later worked corn and also produced bobbins. The waterwheel attached to Low Mill was still extant when it was sold for conversion to a private dwelling in 1989. Both mills made use of Newsholme Beck, which circles the hamlet to the south and is a tributary of North Beck.

The White Hill area of Newsholme is a Site of Local Nature Conservation Importance, and is listed due to its grassland.

== Newsholme Dean ==
To the north of the hamlet lies Newsholme Dean, a wooded valley carrying Dean Beck which becomes North Beck further downstream and enters the River Worth in Keighley. Water comes down the valley from Keighley Moor Reservoir. The valley has three listed structures; a packhorse bridge, a clapper bridge, and a telephone kiosk that acted as a housing for water flow measuring equipment. It was thought that the structure was purpose-built for the flow gauge, however it was later determined that the structure was an original 1920s designed telephone kiosk, the first incarnation of national telephone kiosk design. In the early 20th century, Newsholme Dean was described as the "Shipley Glen for Keighley holiday-makers."
