= Keighley Moor Reservoir =

Reservoir in Yorkshire

- The Big Dam
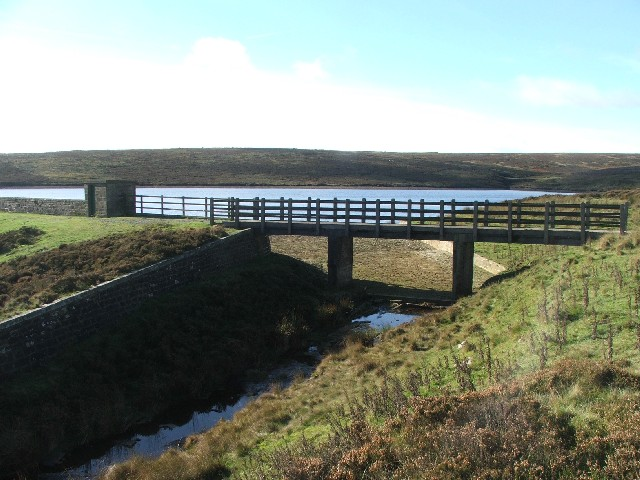
- Keighley Moor Reservoir
- Interactive map of Keighley Moor Reservoir
- Location: Keighley Moor, West Yorkshire
- Coordinates: 53.851°N 2.020°W
- Type: Reservoir
- Primary outflows: Morkin Beck
- Catchment area: 136 hectares (340 acres)
- Built: 1830s
- First flooded: 1840
- Surface area: 5.74 hectares (14.2 acres)
- Average depth: 5.4 metres (18 ft)
- Water volume: 312,089 cubic metres (11,021,300 cu ft)
- Surface elevation: 372 metres (1,220 ft)

Keighley Moor Reservoir (known locally as the Big Dam) is a freshwater reservoir west of Oakworth, in West Yorkshire, England. Although it was originally built to keep a constant supply of water to downstream mills, it is now used for freshwater supply within the Keighley and Bradford areas, with water overflowing the reservoir running via North Beck into the River Worth in Keighley. The reservoir is now owned and operated by Yorkshire Water.

== History ==
The reservoir is built upon sandstone of the Millstone Grit Carboniferous Period, and is some 3.5 kilometres (2.2 mi) west of Oakworth at SD987394. The reservoir covers an area of 5.74 hectares (14.2 acres) with an average depth of 5.4 metres (18 ft) at an altitude of 372 metres (1,220 ft) above sea level. It has a catchment area of 136 hectares (340 acres) and holds a water volume of 312,089 cubic metres (11,021,300 cu ft), although a sediment survey carried out in 1990 estimated that it could hold over 346,000 cubic metres (12,200,000 cu ft). Yorkshire Water, who own and operate the reservoir, are allowed to abstract a maximum of 6,951,230 cubic metres (245,480,000 cu ft) per year until 2027, when the maximum abstraction level will be dropped to 818,280 cubic metres (28,897,000 cu ft) per year.

Keighley Moor Reservoir (known locally at the time of its building as the Big Dam), was originally built in the 1830s to a design by W. Hopkinson and contractors Bailey & Brothers, to ensure a good flow of water to power mills further downstream. The becks downstream of the reservoir had 14 mills along their length, and in 1832, after a series of droughts, the mill owners got together to build a reservoir so that the water supply through North beck was always plentiful. The dam was completed in 1840, and funding for the dam came from the mill owners who paid according to how many mills they owned and the amount of water needed to power their waterwheels. It was enlarged in 1846 when it was found that the flow rate was insufficient. Initially, the mill owners rented the reservoir, then leased it from the Duke of Devonshire's estate.

Prior to Yorkshire Water assuming control in 1974, the reservoir was owned by the Craven Water Board, who themselves had taken over the licence from the Duke of Devonshire (a local landowner) in 1939 for a payment of £1. The catchment area consists of peat, and is used both recreationally and for grazing sheep and raising grouse. Several streams flow into the reservoir from the higher ground to the east, but only two, Crumber Hill Dyke, and Fairy Fold Dyke are named on mapping.

Water overflowing from the reservoir travels 9.5 kilometres (5.9 mi) via Morkin Beck, which later becomes North Beck, eastwards into the River Worth at Keighley. The dam wall of the reservoir, which is at the eastern end, also doubles up as a walkway and carries the Millennium Way footpath. The reservoir is now owned by Yorkshire Water, and it supplies fresh drinking water to the local area.

== Hydrometry ==
Like nearby Watersheddles Reservoir, the sandstone of the area is overlain by peat, which discolours the water flowing into the reservoir. Testing in 1988 revealed a ph range of 4.0–6.1, which was higher than Watersheddles which was measured at the same time and found to be 2.8–4.5. The water quality in the reservoir was designated as a fail by the Environment Agency in 2019, due in part to the presence of polybrominated diphenyl ethers (PBDE).
