= Worth Valley =

Worth Valley may refer to:

- Worth Valley (dale)
- Worth Valley (ward)
