= List of mills in Bradford (metropolitan borough) =

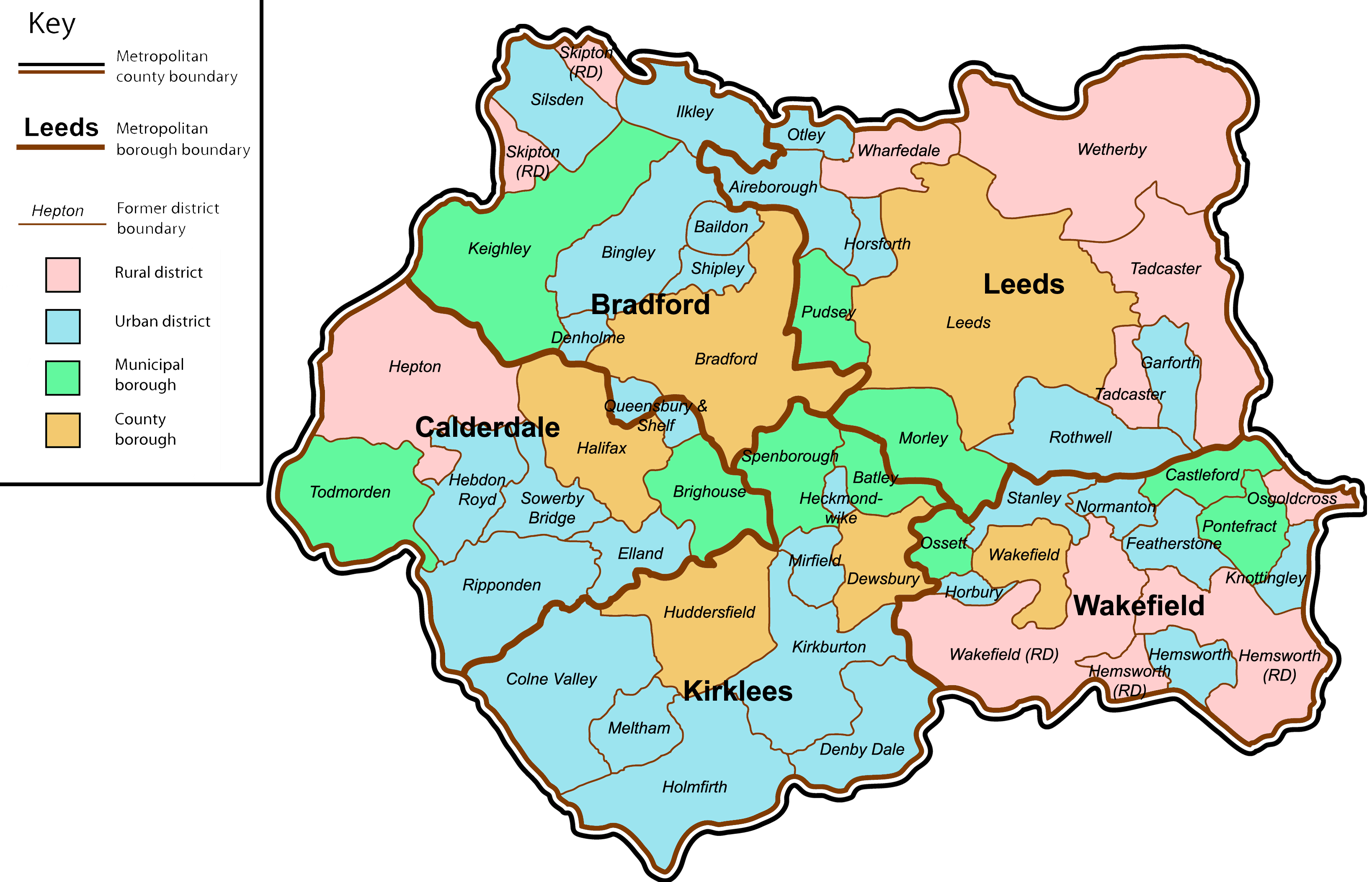
The City of Bradford in West Yorkshire, England

This is a list of the wool, cotton and other textile mills in the City of Bradford, a metropolitan borough in West Yorkshire, England. This includes Bradford and Keighley with Baildon, Bingley, Denholme, Ilkley, Queensbury and Shelf, Silsden and Shipley.

The list also includes mills in Skipton, historically also in the West Riding of Yorkshire but now in North Yorkshire.

== Baildon ==
Name	Architect	Location	Built	Demolished	Served (Years)
Baildon Mills		Baildon, SE 1545 3980 53°51′15″N 1°46′00″W			
	Notes: National Building Register:62458]: (B)				
Charlestown Mill		Baildon, SE 162 386 53°50′36″N 1°45′19″W			
	Notes: National Building Register:62512: )(C)				
Dyeworks		Baildon, SE 1589 3860 53°50′36″N 1°45′36″W			
	Notes: National Building Register:62461: (B)				
Lower Holme Mills		Baildon, SE 1530 3810 53°50′20″N 1°46′08″W			
	Notes: National Building Register:62462: (B)				
Mill		Baildon, SE 1544 3966 53°51′11″N 1°46′00″W			
	Notes: National Building Register:62676: (B)				
Prospect Works		Baildon, SE 1555 3980 53°51′15″N 1°45′54″W			
	Notes: National Building Register:62459: (B)				
Sandals Mill		Baildon, SE 1521 3914 53°50′54″N 1°46′13″W			
	Notes: National Building Register:62460: (B)				

== Bingley ==
Name	Architect	Location	Built	Demolished	Served (Years)
Airedale Mills		Bingley, SE 1035 4077 53°51′47″N 1°50′39″W			
	Notes: National Building Register:62304: (B)				
Angora Mill		Bingley, SE 1130 3890 53°50′46″N 1°49′47″W			
	Notes: National Building Register:62403: (B)				
Argyll Mill		Bingley, SE 1105 3928 53°50′59″N 1°50′01″W			
	Notes: National Building Register:62632: (B)				
Beckfoot Mill		Bingley, SE 1031 3849 53°50′33″N 1°50′41″W			
	Notes: National Building Register:62394: (B)				
Bingley Mills		Bingley, SE 1085 3955 53°51′07″N 1°50′12″W			
	Notes: National Building Register:62389: (B)				
Bowling Green Mills		Bingley, SE 1077 3945 53°51′04″N 1°50′16″W	1871		155
	Notes: National Building Register:62390: Engine House and Chimney are Grade II listed buildings (B)				
Britannia Mills		Bingley, SE 1125 3912 53°50′53″N 1°49′50″W			
	Notes: National Building Register:62399: (B)				
Britannia Works		Bingley,			
	Notes: (see Britannia Mills)				
Castlefields Mill		Bingley, SE 0992 40304 53°51′32″N 1°51′02″W			
	Notes: National Building Register:62301: (B)				
Cottingley Mill		Bingley, SE 1180 3744 53°49′59″N 1°49′20″W			
	Notes: National Building Register:62404: (B)				
Cross Roads Mill		Bingley, SE 0480 3800 53°50′18″N 1°55′43″W			
	Notes: National Building Register:62678: (B)				
Crossflatts Mill		Bingley, SE 1035 4060 53°51′41″N 1°50′39″W			
	Notes: National Building Register:62306: (B)				
Cullingworth Mills		Bingley, SE 0685 3670 53°49′35″N 1°53′51″W			
	Notes: National Building Register:43595: (B)				
Dubb Mill		Bingley, SE 1115 3912 53°50′53″N 1°49′55″W			
	Notes: National Building Register:62400: (B)				
Ebor Mill		Bingley, SE 1120 3910 53°50′53″N 1°49′52″W			
	Notes: National Building Register:62401: (B)				
Eldwick Beck Mill		Bingley, SE 1260 4050 53°51′38″N 1°48′36″W			
	Notes: National Building Register:62307: (C)				
Eldwick Moulding Mill		Bingley, SE 1210 4015 53°51′27″N 1°49′03″W			
	Notes: National Building Register:62308: (B)				
Ellar Carr Mill		Bingley, SE 0656 3699 53°49′45″N 1°54′07″W			
	Notes: National Building Register:62373]: (A)				
Harden Mill		Bingley, SE 0851 3835 53°50′29″N 1°52′20″W			
	Notes: National Building Register:62376: (B)				
Holroyd Mill		Bingley, SE 1010 4160 53°52′14″N 1°50′52″W			
	Notes: National Building Register:62303: (B)				
Lees Mill		Bingley, SE 0385 3759 53°50′04″N 1°56′35″W			
	Notes: National Building Register:62650: (A)				
Lily Croft Mills		Bingley, SE 1099 3909 53°50′53″N 1°50′04″W			
	Notes: National Building Register:62393: (B)				
Limefield Mill		Bingley, SE 1040 4065 53°51′43″N 1°50′36″W			
	Notes: National Building Register:62305: (B)				
Monarch Mills		Bingley, SE 1110 3920 53°50′56″N 1°49′58″W			
	Notes: National Building Register:62398: (B)				
Park Road Mills		Bingley, SE 1096 3930 53°50′59″N 1°50′06″W			
	Notes: National Building Register:62391: (B)				
Stanley Mill		Bingley, SE 1090 3925 53°50′58″N 1°50′09″W			
	Notes: National Building Register:62392: (B)				
Tannery		Bingley, SE 0659 3621 53°49′20″N 1°54′05″W			
	Notes: National Building Register:62605: (B)				
Vale Mill		Bingley, SE 0380 3822 53°50′25″N 1°56′37″W			
	Notes: National Building Register:62645: (B)				
Victoria Mills		Bingley, SE 1125 3899 53°50′49″N 1°49′50″W			
	Notes: National Building Register:62402: (B)				
Woodfield Mill		Bingley, SE 0714 3711 53°49′49″N 1°53′35″W			
	Notes: National Building Register:62606: (B)				

== Burley-In-Wharfedale (Ilkley) ==
Name	Architect	Location	Built	Demolished	Served (Years)
Greenholme Mills		Burley-In-Wharfedale (Ilkley), SE 1685 4680 53°55′01″N 1°44′42″W			
	Notes: National Building Register:62310: (B)				
Rombalds Moor Bleachworks		Burley-In-Wharfedale (Ilkley), SE 1594 4450 53°53′47″N 1°45′32″W			
	Notes: National Building Register:62309: (C)				

== Haworth (Bingley; Keighley) ==
Name	Architect	Location	Built	Demolished	Served (Years)
Ashmount Mills, Keighley		Haworth, SE 0305 3746 53°50′00″N 1°57′19″W			
	Notes: National Building Register:62648: (B)				
Bridge Mill/Lowertown Mill, Keighley		Haworth, SE 0343 3475 53°48′32″N 1°56′58″W			
	Notes: National Building Register:62657: (B)				
Bridge-house Mills, Keighley		Haworth, SE 0350 3685 53°49′40″N 1°56′54″W			
	Notes: National Building Register:62651: (B)				
Brooks Meeting Mill, Keighley		Haworth, SE 0250 3508 53°48′43″N 1°57′49″W			
	Notes: National Building Register:62641: (B)				
Charles Mill, Keighley		Haworth, SE 0348 3468 53°48′30″N 1°56′55″W			
	Notes: National Building Register:62659: (A)				
Dunkirk Mill, Keighley		Haworth, SE 0200 3519 53°48′47″N 1°58′16″W			
	Notes: National Building Register:62638: (A)				
Ebor Mill, Keighley		Haworth, SE 0366 3765 53°50′06″N 1°56′45″W			
	Notes: Ebor Mill, Haworth Was an integrated worsted factory. Founded c1819. The large block is 1887. Originally water powered, later steam. Has an unusually fine chimney. National Building Register:62649: (A)				
Fisher’s Lodge Mill, Keighley		Haworth, SE 0282 3528 53°48′50″N 1°57′31″W			
	Notes: National Building Register:62668: (B)				
Forks House Mill, Keighley		Haworth, SD 9936 3574 53°49′05″N 2°00′40″W			
	Notes: National Building Register:62160: (C)				
Criffe Mill, Keighley		Haworth, SE 0065 3737 53°49′57″N 1°59′30″W			
	Notes: National Building Register:62635: (A)				
Hollins Mill, Keighley		Haworth, SE 0208 3742 53°49′59″N 1°58′12″W			
	Notes: National Building Register:62640: (B)				
Holme Mill, Keighley		Haworth, SE 0342 3491 53°48′38″N 1°56′58″W			
	Notes: National Building Register:62655: (B)				
Ivy Bank Mill, Keighley		Haworth, SE 0341 3676 53°49′37″N 1°56′59″W			
	Notes: National Building Register:62652: (B)				
Lees Mill, Bingley		Haworth, SE 0385 3759 53°50′04″N 1°56′35″W			
	Notes: National Building Register:62650: (A)				
Lower Town Mill, Keighley		Haworth,			
	Notes: (see Holme Mill)				
Lowertown Shed and Mill, Keighley		Haworth, SE 0340 3485 53°48′36″N 1°56′59″W			
	Notes: National Building Register:62656: (A)				
Lumb Foot Mill, Keighley		Haworth, SE 0149 3759 53°50′04″N 1°58′44″W			
	Notes: National Building Register:62637: (B)				
Mill, Keighley		Haworth, SE 0298 3741 53°49′59″N 1°57′22″W			
	Notes: National Building Register:62647: (B)				
Mytholmes Mill, Keighley		Haworth, SE 0335 3795 53°50′16″N 1°57′02″W			
	Notes: National Building Register:62671: (B)				
New Mill, Keighley		Haworth, SE 007 367 53°49′36″N 1°59′27″W			
	Notes: National Building Register:62681: ) 6				
Oxenhope Mill, Keighley		Haworth, SE 0332 3541 53°48′54″N 1°57′04″W			
	Notes: National Building Register:62654: (B)				
Perseverance Mill, Keighley		Haworth, SE 0350 3472 53°48′31″N 1°56′54″W			
	Notes: National Building Register:62658: (B)				
Royd House Mill, Keighley		Haworth, SE 0390 3581 53°49′07″N 1°56′32″W			
	Notes: National Building Register:62653: (B)				
Spring Row Mill, Keighley		Haworth, SE 0412 3438 53°48′20″N 1°56′20″W			
	Notes: National Building Register:62666: (B)				
Sykes Mill, Keighley		Haworth, SE 0405 3435 53°48′19″N 1°56′24″W			
	Notes: National Building Register:62661: (A)				
Wadsworth Mill, Keighley		Haworth, SE 0342 3450 53°48′24″N 1°56′58″W			
	Notes: National Building Register:62660: (B)				

== Keighley ==
Name	Architect	Location	Built	Demolished	Served (Years)
Aireworth Mills		Keighley, SE 0725 4195 53°52′25″N 1°53′28″W			
	Notes: National Building Register:62297 : (A)				
Alexandra Mill		Keighley, SE 0642 4115 53°51′59″N 1°54′14″W			
	Notes: National Building Register:62357 : (B)				
Alexandra Shed		Keighley,			
	Notes: (see Alexandra Mill)				
Becks Mill		Keighley, SE 0555 4100 53°51′55″N 1°55′02″W			
	Notes: National Building Register:62342 : (A)				
Beech Mill		Keighley, SE 0585 4015 53°51′27″N 1°54′45″W			
	Notes: National Building Register:62352 : (B)				
Botany Buildings		Keighley, SE 0699 4149 53°52′10″N 1°53′43″W			
	Notes: National Building Register:62295: (B)				
Burlington Mills		Keighley, SE 0678 4134 53°52′06″N 1°53′54″W			
	Notes: National Building Register:62296 : (B)				
Cabbage Mill		Keighley, SE 0650 4079 53°51′48″N 1°54′10″W			
	Notes: National Building Register:62363 : (B)				
Calversyke Mill		Keighley, SE 0525 4115 53°51′59″N 1°55′18″W			
	Notes: National Building Register:62340: (B)				
Castle Mill		Keighley, SE 0519 4092 53°51′52″N 1°55′21″W			
	Notes: National Building Register:62368: (B)				
Cavendish Mill		Keighley, SE 0624 4125 53°52′03″N 1°54′24″W			
	Notes: National Building Register:62353: (B)				
Coney Lane Works		Keighley, SE 0629 4100 53°51′55″N 1°54′21″W			
	Notes: National Building Register:62359 : (B)				
Crown Saw Mills		Keighley, SE 0645 4093 53°51′52″N 1°54′12″W			
	Notes: National Building Register:62360: (B)				
Cyclops Works, Marley Street		Keighley, SE 0612 4070 53°51′45″N 1°54′30″W			
	Notes: National Building Register:62366: (B)				
Dalton Mills		Keighley, SE 0699 4137 53°52′07″N 1°53′43″W			
	Notes: National Building Register:62300: (A)				
Damems Mill		Keighley, SE 0510 3879 53°50′43″N 1°55′26″W			
	Notes: National Building Register:62665: (B)				
Devonshire Mills		Keighley, SE 0565 4117 53°52′00″N 1°54′56″W			
	Notes: National Building Register:62341: (A)				
Dyeworks		Keighley, SE 0708 4165 53°52′16″N 1°53′38″W			
	Notes: National Building Register:62299 : (B)				
Eastwood Mill		Keighley, SE 0735 4170 53°52′17″N 1°53′23″W			
	Notes: National Building Register:62298: (B)				
Fleece Mill		Keighley, SE 0630 4125 53°52′03″N 1°54′20″W			
	Notes: National Building Register:62355: (B)				
Goodley Works		Keighley, SE 0309 3889 53°50′46″N 1°57′16″W			
	Notes: National Building Register:62642: (B)				
Goose Eye Mill		Keighley, SE 0280 4056 53°51′40″N 1°57′32″W			
	Notes: National Building Register:62336: (B)				
Greengate Mills		Keighley, SE 0605 4049 53°51′38″N 1°54′34″W			
	Notes: National Building Register:62367 : (B)				
Grove Mill		Keighley, SE 0545 3960 53°51′09″N 1°55′07″W			
	Notes: National Building Register:62664 : (B)				
Hanover Mill		Keighley, SE 0625 4120 53°52′01″N 1°54′23″W			
	Notes: National Building Register:62354 : (B)				
High Mill, Newsholme		Keighley, SE 0187 3963 53°51′10″N 1°58′23″W			
	Notes: National Building Register:62636 : (B)				
Higher Holme Mill		Keighley, SE 0230 4022 53°51′29″N 1°57′59″W			
	Notes: National Building Register:62335 : (B)				
Holme Mill		Keighley, SE 0471 4090 53°51′51″N 1°55′47″W			
	Notes: National Building Register:62338 : (B)				
Holme Mill		Keighley,			
	Notes: (see Higher Holme Mill)				
Hope Mill		Keighley, SE 0596 4045 53°51′37″N 1°54′39″W			
	Notes: National Building Register:62350: (B)				
Ingrow Mill		Keighley, SE 0555 3972 53°51′13″N 1°55′02″W			
	Notes: National Building Register:62663 : (B)				
Kensington Sheds		Keighley, SE 0558 4070 53°51′45″N 1°55′00″W			
	Notes: National Building Register:62345 : (B)				
Knowle Mill		Keighley, SE 0600 4035 53°51′34″N 1°54′37″W			
	Notes: National Building Register:62351: (A)				
Low Bridge Mill		Keighley, SE 0629 4085 53°51′50″N 1°54′21″W			
	Notes: National Building Register:62361: (B)				
Low Mill		Keighley, SE 0660 4120 53°52′01″N 1°54′04″W			
	Notes: National Building Register:62356 : (B)				
Low Mill, Newsholme		Keighley, SE 0209 3963 53°51′10″N 1°58′11″W			
	Notes: National Building Register:62639 : (B)				
Low Street Mill		Keighley, SE 0635 4110 53°51′58″N 1°54′18″W			
	Notes: National Building Register:62358: (B)				
Lower Holme Mill		Keighley, SE 0476 4091 53°51′52″N 1°55′45″W			
	Notes: National Building Register:62339: (B)				
Lower Providence Mill		Keighley, SE 0340 3827 53°50′26″N 1°56′59″W			
	Notes: National Building Register:62644: (A)				
Marley Street Mill		Keighley, SE 0610 4073 53°51′46″N 1°54′31″W			
	Notes: National Building Register:62365: (B)				
Melbourne Mills		Keighley, SE 0699 4154 53°52′12″N 1°53′43″W			
	Notes: National Building Register:62295: (B)				
Mill		Keighley, SE 0640 4202 53°52′28″N 1°54′15″W			
	Notes: National Building Register:62294: (B)				
North Beck Mill		Keighley, SE 0545 4095 53°51′53″N 1°55′07″W			
	Notes: National Building Register:62343: (B)				
Oakworth Mill		Keighley, SE 0305 3875 53°50′42″N 1°57′18″W			
	Notes: National Building Register:62643: (B)				
Peel Mills		Keighley, SE 0595 4070 53°51′45″N 1°54′40″W			
	Notes: National Building Register:62349: (B)				
Ponden Mill		Keighley, SD 9989 3721 53°49′52″N 2°00′11″W			
	Notes: National Building Register:62159: (A)				
Prospect Mill		Keighley, SE 0575 3998 53°51′22″N 1°54′51″W			
	Notes: National Building Register:62662: (B)				
Rhone Mill		Keighley, SE 0647 4079 53°51′48″N 1°54′11″W			
	Notes: National Building Register:62362: (B)				
Royal Works, Goulbourne Street		Keighley, SE 0585 4070 53°51′45″N 1°54′45″W			
	Notes: National Building Register:62346: (B)				
Royd Works		Keighley, SE 0600 4255 53°52′45″N 1°54′37″W			
	Notes: National Building Register:62370: (B)				
Springfield Mills		Keighley, SE 0570 4094 53°51′53″N 1°54′53″W			
	Notes: National Building Register:62344: (B)				
Springhead Mill		Keighley, SE 0301 3780 53°50′11″N 1°57′21″W			
	Notes: National Building Register:62646: (B)				
Strong Close Mill		Keighley,			
	Notes: (see Dalton Mills)				
Stubbing House Mill		Keighley,			
	Notes: (see Aireworth Mills)				
Turkey Mill		Keighley, SE 02335 4061 53°58′57″N 1°57′57″W			
	Notes: National Building Register:37153: (B)				
Upper Providence Mill		Keighley, SE 0330 3838 53°50′30″N 1°57′05″W			
	Notes: National Building Register:62675: (C)				
Walk Mill		Keighley, SE 0625 4070 53°51′45″N 1°54′23″W			
	Notes: National Building Register:62364: (B)				
West Lane Mill		Keighley,			
	Notes: (see Calversyke Mill)				
Worsted Mill, Goulbourne Street		Keighley, SE 0573 4069 53°51′45″N 1°54′52″W			
	Notes: National Building Register:62369: (B)				

== Morton (Keighley) ==
Name	Architect	Location	Built	Demolished	Served (Years)
Botany Mills		Morton (Keighley), SE 1010 4255 53°52′45″N 1°50′52″W			
	Notes: National Building Register:62302: (C)				
New Woodhead Worsted Mill		Morton (Keighley), SE 0680 4340 53°53′12″N 1°53′53″W			
	Notes: National Building Register:62371: (C)				

== Shipley with Saltaire ==
Name	Architect	Location	Built	Demolished	Served (Years)
Airedale Mills		Shipley, SE 1490 3785 53°50′12″N 1°46′30″W			
	Notes: National Building Register:62433: (B)				
Airedaleworks		Shipley, SE 1508 3790 53°50′14″N 1°46′20″W			
	Notes: National Building Register:62464: (B)				
Ashley Mills		Shipley, SE 1455 3780 53°50′10″N 1°46′49″W			
	Notes: National Building Register:62432: (B)				
Hirst Mill		Shipley, SE 1306 3837 53°50′29″N 1°48′11″W			
	Notes: National Building Register:62416: (B)				
Orbic Works		Shipley, SE 1445 3785 53°50′12″N 1°46′55″W			
	Notes: National Building Register:62431: (B)				
Park Works		Shipley, SE 1471 3768 53°50′07″N 1°46′41″W			
	Notes: National Building Register:62434: (B)				
Providence Mill		Shipley,			
	Notes: (see Airedale Mills)				
Red Beck Mill		Shipley, SE 1499 3668 53°49′34″N 1°46′26″W			
	Notes: National Building Register:62438: (B)				
Red Beck Mill		Shipley, SE 1492 3670 53°49′35″N 1°46′29″W			
	Notes: National Building Register:62437: (B)				
Rosse Street Mills		Shipley, SE 1460 3760 53°50′04″N 1°46′47″W			
	Notes: National Building Register:62435: (B)				
Saltaire Mills		Shipley, SE 142 382 53°50′23″N 1°47′08″W			
	Notes: National Building Register:41553: ) (A)				
Spring Dyeworks		Shipley,			
	Notes: (see Red Beck Mill, 62437)				
Union Mill		Shipley, SE 1515 3760 53°50′04″N 1°46′17″W			
	Notes: National Building Register:62467: (B)				
Victoriaworks		Shipley, SE 1470 3800 53°50′17″N 1°46′41″W			
	Notes: National Building Register:62430: (B)				

== Skipton ==
Name	Architect	Location	Built	Demolished	Served (Years)
Belle Vue Mills		Skipton, SD 9861 5160 53°57′38″N 2°01′22″W			
	Notes: National Building Register:62117: (A)				
Broughton Road Shed		Skipton, SD 9770 5145 53°57′33″N 2°02′12″W			
	Notes: National Building Register:62123: (A)				
Firth Sheds		Skipton, SD 9905 5105 53°57′20″N 2°00′57″W			
	Notes: National Building Register:62120: (B)				
High Mill		Skipton, SD 9919 5214 53°57′55″N 2°00′50″W			
	Notes: National Building Register:62121: (C)				
Low Mill		Skipton, SD 9905 5125 53°57′26″N 2°00′57″W			
	Notes: National Building Register:62119: (B)				
Park Hill		Skipton, SD 9939 5161 53°57′38″N 2°00′39″W			
	Notes: National Building Register:62122: (B)				
Union Mills		Skipton, SD 989 511 53°57′21″N 2°01′06″W			
	Notes: National Building Register:62118: ) (A)				
Victoria Mill		Skipton, SD 9869 5170 53°57′41″N 2°01′17″W			
	Notes: National Building Register:44101: (B)				

== Thornton (Denholme; Thornton) ==
Name	Architect	Location	Built	Demolished	Served (Years)
Albion Mill (T)		Thornton (Denholme; Thornton), SE 0905 3285 53°47′31″N 1°51′51″W			
	Notes: National Building Register:62386: (C)				
Denholme Mills (D)		Thornton (Denholme; Thornton), SE 067 337 53°47′58″N 1°53′59″W			
	Notes: National Building Register:62374: ) (B)				
Dole Mill (T)		Thornton (Denholme; Thornton), SE 1011 3261 53°47′23″N 1°50′53″W			
	Notes: National Building Register:62395: (C)				
Excelsior Mills (T)		Thornton (Denholme; Thornton), SE 0865 3275 53°47′28″N 1°52′13″W			
	Notes: National Building Register:62377: (B)				
Foreside Works (D)		Thornton (Denholme; Thornton), SE 0700 3225 53°47′11″N 1°53′43″W			
	Notes: National Building Register:62375: (B)				
Leventhorpe Mill(T)		Thornton (Denholme; Thornton), SE 1251 3289 53°47′32″N 1°48′42″W			
	Notes: National Building Register:62411: (B)				
New Mill (T)		Thornton (Denholme; Thornton), SE 0969 3295 53°47′34″N 1°51′16″W			
	Notes: National Building Register:62387: (B)				
Prospect Mill (T)		Thornton (Denholme; Thornton), SE 1017 3262 53°47′23″N 1°50′50″W			
	Notes: National Building Register:62396: (A)				
Thornton Mills		Thornton (Denholme; Thornton),			
	Notes: (see New Mill)				
West Scholes Mill (T)		Thornton (Denholme; Thornton), SE 0985 3140 53°46′44″N 1°51′07″W			
	Notes: National Building Register:62388: (B)				

== Wilsden (Bingley) ==
Name	Architect	Location	Built	Demolished	Served (Years)
Albion Mills		Wilsden (Bingley), SE 0930 3635 53°49′24″N 1°51′37″W			
	Notes: National Building Register:62381: (B)				
Bents Mill		Wilsden (Bingley), SE 0777 3643 53°49′27″N 1°53′00″W			
	Notes: National Building Register:62677: (B)				
Birkshead Mill		Wilsden (Bingley), SE 0975 3610 53°49′16″N 1°51′12″W			
	Notes: National Building Register:62382: (B)				
Hewenden Mill		Wilsden (Bingley), SE 0778 3608 53°49′15″N 1°53′00″W			
	Notes: National Building Register:62667: (B)				
Lingbob Mill		Wilsden (Bingley), SE 0950 3570 53°49′03″N 1°51′26″W			
	Notes: National Building Register:62385: (B)				
Prospect Mill		Wilsden (Bingley), SE 0939 3570 53°49′03″N 1°51′32″W			
	Notes: National Building Register:62384: (B)				
Providence Mill		Wilsden (Bingley), SE 0903 3665 53°49′34″N 1°51′51″W			
	Notes: National Building Register:62379: (B)				
Spring Mill		Wilsden (Bingley), SE 0915 3645 53°49′27″N 1°51′45″W			
	Notes: National Building Register:62380: (A)				
Well House Mill		Wilsden (Bingley), SE 0942 3515 53°48′45″N 1°51′30″W			
	Notes: National Building Register:62383: (B)				

== See also ==
- Heavy Woollen District
- Textile processing
