= Worth Township, Illinois =

Worth Township, Illinois may refer to the following places:

- Worth Township, Cook County, Illinois
- Worth Township, Woodford County, Illinois

See also

- Worth Township (disambiguation)
