= Laycock, West Yorkshire =

Village in West Yorkshire, England

Coordinates: 53.865084°N 1.953562°W

Laycock
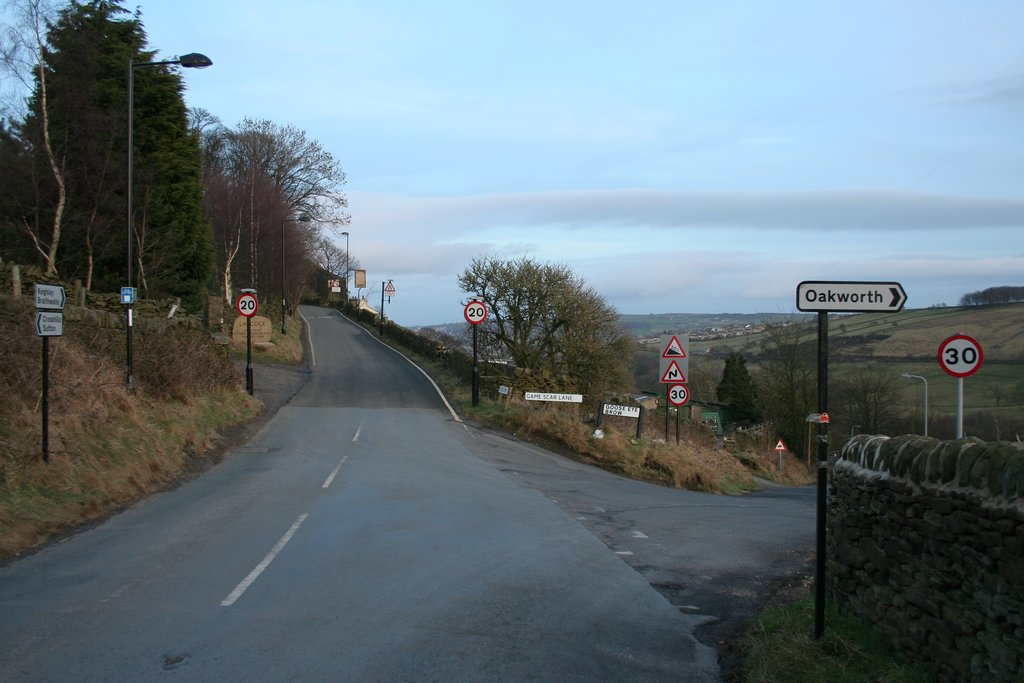
- Looking eastwards with Laycock Lane on the left and Game Scar Lane on the right

- Location within West Yorkshire
- OS grid reference: SE0340
- Metropolitan borough: City of Bradford
- Metropolitan county: West Yorkshire
- Region: Yorkshire and the Humber
- Country: England
- Sovereign state: United Kingdom
- Post town: Keighley
- Postcode district: BD22
- Dialling code: 01535
- Police: West Yorkshire
- Fire: West Yorkshire
- Ambulance: Yorkshire

Laycock is a small village in the Bradford District of West Yorkshire that overlooks the hamlet of Goose Eye. The village is 1.9 miles (3 km) west of the town of Keighley and 1.2 miles (2 km) north of Oakworth village. The village is in the council ward of Keighley West.

== History ==
Laycock is mentioned in the Domesday Book as having two Carucates of land and was originally part of the Oakworth township, before becoming part of Keighley in the 13th century. The name Laycock is the same as Lacock, which derives from the Old English meaning, stream or watercourse; Laycock village is on Laycock Beck, which feeds into North Beck a tributary of the River Worth.

The village is the setting for William Sharp (also known as Old Three Laps) who was jilted by his bride in 1807. He apparently took to his bed in Whorles Farm near to Laycock for the rest of his life, which ended 49 years later in 1856. One local historian said that Sharp was a victim of an age when mental illness and its treatment was not well understood.

In his book Through Airedale from Goole to Malham, Speight mentions that Laycock is one of the handful of locations throughout Airedale where the village had a Maypole. The rite of dancing around the Maypole was rescinded in an act put through Parliament by Charles I in 1644, where it was labeled as "a heathenish vanity."

Laycock overlooks the hamlet of Goose Eye, which is just south of the village. Goose Eye is famous for its independent brewery and pub, although the brewery is now situated in Crossflatts, Bingley. Like many places in this region (Bingley, Haworth for example) the two villages have a selection of cobbled (or "setted") roads.

TLC buses operate a circular service from Keighley through to Stanbury and Haworth which passes through Laycock. This runs to just four services per day Monday to Saturday with no service on Sundays.

Laycock has a primary school on Laycock Lane (the main road through the village) which was rated as 'Good' by Ofsted in 2014. There are just under 100 pupils at the school with an age range of 4-11. The village hall was built in 1927 (partly funded by South African tycoon Sir Abraham Bailey, who grew up in the village) and regularly hosted the Bronte Blues Club events between 2007 and 2015. The Blues Club events attracted many famous names over the years such as Andy Fairweather-Low, Doug MacLeod, Hamilton Loomis and Sherman Robinson.

== See also ==
- Listed buildings in Keighley
