= Goose Eye =

Hamlet in West Yorkshire, England

Coordinates: 53.8616°N 1.9587°W

- Hamlet
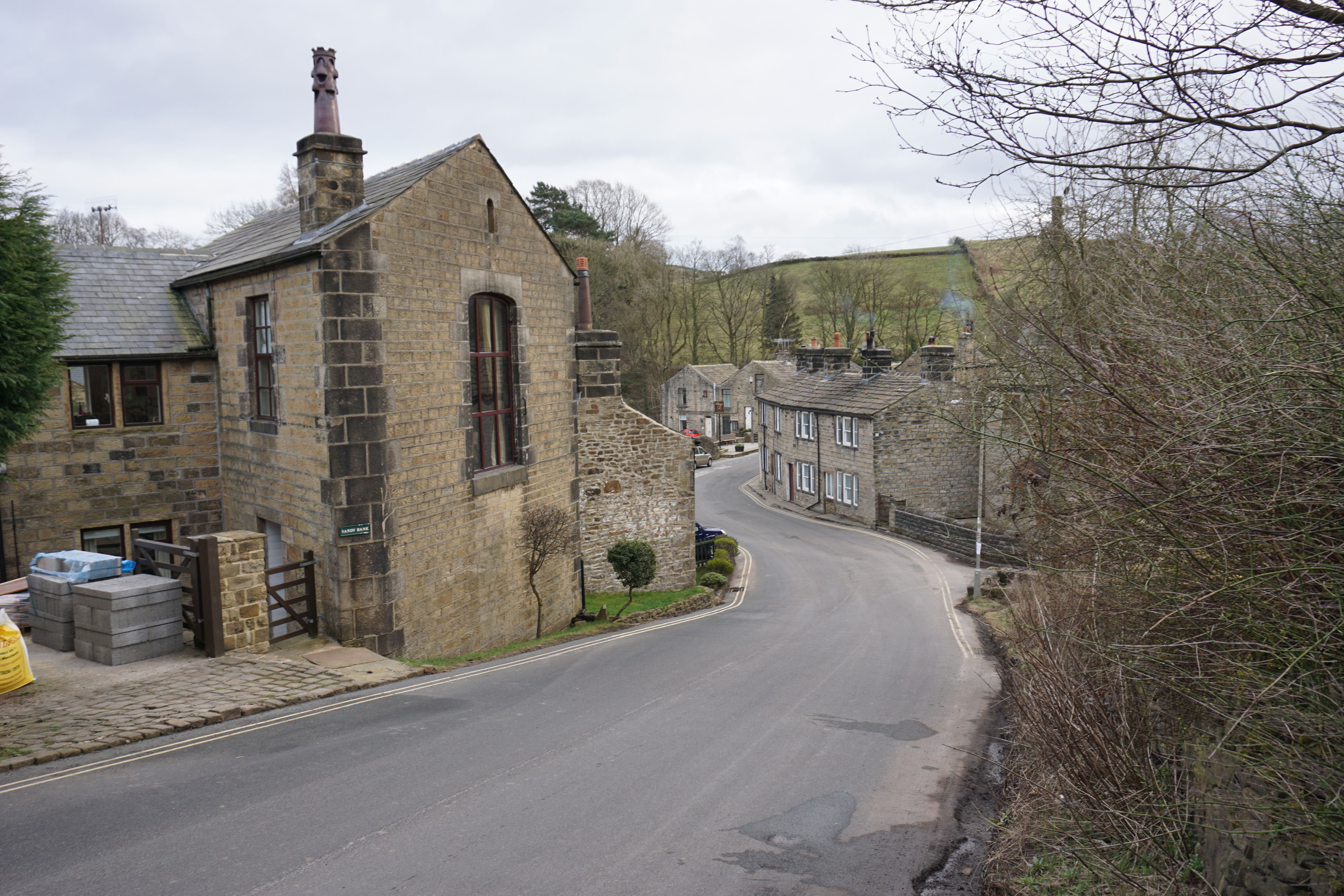
- Goose Eye

- Location within West Yorkshire
- Population: 85 (estimated 1996)
- OS grid reference: SE028405
- Civil parish: Keighley
- Metropolitan borough: City of Bradford
- Metropolitan county: West Yorkshire
- Region: Yorkshire and the Humber
- Country: England
- Sovereign state: United Kingdom
- Post town: KEIGHLEY
- Postcode district: BD22
- Police: West Yorkshire
- Fire: West Yorkshire
- Ambulance: Yorkshire

Goose Eye is a hamlet in the civil parish of Keighley, in West Yorkshire, England. The hamlet grew up around the mill which was built there in the later 18th century. The hamlet retains its 19th-century industrial character, and it is only 2.5 miles (4 km) west of Keighley. North Beck flows through the hamlet, and its waters were an important part of the development of the village as the power for the mills. The hamlet was notable in the valley bottom, with its 200 feet (61 m) chimney for Turkey Mill. The hamlet is part of the Bradford District.

== History ==
The hamlet was centred around two worsted mills, one of which became a papermill that was used until the early part of the 20th-century, and latterly used to print paper for bank notes. Turkey Mill was built in 1797 to process cotton, but soon ran into difficulties due to the isolation of the mill in the North Beck valley and the flourishing of the nearby Lancashire cotton industry. Turkey Mill then changed to being a worsted mill, and finally, a paper mill. Rag Mill, the most westerly of the mills in Goose Eye, was so-called because its sorted rags to be mixed with wood pulp to produce paper, though it started out in 1791 as Brow End Mill. Rag Mill is now a grade II listed building and has been converted into housing. Likewise, Turkey Mill was converted to housing in 2000, whilst the 200 feet (61 m) chimney, which had become a local landmark, was demolished in 1971. A small quarry also operated near to Goose Eye, which worked the Millstone Grit series for rough rock flagstones.

There are many explanations for the unusual name of the village, with some sources stating that the eye is derived from ea, an Old English word meaning water. Another version suggest the Eye comes the Old English hee which means height; the whole name deriving from the height that geese would fly.

The hamlet used to have its own brewery, named Goose Eye Brewery which started in 1970 in the old paper mill (Turkey Mill) but it moved to a new location in Crossflatts, near Bingley. The brewery was located next to the Turkey Inn, and supplied beer to the pub. The Turkey Inn is a listed building, and besides the two former mills, several cottages and two river crossings are also listed, with all of them being grade II.

Along with the nearby settlement of Laycock, Goose Eye has retained its 19th-century character and the two settlements for a conservation area. The hamlet is just to the south of Laycock and 4 kilometres (2.5 mi) west of Keighley. Goose Eye is in the civil parish of Keighley, and is represented at Westminster as part of the Keighley and Ilkley Constituency. Both hamlets of Laycock and Goose Eye have a designated conservation area, which was approved in 1975.

The steep climb out of Goose Eye uphill towards Laycock become the Cote de Goose Eye in the 2015 iteration of the Tour de Yorkshire cycle race.

== See also ==
- Listed buildings in Keighley
