= Worth Township =

Worth Township may refer to:

== Illinois ==
- Worth Township, Cook County, Illinois
- Worth Township, Woodford County, Illinois

== Indiana ==
- Worth Township, Boone County, Indiana

== Iowa ==
- Worth Township, Boone County, Iowa

== Michigan ==
- Worth Township, Michigan

== Pennsylvania ==
- Worth Township, Butler County, Pennsylvania
- Worth Township, Centre County, Pennsylvania
- Worth Township, Mercer County, Pennsylvania

== See also ==
- Worth (disambiguation)
