= Cackleshaw =

Hamlet in West Yorkshire, England

Coordinates: 53.845°N 01.941°W

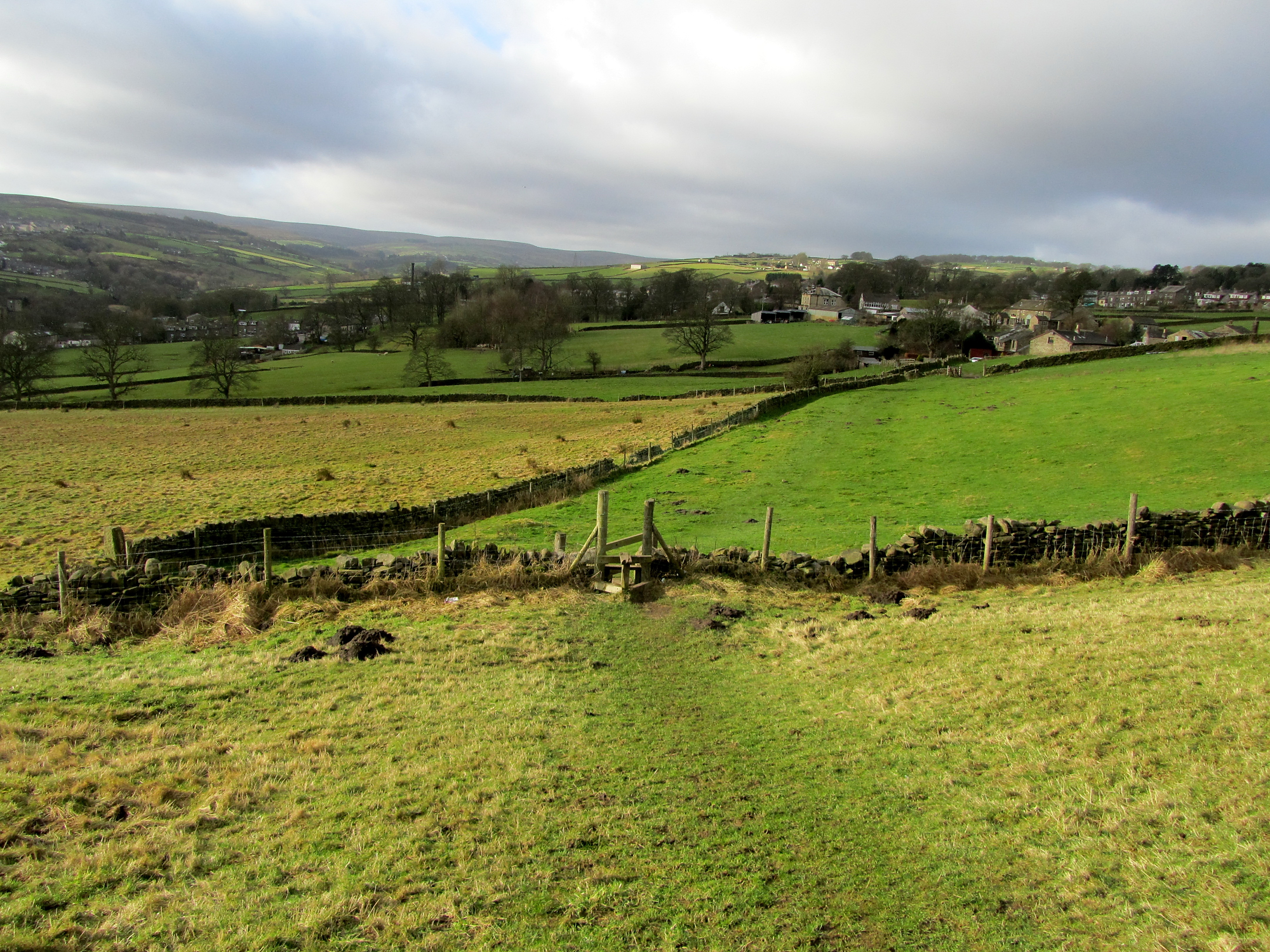
- View towards Cackleshaw from the east

- Location within West Yorkshire
- OS grid reference: SE0338
- Metropolitan borough: City of Bradford
- Metropolitan county: West Yorkshire
- Region: Yorkshire and the Humber
- Country: England
- Sovereign state: United Kingdom
- Post town: KEIGHLEY
- Postcode district: BD22
- Dialling code: 01535
- Police: West Yorkshire
- Fire: West Yorkshire
- Ambulance: Yorkshire

Cackleshaw is a hamlet in West Yorkshire, England. It is located about one-third of a mile (0.5 km) east of Oakworth in the Worth Valley area of the City of Bradford. The name of the hamlet has been recorded historically as Cackeleshawe, Cackelshay, Cackwelshey and Cockleshaw. This derives from the Old English of kakele (a cackler, or a nickname) and Sceagh, which means copse.

Historically, the main occupation in the hamlet was farming, with much of the land tenanted from the Duke of Devonshire's estate.

Cackleshaw is on the 11-mile (18 km) circular Worth Way walk which starts and ends in Keighley. The walk follows the river and railway first up, then down the Worth Valley.
