= Wörth =

Wörth or Woerth may refer to:

== Places ==
=== Germany ===
- Wörth am Main, Miltenberg district, Bavaria
- Wörth am Rhein, Germersheim district, Rhineland-Palatinate
- Wörth an der Donau, Regensburg district, Bavaria
- Wörth an der Isar, Landshut district, Bavaria
- Wörth, Upper Bavaria, Erding district, Bavaria
- Donauwörth, Donau-Ries district, Bavaria
- Wörth, Worthsee, an island in Lake Wörth, Bavaria, Germany

=== Elsewhere ===
- Wœrth, a town in Bas-Rhin, Alsace, France
- Wörth Castle, Neuhausen am Rheinfall in the canton of Schaffhausen, Switzerland
- Lake Wörth (disambiguation), multiple lakes

== Other uses ==
- SMS Wörth, an 1892 ship of the German Navy
- Battle of Wœrth, fought in 1870, near Wœrth, Alsace, France
- Éric Woerth (born 1956), French politician
