= Fort Worth (disambiguation) =

Fort Worth is a city in the state of Texas.

Fort Worth may also refer to:

- Fort Worth, Virginia, an American Civil War fortification
- Fort Worth (film), a 1951 American western
- Naval Air Station Joint Reserve Base Fort Worth, an American military airbase
- USS Fort Worth, a littoral combat ship of the United States Navy
