= Lake Wörth =

Lake Wörth may refer to:

- Wörthsee, a glacial lake in the Starnberg district of Bavaria, Germany
- Wörthersee, an alpine lake in the southern Austrian state of Carinthia
