= Low Mill =

Disused mill in Keighley, West Yorkshire, England

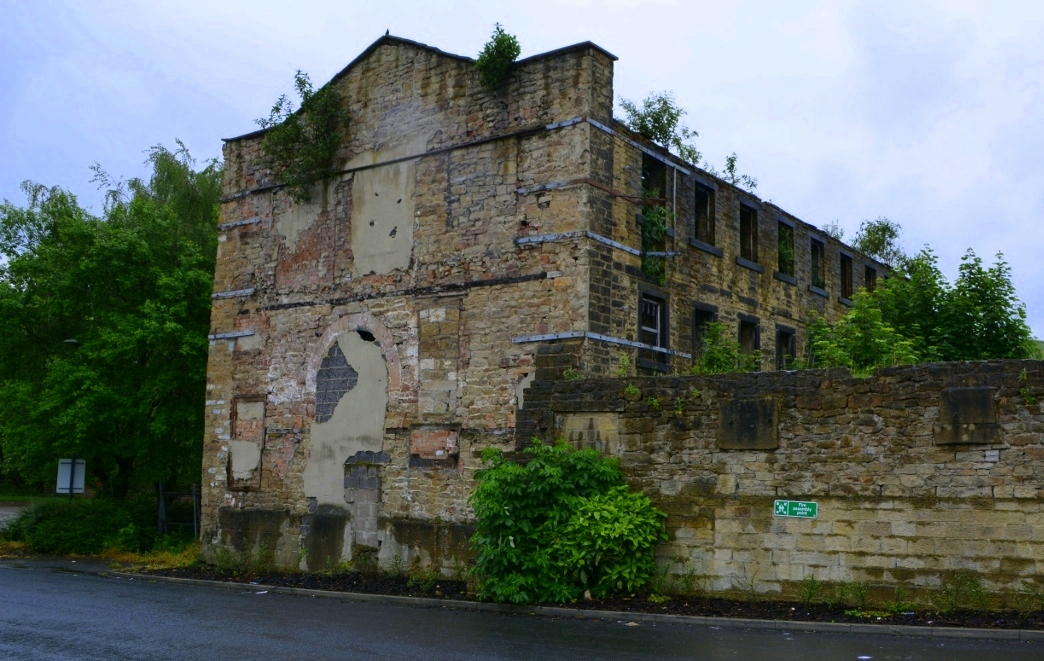
- Low Mill, Keighley; north east face, looking south west

- Location within West Yorkshire

Cotton Worsted
- Current status: Derelict
- Location: Gresley Road, Keighley, West Yorkshire, England
- Coordinates: 53.866°N 1.901°W

Construction
- Built: 1776
- Completed: 1780

Equipment

Listed Building – Grade II*
- Designated: 12 February 1979
- Reference no.: 1200162

Low Mill is a former textile mill in Keighley, West Yorkshire, England. It was the first industrial building in Keighley, and the first mill in Yorkshire to spin cotton, however, it later changed to being a worsted mill. The mill is now derelict and is a grade II* listed building, one of two in the town of Keighley. Its state of dereliction has led Historic England to place it on their 'at risk' register.

== History ==
Building of the mill was started in 1776 by Thomas Ramsden, but it was completed in 1780 by the Clayton Brothers. It was opened in 1780, and was the first industrial building in Keighley, whilst also being the first purpose built cotton-spinning mill in Yorkshire. Initially, the mill was powered by a waterwheel, using the adjacent River Worth, but the opening of the Leeds and Liverpool Canal in 1773, greatly increased importation of coal into Keighley, and the mill eventually became steam powered.

To generate enough water pressure to power the mill-wheel, a large dam covering 2 acres (0.81 ha) was built which was fed by a mill-race (goit). A weir, some 200 yards (180 m) upstream, near to where North Beck enters the river, was built to feed the mill-race. This proved problematic for other mills downstream, most notably Dalton Mills further downstream, who had a long-standing argument over the amount of water being diverted into Low Mill.

The cotton-spinning equipment was built under the direction of Sir Richard Arkwright, and a clutch of employees from Keighley travelled in 1780 to Arkwright's mill in Cromford, Derbyshire, for instruction on using the machines. The mill was the only one in Yorkshire to use the patented Arkwright water frames under licence, but inflated charges deterred others from using Arkwright's machines. Between 1780 and 1787, the owners paid £4,200 to Arkwright and his partner in royalties for using the machines. At some point in the 19th century, the mill was converted to the manufacture of worsted, but its greatest employment year was in 1803, when over 200 workers had jobs at the mill; this made Low Mill the largest mill in Keighley in terms of employment.

== Details ==
The mill was built on a north–south axis and had three storeys. Originally, the mill building was part of a larger site, however, the rest of the site has been levelled, with only the listed Low Mill structure left standing. The area of derelict land which the mill sits in covers 0.8 acres (0.32 ha), and the combined mill floor-space is 6,230 square feet (579 m^{2}). Low Mill is a grade II* listed building. A steam engine was built in the mill c. 1785, not for processing cotton, but for returning discharged water from the mill race into the dam above the mill.

Since 2015, the site has been listed on the Historic England's Heritage at Risk Register. Sometime during the 21st century, the historic water features in and around the mill have been concreted over, with Historic England describing the concreting as "..[an] act of heritage crime."
