= Watersheddles Reservoir =

Reservoir in Lancashire, England

- Water Sheddles
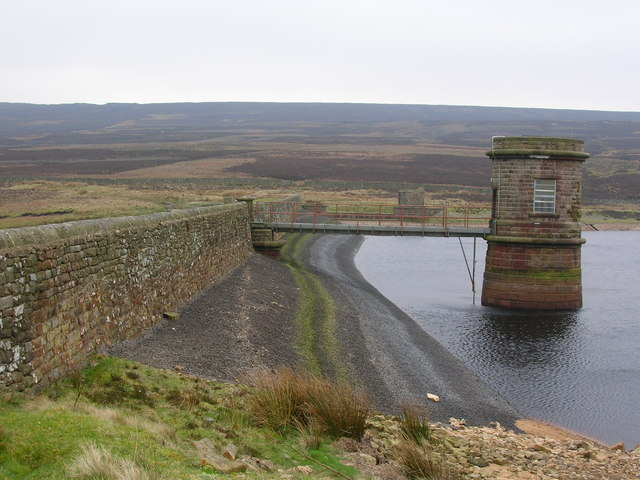
- Dam and valve tower, Watersheddles Reservoir

- Location in Lancashire
- Location: Borough of Pendle, Lancashire
- Coordinates: 53.8390°N 2.0512°W
- Type: Reservoir
- Primary outflows: River Worth
- Catchment area: 560 acres (225 ha)
- Basin countries: England
- Managing agency: Yorkshire Water
- Built: 1871–1877
- First flooded: 1877
- Surface area: 27 acres (11 ha)
- Average depth: 18 feet (5.5 m)
- Max. depth: 49 feet (15 m)
- Water volume: 28,300,000 cubic feet (801,000 m^{3})
- Shore length^{1}: 1.2 miles (2 km)
- Surface elevation: 1,099 feet (335 m)
- ^{1} Shore length is not a well-defined measure.

Watersheddles Reservoir is an upland artificial lake in Lancashire, England. The reservoir was opened in 1877 by the Keighley Corporation Waterworks, and is now owned by Yorkshire Water. It supplies water to the Worth Valley and Keighley area and compounds several streams at the source of the River Worth.

Although the reservoir is just across the boundary of Lancashire, all of the water is used in the West Yorkshire region.

Due to the peatland in the immediate catchment area, the reservoir is prone to a high acidity and discolouration in its water.

== History ==
The building of the three reservoirs in the Upper Worth Valley (Watersheddles, Ponden and Lower Laithe), was so that the Keighley area could have a supply of fresh drinking water, and also in response to several droughts in the 1860s. These droughts forced residents in the Upper Worth Valley to raid mill-ponds for drinking water.

In response to the flooding, and as part of their endeavour to improve the water supply in Keighley and its environs, the Keighley Waterworks Extension and Improvement Act 1869 (32 & 33 Vict. c. cxxix) was passed to allow the Keighley Local Board of Health to build:

"...an aqueduct, conduit, or watercourse commencing in the hamlet or liberty of Oakworth, in the township and parish of Keighley, in the said West Riding, at a point situate upon the stream called White Reaps Clough, distant 132 yards, or thereabouts, from the junction of the said stream with another stream called Dean Clough, and terminating in the northern side of the intended Water Sheddles Reservoir (proposed to be constructed by the Local Board under the powers of "The Keighley Waterworks Extension and Improvement Act, 1869 ") at a point 35 yards to the south of another point 320 yards distant (measured along the highway next hereinafter mentioned) from the Standing Stone on the boundary between the counties of York and Lancaster, such stone being placed on the highway leading from Keighley to Colne, such termination being in the hamlet of Wycoller...."

So although the reservoir would dam the River Worth, it would be located 100 yards (91 m) over the county boundary in Lancashire, a situation that still exists today, with the reservoir in the Borough of Pendle, but with a Bradford (BD) postcode. The reservoir needed to be quite elevated in comparison to the town of Keighley, so that the water pressure would be sufficient to pump water to the uppermost areas of the town and adjoining localities.

The name, which is recorded both as Watersheddles and Water Sheddles, is thought to have derived from Middle English meaning "the parting of the waters". The name is borrowed from a nearby boundary stone on the road between Stanbury and Laneshaw Bridge. (Note: Certain archaic documents also label the site as Water Shackles.)

Although the contract for the building of the reservoir was awarded to Walker and Taylor of Crewe in June 1870, the reservoir was not started until August 1871, with full use and final flooding in 1877. (Note: The contract for the nearby (downstream) Ponden Reservoir, was also awarded to Walker and Taylor. Their original intent, was that work was estimated at one year, in the event, problems with puddling, meant the works took nearly five years. Watersheddles suffered from the same issue of puddling.) A deal was agreed with the mill owners along the River Worth that guaranteed a ready-supply of water; every morning and every evening, the sluices were opened to allow a regulated flow of water down the valley to enable the mills to restock their ponds. Keighley Corporation Waterworks operated the reservoir until 1959, when it was folded into the newly created Craven Water Board (CWB). The CWB, itself, was subsumed into Yorkshire Water in 1974. Whilst Yorkshire Water own the reservoir, unlike other reservoirs nearby that are in West Yorkshire, they do not own the surrounding land which drains into Watersheddles.

Due to its location and the surrounding topography, the overflow channel is very steep (1 in 2.5) and the length of spillway is 330 feet (100 m) long, with the width being 11 feet (3.5 m). The dam height is 72 feet (22 m) and the dam wall stretches for 132 yards (121 m).

The maximum capacity of the reservoir is 191,000,000 imperial gallons; 229,000,000 US gallons (867,000,000 L), (28,300,000 cubic feet (801,000 m^{3})), and, along with Keighley Moor Reservoir, supplies 5% of its maximum volume on a daily basis for drinking water. The reservoir is located some 3 miles (4.8 km) west of Stanbury and at an elevation of 1,099 feet (335 m). It has a maximum depth of 49 feet (15 m), an average depth of 18 feet (5.5 m) and has a catchment area of 560 acres (225 ha).

The short-distance path the Brontë Way, runs alongside the northern edge of the reservoir.

== Hydrometry ==
Water from the reservoir is sent to a water treatment works (WTW) at Oldfield on the north side of the Worth Valley. Oldfield WTW also receives water from Keighley Moor Reservoir, and between the two, they supply over 1,800,000 imperial gallons; 2,100,000 US gallons (8,000,000 L) per day. Oldfield was opened in 1891 in an effort to treat the water from the reservoirs as the acidic water was eating into the pipes and poisoning the water with lead. A report from 1897 relays how the water is cleared through limestone, coke, sand and "polarite", (Note: In this context, it is unclear what "Polarite" actually is, as the mineral polarite was first described in 1969) but suffered from discolouration arising from peat sediment settling on the bottom of the reservoir. In 1973, just before Yorkshire Water assumed control of Watersheddles and Oldfield WTW, the pH of water arriving at Oldfield was registered as being between 6.9 and 7.0.

A schematic of the Worth Valley reservoirs and their drinking water supply. All reservoirs feed the River Worth - Watersheddles and Ponden directly and Keighley Moor and Lower Laithe by North Beck and Sladen Beck respectively.

The waters entering the reservoir drain a peat moorland with millstone grit underlying. The water was recorded with a pH value of 4.1 in 1988 and has been noted for its 'colour', which takes a more intensive process to remedy at the WTW. The problems of the pH value at Watersheddles (and to an extent, Keighley Moor Reservoir) were so bad, that Yorkshire Water designed and built their own prototype triple-pH controller in 1988 to regulate the waters acidity.

In the late 1890s and early 1900s, a rain gauge was sited at Watersheddles, the results of which are given below;

Year	Rainfall	Ref	Year	Rainfall	Ref	Year	Rainfall	Ref
1897	49.83 inches (1,266 mm)		1904	46.36 inches (1,178 mm)		1908	50.6 inches (1,290 mm)	
1898	44.53 inches (1,131 mm)		1906	54.33 inches (1,380 mm)		1911	36.49 inches (927 mm)	
1900	51.73 inches (1,314 mm)		1907	55.57 inches (1,411 mm)		1913	45.35 inches (1,152 mm)	

The water at the reservoir between 2013 and 2016 was assessed as moderate for ecological quality and good for chemical quality.
