= Ponden Reservoir =

Reservoir in West Yorkshire, England

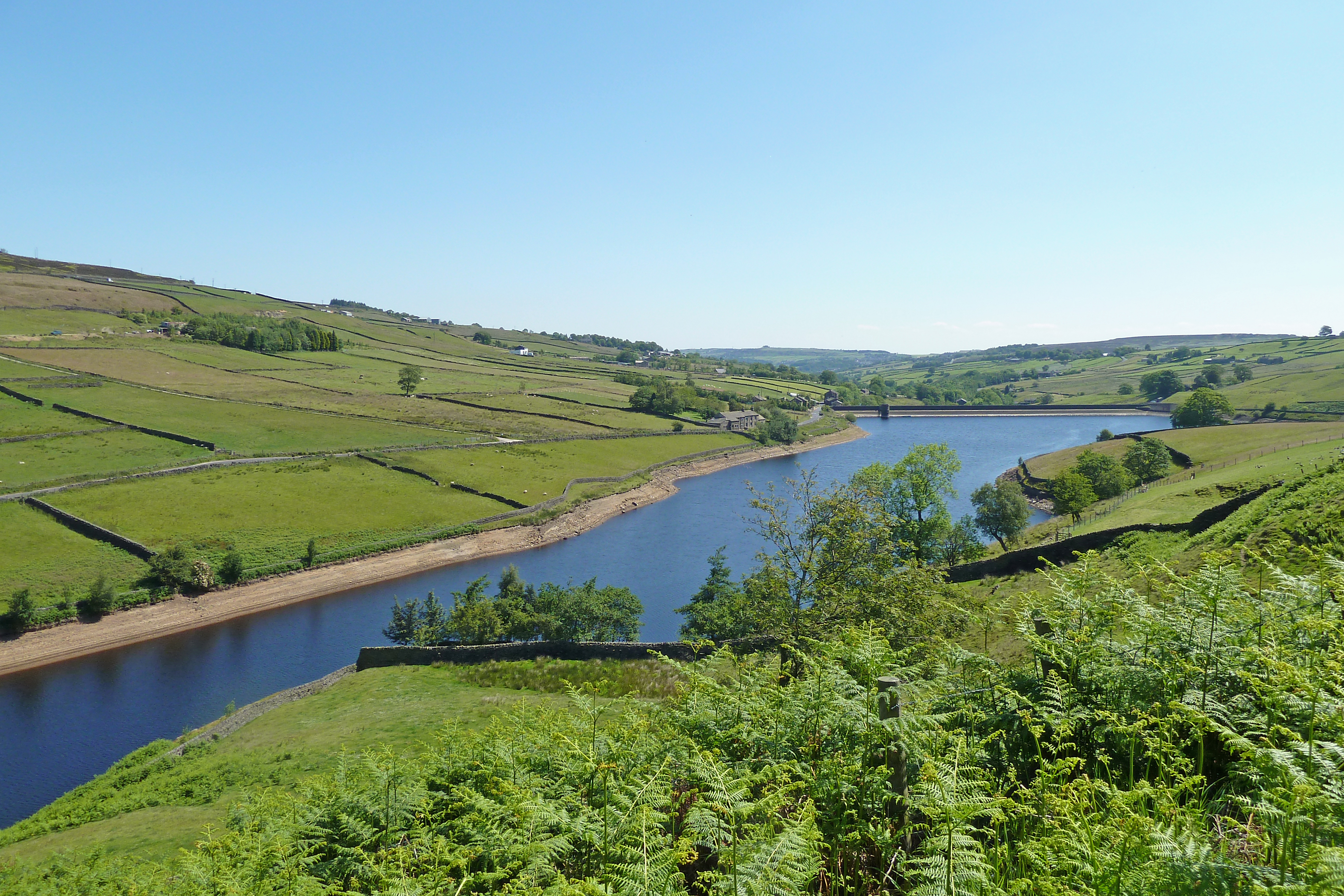
- Ponden Reservoir

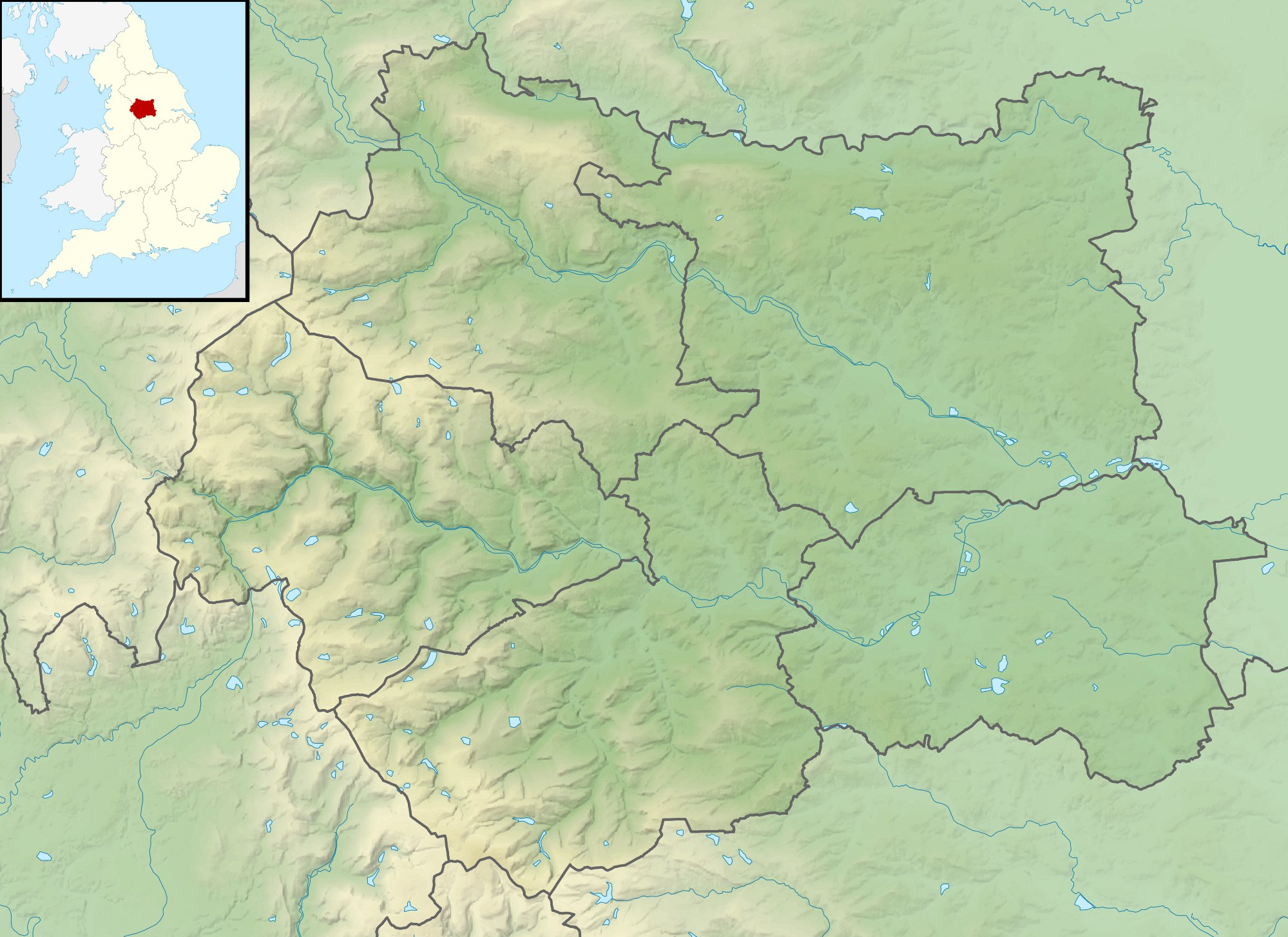
- Location within West Yorkshire
- Location: Stanbury, West Yorkshire, England
- Coordinates: 53.830°N 2.010°W
- Type: Compensation
- Primary outflows: River Worth
- Catchment area: 2,540 acres (1,027 ha)
- Built: 1871–1876
- Surface area: 25 acres (10 ha)
- Water volume: 30,500,000 cubic feet (865,000 m^{3})
- Shore length^{1}: 1.2 miles (2 km)
- Surface elevation: 768 feet (234 m)
- ^{1} Shore length is not a well-defined measure.

Ponden Reservoir is an artificial upland lake in the Worth Valley, near Stanbury, West Yorkshire, England. Ponden was built as a compensation reservoir after the nearby Watersheddles Reservoir (upstream) was used to divert water away from the River Worth. Ponden was needed to regulate the flow of water down the river into the downstream mills in the valley.

The reservoir is owned and managed by Yorkshire Water, and is used as a recreational waterbody by a sailing club.

== History ==
Ponden Reservoir was completed in 1876 as a compensation reservoir on the River Worth in West Yorkshire. An estimate in 1853 accounted for 16 mills between the site of Ponden Reservoir and where the River Worth ended in Keighley. The tender for construction of Ponden (and Watersheddles) was awarded to Walker and Taylor of Crewe in June 1870. But the construction was beset by problems with the puddle trench (needed for the dam wall), being sunk to a depth of 67 feet (20 m) before finding rock. Other issues with building the reservoir changed the original timeline from 1 year and nine months, to five years. By 1874, the height of the dam wall had been built to a height of 26 feet (7.9 m), and 222 men were working on the project.

The influx of navvies to construct both Watersheddles and Ponden reservoirs, created a separate local industry; brewing. It was said that the navvies needed two things; beef and beer, and a brewery was built to service their needs at Scar Top, which was at the north eastern end of the dam wall at Ponden Reservoir.

Keighley Corporation Waterworks operated the reservoir until 1959, when it was amalgamated into the newly created Craven Water Board (CWB). The CWB, itself, was subsumed into Yorkshire Water in 1974. In 2022, Yorkshire Water commissioned a 1.2 miles (1.9 km) pipeline to connect Walshaw Dean Upper Reservoir to Ponden Reservoir, which allows for the transfer of water to Ponden. During the 2022 drought, this enabled reservoir levels at Ponden to be increased from a 20% low, to 80%.

== Hydrology and wildlife ==
The Worth Valley reservoirs and their drinking water supply.

Water for Ponden Reservoir either flows downstream from Watersheddles reservoir, or through the streams that feed the reservoir separately. One of the major tributaries is Ponden Clough, which flows over sandstone beds, typically composed of grit, mudstone and Keighley Bluestone (a hard wearing stone used in road building locally). A catchment tower was built at the head of Ponden Clough which takes water away from the stream and straight into Watersheddles by the means of a conduit.

The water quality of Ponden is rated as moderate for ecological purposes, and good for its chemical composition, by the Environment Agency. The surrounding peatland contributes to the discolouration of the water held in the reservoir. Water from Ponden is now supplied to two water treatment works at Oldfield and Sladen Valley, as well as regulating the flow of water into the River Worth. Water from Ponden is only pumped to Oldfield WTW if the supply from Watersheddles is disrupted in any way.

The River Worth is noted for the presence of brook lamprey, which have been recorded just south of Ponden Bridge. In 2017-2018, a fish pass was installed into the reservoir. Canada geese are often seen on the reservoir, and reports of mink on the edges have been prevalent since the 1980s.

== Leisure ==
Ponden Water Sports Club use the site for canoeing, sailboarding and sailing.
