= North Beck =

Watercourse in West Yorkshire, England

North Beck Keighley Beck, Laycock Beck Morkin Beck, Dean Beck
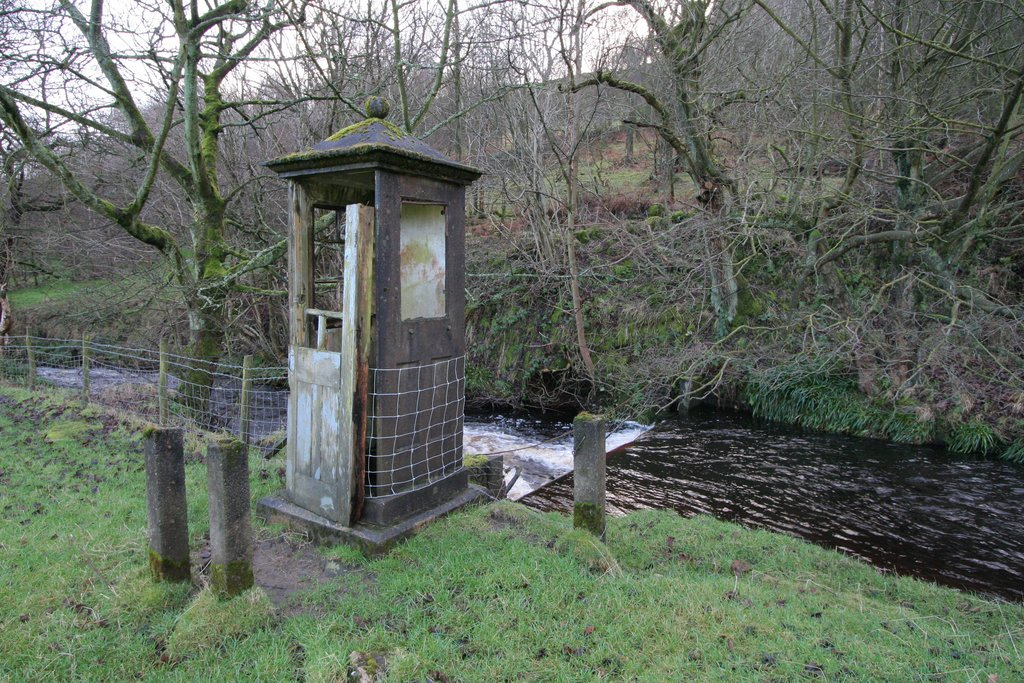
- Re-purposed K1 Telephone Box, Newsholme Dean

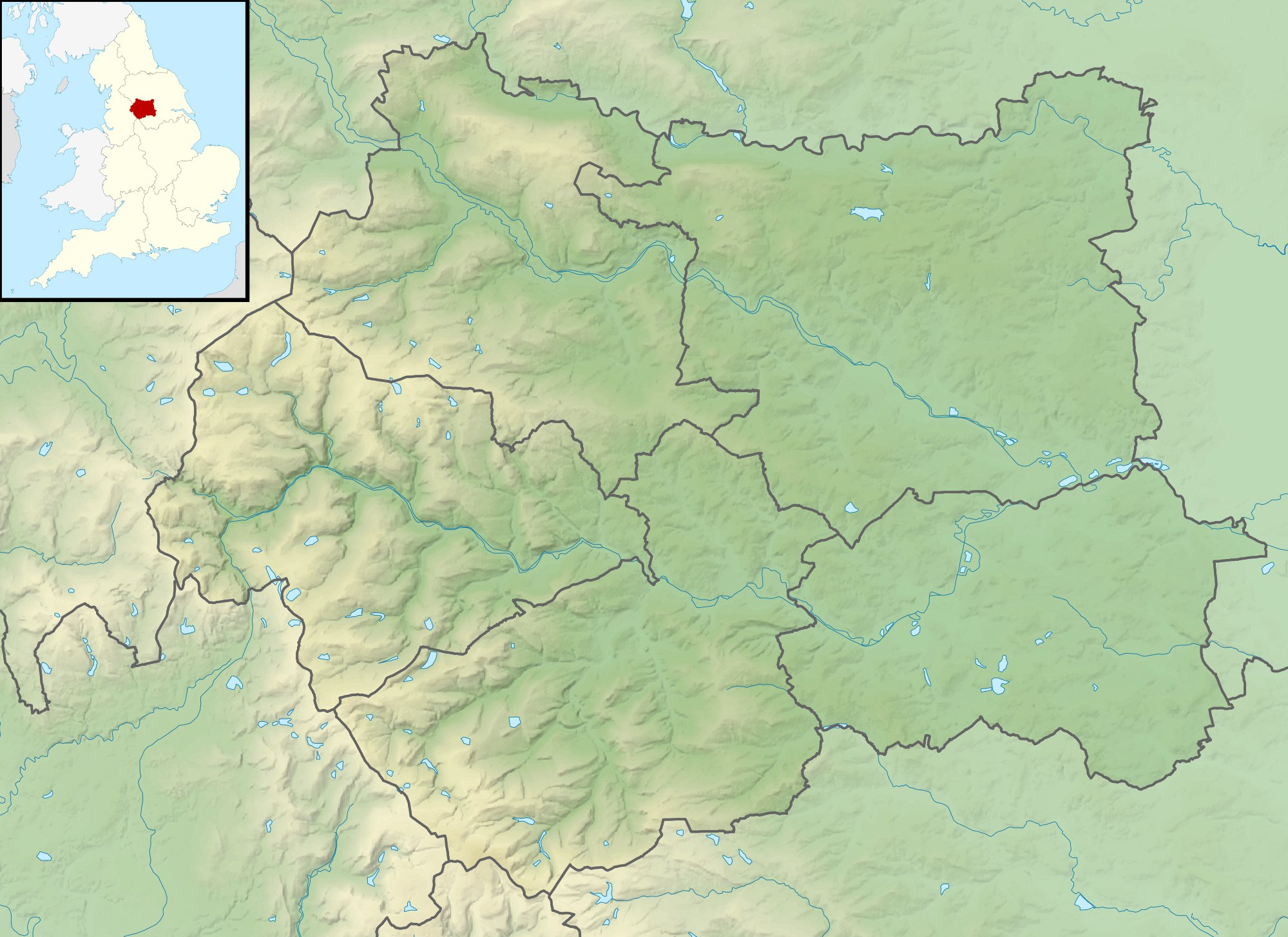
- Location within West Yorkshire

Location
- Country: England
- County: West Yorkshire
- Locale: Keighley

Physical characteristics
- Source
  - location: Keighley Moor Reservoir
  - coordinates: 53.8524°N 2.0190°W
  - elevation: 374 metres (1,227 ft)
- Mouth
  - location: Keighley
  - coordinates: 53.8631°N 1.9065°W
  - elevation: 140 metres (460 ft)
- Length: 9.4 kilometres (5.8 mi)

Basin features
- EA waterbody ID: GB104027064230

North Beck is a small watercourse that rises on Keighley Moor and flows eastwards into the River Worth at Keighley in West Yorkshire, England. The beck powered several watermills, with a reservoir being built at the western end to help maintain a flow of water during dry and drought conditions. The beck is known to have been polluted in its lower reaches, but the middle section, which flows through Newsholme Dean, is a known beauty spot.

== Course ==
North Beck is a major tributary of the River Worth in Keighley; it flows past Goose Eye, Laycock, and Braithwaite before entering Keighley itself. The watercourse travels over boulder clay, millstone grit and carboniferous limestone. Lower down the valley where it runs through Keighley, it flows over Addingham Edge Grit. During the last glaciation period, the valley of Newsholme Dean was a glacial lake with a height around 900 feet (270 m) which had an overflow south-eastwards through Dry Clough past the hamlet of Newsholme. The beck starts at an elevation of 374 metres (1,227 ft) at Keighley Moor Reservoir, and flows eastwards first as Morkin Beck, later becoming Dean Beck, Newsholme Dean Beck and finally North Beck. Although it has many names, the Environment Agency classify the watercourse as one long stream (named North Beck) from the reservoir to its mouth at the River Worth. The beck drains an area of 1,978 hectares (4,890 acres) and flows for a distance of 9.4 kilometres (5.8 mi).

It was first recorded in 1333 as Kitheburna and then as Kyghleybek in 1488; the first part is the same derivative as the name for Keighley - Cyhha, a personal name, and either burn or beck. It is unsure when the name was changed from Keighley Beck to North Beck; in 1871, an application to widen Corn Mill Bridge over "Keighley Beck" was made to the local authority. Mapping from the early 19th-century shows that it was called Laycock (or Laycocks) Beck until just after North Becks Mill; this name being derived from the hamlet of Laycock further up the valley. The old bridge which crosses the beck between where Butter Clough enters and where Holme Mill is, has had two names historically; Intake Bridge, the name of a farm to the north-east of the bridge, and Tinker's Bridge, a local name.

The beck was used to power several mills along its course, with one mill having a large millpond built (known locally as Teapot Dam) which needed water from Newsholme Beck as well as Dean Beck; however, Newsholme Beck entered the valley lower downstream than the millpond, so an aqueduct was built to divert water from Newsholme Beck into the dam. Where the North Beck enters the River Worth, and slightly upstream of the mouth of the beck, is where all the main industries were located in Keighley as they needed water to function.

The beck was known to be polluted in the 19th and early 20th centuries; some reports stated that the level of the beck had been raised by over 5 feet (1.5 m) by the amount of detritus put into the beck around the Keighley area. In the 1840s, one business owner was quoted as saying that ash from his works cost £50 per year to be taken away, but dumping it in North Beck was cheaper. The beck was known to be quite clear above Castle Mill, but downstream of there the beck was subjected to pollution from a slaughterhouse, a tannery, open sewers, and the ironworks. Some of the deliberate pollution incidents were lessened by the culverting of the beck on its way through the town, which was largely achieved in 1934 during the Westgate clearance scheme. A survey of the outfalls into the beck detected only mostly low pollution possibilities, and one medium risk location just south of Goose Eye. Additionally the beck has suffered from flooding; in November 1866, several of the mills along the beck were flooded out and a bridge was washed away. In 2002, several families were advised to leave their properties and several cars in the car park at Goose Eye Mill were left under 3 feet (0.91 m) of water.

The beck has a significant amount of built heritage attached to it, including the mills at Goose Eye (Rag Mill and Turkey Mill), two bridges at Goose Eye, an old telephone kiosk from the 1930s which was installed in Newsholme Dean to monitor water flow, and a clapper bridge and packhorse bridge in its western reaches.

== Reservoirs ==
The beck starts at Keighley Moor Reservoir which has been in existence since the 1830s, but another reservoir to be located at, and called, Newsholme Dean, was proposed along the beck during the 1960s. A flow gauge was installed at Newsholme Beck Weir in the 1960s, which was housed in an old 1920's telephone kiosk. The telephone kiosk is a Mk 235 and is now grade II listed as it only one of seven extant examples in the United Kingdom. The reservoir was proposed by the Craven Water Board, one of the precursors of Yorkshire Water, who also owned and operated Keighley Moor Reservoir at the time.

== Flora and fauna ==
The beck flows through two sections which are labelled as sites of geological and ecological importance; Newsholme Dean which covers 27.5 hectares (68 acres) and Holme House Woods, which covers 12.5 hectares (31 acres). Where North Beck flows through Newsholme Dean, the area has been described as almost untouched by humans, as the stream flows through the bottom of a u-shaped valley which has seen very little development. Holme House Wood was renamed Captain Tom’s Memorial Wood in 2021 in memory of Captain Tom Moore who was from Keighley. Whilst fish are known to be present within the beck, the 400 metres (1,300 ft) of culverting, steep walls, and straightened watercourse in its lowest reach where it meets the River Worth are barriers to fish migration.

== Industrial history ==
The beck suffered drought conditions in 1826 and some summers afterwards, so the mill owners along the stretch of water gathered together to build Keighley Moor Reservoir, to ensure a constant flow of water to power their mills. At least 14 mills were built along the course of the beck to take advantage of water power. Another three mills were also built on Newsholme Beck, a tributary of North Beck.

Water mills built upon North Beck - listed from west to east (upstream to downstream)
Mill name	Date built	Waterwheel size	Coords	Details	Ref
Rag Mill (Goose Eye Mill)	1797	30 feet 9 inches (9.37 m)	56.8612°N 1.9589°W	Cotton, paper; now a grade II listed building.	
Turkey Mill	1791	29 feet (8.8 m)	56.8617°N 1.9559°W	Paper mill; now a grade II listed building. Also listed as Brownend Mill	
Wood Mill	1795	21 feet (6.4 m)	53.8625°N 1.9511°W	Built in 1798 by a man named Shackleton. Listed as Worsted spinning.	
Holme Mill	1816	21 feet 4 inches (6.50 m)	53.8639°N 1.9309°W	Paper tube mill, originally worsted. Also listed as Intake Mill, and Higher Holme Mill.	
Lower Holme Mill	?	9 feet (2.7 m)	53.8645°N 1.9290°W	Listed as Holme Top Mill in the parliamentary minutes, but as Lower Holme Mill on mapping	
Castle Mill	1783	23 feet 3 inches (7.09 m)	53.8465°N 1.9227°W	Approved to be built in 1783 by George Cavendish.	
Damside Mill	1794	N/A	53.8644°N 1.9205°W	Built to process cotton, but was closed in the early 19th-century and converted into cottages.	
North Beck Mills	1782	24 feet (7.3 m)	53.8646°N 1.9177°W		
Springfield Mills	?	N/A	53.8646°N 1.9154°W		
Corn Mill (Keighley)	?	21 feet 6 inches (6.55 m)	53.8647°N 1.9113°W		
Hattersley's Mill (North Brook Mill)	?	3 feet 10 inches (1.17 m)	53.8642°N 1.9104°W	Iron works and machine mill.	
Cabbage Mill	1783	16 feet (4.9 m)	53.8635°N 1.9069°W	Listed as spinning worsted. This was built on what was called Cabbage Croft; it is now under the site of a supermarket.	

Other mill owners also paid into the scheme which could supply water further downstream, but their mills were not on North Beck, such as Low Mill, Dalton Mills (Strong Close Mill), and Stubbing House Mill, which were on the River Worth.
