= Airedale =

Valley in North and West Yorkshire, England

Coordinates: 53.8819°N 1.9048°W

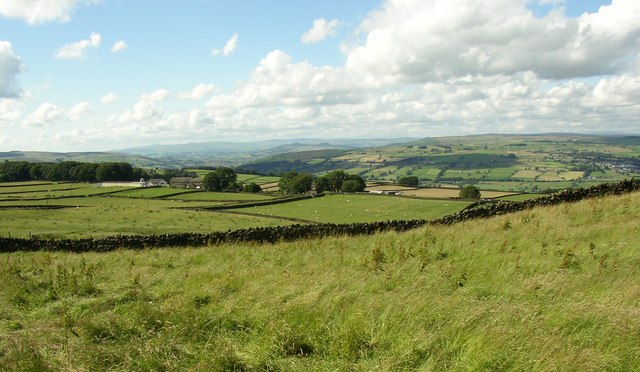
View of Airedale from near Keighley

Airedale is a valley, or dale, in North Yorkshire and West Yorkshire, England. It is named after the River Aire, which flows through it. The upper valley, from Malham Cove to Airton, is known as Malhamdale, named after the village of Malham. At Airton the valley widens and becomes Airedale proper. The river flows past Skipton on to Keighley, Bingley, Shipley, and Leeds.

Airedale, in conjunction with the Ribble Valley, provides low-altitude passes from Yorkshire to Lancashire through the Aire Gap. It is therefore an important transport route and was a strategically important area historically.

== History ==
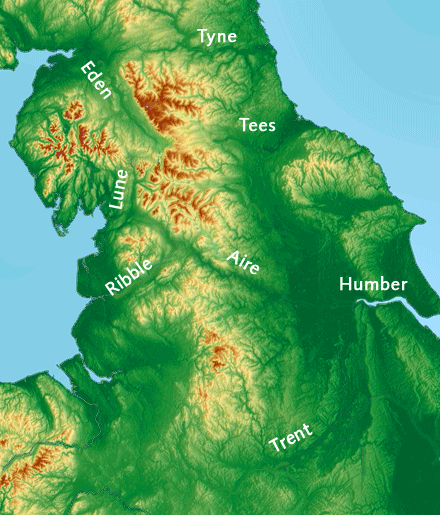
The central Pennines can be easily traversed by low passes: * Airedale to Ribblesdale 144 m (472 ft) near Barnoldswick. * Airedale to Pendle Water 165 m (541 ft) near Colne. * Airedale to Londsdale 166 m (545 ft) near Settle.

The upper Aire valley was formed 12,000 years ago by a retreating glacier. A moraine formed in the Cononley area and the lake stretched as far north as Gargrave. Colonisation by man developed later on, especially during the Iron Age. The peoples that occupied the Aire Valley (and much of north eastern England) were called Brigantes by the Romans.

Transport improved in the 18th and 19th centuries with the building of the Aire and Calder Navigation and the Leeds and Liverpool Canal. The railways arrived from the 1830s onwards and during the twentieth century the roads were vastly improved in the valley.

Airedale was wholly within the West Riding of Yorkshire until the reform of local government in 1974.

== Description ==
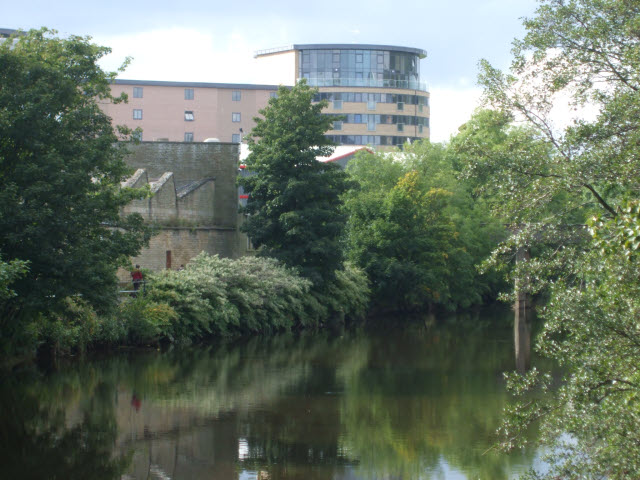
River Aire at Shipley

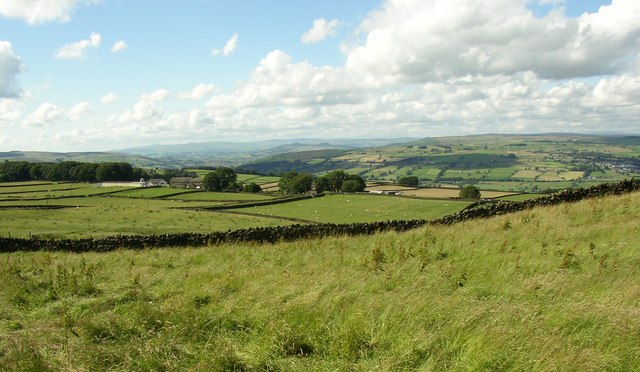
View of Airedale Looking towards north west towards the Malham Hills from Keighley

The upper valley is within the Yorkshire Dales and Yorkshire Dales National Park. From Aire Springs the river flows past Skipton and Keighley, through Bingley, Saltaire, Shipley and into Leeds. Until this point the river is essentially swift flowing and fed by streams and becks.

The broad definition of Airedale includes all the areas adjacent to the River Aire and its tributaries. The Aire Catchment Flood Management Plan (CFMP), which takes into account all the becks and streams that feed the river, lists the Worth Valley and most of Bradford City as part of Airedale. Similarly, the Airedale Partnership's Masterplan, which is sponsored by Bradford Council, shows the same boundaries as the Aire CFMP.

== Geology ==
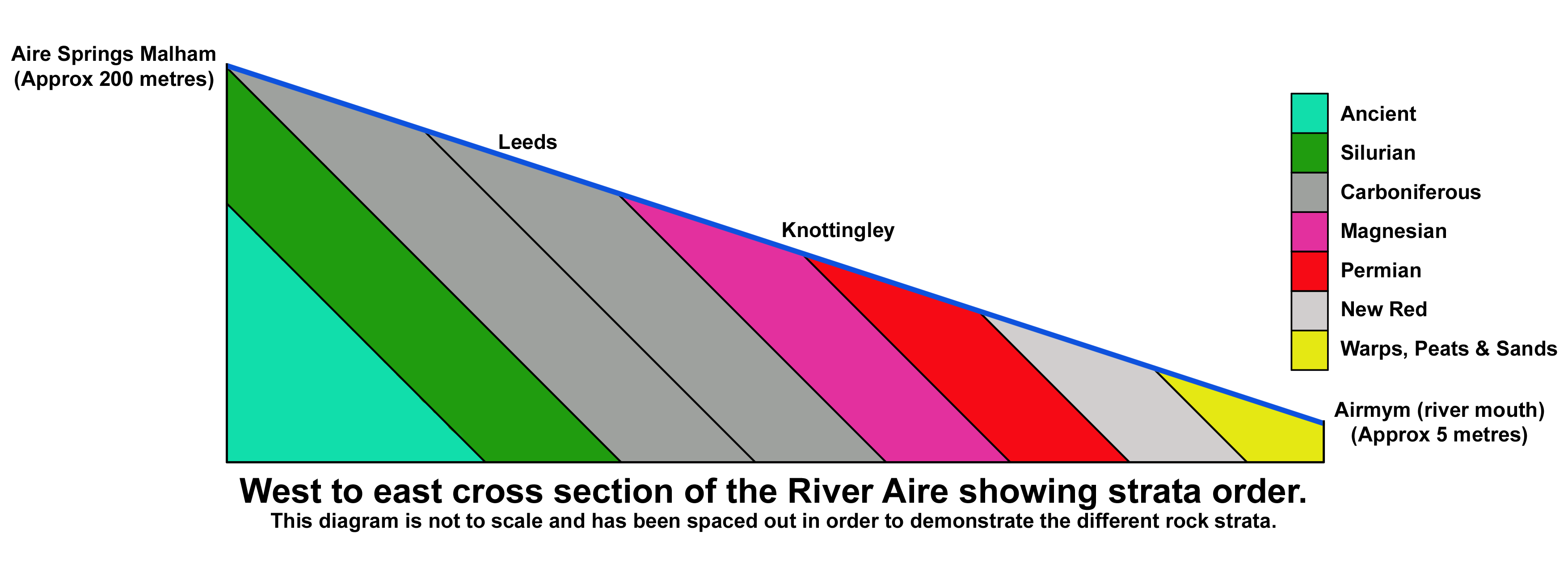
Strata order of Aire Valley geology

The upper section between Malham and Skipton is largely upfaulted Carboniferous limestone. The middle section between Skipton and Knottingley is peat and gritstone, with steep valley walls crested with moorland prevalent between Skipton and Shipley. The sandstone deposits between Skipton and Leeds have characterised the buildings within this part of Airedale, whilst the deposits of Limestone, Coal, Fireclay and Ironstone fuelled industrial developments.

== Tourism ==
Airedale is notable for several tourist sites and the World Heritage Site of Saltaire village. Other attractions include the Keighley and Worth Valley Railway, Bingley Five Rise Locks, the Shipley Glen Tramway, East Riddlesden Hall, Rodley Nature Reserve, Kirkstall Abbey, the Royal Armouries (Leeds), St Aidan's Nature Reserve and Fairburn Ings Nature Reserve.

== Industry ==
Many of the former woollen and cotton mills of the dale have been demolished or converted into housing. The heavy industry east of Leeds is still in existence and two of the three coal fired powers stations in the lower section take their water from the River Aire. Industry that lies alongside the Aire includes Ferrybridge, Eggborough and Drax power stations, Eggborough Saint Gobain glassworks, Stolze and Allied Glass in Knottingley and Kellingley Colliery.

Leeds City Council have an enterprise zone that covers 400 acres of regenerated land along the Aire Valley from the city centre up to junction 45 of the M1 (known as Gateway 45). This houses several manufacturing and food companies.

== Eponyms ==
The names Aire and Airedale are associated with many things and areas. Most notable in the valley are Airedale General Hospital, Aireborough (a region comprising mostly Wharfedale towns) and Airedale, a suburb of Castleford.

The area gives its name to the Airedale Terrier, the largest of the terrier group of dogs. They were first bred in the area in the nineteenth century.
