= River Worth =

River in West Yorkshire, England

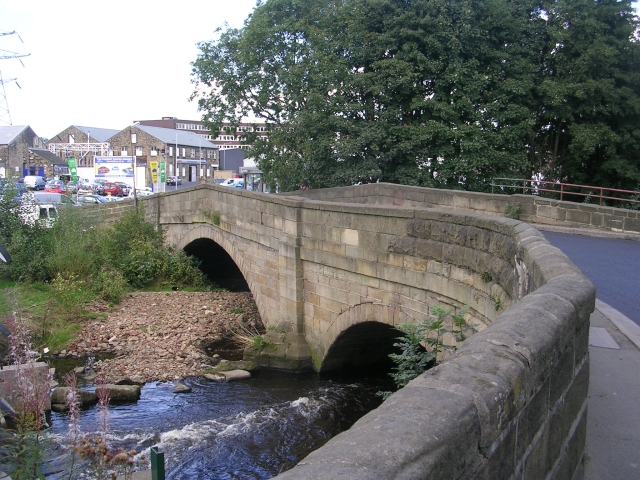
- Bridge over River Worth – Coney Lane, Keighley

Location
- Country: England

Physical characteristics
- Source
  - location: Watersheddles Reservoir, Lancashire
  - coordinates: 53°50′17″N 2°2′49″W
  - elevation: 329 metres (1,079 ft)
- Mouth
  - location: River Aire, Keighley
  - coordinates: 53°52′31″N 1°53′7″W
  - elevation: 88 metres (289 ft)
- Length: 15.2 km (9.4 mi)
- Basin size: 87.3 km^{2} (33.7 sq mi)

The River Worth is a river in West Yorkshire, England. It flows from minor tributaries on the moors above Watersheddles Reservoir down the Worth Valley to Haworth, where it is joined by Bridgehouse Beck which flows from Oxenhope. The River Worth is itself a tributary of the River Aire, which it joins at the end of the Worth Valley in Keighley.

== Course ==
There are many small streams that feed Watersheddles Reservoir (yards over the border in Lancashire) from which the River Worth is fed. From the reservoir, the river flows east into Ponden Reservoir into the town of Haworth where it is joined by Bridgehouse Beck. It then flows east north-east through the suburbs of Keighley into the town centre where North Beck flows into it, it then continues down towards Stockbridge where it joins the River Aire. The typical river level range where it joins the River Aire is between 9 inches (0.22 m) and 3 feet 3 inches (1 m).

== Natural history ==
The river was once very polluted, but the lack of local industry nowadays has seen the river become much cleaner and it supports many forms of wildlife throughout its course. Herons, kingfishers and dippers are now a common sight. The river currently has a population of small brown trout and grayling, but they are restricted to certain parts by a number of high weirs left behind from its industrial past.

== History ==
The river provided power for the wool and clothing mills. Woollen and worsted manufacture was introduced here with the first cotton-mill in Yorkshire, Low Mill at Keighley, erected in 1780.

== Leisure ==
The river valley is home to the Keighley & Worth Valley Railway. Bradford City Council have marked out a short/middle (circular) distance walk along the valley called The Worth Way. Angling is also allowed by permit at certain places along the river.

== Lists ==
=== Tributaries ===
- Little Spring Dike
- Dean Clough
- Whitestone Clough
- Ponden Clough Beck
- Lumb Beck
- Lower Pitcher Clough
- Sladen Beck
- Bridgehouse Beck
- North Beck

=== Settlements ===
- Stanbury
- Oldfield
- Haworth
- Oakworth
- Damems
- Keighley

=== Crossings ===
- Unnamed road, Silver Hill Bank
- Unnamed road, Old Snap Bottoms
- Old Lane, Old House
- Ponden Lane, Scar Top
- Ponden Bridge
- Lumbfoot Road, Lumb Foot
- Lord Bridge, Mytholmes
- Spring Head Road, Mytholmes
- Victoria Avenue, Mytholmes
- Mytholmes Lane, Oakworth
- Unnamed road, Damems
- Keighley & Worth Valley Railway
- A629, Keighley
- Woodhouse Road, Keighley
- Coney Lane, Keighley
- Gresley Road, Keighley
- Low Mill Lane, Keighley
- Main Line Railway
- Dalton Lane, Keighley
- A650 (Aire Valley Road), Keighley
- Aireworth Road, Keighley

== Gallery ==
River Worth Images
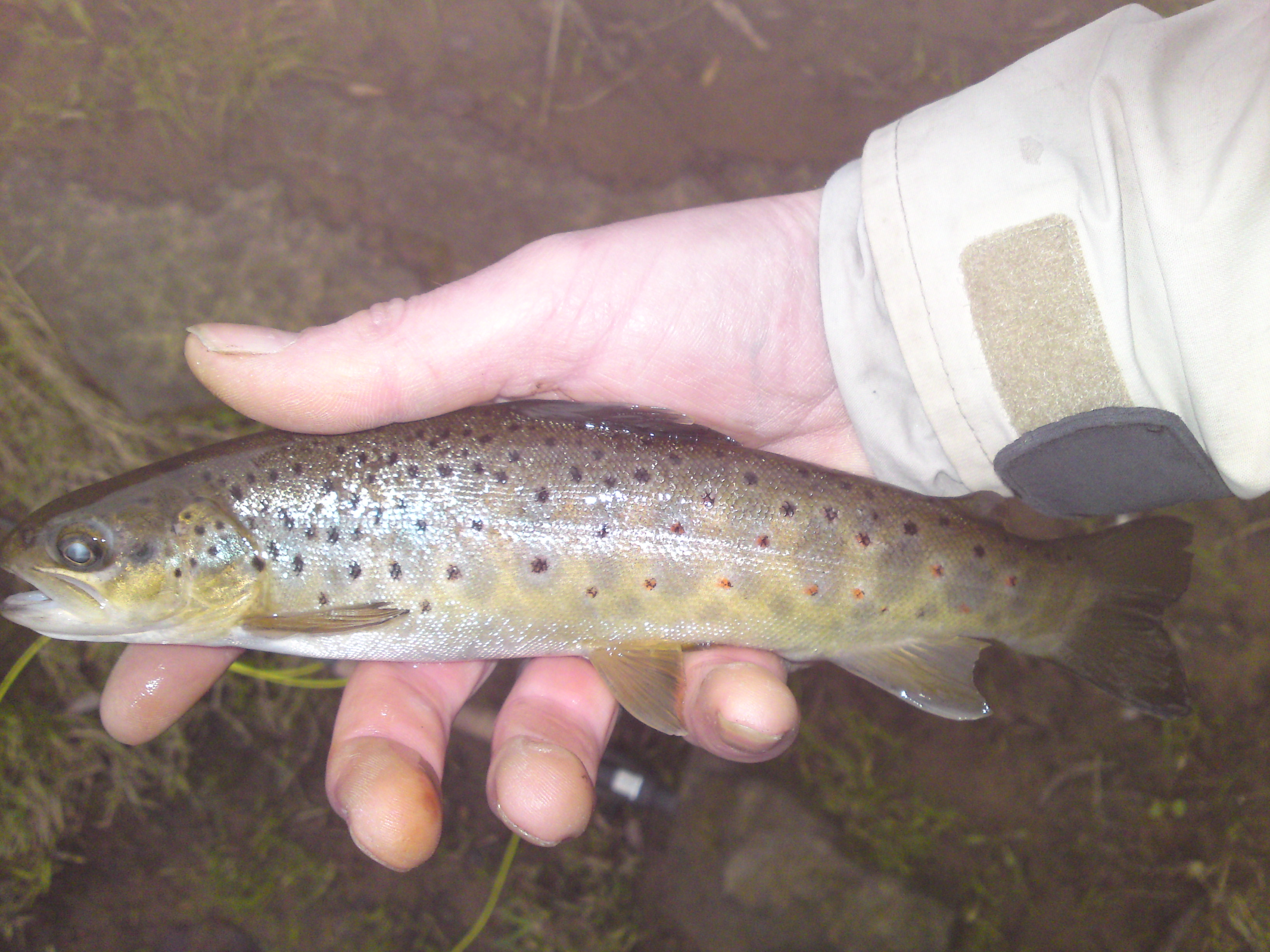
Small brown trout from the River Worth

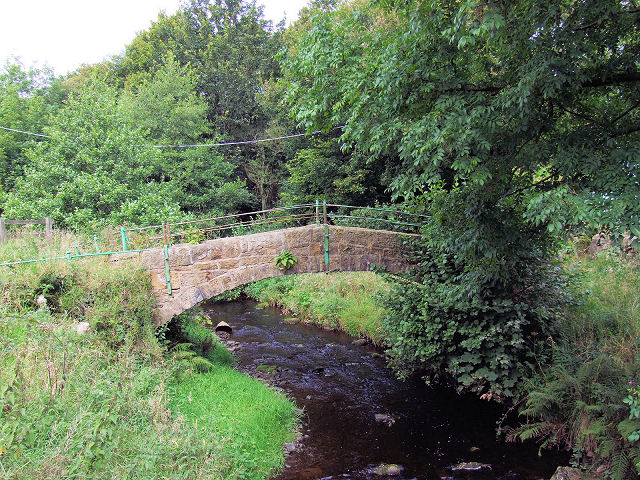
Footbridge over the River Worth near Lumbfoot

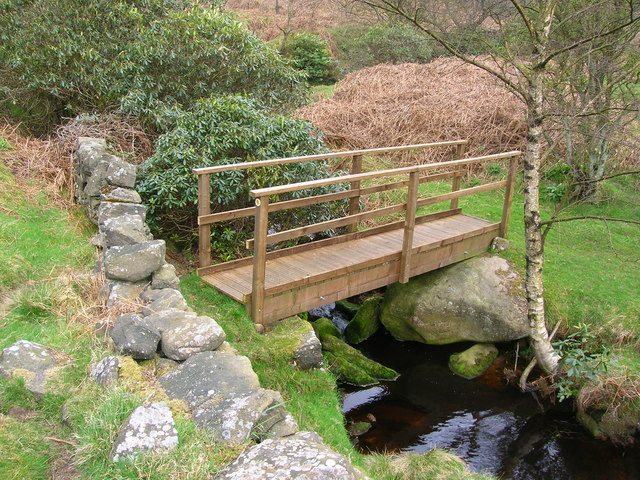
Bronte Way footbridge over the infant River Worth

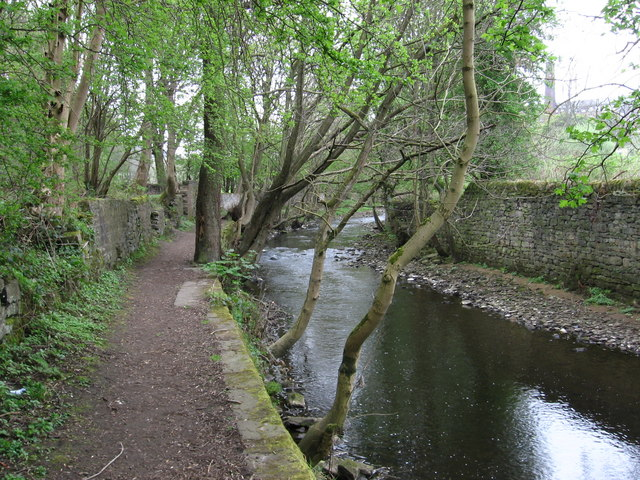
Keighley - footpath alongside River Worth

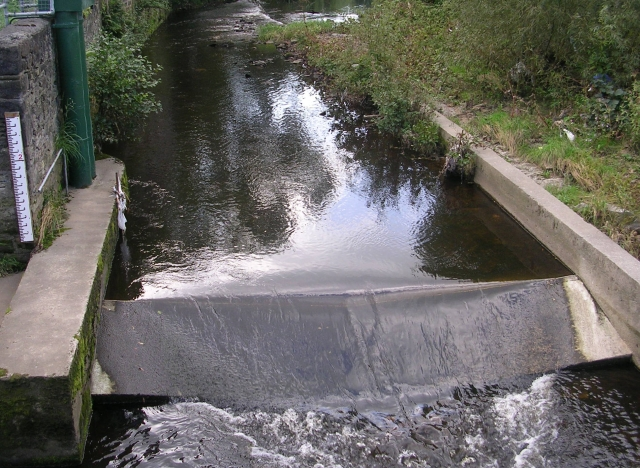
River Worth - Coney Lane, Keighley

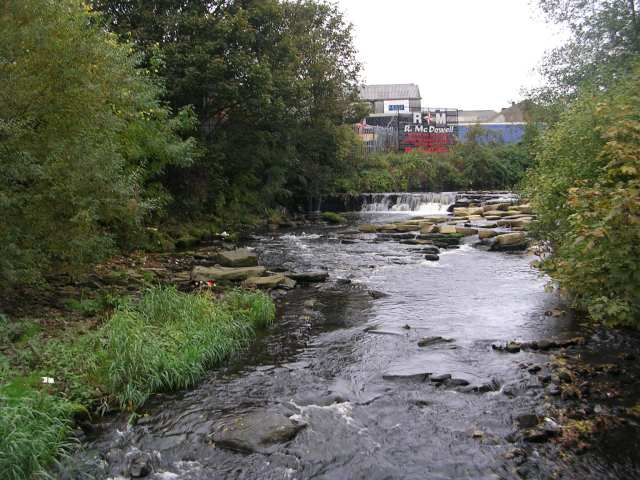
River Worth and Weir

== Sources ==
Ordnance Survey Open Data https://www.ordnancesurvey.co.uk/business-government/tools-support/open-data-support
