= Oldfield, West Yorkshire =

Hamlet in West Yorkshire, England

Coordinates: 53.837°N 1.992°W

Oldfield
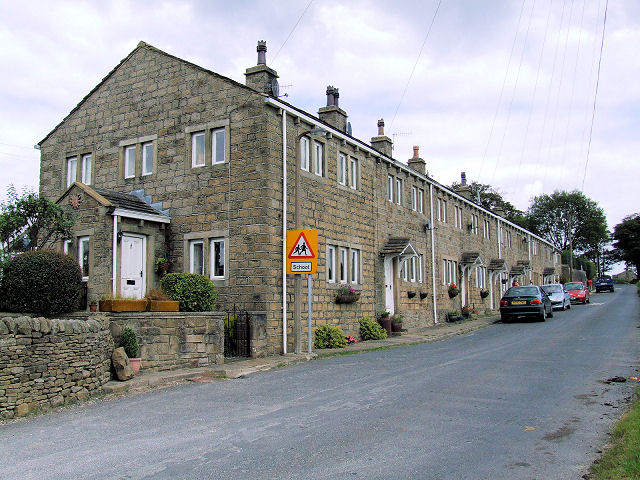
- Houses along Oldfield Lane

- Location within West Yorkshire
- OS grid reference: SE005378
- Civil parish: Keighley
- Metropolitan borough: City of Bradford
- Metropolitan county: West Yorkshire
- Region: Yorkshire and the Humber
- Country: England
- Sovereign state: United Kingdom
- Post town: KEIGHLEY
- Postcode district: BD22
- Dialling code: 01535
- Police: West Yorkshire
- Fire: West Yorkshire
- Ambulance: Yorkshire
- UK Parliament: Keighley and Ilkley

Oldfield is a hamlet in the civil parish of Keighley, in the Bradford district, in the county of West Yorkshire, England, situated north of Stanbury and near to Oakworth. It is approximately 4.6 miles (7.4 km) west of the town of Keighley. It mainly consists of farmland and has panoramic views across the Worth Valley towards Brontë Country. Top Withens, the house featured in the novel Wuthering Heights, is clearly visible.

There are no shops in Oldfield; however, there is a successful primary school for children aged 3 to 11. It is the district's smallest primary school. It is part of the Brontë Academy Trust, which also includes Haworth, Oakworth, and Lees primaries. Oldfield has a population of over 100. The local public house is The Grouse Inn, although there is The Friendly, Wuthering Heights and The Old Silent in Stanbury, a short walk across the valley.

Margaret Wintringham (née Longbottom), 4 August 1879 – 10 March 1955, who was a British Liberal Party politician, was born at Oldfield, where her father was the local schoolteacher. She was the second woman, and the first British-born woman, to take her seat in the House of Commons of the United Kingdom. As Member of Parliament for Louth, Lincolnshire, she was in office from 22 September 1921 until 28 October 1924. A blue plaque was unveiled to honour her on the side of the school building in April 2021.

== See also ==
- Listed buildings in Keighley
- Haworth
