= Brontë Country =

Area of south Pennine hills in West Yorkshire, England

Coordinates: 53.830°N 1.954°W

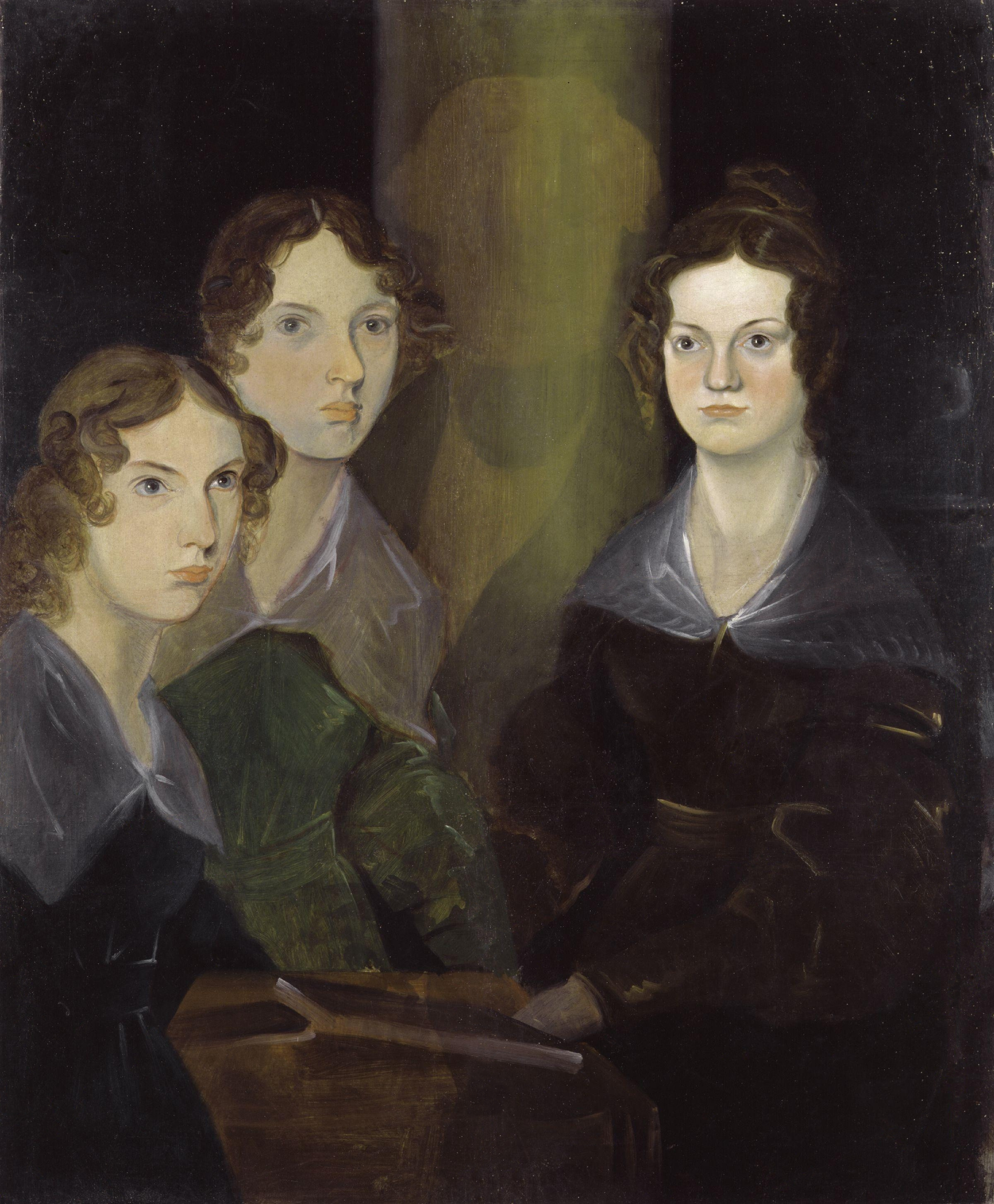
The Brontë sisters, painted by their brother, Branwell c. 1834.

Brontë Country is a name given to an area of south Pennine hills west of Bradford in West Yorkshire, England. The name comes from the Brontë sisters, who wrote such literary classics as Jane Eyre (Charlotte Brontë), Wuthering Heights (Emily Brontë), and The Tenant of Wildfell Hall (Anne Brontë) while living in the area.

== Geology ==
The geology of the Brontë country is mainly gritstone.

== Points of interest ==
The area includes the village of Haworth, where the Brontë sisters lived, and where the Brontë Parsonage Museum is located today. Top Withens is said to have been the inspiration for Wuthering Heights. Ponden Hall, which located about half a mile outside Stanbury, is believed to inspire at least two buildings in Brontës' novels: Thrushcross Grange in Wuthering Heights and the eponymous mansion in The Tenant of Wildfell Hall. Thornton, on the outskirts of Bradford, is the birthplace of the Brontë sisters and their brother Branwell (their father was rector of Thornton church). The house where they were born still exists as the Brontë Birthplace and in November 2023 was acquired for restoration and preservation as a cultural and educational space. It is located on Market Street in the centre of the village.

Other places of interest from the Brontë sisters' novels include Oakwell Hall (Fieldhead in Shirley), Red House (Briarmains in Shirley), and Gawthorpe Hall and Wycoller Hall (Ferndean Manor in Jane Eyre).

== In media and culture ==
The film Brontë Country: The Story of the Emily, Charlotte & Anne Brontë discusses the area's geography and history, and the history of the Brontë family.

== Gallery ==
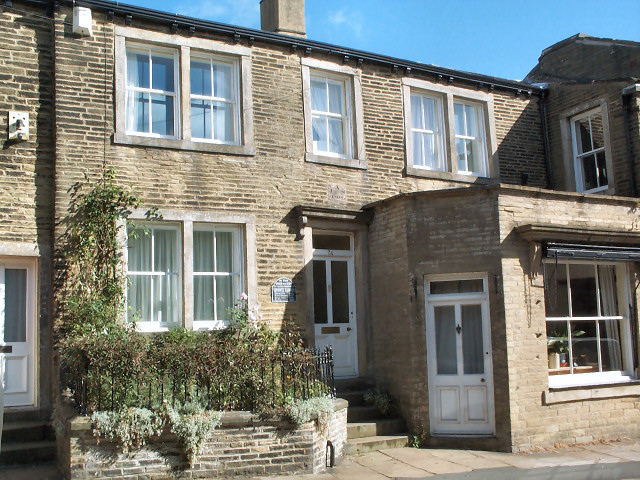
The birthplace of the Brontë brothers and sisters in Market Street, Thornton Village

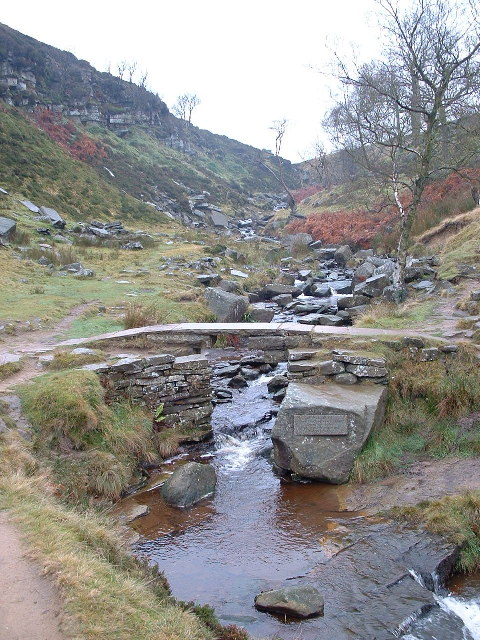
Bronte bridge

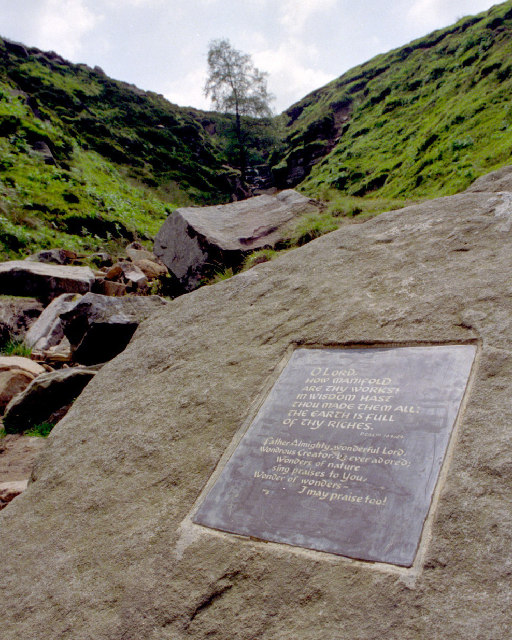
Plaque at Bronte waterfall

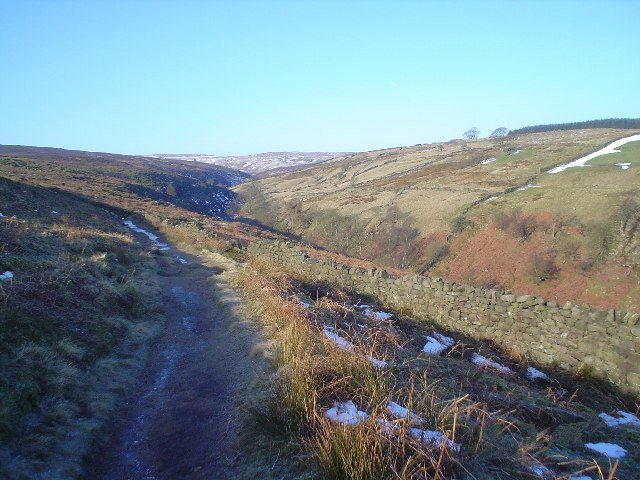
The Bronte Way, looking SW towards Bronte Bridge

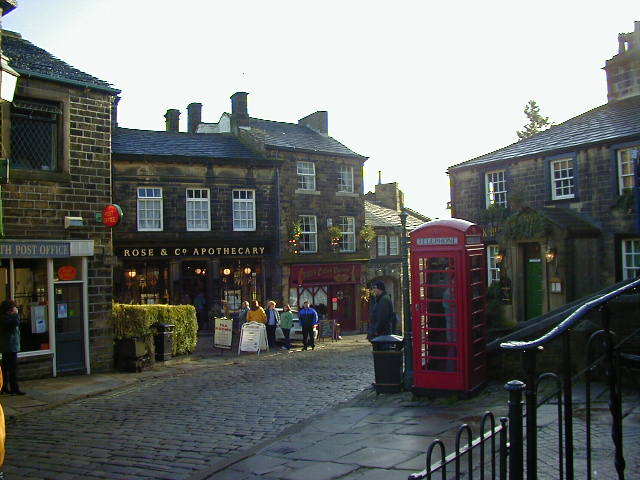
Haworth

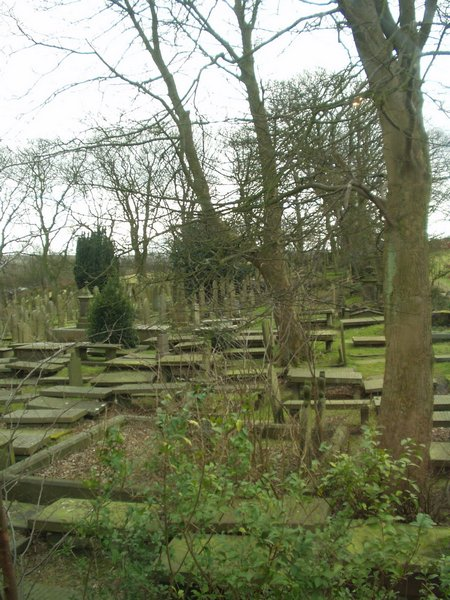
Haworth Churchyard

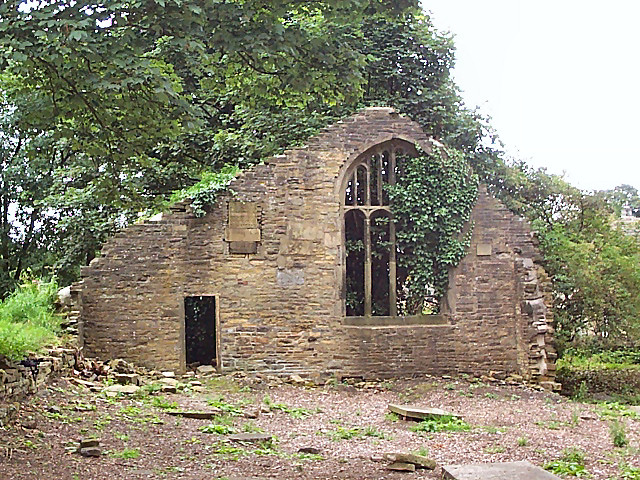
Chancel east wall of the ruin of St James' chapel, Thornton, West Yorkshire

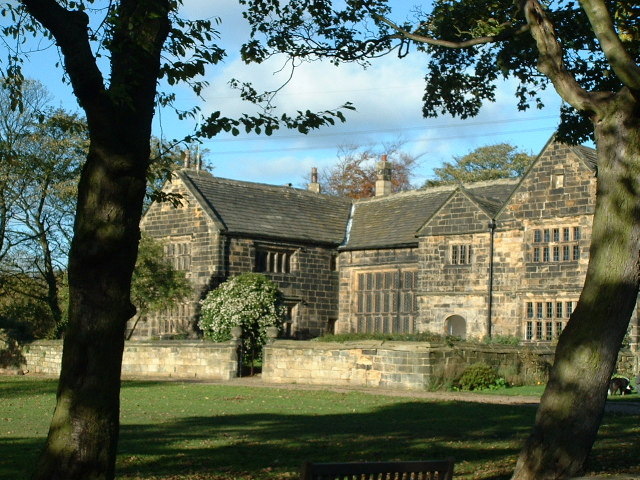
Oakwell Hall

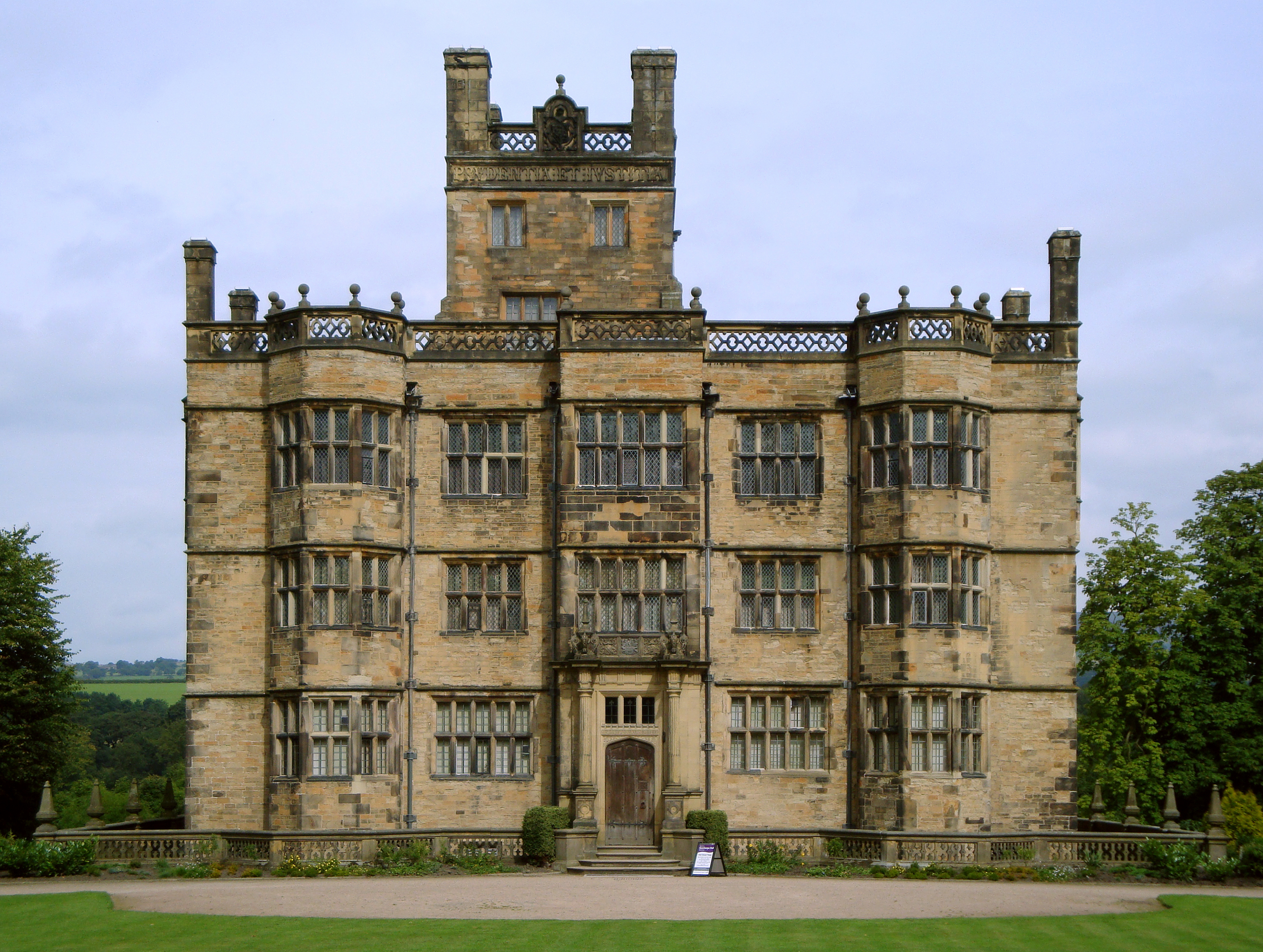
Gawthorpe hall, Padiham seen from the south east

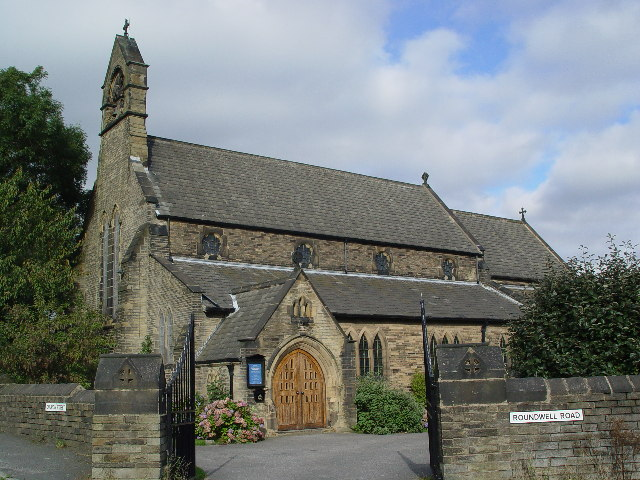
St Barnabas' parish church, Hightown, Liversedge, West Yorkshire

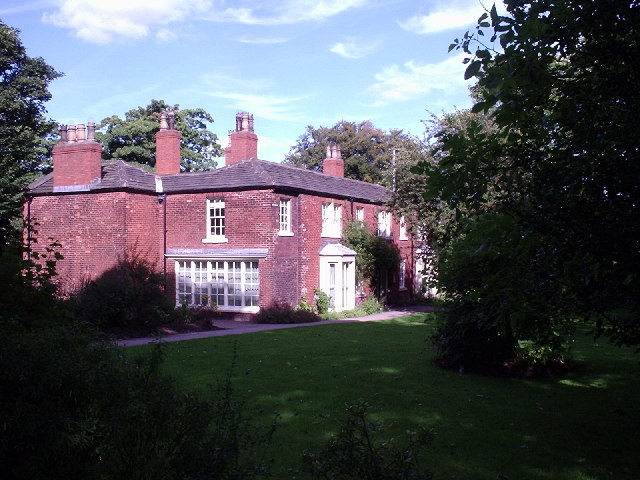
Red House Museum, Gomersal, often visited by Charlotte Brontë who featured the house as "Briarmains" in "Shirley"

== See also ==
- Bingley
- Bradford
- Brontë Waterfall
- Halifax, West Yorkshire
- High Sunderland Hall
- Keighley
- Leeds
- Lumbfoot
- Oakworth
- Saltaire
- Shibden Hall
- Shipley, West Yorkshire
- Skipton
- Stanbury
- Thornton, West Yorkshire
