= Lower Laithe Reservoir =

Reservoir in West Yorkshire, England

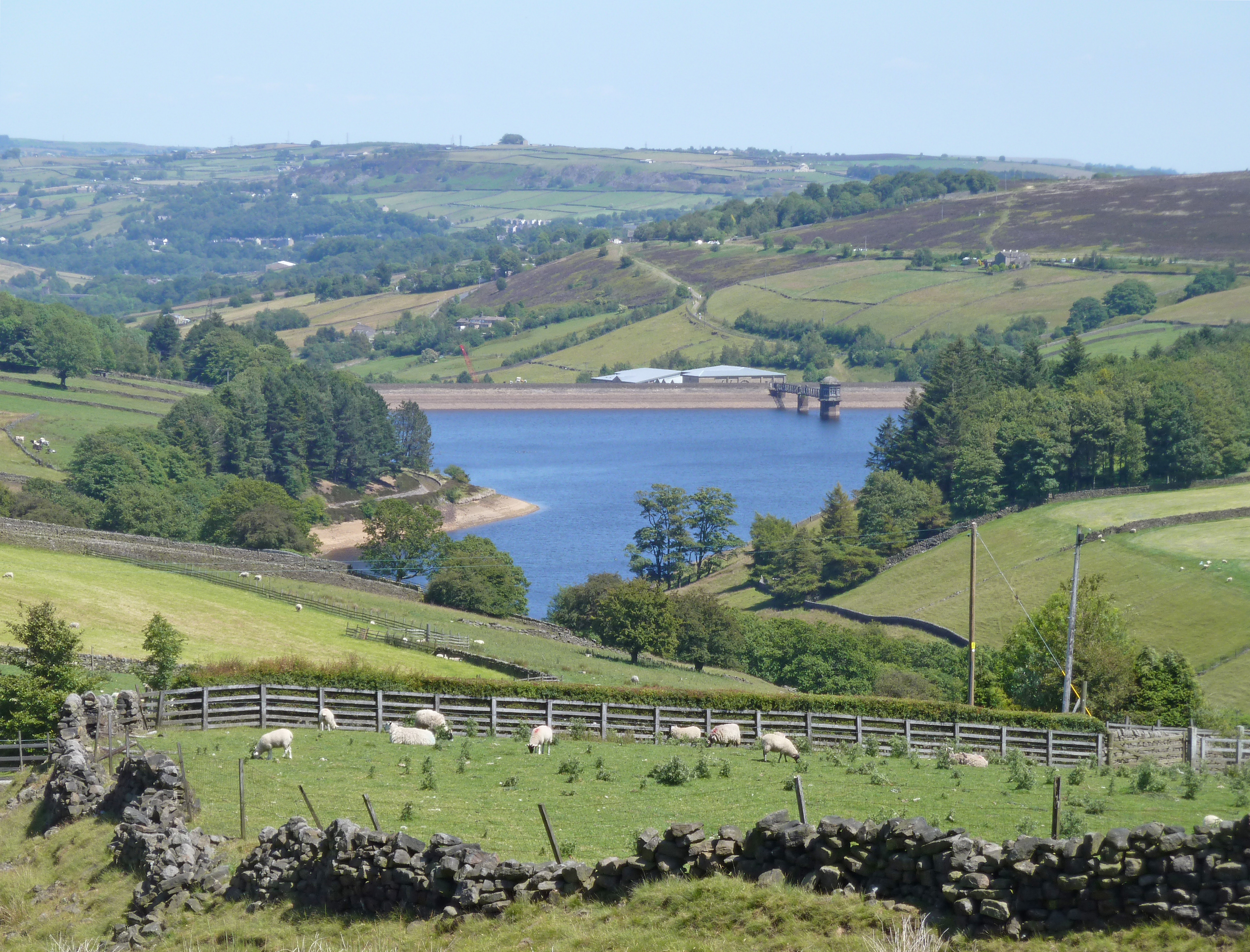
- Lower Laithe Reservoir looking eastwards towards the Worth Valley

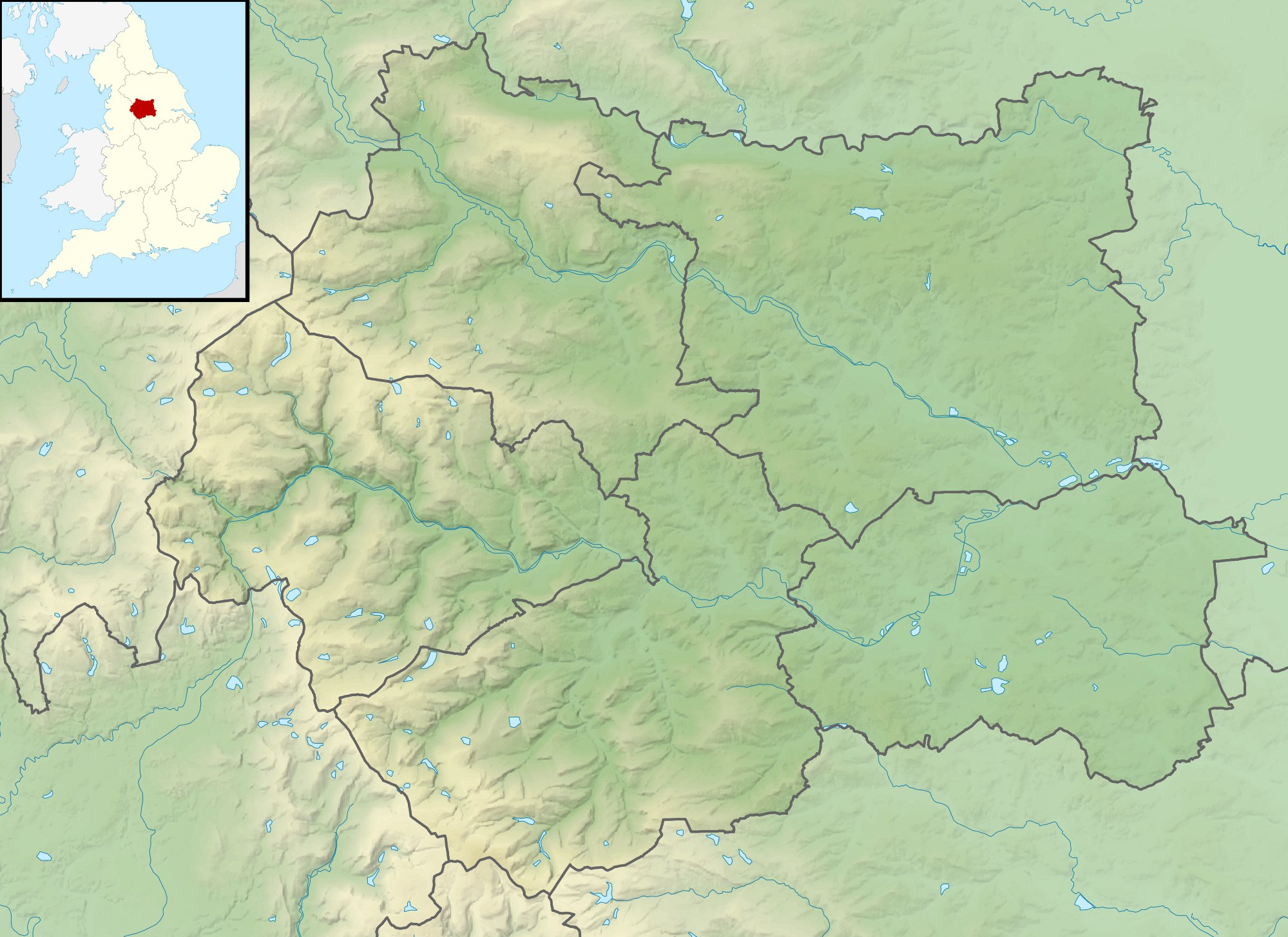
- Location within West Yorkshire
- Location: Stanbury, Haworth, West Yorkshire
- Coordinates: 53°49′40.8″N 1°58′46.6″W
- Type: Reservoir
- Primary inflows: Sladen Beck
- Primary outflows: Sladen beck
- Catchment area: 1,200 acres (500 ha)
- Basin countries: England
- Managing agency: Yorkshire Water
- Surface area: 29 acres (11.6 ha)
- Max. depth: 60 feet (18 m)
- Water volume: 45,000,000 cubic feet (1,275,000 m^{3})
- Shore length^{1}: 1.3 miles (2.1 km)
- Surface elevation: 735 feet (224 m)
- ^{1} Shore length is not a well-defined measure.

Lower Laithe Reservoir is a man-made upland reservoir that lies 1.2 miles (2 km) west of Haworth, West Yorkshire, England. The reservoir was initially approved under the Keighley Waterworks Extension and Improvement Act 1869 (32 & 33 Vict. c. cxxix). but work did not begin on its construction until 1911 and even then was delayed because of the First World War. The reservoir was officially opened in August 1925 in front of a crowd of over 8,000 people. Its final tally on cost was £500,000. The reservoir lies in the Sladen Valley and was often referred to as Sladen Valley Reservoir.

The reservoir, alongside other nearby man-made bodies of water, was proposed to afford a better water supply to the town of Keighley and its environs.

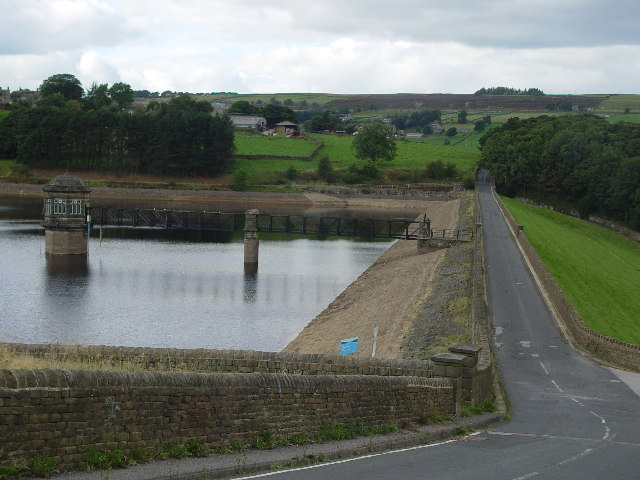
Lower Laithe Reservoir. The octagonal valve tower has five storeys of drawing mechanisms beneath it. This is looking northwards towards Stanbury across the dam head.

The reservoir dams Sladen Beck watercourse and takes water directly from the surrounding moorland including the stream that flows over the Bronte Waterfall. The catchment area is 1,200 acres (500 ha) and the Sladen Valley and Beck are part of the larger catchment of the River Worth and ultimately the River Aire.

The reservoir has an embankment as the dam head which is straight and extends to a length of 1,010 feet (310 m), a height of 84.5 feet (25.8 m) and which also supports a road between Oxenhope and Stanbury village. The road (since known as Waterhead Lane) used to cut across Sladen valley taking a north west route from Intake Farm and going through the small hamlet of Smith Bank. The hamlet and its mill (which featured in Halliwell Sutcliffe's novel A Man of the Moors) were flooded when the reservoir was completed with the road being diverted northwards onto the dam head. The dam head is concrete with a clay puddle core. There is a spillway at the northern end which drops down to the adjoining waterworks facility.

Stone for the reservoir was sourced from the nearby Dimples Quarry (now abandoned and in the Penistone Hill Country Park) which was 0.31 miles (0.5 km) south east of the reservoir. A narrow gauge railway was used to transfer the quarried product to the dam head which was operated by a rope worked incline. Clay for the central core was worked from a quarry 2 miles (3.2 km) west of Stanbury and necessitated laying a steam worked railway to bring the clay to the dam head.

The spillway and embankment were modernized and improved as part of a £60 million programme of investment by Yorkshire Water. Lower Laithe specifically was found to not have been up to standards as laid down by an act of parliament in 1978. The water classification is listed as moderate in terms of ecology and good in terms of chemical quality as of 2015. Whilst the surrounding moorland is noted for its bird life, few birds live on the reservoir itself although some like the shelduck are frequent visitors.

Sladen Beck joins the River Worth 0.62 miles (1 km) further east near to the hamlet of Lumb Foot.

The grassed east facing slope of the dam head was used as a backdrop for a banner promoting the Tour de Yorkshire. The banner was unveiled in January 2014 as part of a wider 'Yorkshire Festival' by the owners of the reservoir and one of the sponsors of the festival, Yorkshire Water.
