= Robert Shaw (poet) =

British poet, born 1933

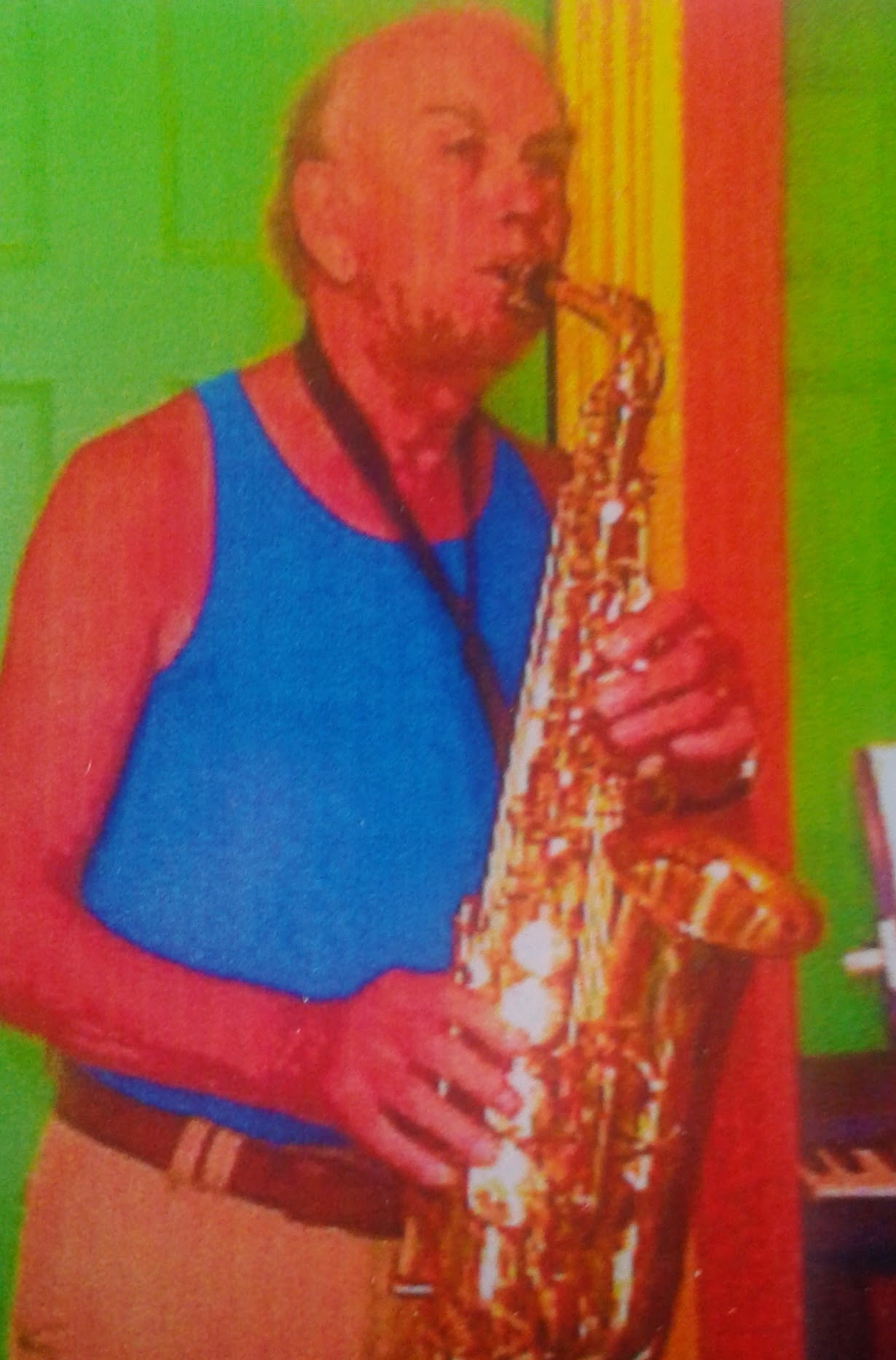
- Shaw in 2001

Background information
- Born: Robert John Shaw; 31 July 1933 (age 92); Coventry, England
- Origin: Leeds
- Education: University of Leeds
- Genres: Jazz
- Occupations: Poet, musician
- Instrument: Saxophone
- Spouse: Anne Shaw

Robert John Shaw (born 31 July 1933) is a British poet and pioneer of poetry and jazz fusion.

== Life ==
Born in Coventry, he grew up in Wyken, where his father was a machine-setter at Morris Motors. He was educated at King Henry VIII School.

Shaw trained as a reporter on The Coventry Standard, under the painstakingly prosaic editorship of former BBC correspondent Edgar Letts, who, troubled by Shaw's copy, often was to be heard enquiring of the chief reporter, "Do you think this can be possibly true?".

Shaw went on to gain an honours degree in arts (with first-class honours in English Literature) at The University of Leeds, supplementing his grant with work as a correspondent for the Manchester office of Melody Maker and as a freelance for the Yorkshire Evening Post.

Shaw's two years as a conscript in the Army included periods at the Joint Services School for Linguists run by the Services' Intelligence arm, and, briefly, the Royal Military Academy Sandhurst.

For some years, he then taught English in schools and in adult education for the Workers' Educational Association. From 1964 to 1968, he combined being Head of English and Sixth Form at the Leeds Modern School, with a part-time Tutorship at Leeds University and a Visiting Fellowship at The University of York.

From 1968 to 1972, he was Lecturer at The University of Southampton. In 1972, he became a freelance, returning to Yorkshire, to the Pennine village of Haworth where his wife, the studio-potter Anne Shaw, had set up Haworth Pottery.

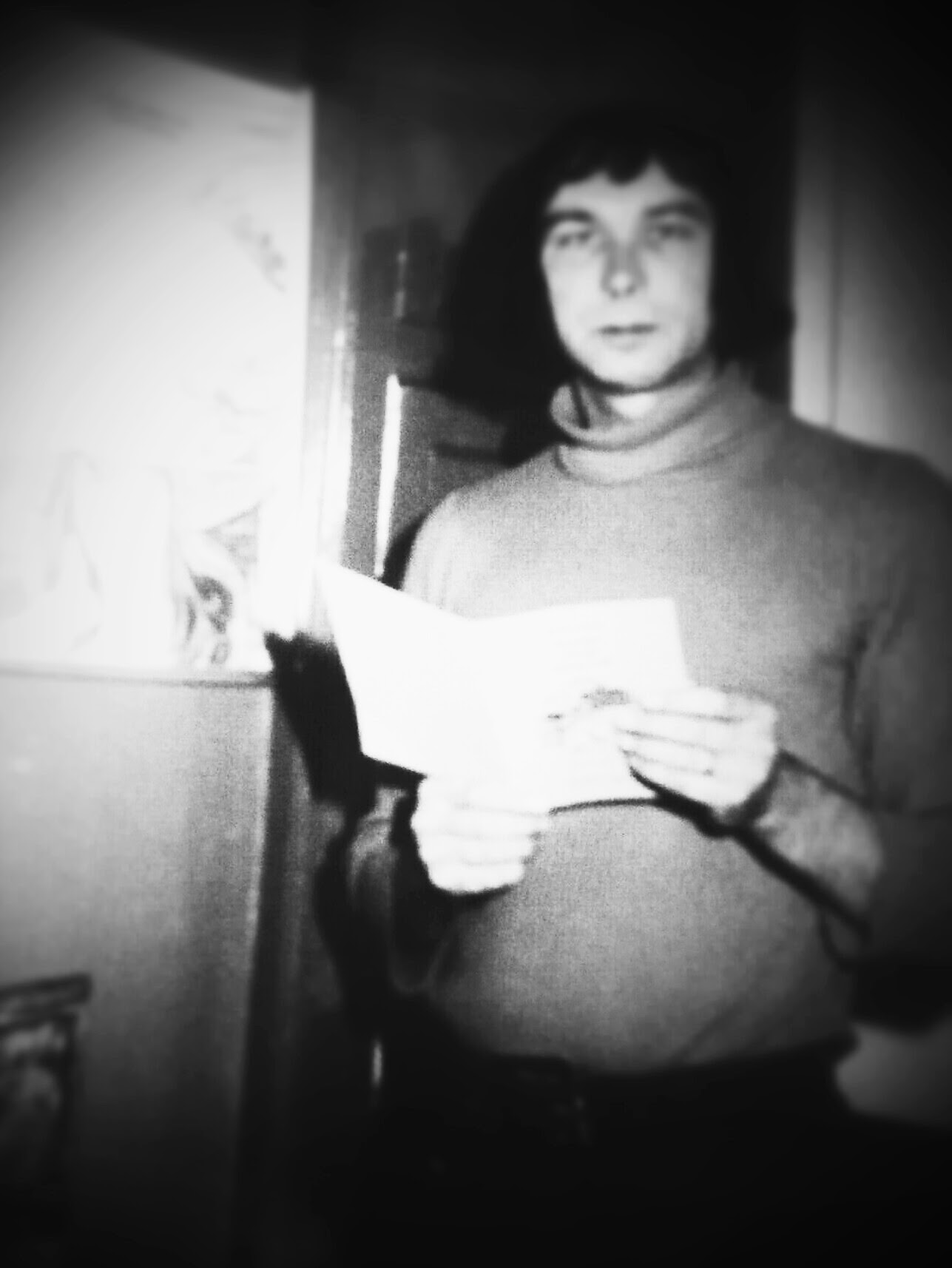
Shaw in 1976

Shaw toured Britain giving "readings" of his poems, sometimes with jazz. He also reviewed, wrote for television and radio, contributed literary criticism and edited The Yorkshire Review for the regional arts association. The magazine was reviewed by Robert Nye in The Times as "distinguished" with "an attractive catholicity". His summary dismissal, without notice, followed his rejection of contributions from two members of the controlling Literature Panel.

== Poetry and jazz ==
Shaw's first poems were published in periodicals while a student at Leeds. However, becoming involved in the late fifties and early sixties, in anti-nuclear protest, with the Committee of 100 and Campaign for Nuclear Disarmament, with his wife, Anne Shaw, a Civil Disobedience activist who illegally distributed the government's secret Spies for Peace document, he did not resume literary work again until 1965.

His early work – Private Time, Public Time, 1969, illustrated by Rigby Graham and published with the financial support of The Arts Council of Great Britain, Causes,1972, and Work in Progress, 1975, was complex and cerebral, with considerable use of ambiguity, but The Wrath Valley Anthology, 1981, with Grindley's Bairns, 1988, marked a more direct, colloquial, even "reductive" approach to irony. The Times Literary Supplement commented, "His wry humour produces a refreshing antidote to the bleak treatment that region (The Pennines) regularly provokes. He can include in his characteristic irony a sense of the predicament of suburban exile. His charmless eccentrics are treated with respect as well as irony."

His major works (except Causes, from The Byron Press) continued to be published by Alan Tarling's Poet & Printer, a small publishing house. In addition, smaller collections like Poems from Haworth, The Lead Age, and Masquerade appeared from fugitive private presses.

Shaw compiled and edited, with a critical survey, the anthology of modern British poetry, Flash Point, 1964, and was himself anthologised in Brian Patten and Pat Krett's The House that Jack Built. Two of his poems – we are going to need poems and A North Country Lass Tells Her Sorrows – were designed as poster-poems by Rigby Graham and Roy Sandford. In 1981 the BBC commissioned a long poem. His reading of this was used as background to a BBC 2 television film about his work in its Pennine setting. His last published collection, in 2000, was Catullus: The Love-Hate Poems Translated by Robert Shaw, in free verse.

Shaw is also a jazz saxophonist, chiefly on tenor (with clarinet), sometimes alto and, unusually, c-melody. His approach to tone and harmony derived from the later, less influential style of Lester Young. He had had a youthful, essential jazz education in the influential rehearsal big band of top trumpeter, Cyril Narbeth.

Shaw has experimented in combining poetry with jazz role in the poetry&jazz project. He was the originator, director and poet, as well as performer of poems. He hired musicians, discussed the poems with them, and sketched the possible jazz responses but left the final musical detail to them. He wanted their improvisation, the defining characteristic of jazz, to interact with his "readings" in public performance. The jazzmen were drawn from jazz groups like those of Ronnie Scott, John Dankworth and Mike Westbrook and the British band of Maynard Ferguson. (Bassist Jeff Clyne, who played a number of engagements with the poetry&jazz touring outfit in 1974, was a member of the Stan Tracey Quartet which made the 1965 classic jazz album inspired by Under Milk Wood.)

A typical programme included straight jazz, poems on their own and, the major ingredient, poetry&jazz fusion. The package broadcast and played a variety of arts and jazz venues, touring Britain from 1972 to 1983, as New Poetry&Jazz (in London, The South and Midlands) and Northern Poetry&Jazz (in The North and Scotland) attracting new followers to both forms. The most settled collaboration was the two years with the Dick Hawdon Quintet.

A representative performance (which received three stars in The Virgin Encyclopedia of Jazz) can be heard on The Yorkshire Arts Association LP, Poetry&Jazz on Record – The Dick Hawden (sic) Quintet with Pete Morgan and Robert Shaw.

During a brief revival of touring in the East Midlands 2000–2002 a recording was made of new material, a sequence of verse portraits by Shaw of great jazzmen set against a duo performance of a number associated with each. The duo consisted of Shaw on reeds and Angharad Griffiths on keyboard. In the early 1980s Leeds College of Music recorded an Electro-Acoustic Setting by Bill Charleson of 3 Poems by Robert Shaw.
