= Penistone Hill Country Park =

Moorland park in West Yorkshire, England

Coordinates: 53°49′34.5″N 1°58′05.2″W

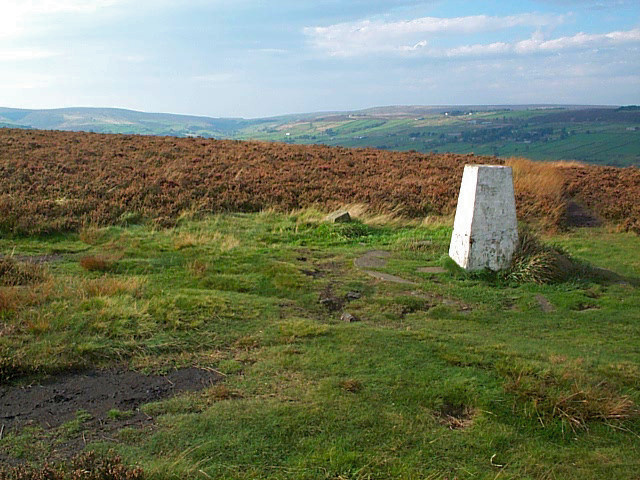
- The view north-west from the trig point in Penistone Hill Country Park
- Interactive map of Penistone Hill Country Park
- Type: Country Park
- Location: West Yorkshire
- Area: 72 hectares (180 acres)
- Operator: City of Bradford MDC; Owned by Yorkshire Water
- Open: All year (unrestricted access)
- Status: Open

Penistone Hill Country Park is an open space of moorland that is located to 0.31 miles (0.5 km) west of Haworth and 0.62 miles (1 km) north-west of Oxenhope in West Yorkshire, England. The park's highest point is detailed with a trig point which is 1,030 feet (310 m) above sea level. Since 1994, the park has been notified as being an SSSI as part of the South Pennine Moors.

Whilst Pen is an old word (notably Welsh for hill) and Penistone (South Yorkshire) means 'Farm on the Hill', it is believed that Penistone Hill derives its name from the gambling game Gamepenny Stone. It is known that men would gather on Penistone Hill to gamble over this game as the quarries afforded the opportunity to gather together easily. Partaking in the game often involved being brought in front of the local magistrates for playing on the local highway or even for playing on a Sunday.

== Site description ==
The park is bounded on the western, northern and eastern sides by public roads, which between them have many access points on foot and eight car parks. The site covers 72 hectares (180 acres) and whilst being owned by Yorkshire Water is promoted and maintained by the City of Bradford Metropolitan District Council on a long-term lease. The site was previously an industrial worked moorland that was extensively quarried for sandstone. The park has an uninterrupted 360 degree vista of the surrounding valleys and moorland and is the starting point for many moorland walks.

The park is mostly open heather moorland, which is abundant with bilberries during summer. Penistone Hill is scarred with lumps of sandstone and small ponds (known as forth ponds) that were used to drain the moorland when it was being mined for coal. One large pond is thought to be a depression caused by a previous mineshaft. The coal underneath the surface was a very thin seam and of poor quality, so when the railway arrived in the Worth Valley, better-quality coal was transported in.

Haworth Cemetery, which opened in 1893, is also within the park and was opened when the graveyard adjacent to St Michael and All Angels in Haworth became full in the late 19th century. The cemetery includes the grave of Lily Cove, who was a stunt parachutist in the early 20th century. As she was preparing to jump from a balloon over Stanbury in June 1906, she jumped free of her parachute and fell to her death. Some have maintained that when she was descending dangerously close to Ponden Reservoir, she deliberately loosened her straps as she was a non-swimmer. However, no one really knows for sure.

The park has become a focal point for memorial plants and benches. There have been concerns that the plants were not appropriate for the moorland and because they were invasive species, they would threaten the moorlands natural habitat. This has led to a new memorial garden being created in Haworth as a repository for these items. Since 2003 Penistone Hill has been home to Literary Landscapes, an artwork comprising two sets of books carved in stone partly buried in the moorland. The installation was inspired by the area's literary and quarrying connections.

== Quarrying ==
Sandstone was formerly quarried in the park, with at least three former quarries adding to the landscape (Dimples, Penistone and West End). Dimples Quarry was used as a source of ashlar stone for buildings in the locality and for roadstone purposes. The sandstone was quarried here up until the late 1960s with infilling of the 82-foot (25 m) quarry in 1973. The quarries were noted for the quality of their sandstone and as such supplied all the stone used in the buildings in the upper Worth Valleys. A heritage trail with sculptures that tracks the history of the quarrying and the geology of the area was created in 2012.

Dimples Quarry was used as a source of stone for Lower Laithe Reservoir to the north-west near Stanbury. The quarried product was taken the short distance to the reservoir head by a narrow gauge railway.

West End Quarry was worked between 1840 and 1960. The sandstone extracted here is known as Woodhouse Flags and involved a rather unusual way of winning the stone. Men would force a bar into the lower reaches of a sandstone cliff and a lookout placed at the lip of the quarry edge would shout out when cracks appeared in the sandstone above. Everyone would then run for safety as the cliff face collapsed.

== Brontë connection ==
The park was used by The Brontë family to gain access to the moors beyond Haworth to the west and the route of the modern day Brontë Way heads across the park. Both Charlotte and Emily were inspired by the moors near to the parsonage and beyond towards Top Withens. Charlotte wrote that Emily found liberty in the bleak solitude.

In March 2016 a section of the country park was used to build a replica of the Parsonage at Haworth. This enabled the BBC to film exterior shots of the building for a drama about the Brontë family called To Walk Invisible. Whilst the building was only temporary, it was labelled a monstrosity. One local councillor commented that it was quite realistic as the actual parsonage was now surrounded by trees that were not present during the time that the Brontë family were in residence.

An application to UNESCO in regards to Haworth village and the surrounding landscape was submitted in 2010. The application noted that

The Brontës, and indeed their work, are recognised as having been shaped by their unique domestic and landscape environment. Their home, Haworth Parsonage, their geographical isolation in hilltop Haworth village and the spectacular desolation of the surrounding moorland scenery provided a vital touchstone for works perceived as shocking....

== Annual fell race ==
The park is the starting point of a 6-mile (9.7 km) fell race that was inaugurated in 1994 and has been held every year since on New Year's Eve. The Auld Lang Syne race is sponsored by Daleside Brewery and has been won in past years by both Alistair and Jonny Brownlee.

== Artworks ==
A series of new artworks were installed in the park during 2025 as a feature of Bradford's year as "UK City of Culture".
