= Haworth =

Village in West Yorkshire, England

Coordinates: 53.83°N 1.96°W

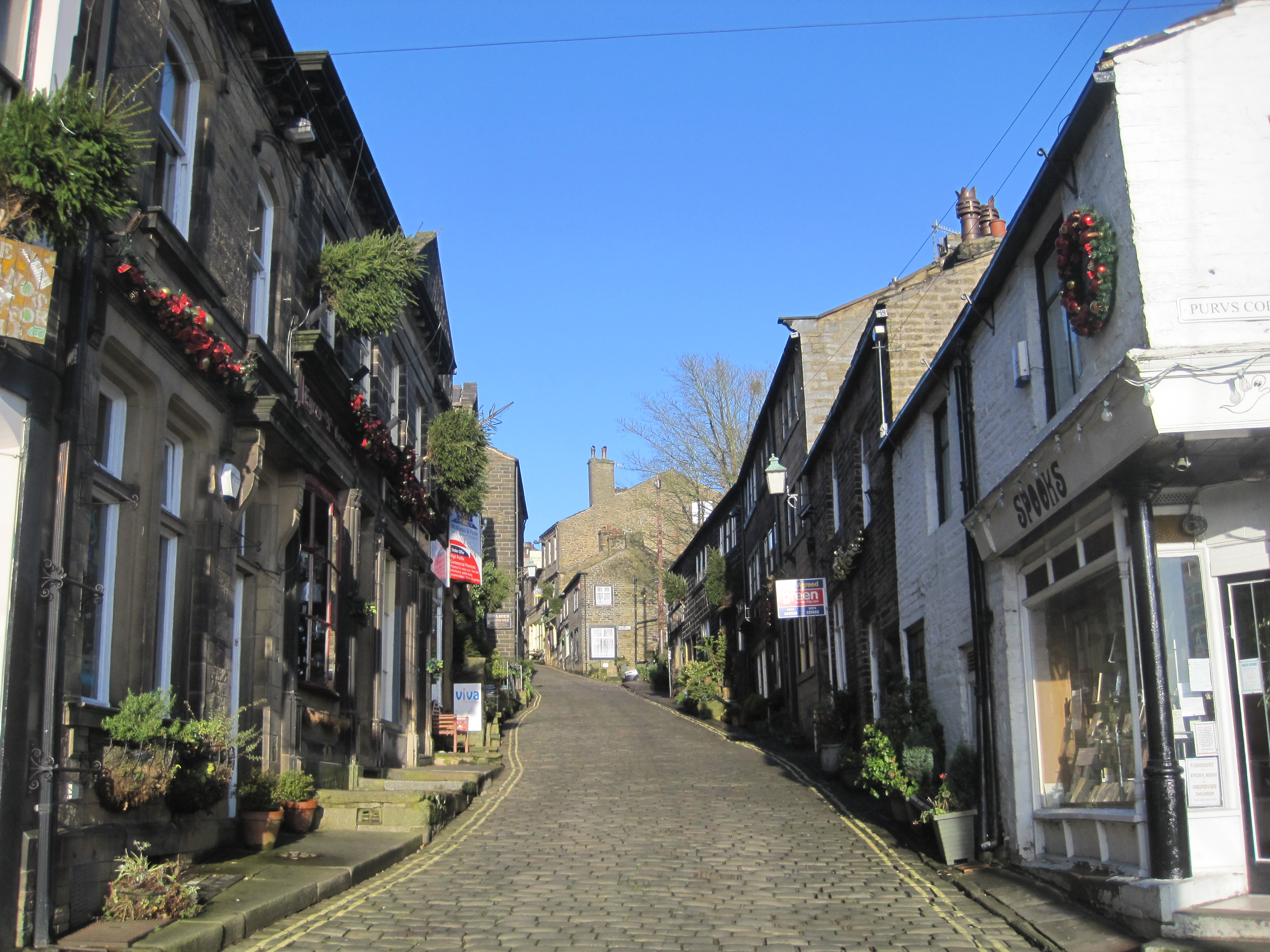
- Main Street

- Location within West Yorkshire
- Population: 6,733 (2021 census)
- OS grid reference: SE030372
  - London: 180 mi (290 km) SSE
- Civil parish: Haworth with Stanbury
- Metropolitan borough: City of Bradford
- Metropolitan county: West Yorkshire
- Region: Yorkshire and the Humber
- Country: England
- Sovereign state: United Kingdom
- Post town: KEIGHLEY
- Postcode district: BD22
- Dialling code: 01535
- Police: West Yorkshire
- Fire: West Yorkshire
- Ambulance: Yorkshire
- UK Parliament: Keighley and Ilkley

Haworth (UK: /ˈhaʊ.ərθ/ HOW-ərth, also /ˈhɔːərθ/ HAW-ərth, US: /ˈhɔːwərθ/ HAW-wərth) is a village in the civil parish of 'Haworth with Stanbury', in the Bradford district, in West Yorkshire, England, in the Pennines 3 miles (5 km) south-west of Keighley, 8 miles (13 km) north of Halifax, 10 miles (16 km) west of Bradford and 10 miles (16 km) east of Colne in Lancashire. The surrounding areas include Oakworth and Oxenhope. Nearby villages include Cross Roads, Stanbury and Lumbfoot.

Haworth is a tourist destination known for its association with the Brontë sisters and the preserved heritage Keighley and Worth Valley Railway.

== History ==
Haworth is first mentioned as a settlement in 1209. The name may refer to a "hedged enclosure" or "hawthorn enclosure". The name was recorded as "Howorth" on a 1771 map.

In 1850, local parish priest Patrick Brontë invited Benjamin Herschel Babbage to investigate the village's high early mortality rate, which had led to all but one of his six children, including the writers Emily and Anne Brontë, dying by the age of 31. Babbage's inspection uncovered deeply unsanitary conditions, including there being no sewers, excrement flowing down Haworth's streets, waste from slaughterhouses and pigsties being held for months in fenced-in areas, overcrowded and poorly-ventilated housing, and a poorly-oxygenated and overcrowded graveyard that filtered into the village's water supply. These conditions contributed to an average life expectancy of 25.8 years and 41.6% of the village's residents dying before the age of 6. This report was presented to the General Board of Health and prompted work to improve conditions in the village.

In 1931 the parish had a population of 5911.

== Governance ==
Haworth was a township and chapelry in the parish of Bradford, and from 1866 it was a civil parish that was abolished on 1 April 1938. Haworth became an urban district in 1894, on 1 April 1938 the district was abolished and merged with the Municipal Borough of Keighley which it was part of until 1974.

Haworth is part of the civil parish of Haworth and Stanbury; from 1 April 1999 to 1 April 2023 it was in the parish of Haworth, Cross Roads and Stanbury, which is part of the Bradford metropolitan district in West Yorkshire.

== Geography ==
Haworth is in the Worth Valley amid the Pennines. It is 212 miles (341 km) north of London, 43 miles (69 km) west of York and 9 miles (14 km) west of Bradford.

== Economy ==
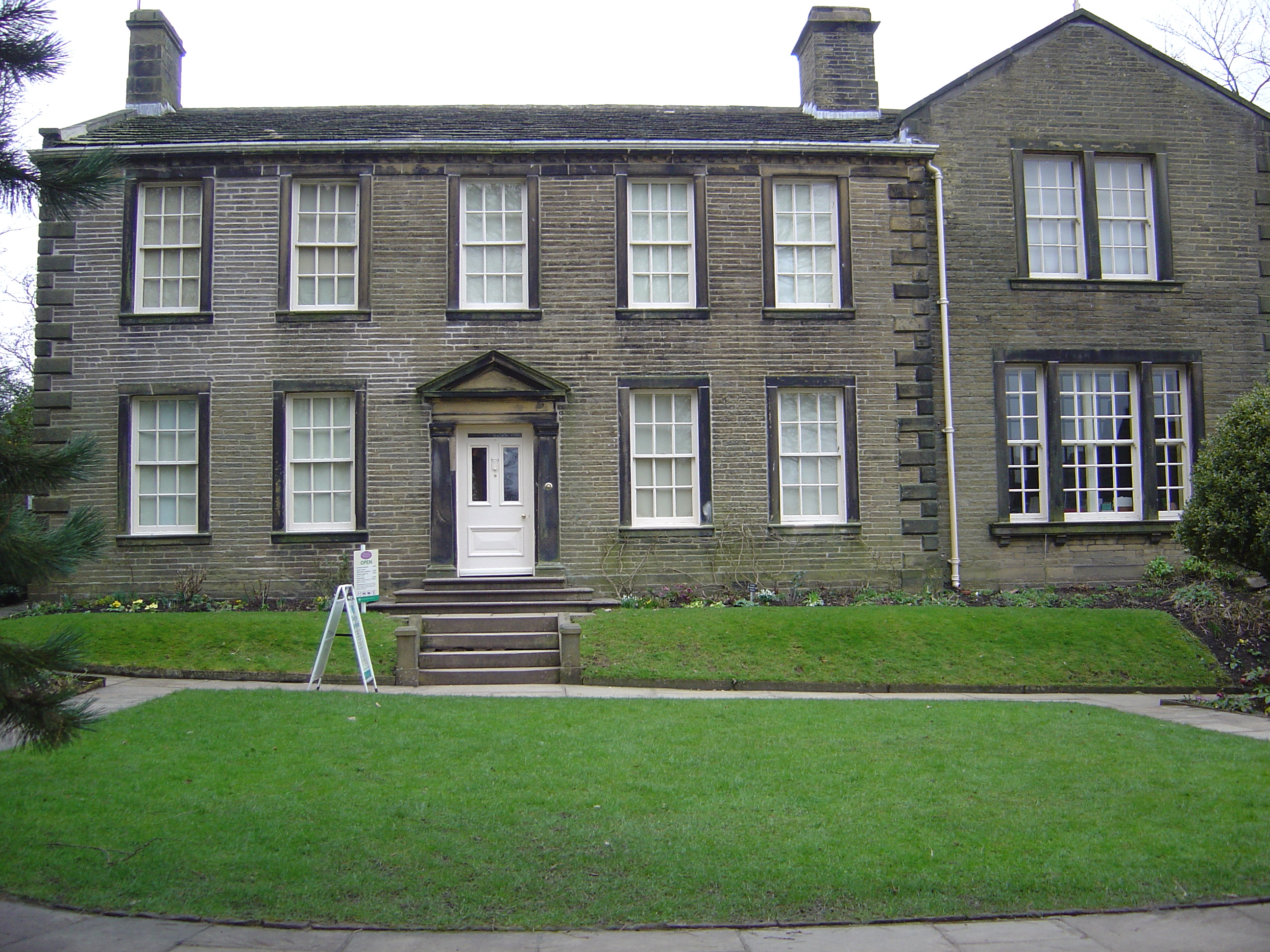
Brontë Parsonage Museum

Tourism now accounts for much of the local economy, though the River Worth flowing through the village powered large textile mills providing much employment, the major attractions now being the heritage railway and Brontë Parsonage Museum. In Haworth, there are tea rooms, souvenir and antiquarian bookshops, restaurants, pubs and hotels, including the Black Bull, where Branwell Brontë's decline into alcoholism and opium addiction allegedly began. Haworth is a base for exploring Brontë Country, while still being close to the major cities of Bradford and Leeds.

On 22 November 2002, Haworth was granted Fairtrade Village status. On 21 October 2005, Haworth Fairtrade officially signed an agreement to twin with Machu Picchu in Peru.

== Culture ==
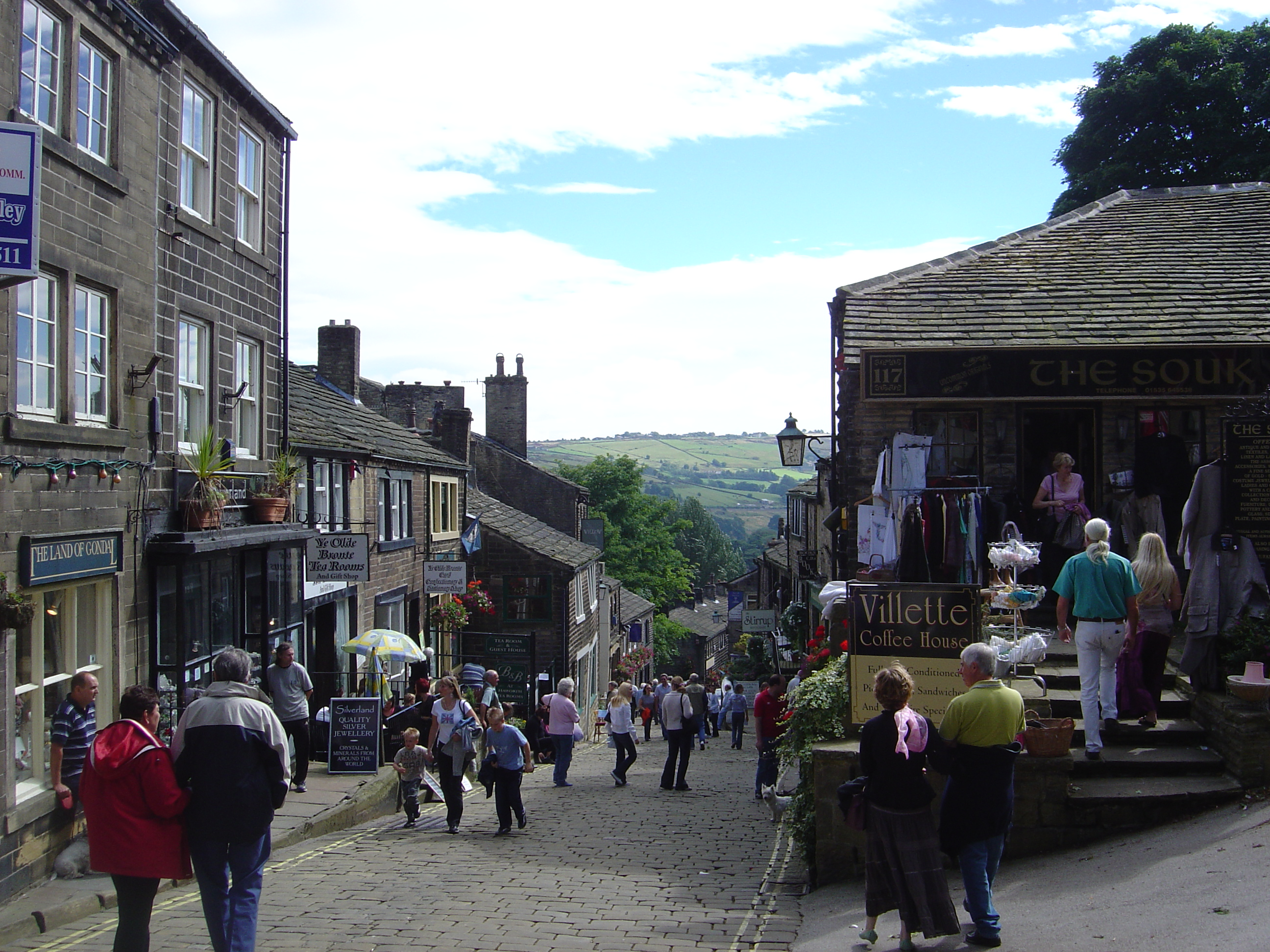
The top of Haworth Main Street

Haworth's traditional events were an annual service at Haworth Spa and the rushbearing. Spa Sunday died out in the early 20th century and the rushbearing ceremony has not been held for many years. A modern event organised by the Haworth Traders' Association is "Scroggling the Holly", which takes place in November. Bands and Morris men lead a procession of children in Victorian costume following the Holly Queen up the cobblestones to a crowning ceremony on the church steps. She unlocks the church gates to invite the spirit of Christmas into Haworth. Father Christmas arrives bringing glad tidings.

The first Haworth Arts Festival took place in 2000 and was repeated in 2001. It was revived in 2005 as a festival combining performing and visual arts and street performance. The festival has community involvement and uses local professional and semi-professional musicians, artists and performers and a larger name to headline each year. It has provided a stage for John Cooper Clarke and John Shuttleworth. The festival has expanded across the Worth Valley outside Haworth and is held on the first weekend in September.

Haworth Band is one of the oldest secular musical organisations in the Keighley area. Historic records indicate that there was a brass band at nearby Ponden in 1854 with a body of excellent performers. It was founded by John Heaton, who lived at Ponden. The band played at a celebration in Haworth at the conclusion of the Crimean War. "Over the years the world of brass band music went from strength to strength, during which time the Haworth Band went with it."

Every year the village hosts a 1940s weekend where locals and visitors don wartime attire for a host of nostalgic events.

From 1971 to 1988, 25 and 27 Main Street housed the Haworth Pottery, where Anne Shaw produced hand-thrown domestic stoneware derived from the arts & crafts tradition. She exhibited widely in the UK and USA in public and private exhibitions and received an arts association award for her ceramic sculptures. Her husband, Robert Shaw, depicted life (and prominent residents) in the village in the 1970s and 80s, in two collections of satires, The Wrath Valley Anthology, 1981, and Grindley's Bairns, 1988, praised by The Times Literary Supplement.

== Community facilities ==
On 13 January 2009, it was announced that a permanent library would be established in the village, replacing the mobile service which visits the village once a week. Haworth last had its own library in 1978. The library is yet to be established.

Central Park, a public park in the middle of the village, was opened in the 1920s. It is listed at Grade II on the Register of Historic Parks and Gardens of Special Historic Interest in England.

== Landmarks ==
The 43-mile-long (69-kilometre) Brontë Way leads past Lower Laithe Reservoir, Stanbury, to the Brontë waterfalls, the Brontë Bridge and the Brontë Stone Chair, in which (it is said) the sisters took turns to sit and write their first stories. It then leads out of the valley and up on the moors to Ponden Hall (reputedly Thrushcross Grange in Emily Brontë's Wuthering Heights) and Top Withens, a desolate ruin which was reputedly the setting for the farmstead Wuthering Heights. Top Withens can also be reached by a shorter walking route departing from the nearby village of Stanbury.

== Transport ==
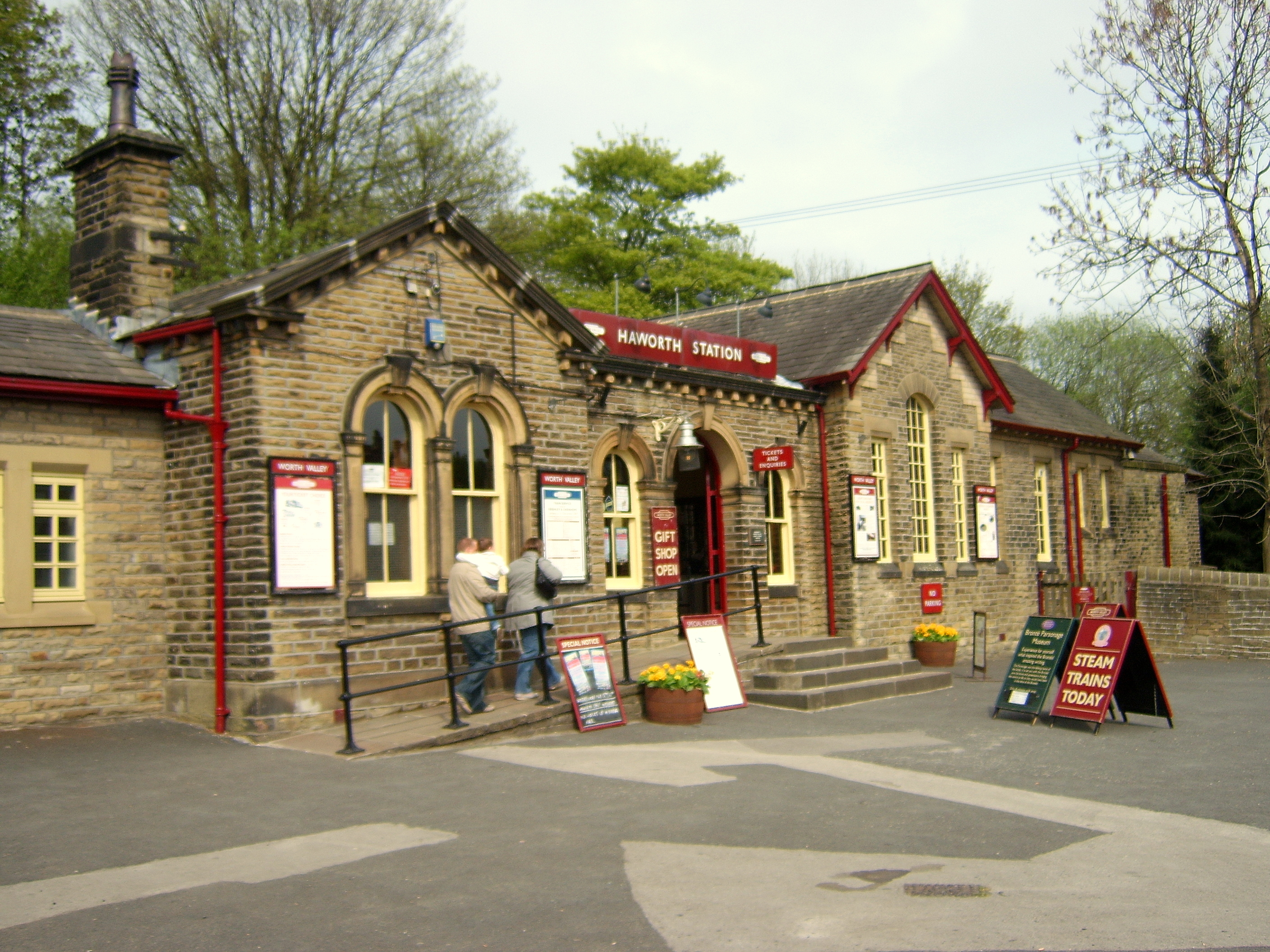
Haworth railway station

Haworth is served by Keighley Bus Company rural bus service which provides links to the main local town of Keighley and the local villages of Oxenhope, Stanbury and Oakworth. There is also a service to Hebden Bridge. Evening and Sunday services are partly paid for by Metro. Overall there are approximately three buses every hour between Haworth and Keighley, with one per hour to each of Stanbury, Oakworth, and Oxenhope (continuing to Hebden Bridge).

Central North Street Car Park Haworth, formerly Changegate Car Park, has been subject of a Channel 4 television documentary "The Yorkshire Clamper", regarding their tactics.

Haworth is also served by Haworth railway station on the Keighley and Worth Valley Railway, a preserved heritage railway.

== Education ==
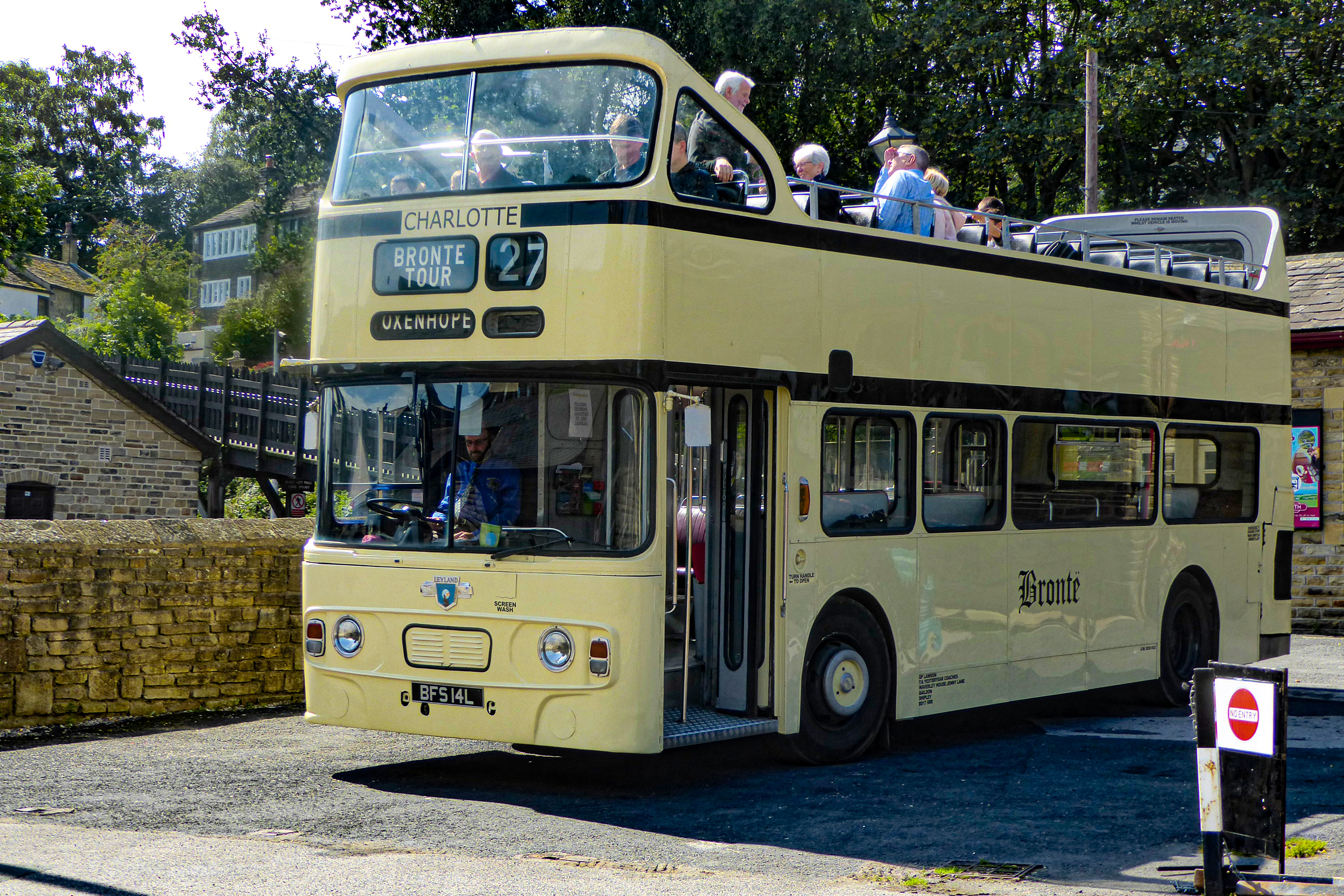
A vintage open-topped bus operating on the Brontë Tour service

Haworth Primary School on Rawdon Road is the only school in the village and takes children from age 3 to 11. Children from 12 to 18 attend secondary schools outside the village at Beckfoot Oakbank in Keighley and Parkside School in Cullingworth.

== Religious sites ==
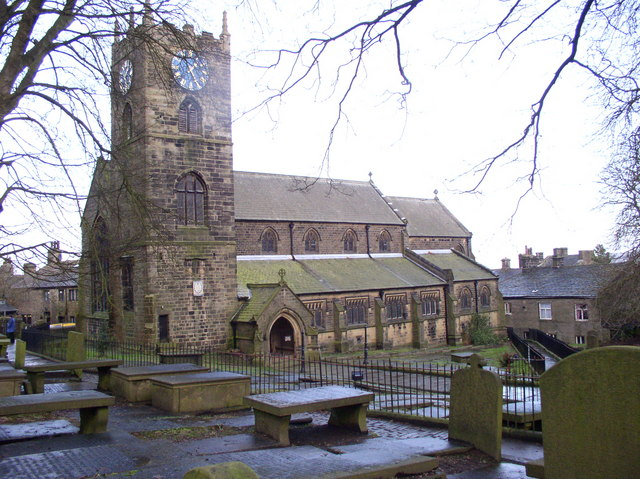
St Michael and All Angels' Church

St Michael and All Angels' Church is situated on Church Street, next to the parsonage. It is part of the Church of England Deanery of Craven.

Baptists in the area met in a barn at the bottom of Brow Road in 1785. They subsequently moved to Hall Green Baptist Church at the junction of Bridgehouse Lane and Sun Street.

== Sport ==
Haworth Cricket Club was established in 1887 as Haworth Wesleyan Cricket Club and were members of the English Cricket Board. They had a permanent ground north-west of the village centre, but the club was closed down in 2015. Haworth West End Cricket Club was formed in 1900 as the Haworth West Lane Baptist Cricket Club.

On 6 July 2014, Stage 2 of the 2014 Tour de France from York to Sheffield, passed through the village.

== Notable people ==
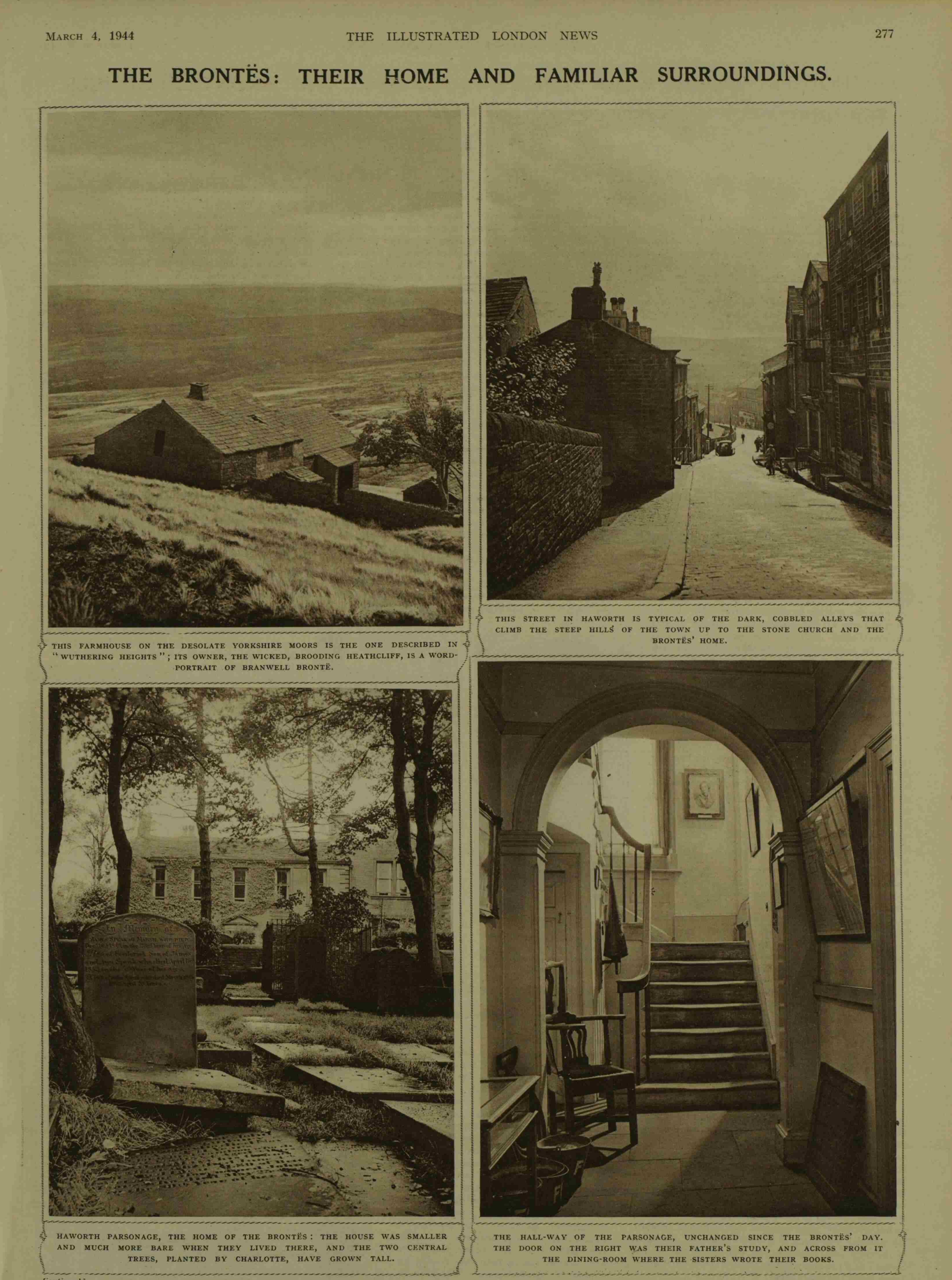
"The Brontës, Their Home And Familiar Surroundings", article from 1944

The Brontë sisters were born in Thornton near Bradford, but wrote most of their novels while living at Haworth Parsonage when their father was the parson at the Church of St. Michael and All Angels. In the 19th century, the village and surrounding settlements were largely industrialised, which put it at odds with the popular portrayal in Wuthering Heights, which only bore resemblance to the upper moorland that Emily Brontë was accustomed to. The Parsonage is now a museum owned and maintained by the Brontë Society.

== Filmography ==
Haworth and Haworth railway station have been used as settings for numerous period films and TV series, including The Railway Children (starring Jenny Agutter), Yanks (starring Richard Gere and Vanessa Redgrave), and Alan Parker's film version of Pink Floyd's The Wall (starring Bob Geldof). It also featured in Rita, Sue and Bob Too with George Costigan; Wild Child (starring Emma Roberts), and "The Souk" (a high-class vintage shop) was depicted as a charity shop.

In 2016 the BBC drama To Walk Invisible was shot in and around Haworth and included a full-scale replica of the Brontë Parsonage, Old School Rooms and Haworth Church at the time of the Brontës on nearby Penistone Hill.

== Twinning ==
- Haworth, New Jersey, United States
- Machu Picchu, Peru

== See also ==
- Listed buildings in Haworth, Cross Roads and Stanbury
