= Brontë Waterfall =

Waterfall in Stanbury, West Yorkshire, England

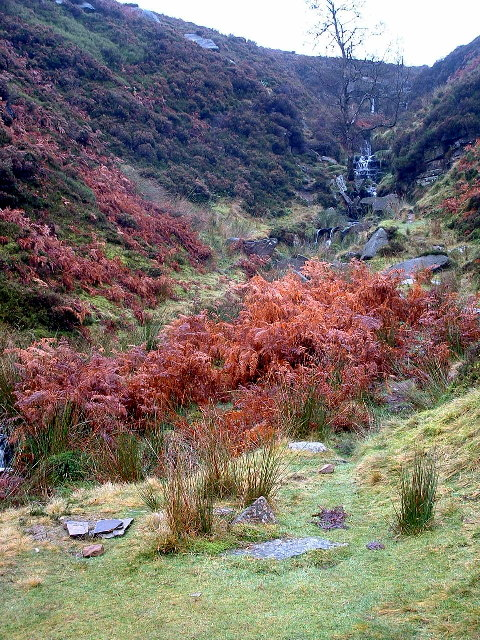
- Interactive map of Brontë Waterfall
- Location: West Yorkshire, England
- Coordinates: 53°49′6.05″N 2°0′12.95″W

Brontë Waterfall on the South Dean Beck is about a mile south-west of Stanbury, near Haworth in West Yorkshire, England. Beck is a dialect word for a stream. The waterfall is known to have been appreciated by the Brontë sisters.

The area surrounding the waterfall is mainly moorland and farmland in Brontë Country, an area famous for its association with the sisters. There is a plaque with a quotation from Psalm 104 (How manifold are Thy works...), evidently referring to the natural beauty of the site.

Below the falls is Brontë Bridge, an old stone bridge across the beck. A flash flood in May 1989, swept the bridge away. In March 1990, a Lynx helicopter from No. 9 Regiment Army Air Corps, airlifted five gritstone slabs into the narrow valley to allow park rangers to repair the crossing.

== Brontë Way ==
The waterfall can be reached on a waymarked route from Haworth, part of the Brontë Way. There are bilingual English-Japanese signs.

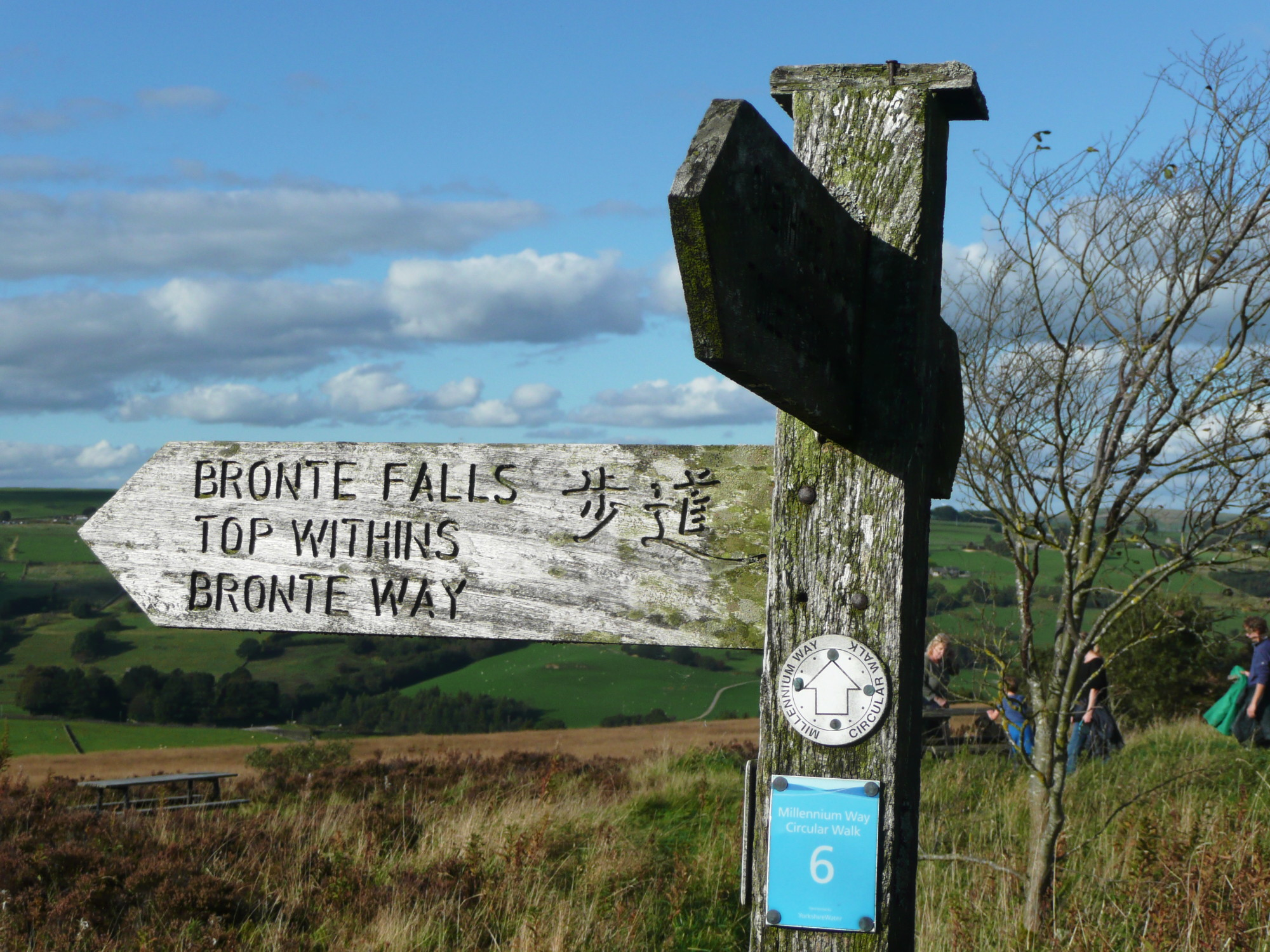

Continuing upwards from the waterfall, Top Withens can be reached on the same walk. The location of the ruined farmhouse is reputed to have been the inspiration for the setting of Wuthering Heights, Emily Brontë's only novel, published in 1847.

== See also ==
- Brontë Parsonage Museum
- List of waterfalls
- List of waterfalls in England
