= Brontë Way =

43-mile footpath in northern England

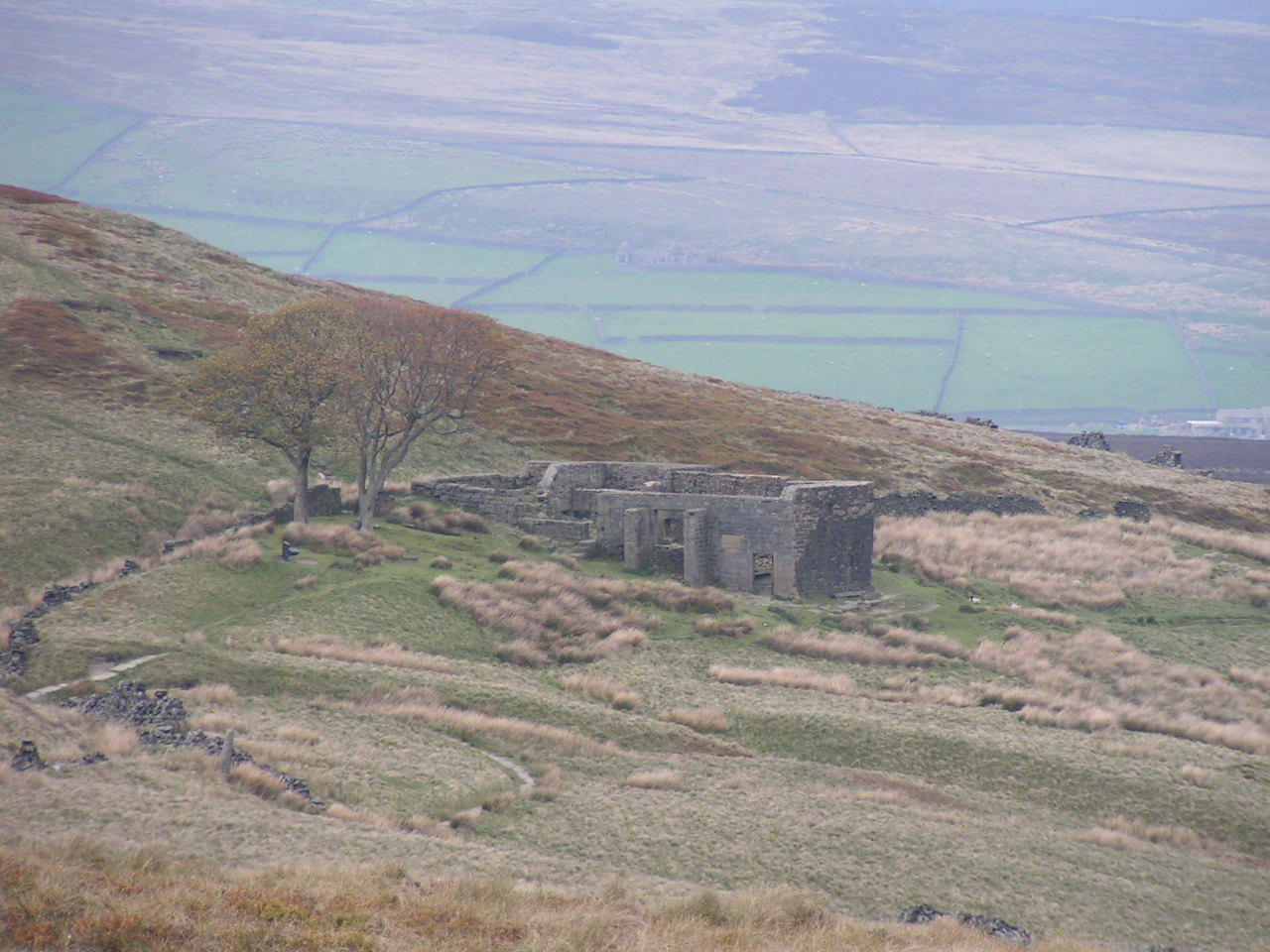
- Top Withens
- Length: 43 mi (69 km)
- Location: West Yorkshire and Lancashire, England
- Trailheads: Birstall; 53.739°N 1.672°W; Padiham; 53.802°N 2.296°W
- Use: Hiking
- Sights: Brontë literary connections

The Brontë Way is a waymarked long-distance footpath in the northern counties of West Yorkshire and Lancashire, England.

== Route ==
The Brontë Way starts at Oakwell Hall in Birstall, West Yorkshire, and finishes at Gawthorpe Hall in Padiham, Lancashire. It runs for 43 miles (69 km).

The route has been designed to link places that have strong associations with the writings of the Brontë family, incorporating places that feature in their work, such as Oakwell Hall, Charlotte Brontë's inspiration for Fieldhead in her 1849 novel Shirley. The route passes through Thornton, where the Brontë children were born, and Haworth and Haworth Parsonage, where the family lived. Literary tourists often join the Way at Haworth, passing through Penistone Hill Country Park and open moorland to see the Brontë Waterfall and Top Withens, Emily Brontë's possible inspiration for the home in her 1847 novel Wuthering Heights.

As well as its literary associations, the Way passes through areas of industrial heritage interest.

There are public transport links to the route and its four main sections. Two guidebooks are available.
