= To Walk Invisible =

Television drama about the Brontë family

- DVD cover
- Genre: Historical drama
- Written by: Sally Wainwright
- Directed by: Sally Wainwright
- Starring: Finn Atkins; Rebecca Callard; Charlie Murphy; Adam Nagaitis; Chloe Pirrie; Jonathan Pryce
- Country of origin: United Kingdom
- Original language: English

Production
- Executive producers: Faith Penhale; Sally Wainwright
- Producer: Karen Lewis
- Running time: 120 minutes
- Production companies: BBC Cymru Wales; Lookout Point; The Open University

Original release
- Network: BBC One
- Release: 29 December 2016

To Walk Invisible is a British television film about the Brontë family that aired on BBC One on 29 December 2016. The drama was written and directed by Sally Wainwright and focused on the relationship of the three Brontë sisters; Charlotte, Emily and Anne, and their brother, Branwell.

In the United States, it aired on 26 March 2017 on PBS as part of Masterpiece Theater, under the title To Walk Invisible: The Brontë Sisters.

== Title ==
The title of the drama comes from a letter that Charlotte Brontë had written to her publisher about once meeting a clergyman who did not realise that she was Currer Bell. It suited her and her sisters that they were not famous; "What author would be without the advantage of being able to walk invisible?"

== Plot ==
In 1845, the Brontë family, consisting of Patrick Brontë, his daughters Charlotte, Emily and Anne, and his son Branwell, are reunited after Branwell is dismissed from his position as tutor, and Anne, who had been working as a governess for the same family, resigns alongside him. Anne reluctantly tells her sisters that Branwell was dismissed for having had sexual relations with the mistress of the house.

Anne and her sister Charlotte discuss their shared hobby of writing. Branwell's drunken and undisciplined behaviour troubles all three sisters, whose father is blind and sickly and they rely on the parish for their living. Charlotte, terrified of a future where she is financially dependent on Branwell, talks to him about his future plans, and he reveals he has had a few poems published, but because of the low payment rates, is considering a novel. The conversation makes Charlotte wonder if she and her sisters might be able to publish their own poetry and attempt novels. She searches through Emily's room and uncovers her poems, which she finds brilliant. Emily reacts violently to the breach of privacy, but Anne is intrigued by the idea of publication and shows Charlotte some of her poems and a novel she is working on. Charlotte, though unimpressed by Anne's work, thinks that the three sisters should try to publish a volume of poetry they can use to establish themselves. The sisters pay to have Poems by Currer, Ellis, and Acton Bell published and use pseudonyms so as not to be discriminated against because of their sex. They keep the publication secret from their father and brother.

Branwell hears from his mistress and discovers her husband has died. His will provides that she will lose both her money and her house if she remarries or is seen with Branwell. Branwell sinks further into alcoholism and becomes more violent. The sisters have written novels and begin to send them out to publishers; Emily and Anne have some success but Charlotte's first attempt fails. Charlotte takes their father for cataract surgery and during his recovery period she begins work on a second novel, Jane Eyre. Charlotte urges her sisters to go forward with publication without her and begins to look for a publisher for Jane Eyre.

Branwell returns from a long illness, severely unwell. The family tries to nurse him back to health but sudden sobriety means that he begins to experience hallucinations. The situation worsens while the family is forced to pay off his debts. Jane Eyre is accepted for publication and all three books are incredibly successful. After yet another incident with Branwell harassing their father for money, Emily urges her sisters to reveal the success of their books to their father to alleviate his worries about their future. The sisters ask their father not to reveal their success to Branwell, as they have achieved what he only dreamt of.

Charlotte becomes enraged after Thomas Cautley Newby (Anne and Emily's publisher) tries to pass off The Tenant of Wildfell Hall, a book written by Anne, as being Charlotte's work. She insists that the sisters travel to London and reveal themselves to be separate authors. Anne agrees to go with her sister but Emily refuses, insisting on protecting her anonymity. After Charlotte and Anne introduce themselves, they are greeted with great enthusiasm by their publishers, who take them to the opera. When they return home they find Branwell critically ill; he eventually dies. When a close friend comes to stay, all four women are walking on the moors when they witness a sun dog a phenomenon where three suns seem to appear in the sky. The friend says that the suns represent the three sisters and their fame is implied.

A postscript reveals that Emily died three months after Branwell and Anne died five months after her and that the parsonage was later turned into a museum celebrating the sisters and their work.

== Cast ==
- Finn Atkins as Charlotte Brontë
- Charlie Murphy as Anne Brontë
- Chloe Pirrie as Emily Brontë
- Adam Nagaitis as Branwell Brontë
- Jonathan Pryce as Patrick Brontë
- Rosie Boore as Young Charlotte
- Lara McDonnell as Young Anne
- Talia Barnett as Young Emily
- Troy Tipple as Young Branwell
- James Norton as the Duke of Wellington
- Matt Adams as Captain Parry and Jack Sharp
- Kris Mochrie as Captain Ross
- Jonathan Carley as Napoleon Bonaparte
- June Watson as Tabby Aykroyd
- Mark Frost as John Brown
- Megan Parkinson as Martha Brown
- Rebecca Callard as Miss Pratchett
- Thomas Nelstrop as Dr John Wheelhouse
- Rory Fleck Byrne as Arthur Nicholls
- Jamie Dorrington as Enoch Thomas
- Gracie Kelly as Ellen Nussey
- Thomas Howes as Samuel Hartley
- Luke Newberry as George Smith

== Production ==
=== Writing ===
BAFTA-winning writer Sally Wainwright, whose other credits include crime drama Happy Valley and comedy-drama Last Tango in Halifax, both set in Yorkshire, said she was "thrilled beyond measure" to have been asked by the BBC to "bring to life these three fascinating, talented, ingenious Yorkshire women".

=== Filming ===
The drama was filmed mostly in Yorkshire with Haworth being used extensively during filming. A replica of the Parsonage at Haworth was constructed on the moorland in Penistone Hill Country Park, just west of Haworth. This allowed external scenes to be filmed away from the real Parsonage in the village. The replica parsonage was also added to with other buildings and a street to make a small set of how Haworth looked at the time of the Brontës, with at least one local councillor pointing out that in their time, the Parsonage was not shaded by trees as it is now.

Interior scenes were filmed in studios at Manchester as filming in the actual Parsonage itself was not possible. Other external scenes were filmed within the city of York and the Calder Valley in West Yorkshire.

== Critical reception ==
On review aggregating web site Rotten Tomatoes, the film has achieved a score of 83% based on six reviews, for an average rating of 7.5/10.

Lucy Mangan, writing in The Guardian, described the drama as "bleak, beautiful and brilliant; like everything that Wainwright and her repertory company does". She also praised Nagaitis' performance as "a blazing performance [which] conveys the inner torment as well as the selfishness and keeps our sympathy even as he drives us up the wall".

The Telegraph's Jasper Rees gave the drama five stars out of five describing the episode as "the Brontë sisters brought to fizzing, furious life," and similarly praised Adam Nagaitis' acting, noting that it was excellent.

The programme also attracted numerous comments on social media, with many viewers expressing their displeasure about a fine performance ruined by what they felt to be the poor quality of the film's sound recording.

The characterisation of the Brontë family was criticised by Brontë researcher Peggy Hewitt for what she saw as Branwell's character being overplayed, Charlotte's "constant mean pinched look" and the representation of Patrick Brontë as "mild and ineffectual" when she claims he was a "fiery Irishman, Cambridge graduate, [and a] forward-looking social reformer."
