= Lumbfoot =

Hamlet in West Yorkshire, England

Coordinates: 53.8333°N 1.9798°W

- Cottages at Lumbfoot (2008)

- Location within West Yorkshire
- OS grid reference: SE016375
  - London: 180 mi (290 km) SSE
- Civil parish: Haworth, Cross Roads and Stanbury
- Metropolitan borough: City of Bradford
- Metropolitan county: West Yorkshire
- Region: Yorkshire and the Humber
- Country: England
- Sovereign state: United Kingdom
- Post town: KEIGHLEY
- Postcode district: BD22
- Police: West Yorkshire
- Fire: West Yorkshire
- Ambulance: Yorkshire
- UK Parliament: Keighley and Ilkley

Lumbfoot or Lumb Foot is a hamlet in the Haworth, Cross Roads and Stanbury civil parish, and the City of Bradford metropolitan district, England. It is situated approximately 1 mile (1.6 km) from Haworth and less than half a mile north-east from Stanbury. The hamlet is historically part of the West Riding of Yorkshire. Lumbfoot overlooks a number of fields and a small brook, and contains 15 households and a farm. There is no public road; access is by a private road for vehicles, and a public footpath.

== History ==
Lumbfoot Mill, built on the floor of a valley, was originally water powered but adopted steam power in c. 1900. The mill has since been largely demolished but a 15-foot stump of the chimney and the engine house still remain, and there is evidence of the pit that housed the original waterwheel among the ruins. A row of cottages at Lumbfoot, which today are modernised, were constructed between 1840 and 1852 to house mill workers.

== Gallery ==
Lumbfoot Mill about 1900, from an old postcard

Lumbfoot cottages about 1900, from an old postcard

Sign at Lumbfoot showing population
