= Haworth Pottery =

Pottery company from West Yorkshire, England

Coordinates: 53.8292°N 1.9541°W

The Haworth Pottery was established by Anne Shaw in 1971 in Haworth, West Yorkshire, England. The pottery was initially supported by a loan from the Council for Small Industries in Rural Areas. Shaw trained under Beresford Pealing of Harnham Mill Pottery at Southampton College of Art (now Southampton Solent University) on the professional potters' course.

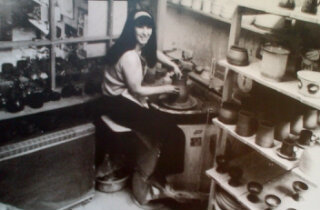
Anne Shaw at the wheel, Haworth Pottery, 1988

The pottery was housed in a Grade II listed building, a stone, three-storey former handloom-weaver's residence at 25 & 27 Main Street. The pottery had a glaze-room, a workshop with a large kiln and wheel and upper and lower showrooms. Shaw produced hand-thrown domestic stoneware of a type pioneered by Bernard Leach in an Arts & Crafts tradition. The pottery differed, in its hand-made techniques and the type of clay used, from industrial pottery produced locally in the 19th century. The pots produced were high-fired—the second (glaze) firing taken to 1300 °C. Shaw also created ceramic sculptures and received a Yorkshire Arts Association award.

Most studio-potteries were located in the South-West, Cornwall and The Cotswolds, close to affluent middle class patronage. Haworth Pottery, therefore, represented a pioneering expansion of the Arts and Crafts Movement northwards, nearer to major industrial settlements. It introduced people familiar only with highly decorated industrial, commercial pottery to an alternative, hand-thrown pre-industrial mode of production with an emphasis on form, texture and glazes, where each pot had individuality. Most of the pottery's output was sold directly to the public from the Haworth showroom or its gallery on The Square, at Grassington, North Yorkshire, with the remainder wholesale to other outlets, including Heal's and galleries. Shaw received commissions from Leeds and Bradford churches, she exhibited at the Crafts Council's Crafts Advisory Committee Gallery in Leeds, the Mid-Pennine Arts Association Gallery in Blackburn, the National Media Museum gallery, Bradford Library Art Gallery, Southampton College of Art, York Arts Centre and, as an honorary member of the Yorkshire Guild of Craftsmen at St Martin's in Micklegate, York. Her work was included in an exhibition of Yorkshire Contemporary Arts & Crafts sponsored by the Hammonds Sauce Company and the British Tourist Board which toured the US.

The pottery closed in 1988.
