= Ponden Hall =

Farmhouse in West Yorkshire, England

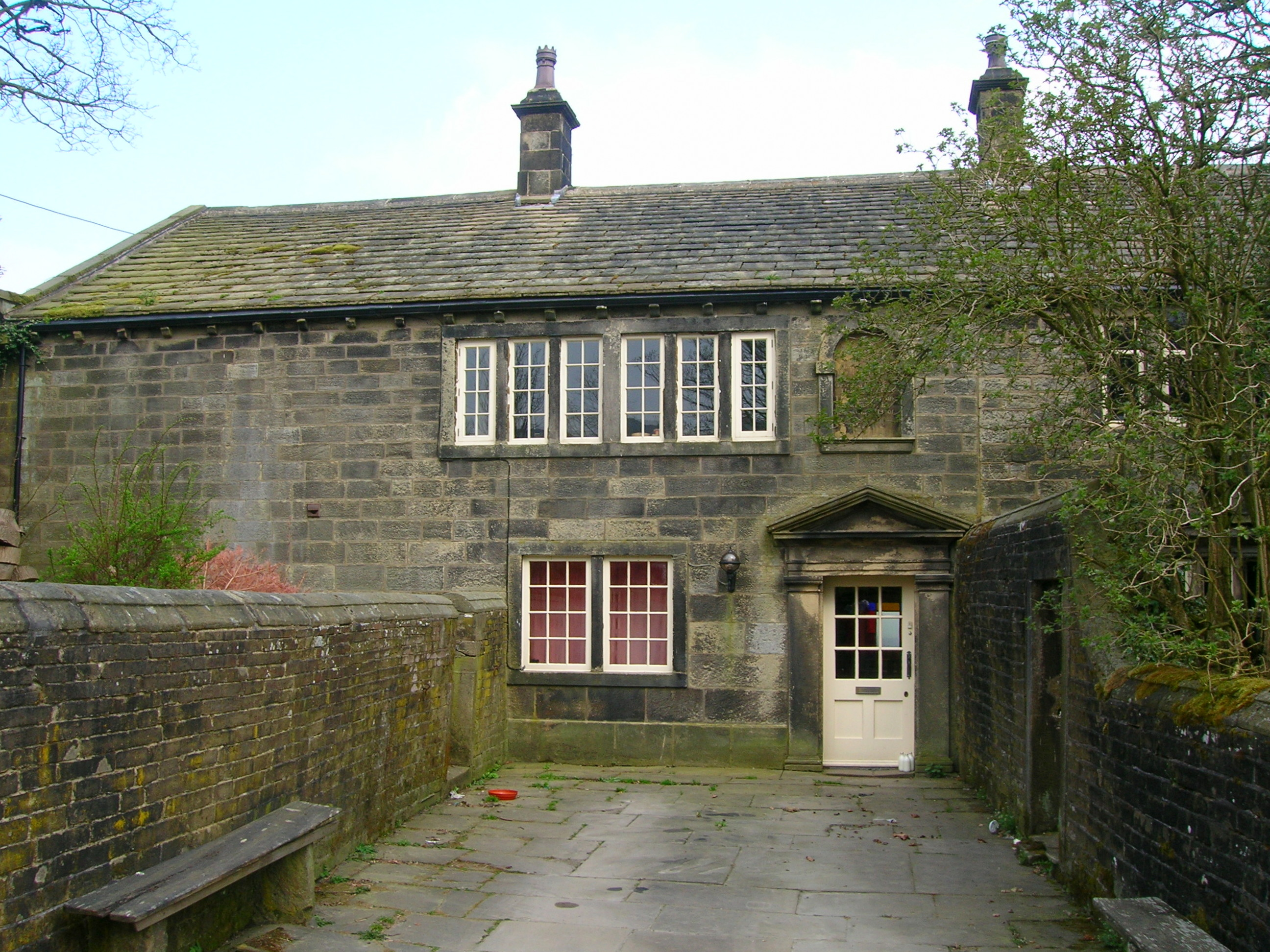
- West Part of Ponden Hall

- Location within West Yorkshire
- 53°49′48″N 2°00′56″W
- Location: Stanbury

Site notes
- Area: West Yorkshire

Listed Building – Grade II*
- Official name: Ponden Hall
- Designated: 23 February 1955
- Reference no.: 1313937

Ponden Hall is a farmhouse near Stanbury in West Yorkshire, England. It is famous for reputedly being the inspiration for Thrushcross Grange, the home of the Linton family, Edgar, Isabella, and Cathy, in Emily Brontë's novel Wuthering Heights since Brontë was a frequent visitor. However, it does not match the description given in the novel and is closer in size and appearance to the farmhouse of Wuthering Heights itself.

The Brontë biographer Winifred Gerin believed that Ponden Hall was the original of Wildfell Hall, the old mansion where Helen Graham, the protagonist of Anne Brontë's The Tenant of Wildfell Hall, fled from her husband. Ponden shares certain architectural details with Wildfell: latticed windows, a central portico and date plaque above.

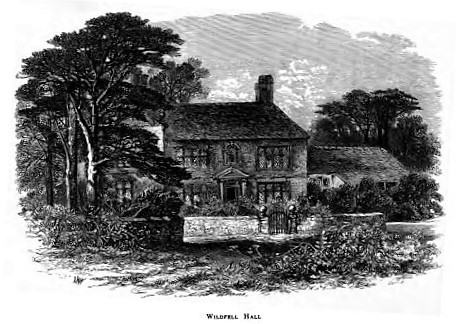
Wildfell Hall, supposedly inspired by Ponden Hall, in the engraving by Edmund Morison Wimperis.

The "old house" was built in 1634 by Robert Heaton (1587–1641) for his son, Michael Heaton (1609–1643), although the east end incorporates an older building from 1541. The "old porch and peat house" was later built by Michael's son Robert (1642–1704) and in 1801 the hall was re-built by Robert's great-grandson, Robert Heaton (1757–1817).

In the early 19th century Ponden Hall held what was reputedly the largest private library in Yorkshire, which saw regular visits from Brontë children as they and the Heaton children would play together as well. There are two entwined withered pear trees on the property, said to be planted there by one of the boys, Robert, as he longed for Emily's heart (was not meant to be as she was a little older). In the 19th century the Heaton family were textile manufacturers – particularly wool. With the death of Robert in 1898, the last surviving Heaton male, the Hall was sold. The final Heaton male, George Smith Heaton, the son of Michael and Ellen Heaton of Royd House, died penniless at the Bendigo Benevolent Asylum in Victoria, Australia, on 12 February 1901.

The house is a Grade II* listed building. The summary states that it was built in 1634 with an addition in 1801. "Coursed stone, stone slate roof, 2 storeys". The listing also listing states that the "farmstead built on the opposite side of the road" was demolished in 1956.

The property was converted in 2014 into an award-winning bed-and-breakfast establishment.

A September 2020 article in Country Life magazine provided an update, with photographs, about the property, after it was listed for sale for £1 million. The main house includes eight bedrooms while the annex has two. A great deal of care had been taken during restorations to maintain authenticity: "the beams, walls, floors, ceilings, fireplaces and windows are gloriously authentic".

== See also ==
- Grade II* listed buildings in Bradford
- Listed buildings in Haworth, Cross Roads and Stanbury
