= Stanbury =

Village in West Yorkshire, England

Coordinates: 53.8297°N 1.9862°W

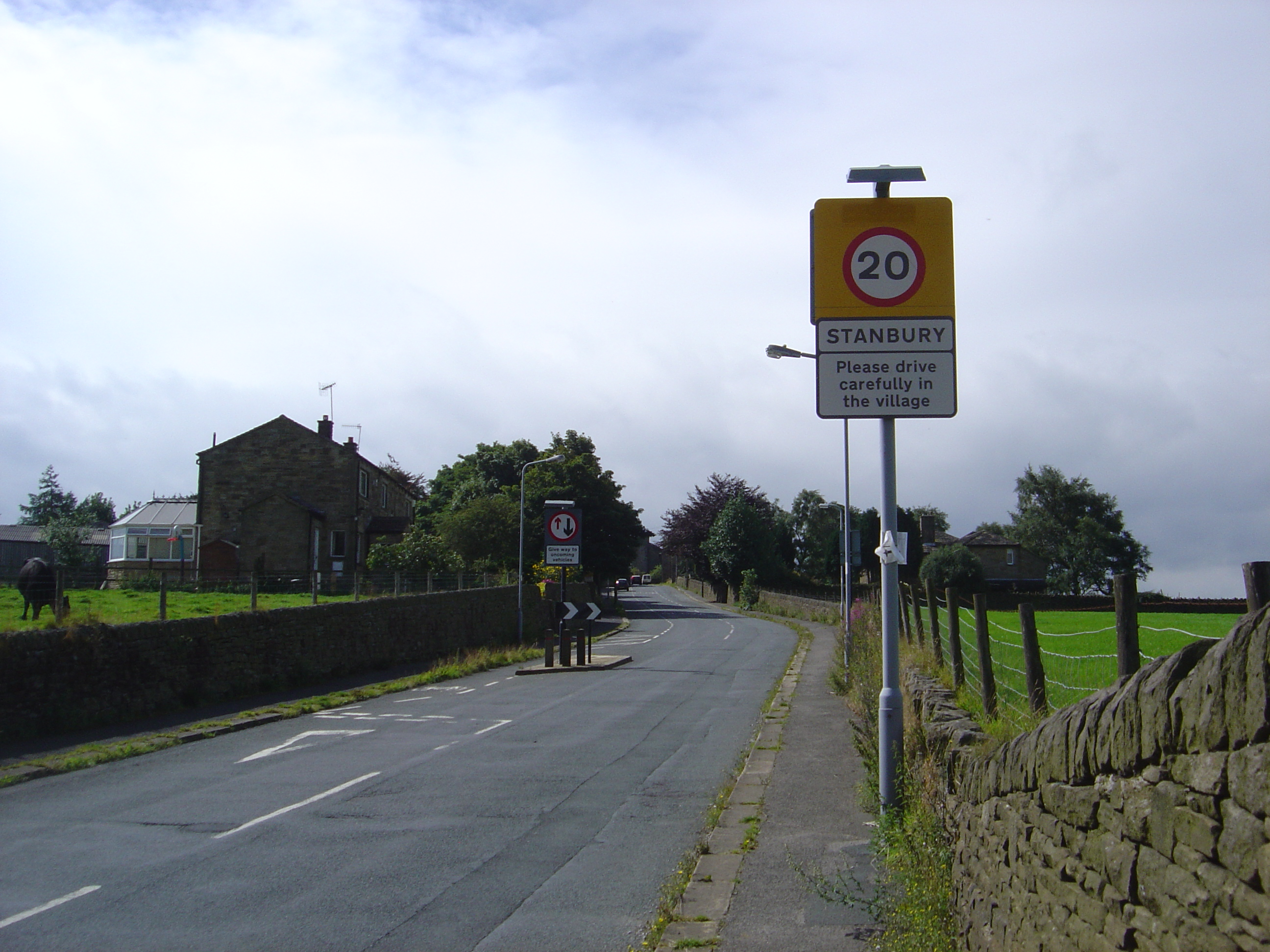
- Entry to Main Street, Stanbury

- Location within West Yorkshire
- OS grid reference: SE010370
  - London: 180 mi (290 km) SSE
- Civil parish: Haworth and Stanbury
- Metropolitan borough: City of Bradford
- Metropolitan county: West Yorkshire
- Region: Yorkshire and the Humber
- Country: England
- Sovereign state: United Kingdom
- Post town: KEIGHLEY
- Postcode district: BD22
- Police: West Yorkshire
- Fire: West Yorkshire
- Ambulance: Yorkshire
- UK Parliament: Keighley and Ilkley

Stanbury is a village and former civil parish, now in the parish of Haworth and Stanbury, in the metropolitan borough of the City of Bradford in West Yorkshire, England. In 1931 the parish had a population of 453. The name Stanbury translates as Stone Fort from Old English.

== Geography ==
The village is situated approximately 1 mile (1.6 km) west from Haworth, 4 miles (6.4 km) south-west from Keighley, and 9 miles (14 km) east from Colne in Lancashire. Less than half a mile north-east is the hamlet of Lumbfoot. Stanbury is Historically part of the West Riding of Yorkshire. The River Worth is immediately north of the village and Sladen Beck is just to the south. Two paths pass through the village; The Brontë Way and The Pennine way.

== Landmarks ==
The surrounding countryside is mainly moors and farmland. Ponden Reservoir was built in the 1870s and a reservoir was approved to be built at Lower Laithe on Sladen Beck in 1869, but it was not started until 1911. Due to the nation being involved in the First World War, the reservoir was not completed until 1925. Its completion necessitated the abandonment of the hamlet of Smith Bank. The village is close to the Brontë Waterfall and Top Withens tourist landmarks. Emily Brontë is reputed to have used Top Withens as the model for the location of Wuthering Heights, and nearby Ponden Hall (half a mile from the edge of Stanbury) has been considered the model for 'Thrushcross Grange' in the same book. It has also been theorized that Ponden Hall is actually the setting for Wuthering Heights as its size is smaller than that of Thrushcross Grange as described in the book. There are also additional theories that the hall is the model for Wildfell Hall in Anne Brontë's The Tenant of Wildfell Hall. There is an Anglican church in Stanbury built in 1848. In 1998, it was named St Gabriels, after spending the previous 150 years without a name. The school caters for primary school age children. There are two public houses: The Friendly and the Wuthering Heights which dates from 1763 and was formerly and locally known as 'The Cross'. The Old Silent Inn (formerly The Eagle) is a public house and guest house close to the village which is over 400 years old.

== Governance ==
Stanbury became a civil parish on 31 December 1894 being formed from part of Haworth, on 1 April 1938 the parish was abolished and merged with Keighley.

== Gallery ==
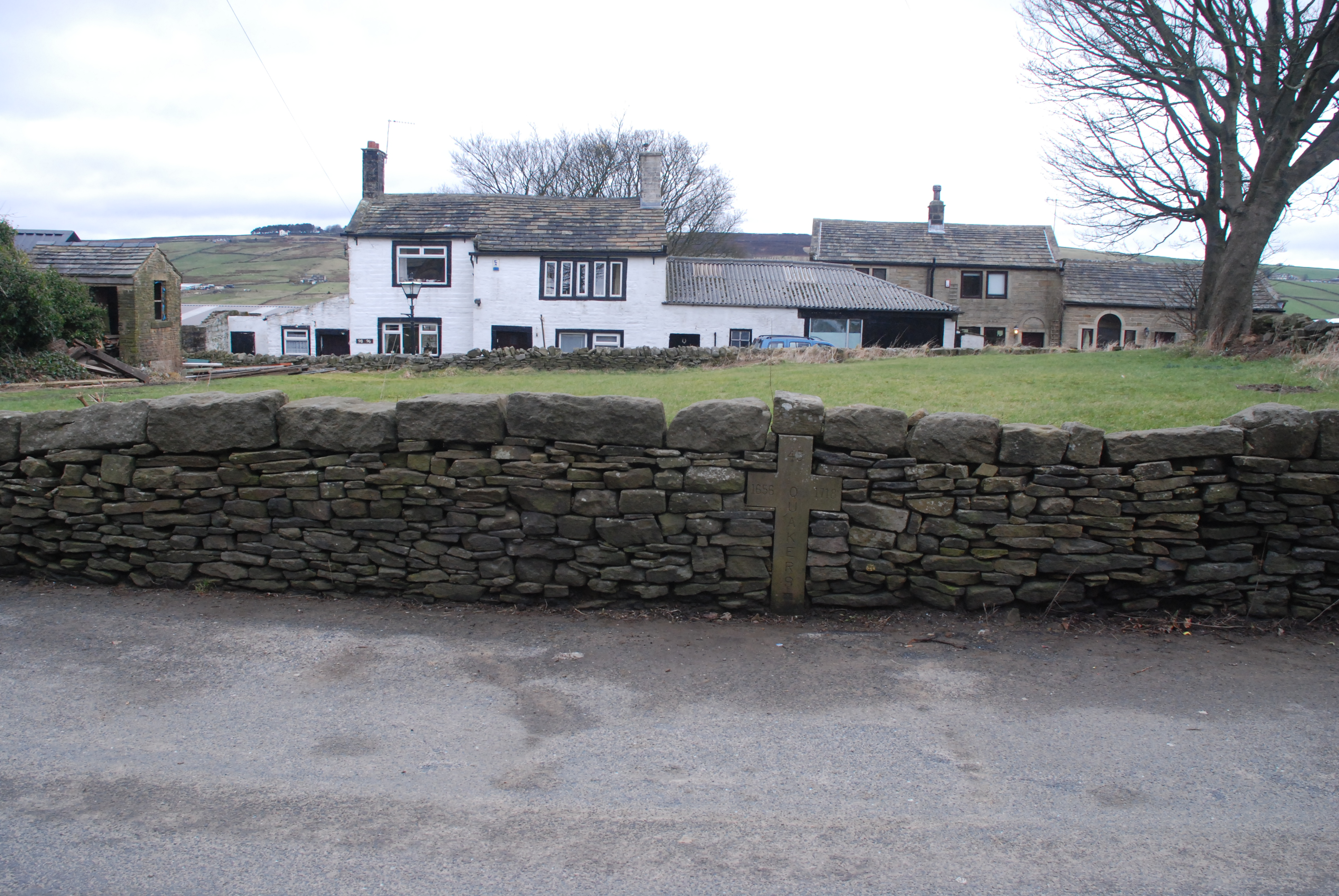
Main Street. Quaker Burial Ground.

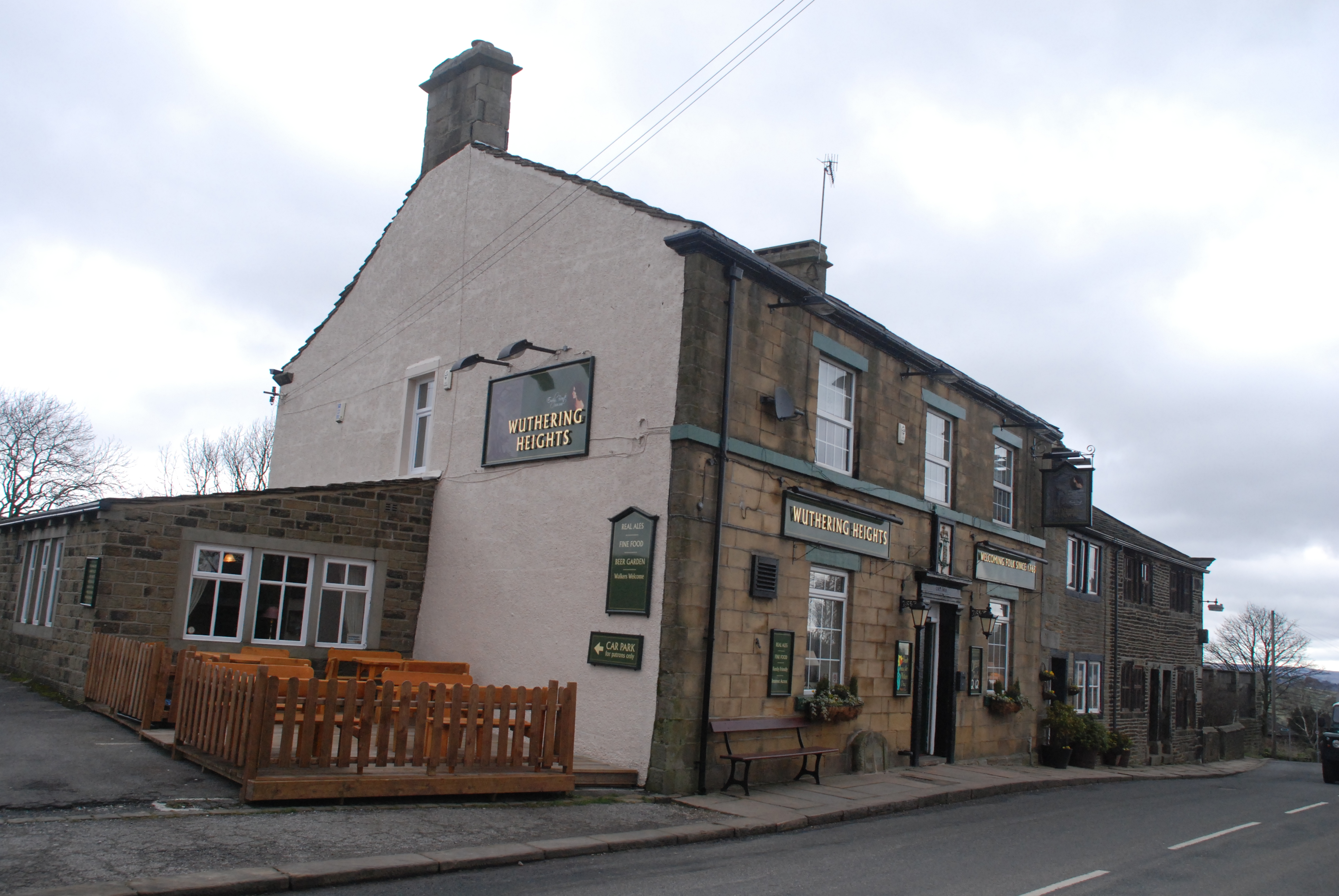
Main Street, Wuthering Heights PH.

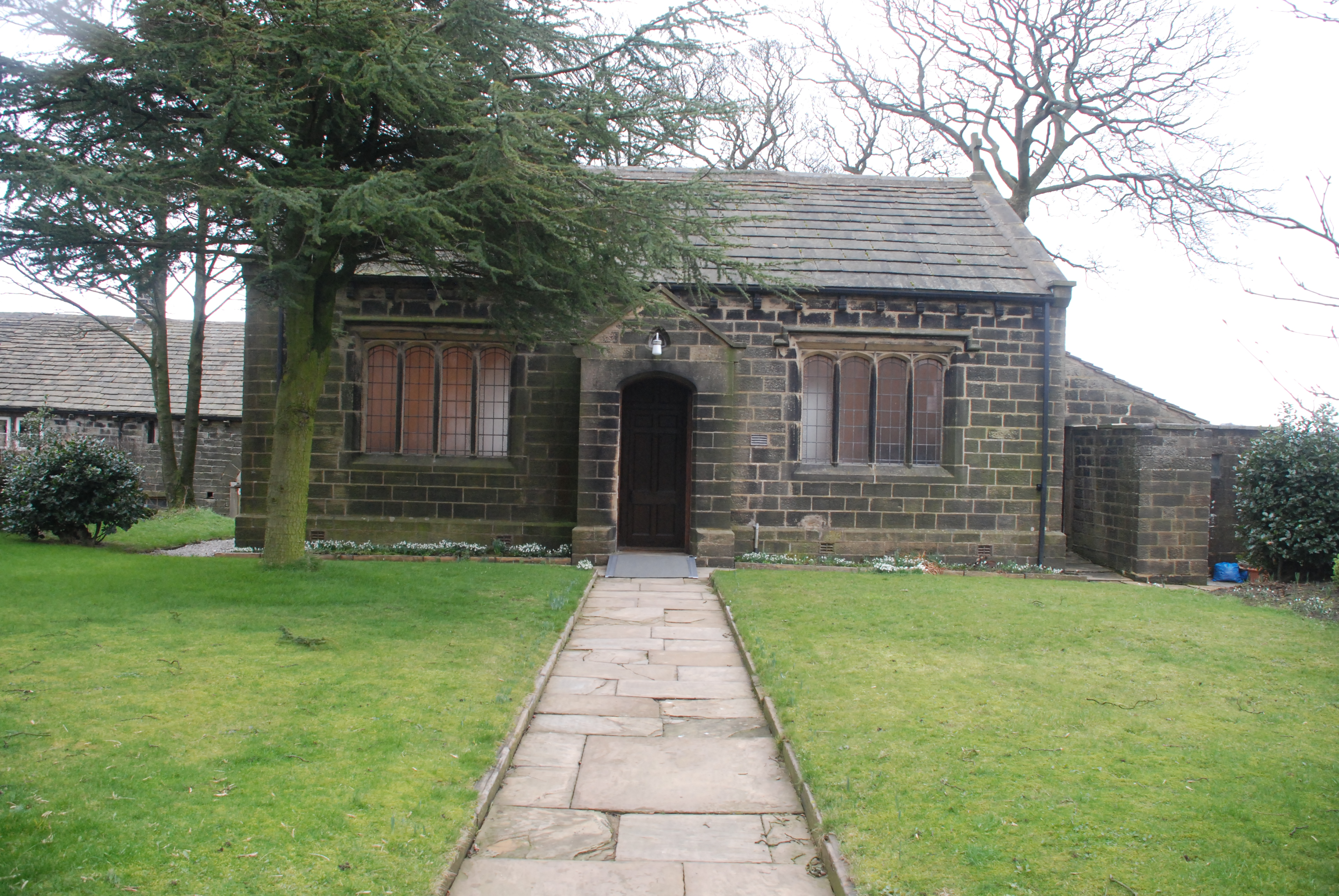
Main Street, St.Gabriel's Church.

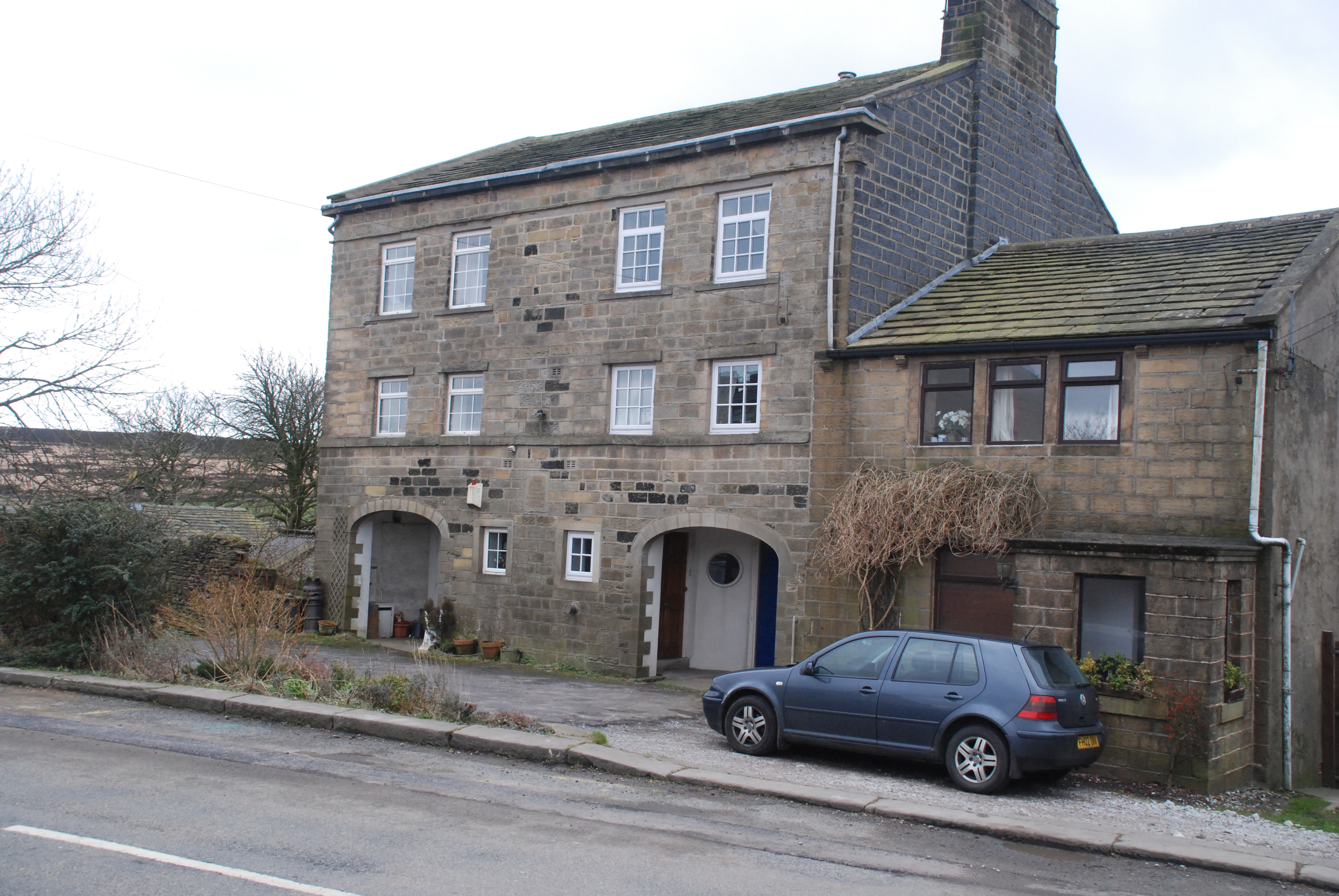
Main Street, former Methodist Chapel.

== See also ==
- Listed buildings in Haworth, Cross Roads and Stanbury
- Brontë Country
- Brontë waterfall
