= Top Withens =

Ruined farmhouse in West Yorkshire, England

Coordinates: 53°48′53″N 2°01′48″W

Top Withens (or Top Withins) is a ruined farmhouse near Haworth, West Yorkshire, England, notable for its association with Emily Bronte's 1847 novel Wuthering Heights. It occupies a remote and exposed position on Haworth Moor, 1,377 feet (420 metres) above sea level. The name comes from a dialect word meaning "willows".

A plaque affixed to a wall reads:

This farmhouse has been associated with "Wuthering Heights", the Earnshaw home in Emily Brontë's novel. The buildings, even when complete, bore no resemblance to the house she described, but the situation may have been in her mind when she wrote of the moorland setting of the Heights.

— Brontë Society 1964. This plaque has been placed here in response to many inquiries.

The popular misconception that Earnshaw's house was styled on Top Withens may have arisen from a series of letters between publisher George Smith and Charlotte Brontë's friend Ellen Nussey, as he sought a list of places that had inspired the novels.

The ruin is east of Withins Height below Delf Hill. It lies on two long-distance paths, the Brontë Way and the Pennine Way. It is a popular walking destination from nearby Haworth and Stanbury. Such is the attraction to Japanese literary tourists that some footpath signs in the area include Japanese text.

== Thunderstorm ==
On 18 May 1893, Top Withens was struck by lightning during a thunderstorm. Holes were made in the wall, the roof was partially torn off, flags were cracked, and around 30 windows were almost completely removed. A portion of slate was thrown far from the house by the wind, and in the kitchen the blade of a knife had been fused by the heat. A bowl of dough prepared by the farmer's wife, Mrs. Sunderland, was smashed to pieces, and her dog and cat fled the building in fear. This was reported by the Todmorden & District News the following week.

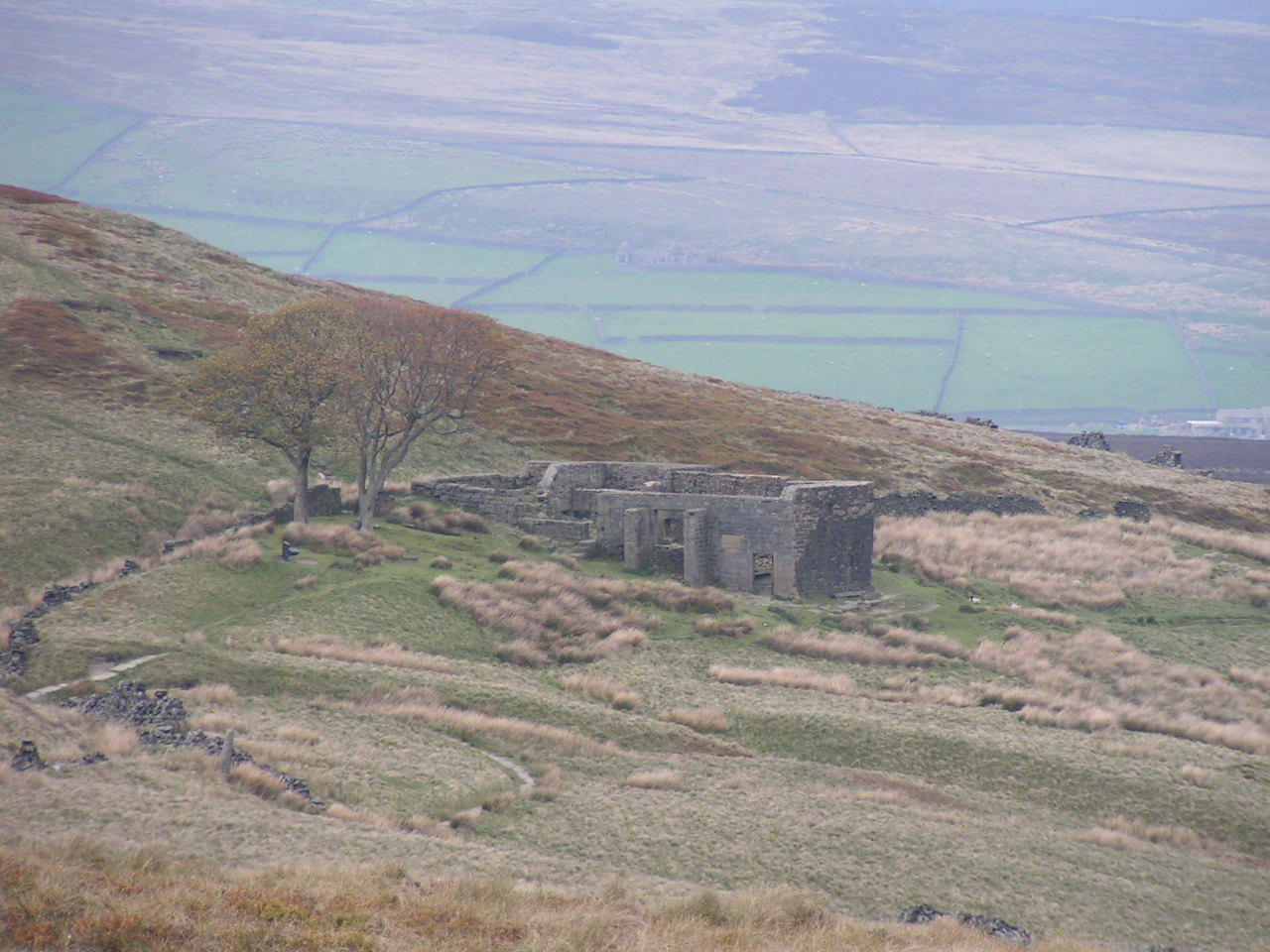
Top Withens from the south in 2005

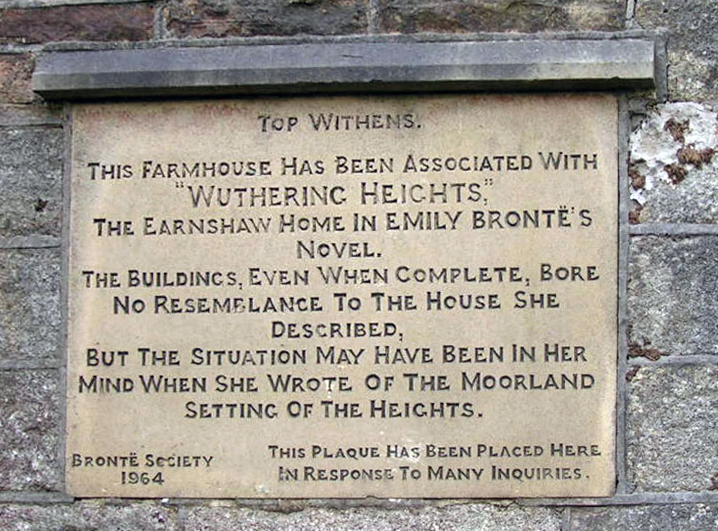
Brontë Society plaque at Top Withens

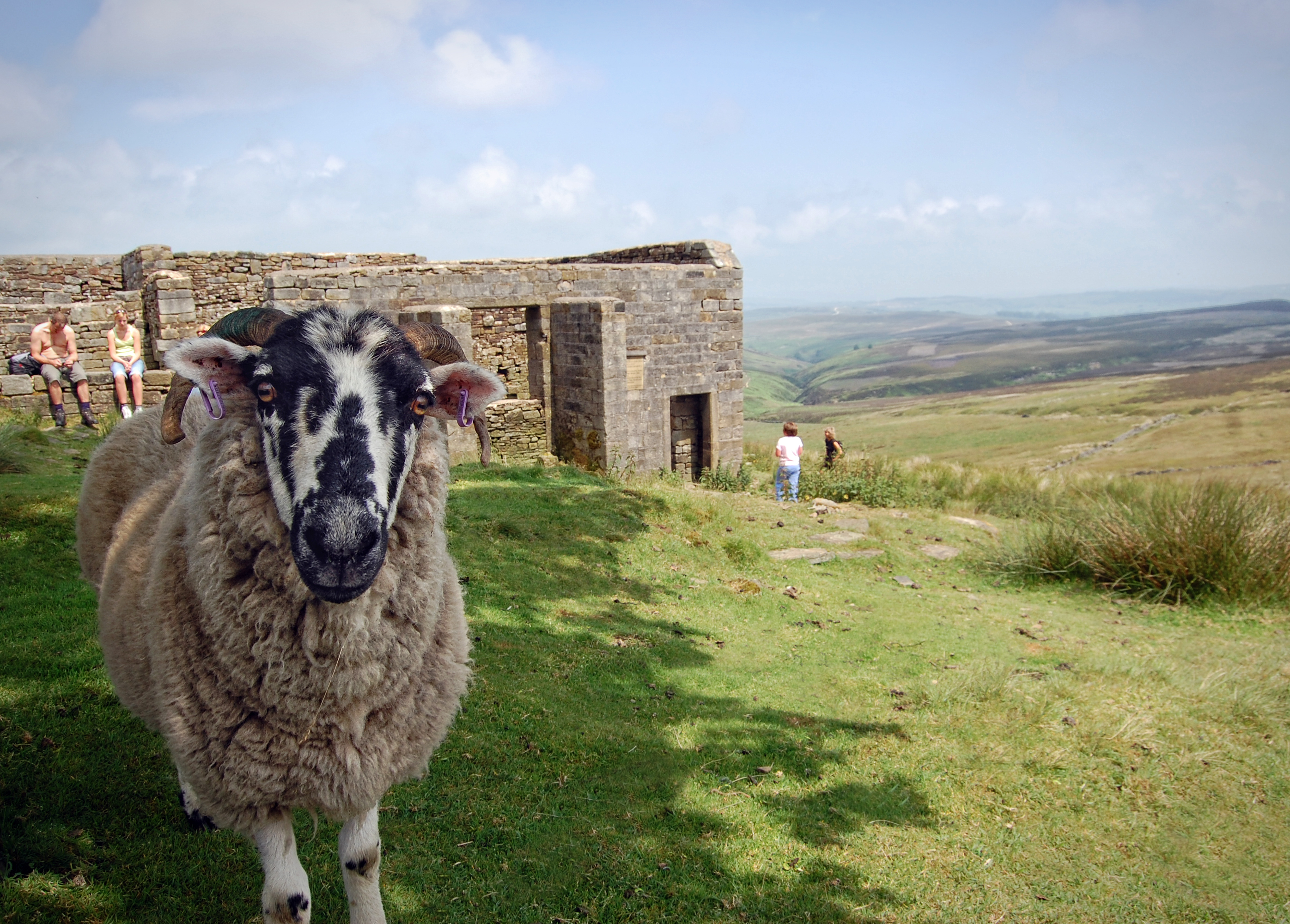
A moorland sheep in front of the derelict building

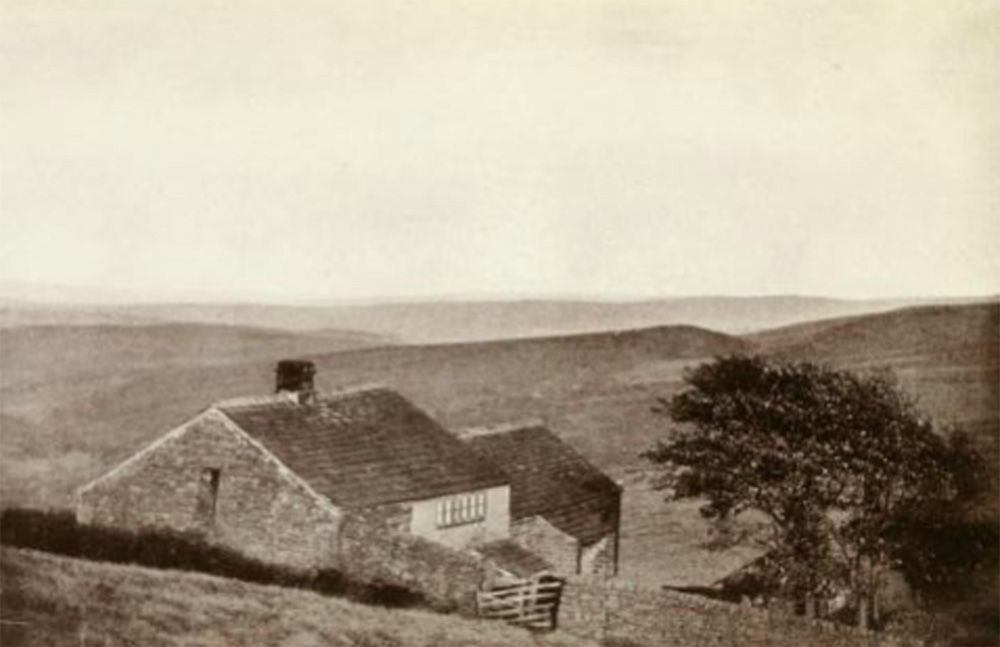
Top Withens circa 1900
