= Matthew Humberstone School =

Former secondary school in Cleethorpes, England

Humberstone Foundation School/Matthew Humberstone School

Location
- Chatsworth Place; Cleethorpes, North East Lincolnshire, DN35 9NF; England; 53.550078°N 0.048875°W

Information
- Type: Voluntary controlled school
- Motto: Striving for excellence
- Religious affiliation: Church of England
- Established: 1882
- Founder: Matthew Humberstone
- Closed: 2010
- Local authority: North East Lincolnshire
- Specialist: Business & Enterprise
- Department for Education URN: 118113 Tables
- Ofsted: Reports
- Head: Steve Cook
- Staff: Teaching: 84, Non-teaching: 37
- Gender: Coeducational
- Age: 11 to 16
- Enrolment: 1,254
- Colour: Royal blue
- Publication: Matthew Humberstone School Magazine
- +Special measures: 2007
- -Special Measures: 28 March 2008

Matthew Humberstone Church of England School, also known as the Matthew Humberstone School, Matthew Humberstone C of E School, Matthew Humberstone Comprehensive School, MHS and Matty, was a secondary school in Cleethorpes, North East Lincolnshire, England, with a Church of England tradition. It existed between 1973 until it was closed due to amalgamation in 2010.

The school was established as a comprehensive school in September 1973, later becoming a specialist Business and Enterprise College (BEC). It was the only Church of England secondary school in North East Lincolnshire, formed through the amalgamation of Beacon Hill Secondary School and Humberston(e) Foundation School.

The school remained in this form until September 2010, when it transformed into Saint Andrew's College (a joint church school), based at the Matthew Humberstone Upper site on Chatsworth Place. (St Andrew's College became the Holy Family Catholic Academy in September 2013, before closing in July 2017 and reopening as Beacon Academy, sponsored by the Wellspring Academy Trust.)

The Clee Grammar School buildings on Clee Road, which were occupied until closure in 2008 by Matthew Humberstone School, remained empty until 2017, when the process of transforming them into a primary school began. Demolition of blocks built in the 1950s and remodelling of the remainder created the Bursar Primary Academy, replacing the Bursar Primary School.

== History ==
=== Matthew Humberston ===
The original school was founded in 1823 by Matthew Humberston, born in Homerton, London in 1649, reputed to be a foundling. He became a London customs officer and becoming very wealthy, bought up land in Humberston. There he rebuilt the church and occupied a manor house where he died on a visit from London in 1709. In his will he left £1,000 to rebuild the church steeple and a gift of £500 to establish a Free Grammar School and almshouses, allowing £44 per year for the vicar to also act as headmaster of the school. Much legal wrangling followed of the will provisions and the £500 grew through investments to £24,867. This was used to build a school next to the vicarage at a cost of £700. It was opened in October 1823 with 105 boys on the list. Over 100 years had elapsed since the death of Matthew Humberstone.

The last headmaster of the old school was appointed in 1876. He was Dr John Morgan, vicar of Humberstone. The Charity Commissioners ordered the closure of the school and its transfer to a new site in Clee Road. The old school closed in 1878 and the sum of £13,022 was available for the building of the new school. It was ruled that future headmasters should not hold any benefice having "the care of souls".

=== Clee Grammar School ===
When it opened on Clee Road on 25 September 1882 it was an all-boys grammar school with only 15 students, which rose to 67, and known as the Clee Foundation School (although the area after which it was named was actually mostly in Grimsby). The Clee Grammar School for Boys (also known as the Clee Humberstone Foundation School and Old Clee Grammar School) was on the south side of Clee Road (then the A18, now the A46) in Old Clee, opposite Clee Crescent.

The school has also been referred to as simply the Matthew Humberstone Foundation School.

The first headmaster of the new school was Arthur Abbot, who resigned in 1900. He was followed by Edwin Lovegrove was headmaster until 1906, when he became head of Stamford School. T.R. Turnbull, who had been an assistant master at the school since 1894, was promoted to the headmastership.

In 1909, under Turnbull, the school buildings were considerably extended, enabling pupil numbers to rise to 212. Fees were increased in 1922 to £3 per term for boys under 12, with an additional 10 shillings for older boys. In 1923 Turnbull died and was succeeded by Stanley. F. Thomas, DSO, who gained for the school a reputation of strict discipline and high standards.

In the 1930s major extensions were again carried out, completed in June 1937, which included a large assembly hall and a science wing, allowing the school to accommodate 300 pupils; this number rose to 370 by 1953.

In 1951 the status of the school changed from "Aided School" to a school wholly controlled by Lindsey County Council. On the retirement of Thomas in 1953, C. Shaw was appointed headmaster.

In 1956 Ernest Kirman, chairman of the governors, provided funds towards the cost of the further buildings, including a swimming pool, new gymnasium and dining room. These new extensions were opened by the Bishop of Lincoln on 25 September 1958.

A "new block" was constructed to provide more teaching space in the early 1960s. The grammar school had fairly good reputation, and in 1964 almost 10% of the sixth form gained places at Oxford or Cambridge universities.

==== List of headmasters ====
1823 – 49 Rev. Joseph GEDGE, MA
1849 – 50 Rev. George Edwin PATTENDEN, MA, BN, LLD
1851 – 76 Rev. Charles WILDBORE
1876 – 78 Rev. John MORGAN, LLD, DCL
1882 – 1900 Mr Arthur ABBOTT, MA
1900 – 1906 Mr Edwin William LOVEGROVE, MA, MRIA, FSA
1906 – 1923 Mr Thomas Robert TURNBULL, BA, BSc (Royal University of Ireland)
1923 – 1953 Lt.-Col. Stanley F. THOMAS, DSO, BA
1953 – 1973 Mr Colin SHAW, MA (Cantab) (Last Head of Humberstone Foundation School) (Died 1988)
1973 – 1989 Mr Bernard BEACROFT BA (Head of Matthew Humberstone School)

Several references to life at the school under Colin SHAW as headmaster can be found in the book entitled 'Beyond the Final Whistle' by John Boyers, the chaplain of Manchester United FC., who was a geography master at the school.

==== Magazine, school song and badge ====
The school magazine of the grammar school was called The Humberstonian. There was a school song ("Some men boast of their ancient lineage, Humberstone none had he...") and the school's original Coat of Arms:- Argent three bars and in chief as many rondels ermines, boasted a Latin tag, "Fax mentis honestae gloria" (Glory is the beacon of a noble spirit).

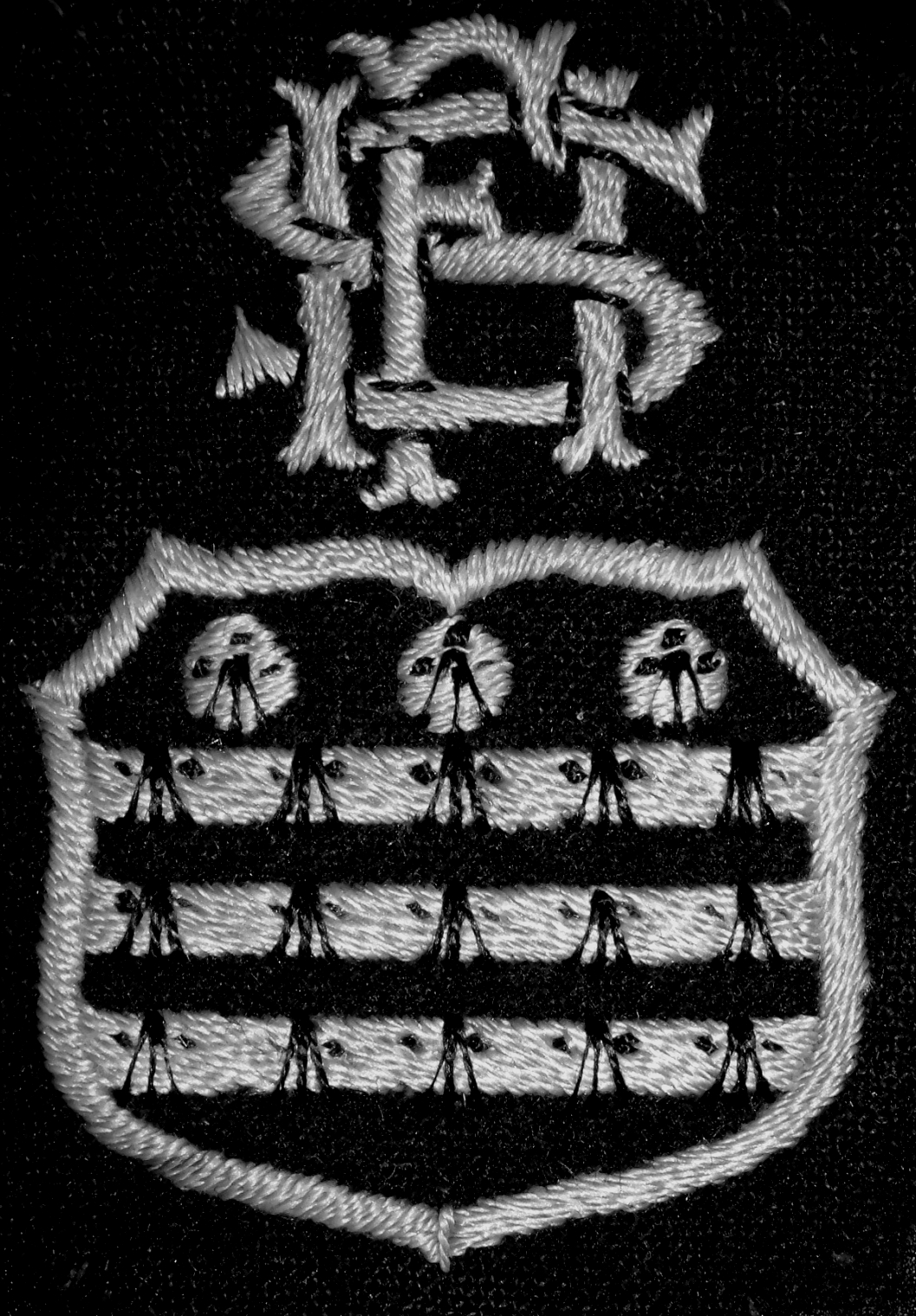
Humberstone Foundation School Blazer Badge

The school song was written by Mr. (Nag) W. Hubert Collins, M.A. a master at the school from the early 1920s. The music was written by Mr. Thomas Robert Turnbull, B.A., B.Sc. (Royal University of Ireland), headmaster 1906 to 1923. The score was published by Novello & Company.

=== Clee Grammar School uniform ===
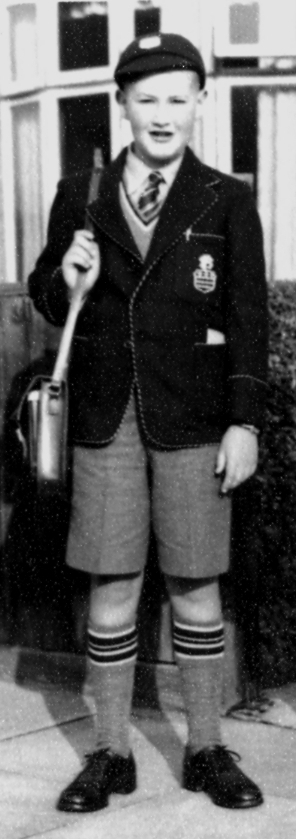
Eleven-year-old boy in uniform of Humberston Foundation School 1953

The following account relates to a new eleven-year-old's entrance to the school in 1953 and the instructions received by his parents:-

"Grammar School meant a new uniform and apparently lots of new rules. The letter dated June 1953 received from S. F. Thomas, headmaster, School House, Clee, enclosed several forms. These included an application form, a form of agreement, a dinner and milk form, and a health certificate form. Most had to be returned as soon as possible but the health certificate ‘should be brought by the boy on the first morning of term, which begins on Tuesday, 8 September, at 9.30am". The letter continued: "Your boy should be in possession of the following articles of clothing, all of which, with the exception of the boots and shoes, are supplied by the School Outfitters’ and there followed details of three local suppliers of school uniforms. The list included, school cap and tie, two football jerseys (one white and the other black-and-white striped), football shorts (black), football boots, gym singlet, gym shoes, towel, light slippers for wear in school (optional), school blazer, grey flannel trousers and white cricket shirt (compulsory). As all boys are required to change either into gym shoes or into light slippers on entering the School each day, these must be brought on the first morning of term.’ Other instructions in the letter required the marking of all clothing with the boy’s name, and that the boy should be provided with a copy of the Bible (Revised Version) and of Hymns Ancient and Modern."

The official school outfitters referred to in the headmaster's letter were Messrs. Atkinson Ltd of Old Market Place, Grimsby, Mr A. Burton, Sea View Street, Cleethorpes, or Messrs. G. Wilson & Son, High Street, Cleethorpes The cap and blazer were black. The cap and blazer were decorated with the school badge and the blazer edges were outlined with black and white piping. The tie was black with white diagonal stripes. During the 1950s, most eleven-year-olds were outfitted with short grey trousers and continued to wear these until the second or third form when outgrown shorts were replaced by 'longs'.

=== Other information ===
Highlights of the academic year were Sports Day, Founder's day and Speech Day. Competition was encouraged in the school and pupils were members of one of the four houses: Bolingbroke, Burleigh, Humberstone and Newton. Points were accumulated throughout the year for sporting and academic achievements, but lost through lateness and poor work, so that at the end of the year one house could claim to be Cock House!

Speech Day was held at a variety of venues such as the Theatre Royal, the ABC Cinema, the Empire Theatre and sometimes the school hall, with notable personalities presenting the prizes.

On Founders Day the school would attend a memorial service at Old Clee Parish church, an ancient building being the oldest in Grimsby dating back to Saxon times. This church, Holy Trinity and St Mary, served for many centuries as the parish church for the farming village of Clee and the fishing hamlets known as the Thorpes of Clee.

A service of remembrance was regularly held in the school hall on the date nearest 11 November. The headmaster would read a list of old boys who fell in the two world wars. At the back of the school hall two bronze memorial plaques recorded their names. (These plaques are now in Cleethorpes Town Hall).

Further east along Clee Road (the boundary at that point between Grimsby and Cleethorpes) was Cleethorpes Girls' Grammar School, later the site of the Lower School of The Lindsey School. However this school too is closed and has become a care home.

At the boys' grammar school, in the 1940s and 1950s, a chemistry teacher for seven years was Dr Albert Lammington Bettison, who had been a wartime atomic scientist. He drowned when walking and was cut off by the tide, aged 37 in October 1953, and his body was found by Cleethorpes police on the beach at North Cotes.

There were several other notable science teachers at the grammar school in the 50s and 60s, Joseph Gregory (Chemistry) and Brian Leatherbarrow (Biology) and "Dutch" Jones (physics).

Genesis played at the grammar school on 19 December 1970.

There was an old boys association – The Old Humberstonians Association – but this is no longer in existence. However a group of old boys organise an annual dinner for alumni at which the school song, "Gaudeamus Igitur", and "the Lincolnshire Poacher" are usually sung with great enthusiasm.

The Kirman Trust bears the name of Ernest Kirman Esq., M.B.E., J.P., who was chairman of the governors from 1939 until his death in 1964. Mr. Kirman was an old boy of the school and while a governor was responsible for a number of benefactions – the swimming pool, the scout hut, a hard tennis court and sixth form rooms in the garden of School House.

The Kirman Trust owned the school buildings opened in 1882. However the buildings were sold when the Bursar Primary Academy was being opened. The Kirman Trust funds a number of bursaries which continue to be awarded to promising scholars who have won places at university.

=== Comprehensive ===
Local government reforms in 1974 had as a consequence the demise of the Grammar School status of Humberstone Foundation School, and the Clee Road site and buildings were utilised for the newly created Lower Matthew Humberstone Comprehensive School, sharing the name with the Beacon Hill Secondary Modern School, in Chatsworth Place, which became the upper school. They merged in September 1973 to form a comprehensive school, known as the Matthew Humberstone Church of England School, or Matthew Humberstone Comprehensive School.

Being outside of the borough of Grimsby (by a few metres), it was controlled by the Lindsey County Council Education Committee, based in Lincoln. It had 1,750 boys and girls, with the headmaster being Mr D Johnston. Less than a year after it was formed, following the revision of county boundaries, it transferred to the administration of the Grimsby Division of Humberside County Council Education Committee. Another upheaval in administration took place when North East Lincolnshire unitary authority was created from the boroughs of Cleethorpes and Great Grimsby on 1 April 1996 on the abolition of Humberside.

In September 2006, the school began using Positive Discipline as its discipline system.

=== Special measures ===
In 2007, the school was placed in special measures by a team of school inspectors. They were taken out of special measures by a group of Her Majesty's School Inspectors on 28 March 2008. It received low results at GCSE and SATs – well under the English average.

=== Changes to both sites ===
The school used to be on two sites – the former secondary modern and grammar school, being separated by Davenport Drive. This was not of greatest benefit to school administration, and with falling numbers of pupils, the school's students all moved to the Upper School site at Chatsworth Place in September 2008.

There were plans to merge the school with St Mary's Catholic School on Wootton Road in Nunsthorpe (another low performing school) and have a joint school on the Upper School site at Chatsworth Place. This site was also next to St Joseph's RC Primary School on Philip Avenue.

A closing re-union event for former staff and students of the school was held on Saturday 17 July 2010.

=== End of Humberstone name 2010 ===
The original merger proposal involved knocking down many of the former buildings of the Clee Grammar School, on Clee Road, and building a new school on the site, with the intention of opening the new school in 2012, after which the Matthew Humberstone Upper Chatsworth Place buildings could be demolished.

This former plan was amended and a new "joint faith" school called Saint Andrew's College opened in September 2010, using the Upper site on Chatsworth Place. However the school was judged as "requires improvement" in a 2013 Ofsted inspection.

The school converted to academy status on 1 September 2013, sponsored by Nottingham Roman Catholic Diocesan Education Service; the Bishop of Nottingham, Bishop Malcolm McMahon, chose the name of the academy as Holy Family Catholic Academy. HFCA closed in July 2017, reopening as Beacon Academy, sponsored by the Wellspring Academy Trust.

The Clee Grammar School buildings on Clee Road remained empty after the 2008 closure. In 2013 the "new" school buildings were cancelled due to a change of government and the ending of the "Building Schools for the Future" initiative by the previous Government. This meant that the new school remained in the Chatsworth Place buildings.

=== Bursar Primary Academy ===
There had been a primary school on Bursar Street in existence 1902. In 2005 there was a threat to close the school in its entirety due to low primary numbers in Cleethorpes. Neighbours, parents and staff rallied and a case to keep the school open was heard by the council and the school remained open.

Gradually, the primary numbers in Cleethorpes and in areas around Grimsby grew, and were predicted to keep growing, creating pressure on many schools in the area. The school sat on a restricted site so it could not grow without additional space. After the closure of MHS in 2010, the local authority suggested to Bursar Primary Academy that a move to the Matthew Humberstone lower school site on Clee Road site would allow significant expansion. The Kirman Trust sold the 1882 buildings to the local authority.

In 2017, when the process of transforming the Clee Road buildings into a primary school began. Demolition of blocks built in the 1950s and remodelling of the remainder created the Bursar Primary Academy, replacing Bursar Primary School.

The buildings were significantly modified for the new use, while retaining much of the character of the old school.

The primary school opened in September 2018 on the site of what used to be Humberstone Foundation School with an initial capacity of 315 pupils.

Ofsted records the Bursar Primary School as being closed in 2010, and Bursar Primary Academy opened in August 2012, with conversion to Academy status on 12 August 2012. In its first full inspection, on 24 June 2014, it was ranked "Good".

== Awards ==
- The school was awarded the Learning and Skills beacon by the Department for Education and Skills.
- It was awarded the Basic Skills Agency award.
- It was an Investor in People.
- It was also an Investor in Careers.
- It received the technology colleges award.
- It was also awarded the Excellence and Diversity award.
- In August 2004, it received the International Award from the British Council.

== Notable former pupils and staff ==
=== Pupils ===
==== As Clee Grammar School for Boys ====
- Sir Jack Croft Baker Knighted 15 July 1958 for services to fishing.
- Phil Ball (writer)
- John Bowers KC, barrister and Principal of Brasenose College, Oxford
- John Broughton, (born Cleethorpes 1948), author
- John A. Conolly, (born Louth 1941), singer/songwriter "The Man from Fiddlers' Green
- Terry Donovan (footballer), father of Keeley Donovan
- Jimmy Fell, (4 January 1936 – 2 February 2011), footballer
- Harold Gosney, (born Sheffield 1937), artist and sculptor
- Jack D. Ives, (15 October 1931 - 15 September 2024) Professor of Geography and Environmental Studies at Carleton University, Ottawa.
- Roger Clifton Jennison, (18 December 1922 – 29 December 2006) Professor of Physical Electronics at the University of Kent.
- Abraham Lyons, Conservative MP from 1931 to 1945 for Leicester East
- John Maltby, (16 July 1936 – 22 December 2020), distinguished sculptor and studio potter.
- Edmund Marshall, (31 May 1940 – 5 October 2023), former Labour MP from 1971 to 1983 for Goole
- Nigel Martin, politician, mathematician and academic administrator
- Guy McCracken, (Born November 1948), Chairman Duchy Originals, Joint Managing Director of Marks & Spencer plc, CEO Co-op Food Retail, Chairman Branston Potato Suppliers
- Frank Reginald Nunes Nabarro MBE OMS FRS (7 March 1916 – 20 July 2006) was an English-born South African physicist and one of the pioneers of solid-state physics, which underpins much of 21st-century technology.
- Madsen Pirie, President of the Adam Smith Institute think tank.
- David Plastow (born Grimsby 9 May 1932), became an automobile executive. Chairman Rolls-Royce Motors 1972 – 1980.
- Edward Frank Shotter, Dean of Rochester from 1989 to 2003, and Director from 1974 to 1989 of the Institute of Medical Ethics
- John Sunley (10 October 1946 - 6 August 2009), was an English cricketer.
- John Tudor (8 February 1930 – 29 October 2009), distinguished Methodist minister.
- Richard Witts, professional musicologist, music historian, and former leader of 1980s group The Passage.
- John Derek Woollins Chemistry Professor Provost Khalifa University, Abu Dhabi; previously Vice principal, University of St Andrews

==== As Matthew Humberstone School ====
- Peter Bore, born 4 November 1987 at Grimsby, footballer
- Danielle Sharp (2002–07)
- Paul Robinson (born 1982) Contemporary Artist better known as LUAP

=== Staff ===
- Jonty Driver, writer and anti-apartheid activist, was Director of Sixth-Form Studies 1973–8, and wrote Patrick Duncan: South African and Pan-African while on a sabbatical from the school in 1976. He also wrote a book which included a memoir of his experiences at the school.

== First World War roll of honour ==
There was a roll of honour at the school commemorating the deaths of 42 past pupils of the school who died in the First World War, but after the closure of the school in 2010, it was put into storage at the offices of the North East Lincolnshire Council. As of November 2019 the roll of honour was still stored by the Council "with a view to being put on public display in a new town centre museum and heritage centre".

== See also ==
- Humberston Maths and Computing College, nearby to the south, and in North East Lincolnshire
- List of schools in North East Lincolnshire
