= Listed buildings in Haworth, Cross Roads and Stanbury =

Haworth, Cross Roads and Stanbury is a civil parish in the metropolitan borough of the City of Bradford, West Yorkshire, England. It contains 86 listed buildings that are recorded in the National Heritage List for England. Of these, one is listed at Grade I, the highest of the three grades, two are at Grade II*, the middle grade, and the others are at Grade II, the lowest grade. The parish contains the villages of Haworth, Cross Roads and Stanbury, and the surrounding countryside. Most of the listed buildings are houses, cottages and associated structures, farmhouses, farm buildings, and shops. Haworth has associations with the Brontë family who lived in Haworth Parsonage, which is listed at Grade I. The other listed buildings include churches, chapels and associated structures, textile mills, bridges, public houses, a milepost, a former school, a railway station, a war memorial and a memorial building, and three telephone kiosks.

== Key ==
Grade	Criteria
I	Buildings of exceptional interest, sometimes considered to be internationally important
II*	Particularly important buildings of more than special interest
II	Buildings of national importance and special interest

== Buildings ==
Name and location	Photograph	Date	Notes	Grade
St Michael's Church, Haworth; 53.83122°N 1.95604°W		16th century (probable)	The oldest part of the church is the tower, with the body being rebuilt in 1879–80. It is built in millstone grit with a roof of Westmorland slate, and consists of a nave with a clerestory, north and south aisles, a south porch, a chancel with a south chapel and a north organ chamber, and a southwest tower. The tower is in Perpendicular style, and has diagonal buttresses, a west window, clock faces, and an embattled parapet with crocketed pinnacles.	II*
Former farmhouse and outbuildings, east of Rush Isles Farm; 53.82997°N 2.00590°W	—	Early 17th century	The farmhouse and attached barn are in stone with quoins, a moulded band, and a stone slate roof with a coped gable and moulded kneelers. There are two storeys, the house has a rear wing, on the front is an inserted doorway, and the windows are mullioned. The barn to the right is recessed, and in the gable end is a doorway with a segmental-headed lintel.	II
Ponden Hall; 53.83015°N 2.01553°W		1634	A large house that was extended in 1801. It is in stone and has a stone slate roof with coping on the right, and two storeys. The windows in both parts are mullioned, those in the ground floor of the original part with hood moulds. The extension consists of one wide bay on the left. This contains a doorcase with Tuscan pilasters, a frieze, a cornice, and a pediment. Above it is a round-arched niche containing an inscription describing the dates of building the house.	II*
23 Haworth Road, Cross Roads; 53.83568°N 1.93569°W	—	17th century	The house, which was refronted in the 18th century, is in millstone grit, with quoins and a stone slate roof. There are two storeys, two bays, and a rear outshut. On the front is a central doorway with interrupted jambs and a gabled hood, the outshut contains a doorway with chamfered surround, and the windows are mullioned.	II
26 and 28 North Street, Haworth; 53.83285°N 1.95667°W		17th century	A house, later divided, it is in stone, with quoins, and a stone slate roof with a coped gable on the right. There are two storeys and a T-shaped plan, consisting of a three-bay hall range and a gabled cross-wing on the left. There is one single-light casement window, the other windows are mullioned with round-headed lights, and there is a continuous hood mould in the ground floor. In the cross-wing is a doorway with interrupted jambs, and at the rear is a doorway with a chamfered and quoined surround and a Tudor arched head, and a 20th-century gabled porch.	II
Far Coney Garth Farmhouse and barn 53.82847°N 2.00099°W	—	17th century	The farmhouse and barn, which were later extended, are in stone and have a stone slate roof with coped gables and kneelers, and two storeys. The house has doorways with plain surrounds and mullioned windows. In the barn to the left are doorways and windows, and at the rear is a large cart entry with a timber lintel.	II
Near Coney Garth Farmhouse; 53.82869°N 1.99958°W	—	17th century	The farmhouse, which was later extended to the left, is in stone with quoins, and a stone slate roof with a coped gable and shaped kneelers on the left. There are two storeys, and in the centre of the original part is a doorway with a chamfered quoined surround, plinth blocks and an ogee-moulded lintel. Above the doorway is an oculus, and the other windows are mullioned, with some mullions removed. In the extension is a doorway with interrupted jambs.	II
Bee-boles south of Ponden Hall; 53.82777°N 2.01529°W	—	17th century (possible)	The eight bee boles are in the angle of a field and are built into a slope. They are in stone with flat lintels and sills. Four of them face to the south, and four to the west.	II
Sowdens; 53.82728°N 1.96073°W	—	17th century	A farmhouse, later a cottage and outbuildings, it is in stone with a stone slate roof. There is one storey at the front and two at the rear, and the windows, some of which are blocked, are mullioned. In the left return is a porch with a coped gable and an opening with a moulded surround and a Tudor arched entrance. Inside are stone benches, and the inner doorway has a chamfered surround and a Tudor arched head.	II
The Old Hall; 53.82848°N 1.95359°W		17th century	A house, later a hotel, it is in stone with a moulded string course, shaped gutter brackets, and a stone slate roofwith coped gables, shaped kneelers, and finials. There are two storeys, four bays, and added bay to the left, and a rear wing. On the front is a gabled porch that has a segmental-arched doorway with voussoirs and moulded imposts. The inner doorway has a quoined surround and a Tudor arched head. Some windows have single lights, some are mullioned, some are mullioned and transomed, and some have hood moulds.	II
7 and 8 Fern Street, Haworth; 53.82774°N 1.95263°W	—	Late 17th century	A house that was converted in the 18th century, and has been divided. It is in millstone grit, with quoins, a stone slate roof, two storeys, and two bays. In the south front is a doorway with interrupted jambs, mullioned windows, and a datestone. The east front contains a doorway with a quoined and chamfered surround, a Tudor arched head, a deep lintel, and sunken spandrels.	II
Cook Gate Farmhouse; 53.83356°N 1.95662°W	—	Late 17th century	A rear wing and a single-storey extension were added later to the farmhouse. It is in millstone grit with quoins, shaped gutter brackets, and a stone slate roof with a coped gable on the right. The original part has two storeys and one bay. Three steps lead to a doorway with a quoined surround and a deep lintel, and the windows are mullioned with some mullions removed.	II
Brow Top Farmhouse; 53.83083°N 1.94041°W	—	1699	The farmhouse was later altered and extended, adding one bay at each end. It is in millstone grit, with quoins, and a stone slate roof with coped gables and shaped kneelers. There are two storeys, five bays, a projecting single-story outbuilding, and a cold store adjoining the southeast corner. The doorways have been inserted, in the centre is a roundel with the date and a cherub, the windows are mullioned, with some mullions removed, and over the windows in the middle three bays of the ground floor is a continuous hood mould.	II
Lower Slack; 53.82748°N 2.01492°W	—	Late 17th to early 18th century	Two houses and farm buildings in one range, they are in stone, with quoins, stone slate roofs, and two storeys. On the left is a house with an extension on its left, then a lower barn incorporated into the house, to the right of this is a cottage, and further to the right is a farm building converted for residential use. The building contains doorways and mullioned windows, with some mullions removed.	II
72 and 74 Main Street and barns, Stanbury; 53.82995°N 1.98801°W	—	1727	A pair of houses flanked by barns, No. 74 being the earliest, and the rest dating from later in the 18th century. The buildings are in millstone grit with quoins, shaped brackets, and coped gables with shaped kneelers. There are two storeys, and the houses have one bay each. The windows in the houses are mullioned, the doorway in No. 74 has a moulded surround and a dated lintel, and in No. 72 it has a plain surround and interrupted jambs. The barn on the left has a cart entry with a quoined surround and voussoirs, and a stable door with a moulded lintel and a window above. The barn to the right has a segmental-arched cart entry with voussoirs, and a projecting stone trough.	II
Font, St Michael's Churchyard; 53.83104°N 1.95593°W	—	1742	The font in the churchyard is in stone, and consists of a baluster on an octagonal plinth on a tomb slab. The bowl is inscribed on three sides and on the top.	II
Manor House, walls and gate piers, Haworth; 53.83350°N 1.95644°W	—	Mid-18th century	The house is in millstone grit on a chamfered plinth, with quoins, moulded gutters on consoles, and a stone slate roof with coped gables, kneelers and ball finials. There are two storeys and three bays. The central doorway has Tuscan pilasters, an entablature, and a triangular pediment, and the windows are sashes. The stone wall enclosing the garden is coped, the side walls are ramped with hemispherical finials, and the left wall contains a doorway. The front wall is about 0.75 metres (2 ft 6 in) high, with iron railings, some with urn finials. At the angles and flanking the gateway are square piers with ball finials, and the gates are in wrought iron.	II
Garden wall and piers, Ponden Hall; 53.82999°N 2.01528°W		18th century	The wall running along the front of the garden is in stone with coping. It is punctuated by six square rusticated piers, each on a plinth and with an ogee-moulded capstone and a pineapple finial.	II
Mounting block, Ponden Hall; 53.82996°N 2.01555°W	—	18th century or earlier	The mounting block is opposite the entrance to the hall, and is in stone. It consists of a double flight of five steps leading up to a platform.	II
West Lane Baptist Chapel; 53.83257°N 1.95864°W		1752	The chapel was extended in 1775 and rebuilt in 1844. It is built in millstone grit with a stone slate roof, two storeys, three bays in the front, and five along the sides. The front has a pedimented gable, a moulded eaves band, and a modillioned cornice, and in the tympanum is a datestone with a moulded surround. There are two doorways with Tuscan pilasters and cornices, and the windows have round-arched heads and voussoirs. On the sides are rusticated quoins, flat-headed sash windows in the ground floor, and round-headed sash windows in architraves with imposts and keystones in the upper floor. At the rear is a seven-bay single-storey extension, and beyond that a cross-wing.	II
Manor House, Stanbury; 53.83000°N 1.98504°W		1753	A stone house with quoins, a moulded string course, a moulded cornice, and a stone slate roof. There are two storeys, three bays, and a single-bay wing to the left. The central doorway has Tuscan pilasters, a frieze, and a pediment, and the windows are mullioned. Above the doorway is a round-arched datestone in an architrave with a keystone and imposts.	II
52 West Lane, Haworth; 53.83227°N 1.95815°W	—	1757	A house on a corner site that was rebuilt in 1883, it is in millstone grit with a stone slate roof, and has two storeys and a front of two bays. In the ground floor is a central doorway with a single-light window to the left and a three-light mullioned window to the right. The upper floor contains a two-light window to the left and a three -light window to the right, and between them is round-arched recess with a moulded surround containing a datestone.	II
6, 8 and 10 Lodge Street, Haworth; 53.83045°N 1.95508°W	—	Mid-to late 18th century	A group of cottages in millstone grit, with quoins, and a stone slate roof with coped gables, shaped kneelers and ball finials. There are three storeys and two bays. The doorways and windows have plain surrounds, some windows are mullioned, and others have single lights. On the right return, external steps with an iron baluster lead up to a doorway in the middle floor, and above it is a blocked door with projecting landing stone.	II
20, 22 and 24 Main Street, Stanbury; 53.82989°N 1.98515°W		Mid- to late 18th century	A row of three cottages in millstone grit, with quoins, and a stone slate roof with a coped gable on the right and a shaped kneeler. There are two storeys, and each cottage has one bay. The doorways and windows have plain surrounds, and the windows are mullioned.	II
Bridge House; 53.82860°N 1.94809°W		Mid- to late 18th century	A stone house with rusticated quoins, a moulded string course, a pulvinated frieze, an eaves cornice, and a stone slate roof with coped gables and shaped kneelers. There are two storeys and five bays. The central doorway has a moulded architrave with Ionic pilasters, a pulvinated frieze, a dentilled cornice and a pediment. The windows on the front are sashes in moulded architraves, and at the rear are mullioned windows and a tall round-arched staircase window.	II
Barn southeast of Bridge House; 53.82845°N 1.94778°W	—	Mid- to late 18th century	A barn and stabling that has been partly converted into cottages. It is in millstone grit with quoins, chamfered gutter brackets, and a stone slate roof with coped gables. There are five bays, the middle bay under a pedimented gable. In the centre is a round-arched cart entry with voussoirs, pilasters with bases and capitals, a frieze, and a cornice. In the tympanum is a Diocletian window and pigeon holes, and elsewhere are round-headed windows with keystones, impost blocks, and Y-tracery.	II
Lees Farm; 53.83585°N 1.93504°W	—	Mid- to late 18th century	A stone house on a chamfered plinth, with quoins, a band, a moulded eaves cornice, and a stone slate roof. There are two storeys and three bays. The central doorway has Tuscan pilasters, a frieze, a cornice, and a pediment, and above it is a round-arched window in an architrave with a moulded lintel, a keystone and impost blocks. The other windows are mullioned, and at the rear is a stair window.	II
6 and 8 Vale Lane Top, Haworth; 53.83561°N 1.93792°W	—	Late 18th century	A pair of houses in millstone grit, with quoins, and a stone slate roof with coped gables and shaped kneelers. There are two storeys, and each house has two bays. The openings have plain stone surrounds, and the windows are mullioned, with some lights blocked.	II
70 and 72 West Lane, Haworth; 53.83208°N 1.96177°W	—	Late 18th century	A house converted into two cottages in the 19th century, it is in millstone grit, with quoins, and a stone slate roof. There are two storeys and two bays. The doorway on the front has a plain surround and impost blocks, and in the right gable end is a doorway with interrupted jambs. The windows are mullioned.	II
Rush Isles Farmhouse and barn 53.82995°N 2.00718°W	—	Late 18th century	The farmhouse, which has been extended to the left, and the barn are in stone with stone slate roofs. The house has quoins and two storeys. The doorway has a fanlight, and the windows are mullioned, with some mullions removed. The barn is lower, and contains a central elliptical-headed cart entry with a chamfered quoined surround and voussoirs, two doorways, one converted into a window, and round-arched slit vents.	II
Haworth Parsonage; 53.83118°N 1.95723°W		1779	From 1820 the parsonage was home to the Brontë family, and since 1928 it has been a museum. The building, which was extended to the right in 1878, is in millstone grit, with quoins, dentilled eaves, and a stone slate roof. There are two storeys, the original part has five bays, and to the right is a cross-wing. In the centre of the original part is a doorway with Tuscan pilasters, a frieze, a cornice, and a pediment, and the windows are sashes in architraves with moulded sills. The windows in the cross-wing are similar, and on the gable is an iron finial.	I
Bridgehouse Mills; 53.82853°N 1.94863°W		c. 1790	The mill was extended by the addition of another block to the right in the mid-19th century. The blocks are in millstone grit, and both have four storeys and seven bays. The earlier block has quoins, and the middle bay projects slightly under a pediment containing an oculus. In the centre is a rusticated archway with a keystone mask, rusticated pilasters and a cornice. Above it is a stepped three-light window, and the top floor contains a Venetian window. To the right is a round-arched doorway, and the windows in the outer bays are sashes. The middle bay of the right block has an attic with a pediment and pilasters and it contains a round-arched window. In the southwest corner is a small turret with a flattened pyramidal roof.	II
84 Main Street, Haworth; 53.83132°N 1.95546°W		Late 18th to early 19th century	A shop in millstone grit on a plinth, with bands, a dentilled eaves cornice, and a stone slate roof. There are two storeys and three bays. In the ground floor are four Tuscan pilasters with panelled bases and capitals carrying an entablature, and containing a central doorway with a fanlight and a wooden pediment flanked by shop windows. In the upper floor are 20th-century windows.	II
87 and 89 Main Street and 7, 9 and 11 Lodge Street, Haworth; 53.83045°N 1.95484°W	—	Late 18th to early 19th century	A house and a shop with three cottages at the rear, they are in millstone grit with stone slate roofs. In Main Street, the buildings are on a plinth and have moulded gutter brackets, three storeys and five bays. No. 87 has a shop front in the ground floor, and No. 89 has a doorway, a large window to the left and a smaller window to the right. The upper floors contain single-light windows. At the rear the cottages have plain gutter brackets, one and two storeys, and an external flight of steps with an iron baluster leading up to a 20th-century door.	II
5, 7 and 9 North Street, Haworth; 53.83292°N 1.95548°W	—	Late 18th to early 19th century	A row of three cottages in millstone grit that have a stone slate roof with a coped gable and shaped kneelers on the right. There are two storeys, each cottage has one bay and at the rear is an outshut. Each cottage has a doorway with a plain surround and a three-light mullioned window to the right and in the upper floor.	II
Bridge, Ebor Mill; 53.83445°N 1.94653°W	—	Late 18th to early 19th century	The bridge carries Ebor Lane over Bridgehouse Beck. It is in millstone grit and consists of three segmental arches. The bridge has voussoirs, cutwaters, a coped parapet cantilevered on the north side, and a later pedestrian walkway cantilevered on the south side.	II
Bridge, Pondon Mill; 53.83121°N 2.00162°W	—	Late 18th to early 19th century	The bridge, to the east of the mill, carries Hob Lane over the River Worth. It is in millstone grit and consists of three segmental arches, the middle arch wider and taller. The bridge has triangular buttressed cutwaters and a chamfered coping to the parapet.	II
The Kings Arms Public House; 53.83160°N 1.95626°W		Late 18th to early 19th century	The public house, on a corner site, is in millstone grit with quoins, shaped gutter brackets, and a stone slate roof with coped gables and shaped kneelers. There are three storeys and two bays. The central doorway has an oblong fanlight, there are two two-light windows in each floor, and in the right return are two blind oculi.	II
Farmhouse and barn on The Slack; 53.82450°N 1.98057°W	—	Late 18th to early 19th century	The house and barn are in stone with quoins, and a stone slate roof with a coped gable and shaped kneeler on the left. The house has two storeys, a gabled porch, a doorway with a plain surround, and mullioned windows, with some mullions missing. The barn attached to the left is lower and contains a small central opening with a triangular canopy, a small window above, and round-arched vents.	II
Milepost opposite petrol station 53.83886°N 1.92829°W		c. 1805	The milepost is on the southeast side of Halifax Road (A629 road). It is in cast iron and has a triangular plan and a rounded top. On the top is inscribed "KEIGHLEY & HALIFAX ROAD" and "BINGLEY" and on the sides are the distances to Denholme, Halifax, Hebden Bridge and Keighley.	II
Steps, gate piers, gates and railings, St Michael's Church, Haworth; 53.83131°N 1.95581°W		1824	A flight of seven steps, flanked by low coped walls, leads up to a main gate, with a narrow gate on the right and a kissing gate on the left. There are three stone channelled and rusticated gate piers with plinths, ogee-shaped capstones, and fir cone finials, and a smaller gate pier to the left. The gates and railings are in cast and wrought iron, and there is a round-arched overthrow above the main gateway.	II
Hall Green Baptist Chapel; 53.82846°N 1.95293°W		1824–25	The chapel is in stone with a coped stone slate roof, two storeys and a basement. On the front are five bays under a pedimented gable, along the sides are three bays, and there is a rear extension. A flight of steps with iron balustrades lead up to a platform in front of the two round-headed doorways that have impost blocks and keystones. The windows on the front have round-arched heads and voussoirs, and along the sides the ground floor windows have flat heads, and those in the upper floor have round-arched heads. In the tympanum of the pediment is a round datestone in an architrave with a keystone. In the rear wall is a sundial.	II
8, 10, 11, 12 and 13 Belle Isle Road, Haworth; 53.83062°N 1.94977°W	—	Early 19th century	A group of five cottages in millstone grit, with quoins and a stone slate roof. Some cottages have three storeys, the others have two, and each has one bay. Most of the windows are mullioned, some mullions have been removed, and a bow window has been inserted.	II
13 and 15 Main Street, Haworth; 53.82894°N 1.95379°W		Early 19th century	A pair of mirror-image shops in a row, they are in gritstone with moulded gutter brackets and a stone slate roof. There are three storeys, and each shop has one bay. In the ground floor are shop windows flanked by doorways with plain surrounds, and the upper floors contain three-light mullioned windows.	II
29, 31 and 33 Main Street, Haworth; 53.82937°N 1.95424°W	—	Early 19th century	A row of three cottages in a terrace, they are in millstone grit, and have a stone slate roof. There are two storeys, and each house has one bay. The doorways are to the right, and there is a two-light mullioned window in both floors of each cottage.	II
32, 36 and 38 Main Street, Haworth; 53.83038°N 1.95453°W		Early 19th century	A row of two houses and a shop at the end of a terrace. They are in millstone grit on a plinth, with quoins and two storeys. The roof is in stone slate and has a coped gable and shaped kneeler on the left. Each building has a three-light mullioned window in the upper floor. In the ground floor, No. 32 has a central doorway flanked by single-light windows, and to the right is a passageway. No. 36 has a doorway with a single-light window to the right, and No. 38 has a shop window and a doorway to the right.	II
4, 6, 8 and 10 Shirley Street and 21, 25, 29 and 33 West Lane, Haworth; 53.83201°N 1.95724°W	—	Early 19th century	A group of back to back houses in millstone grit, with paired gutter brackets, and a stone slate roof. There are two storeys, with cellars on West Lane, and each house has one bay. The doorways and the windows, which are mullioned, have plain surrounds. On West Lane, steps lead down to the cellars, and steps with iron balustrades lead up to the doorways.	II
64, 66 and 70 Main Street, Stanbury; 53.82984°N 1.98719°W	—	Early 19th century	A house and an attached cottage to the left in millstone grit with shaped gutter brackets, and a stone slate roof with coped gables and shaped kneelers. There are two storeys and attics, the house has three bays and the cottage has two. In the house is a central doorway with an architrave and a cornice, and in the cottage the original doorway is blocked and a later doorway has been inserted. Some of the windows have single lights, others are mullioned, and in the gable ends are Venetian windows.	II
Bar House; 53.83589°N 1.94912°W		Early 19th century	Originally an estate house, it is in stone with a stone slate roof. There are two storeys, and the building has a polygonal front. In the middle face is a doorway, above which is an inscribed plaque dated 1843. Each of the other faces contains a small-paned casement window in both floors.	II
Old Silent Inn; 53.83025°N 1.99747°W		Early 19th century	The public house is in millstone grit, with quoins and a stone slate roof. There are two storeys, and an L-shaped plan, consisting of a main range and a later cross-wing. The main range contains three-light stepped mullioned windows. In the cross-wing is a porch, a two-light mullioned window, and single-light windows in the upper floor.	II
The Black Bull Hotel and water trough 53.83117°N 1.95565°W		Early 19th century	The public house is in millstone grit, with shaped gutter brackets, and a hipped stone slate roof. There are two storeys and three bays. In the centre is a gabled porch and a doorway with pilasters, a fanlight and a cornice. The windows are sashes, and in the left return is a round-headed staircase window. To the left of the doorway is a water trough hollowed out of a single boulder.	II
Oldest part, Vale Mills; 53.84052°N 1.94479°W		Early 19th century	The oldest part of the textile mill is in millstone grit and has a roof of Westmorland slate with coped gables. There is a T-shaped plan, the main range with three storeys and an office block at the south end, and the other ranges with two storeys. The main range spans Mytholmes Lane with a quoined shouldered arch, and the River Worth with a segmental arch that has rusticated voussoirs and spandrels. The blocks contain small-paned windows with stone lintels and continuous sill bands.	II
Caretakers House, West Lane Methodist Church; 53.83248°N 1.95932°W	—	Early 19th century	A stone house with quoins and a stone slate roof. There are two storeys and two bays. The doorway has a plain surround, and the windows are mullioned, with some mullions removed.	II
Woodlands; 53.82473°N 1.94946°W	—	Early 19th century	A stone house with a moulded cornice and a hipped stone slate roof. There are two storeys, a square plan, and a symmetrical front of three bays. Steps lead up to a central portico with two Tuscan columns, pilasters, a plain frieze and a cornice. The windows are sashes; in the ground floor they are tripartite with segmental heads, and the middle window in the upper floor has a moulded surround.	II
Ebor House; 53.83344°N 1.94617°W	—	1829	The house was extended by one bay at both ends later in the 19th century. It is in stone and has a stone slate roof with coped gables. There are two storeys, and five bays, the middle bay projecting, and the outer bays recessed. In the centre is a doorway with panelled jambs, and a lintel under a frieze and a pediment. The windows in the middle three bays are sashes, and in the outer bays they have round-arched heads, keystones and impost blocks.	II
National School; 53.83132°N 1.95675°W		1832	Originally a Sunday school, it was extended in 1851 and in 1871, and since 1903 has been used for other purposes. It is in stone with a stone slate roof and one storey. The earliest part, to the right, has a gabled porch with a Tudor arched entrance and a date plaque. There are two windows with pointed arches and voussoirs to the right, and three to the left. To the left of these are two gabled bays, each with a mullioned and transomed window with a hood mould, and between them is a Tudor arched entrance with a hood mould and quoins. Above the entrance is a raised square pediment with a carved blank shield. In the left return are four mullioned and transomed windows with hood moulds.	II
4–8 Ebor Lane, Haworth; 53.83426°N 1.94598°W		Early to mid-19th century	A terrace of five cottages stepped up a hill. They are in millstone grit, and have stone slate roofs with a coped gable on the left. Each cottage has a doorway on the left, and a three-light mullioned window in both floors.	II
15, 17 and 19 Haworth Road, Cross Roads; 53.83540°N 1.93727°W	—	Early to mid-19th century	A row of cottages in millstone grit, with a stone slate roof, two storeys and four bays. Most of the windows are mullioned, some mullions have been removed, and one bow window has been inserted.	II
25 and 27 Main Street, Haworth; 53.82918°N 1.95407°W		Early to mid-19th century	A pair of shops in millstone grit, with sill bands, plain gutter brackets, and a stone slate roof. There are three storeys, and each shop has one bay. The windows are mullioned, in the top floor is s taking-in door, and above the left doorway is an iron sundial.	II
28, 30 and 34 Main Street, Haworth; 53.83030°N 1.95446°W	—	Early to mid-19th century	A row of three houses in a terrace, they are in millstone grit, and have a stone slate roof with a coped gable and shaped kneeler on the right. There are three storeys, and each house has one bay. In the ground floor is a doorway on the left and a two-light mullioned window on the right, and the upper floors contain a three-light window in each house on both floors.	II
66 Main Street, Haworth; 53.83092°N 1.95513°W		Early to mid-19th century	A house in millstone grit with a stone slate roof and two storeys. In the ground floor is a doorway flanked by shop windows, and to the left is a passage entry. The upper floor contains two mullioned windows, one with two lights and the other with three.	II
68 Main Street, Haworth; 53.83102°N 1.95518°W		Early to mid-19th century	A shop in millstone grit, with plain gutter brackets and a stone slate roof, two storeys and one bay. In the ground floor is a central doorway with a fanlight, flanked by shop windows, and the upper floor contains a three-light mullioned window.	II
70 Main Street, Haworth; 53.83106°N 1.95524°W		Early to mid-19th century	A shop in millstone grit, with plain gutter brackets and a stone slate roof, two storeys and one bay. In the ground floor, two steps lead up to a doorway with a fanlight on the right, and to the left is a shop window. The upper floor contains a three-light mullioned window.	II
72 Main Street, Haworth; 53.83111°N 1.95529°W	—	Early to mid-19th century	A shop in millstone grit, with a stone slate roof, two storeys and one bay. In the ground floor is a central doorway flanked by shop windows, and the upper floor contains a three-light mullioned window.	II
78 and 80 Main Street, Haworth; 53.83121°N 1.95544°W		Early to mid-19th century	A house and a shop, previously three dwellings, two of them back to back. They are in millstone grit with gutter brackets, mostly paired, and a stone slate roof. The right part has three storeys and two bays, and the left part, which is slightly angled, has two storeys and one bay. In the ground floor of the left part is a segmental-headed cart arch with voussoirs and impost blocks, and an entry to No. 80. In the right end of the right part is a doorway with a plain surround, and the windows in both parts are mullioned.	II
Plaque, Ebor House; 53.83326°N 1.94622°W		1843	The plaque is incorporated into the garden wall of the house at a road junction. It is in stone and is inscribed with a notice that it is the entrance to a private road.	II
Stanbury Church; 53.82985°N 1.98774°W		1848	A small church in millstone grit on a chamfered plinth, that has a stone slate roof with coped gables and kneelers. There is one storey and two bays. In the centre is gabled porch that has a doorway with a shaped lintel. This is flanked by four-light mullioned windows with segment-arched lights, quoined jambs, and hood moulds. On the left gable is a bellcote, and on the right gable is a stone cross.	II
54 Main Street, Haworth; 53.83073°N 1.95493°W		Mid 19th century	A shop in millstone grit on a plinth, with dentilled eaves and a stone slate roof. There are two storeys and two bays. In the ground floor are three pilasters and an entablature containing a doorway to the left and a three-light shop window to the right. In the upper floor are two single-light windows.	II
69 and 71 Main Street, Haworth; 53.83002°N 1.95454°W		Mid 19th century	A pair of shops in millstone grit on a plinth, with an eaves cornice and a stone slate roof. There are three storeys, and each shop has two bays. In the ground floor, the left shop has a central doorway flanked by shop windows, and in the other shop the doorway is on the right, with two windows to the left; both doorways have a segmental-arch and a fanlight. In the upper floors are segmental-arched windows with architraves, those in the top floor also with moulded archivolts, keyblocks, and imposts.	II
74 Main Street, Haworth; 53.83114°N 1.95534°W		Mid 19th century	A shop in millstone grit with moulded gutter brackets and a stone slate roof. There are three storeys and two bays. In the ground floor is a doorway with a fanlight flanked by shop bay windows, with a cornice and wooden board above. The upper floors contain sash windows with plain surrounds.	II
76 Main Street, Haworth; 53.83118°N 1.95537°W	—	Mid 19th century	A pair of back to back cottages, later a shop, it is in millstone grit, with plain gutter brackets and a stone slate roof. There are three storeys and one bay. In the ground floor is a doorway with a fanlight, and to the right is a shop window. The other windows are mullioned, and at the rear is a blocked taking-in door in the top floor.	II
82 Main Street, Haworth; 53.83126°N 1.95546°W	—	Mid 19th century	A shop in millstone grit, with dentilled eaves and a stone slate roof. There are three storeys and two bays. The ground floor has rusticated pilasters at the sides, with bases and capitals, carrying an entablature, and a wooden cornice. This contains a doorway and a shop window to the left, and in the upper floors are sash windows.	II
101, 103 and 105 Main Street, Haworth; 53.83077°N 1.95515°W	—	Mid 19th century	A row of three cottages, partly used later for other purposes, in gritstone, with a stone slate roof and two storeys. The doorways and windows have plain surrounds; the doorway of No. 101 has a fanlight, and the other doorways are paired with a shared central jamb. There is a shop window, a single-light window, and the other windows are mullioned with three lights.	II
The Fleece Public House; 53.82988°N 1.95450°W		Mid 19th century	A public house and cottage, later combined, the building is in millstone grit with shaped gutter brackets and a stone slate roof. There are two storeys and four bays. The doorways have plain surrounds, the right doorway has a fanlight, some of the windows are mullioned, and the others have single lights.	II
75 and 77 Main Street, Haworth; 53.83013°N 1.95462°W	—	1854	A pair of shops in stone, with a sill band, stepped modillioned eaves, and a stone slate roof, There are two storeys, and each shop has two bays. In the ground floor are pilasters flanking the doorways and at the ends, carrying an entablature with a dentilled cornice. Each shop has a doorway to the right and a shop window to the left, the window in the left shop being a bow window. The upper floor contains a central datestone and 20th-century windows.	II
Haworth railway station 53.83119°N 1.94879°W		1867	The station was extended to the right in 1883, and now serves the Keighley and Worth Valley Railway. It is in stone, with a grey slate roof, a single storey, and a main range of four bays, the first and third bays gabled. The left two bays are on a plinth, with a moulded impost band, and a dentilled cornice. The openings, including the doorway in the second bay, have round-arched openings with moulded archivolts, keystones and impost blocks. In the third bay is a central round-arched window flanked by flat-headed windows, and above are corbelled bargeboards. To the left a lower block joins the station building to a porter's room.	II
Methodist Church, Lees; 53.83491°N 1.93630°W		1873	Originally a Sunday school, the church is in millstone grit with a stone slate roof. There is one storey, a front of six bays, sides of three bays, and a rear wing. The middle two bays on the front project under a pediment surmounted by a bellcote. The windows are round-headed with voussoirs, and the two central windows have archivolts, keystones, and moulded impost bands. Above the central windows is an inscribed band, and in the left gable end is a clock in an architrave.	II
St James' Church, Cross Roads; 53.83514°N 1.93414°W		1909–10	A church in Perpendicular style, it is built in stone with a slate roof. The church consists of a nave with a clerestory, north and south aisles, a north porch forming the base of an intended tower, and a chancel with an organ chamber and vestry. On the west gable is a bellcote, and on the other gables are cross finials. The east and west windows each has five lights.	II
Lees, Cross Roads and Bocking Memorial Building; 53.83603°N 1.93194°W		1921	This was constructed as a combined park pavilion and a war memorial in Arts and Crafts style. It is in gritstone and has a hipped roof of Welsh slate with terracotta ridge tiles. There is one storey and three bays. The front has canted corners, and in the centre is a bow window with a semi-conical roof. The doorways are on the sides, and the windows are casements.	II
Haworth War Memorial; 53.82898°N 1.94840°W	—	1923	The war memorial stands in a small enclosed area by a roundabout. It is in granite, and consists of a tapering obelisk with a pyramidal cap, on a plinth, on a pedestal, on a base of two steps. On the front is a bronze sword above a bronze wreath, and above them, on all faces, is a lettered frieze. On the pedestal are tablets with inscriptions and the names of those lost in the First World War.	II
Telephone kiosk, Sun Street; 53.82865°N 1.95338°W	—	1935	The telephone kiosk at a road junction is of the K6 type, designed by Giles Gilbert Scott. Constructed in cast iron with a square plan and a dome, it has unperforated crowns in the top panels.	II
Telephone kiosk, Haworth railway station 53.83132°N 1.94852°W		1935	The telephone kiosk outside the station is of the K6 type, designed by Giles Gilbert Scott. Constructed in cast iron with a square plan and a dome, it has unperforated crowns in the top panels.	II
Telephone kiosk, Main Street; 53.83135°N 1.95579°W		1935	The telephone kiosk by the church steps is of the K6 type, designed by Giles Gilbert Scott. Constructed in cast iron with a square plan and a dome, it has unperforated crowns in the top panels.	II
Bronte Footbridge; 53.81881°N 2.00407°W		Unknown	The bridge carries a footpath over Slade Beck. It consists of a large flagstone on two piers corbelled towards each other.	II
Long Bridge; 53.83434°N 1.97044°W		Unknown	A packhorse bridge over the River Worth, it is in stone, and consists of a single arch with a span of about 9 metres (30 ft). The parapets are about 0.6 metres (2 ft 0 in) high in the centre, and the bridge is approached by steps from each end.	II
