= Cross Roads, West Yorkshire =

Village in West Yorkshire, England

Coordinates: 53.836625°N 1.930765°W

Cross Roads
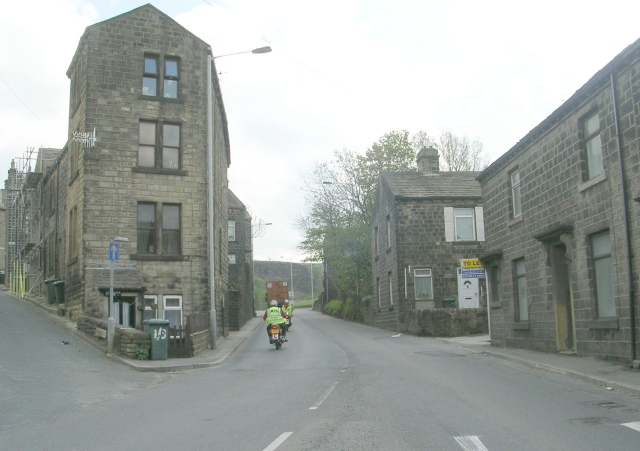
- Looking south with the A629 between the two buildings

- Location within West Yorkshire
- Population: 3,500
- OS grid reference: SE 0465 3782
  - London: 180 mi (290 km) SSE
- Civil parish: Cross Roads
- Metropolitan borough: City of Bradford
- Metropolitan county: West Yorkshire
- Region: Yorkshire and the Humber
- Country: England
- Sovereign state: United Kingdom
- Post town: KEIGHLEY
- Postcode district: BD22
- Dialling code: 01535
- Police: West Yorkshire
- Fire: West Yorkshire
- Ambulance: Yorkshire
- UK Parliament: Keighley

Cross Roads or Cross Roads with Lees or Cross Roads cum Lees is a village and civil parish within the City of Bradford Metropolitan District, West Yorkshire, England. Historically part of the West Riding of Yorkshire, it lies less than 1 mile (1.6 km) from Haworth, approximately 2.5 miles (4 km) from Keighley and approximately 9 miles (14 km) from Bradford.

== Geography ==
Cross Roads is named after the crossroads junction which leads in the directions of Haworth, Keighley and Denholme.

The village of Cross Roads with Lees is not necessarily a village, but is a collection of small hamlets which are today regarded collectively as a village. Within the village boundaries are 'Lees', 'Barcroft', 'Bocking', 'Bingley Road' and 'Cross Roads'.

Halifax Road which runs through the village, is part of the A629 road.

== Governance ==
From 1895 until 1938, Cross Roads was part of Haworth Urban District Council. Following abolishment of Haworth Urban District Council in 1938, Cross Roads joined Haworth in Keighley Borough Council. Cross Roads remained within Keighley Borough Council until changes caused by the Local Government Act in 1974 resulted in the abolishment of Keighley Borough Council with Cross Roads and all other areas previously within Keighley Borough Council being transferred into Bradford Metropolitan District Council. Since 1974, Cross Roads has been represented within the Worth Valley Ward of Bradford Metropolitan District Council.

On 1 April 1999, Cross Roads has been represented within the civil parish of Haworth, Cross Roads and Stanbury. On 1 April 2023 Haworth, Cross Roads and Stanbury was abolished and split and Cross Roads became a parish in its own right.

The village is represented in the Keighley and Ilkley Constituency of UK Parliament.

== Education ==
Lees Primary School is within the village and teaches children between the ages of 3 and 11.

The closest secondary schools are Parkside School in Cullingworth and Beckfoot Oakbank near Keighley. Both secondary schools are within 2.5 miles (4 km) of the village.

== Transport ==
In comparison with many nearby villages, Cross Roads can be considered well served by the local bus company in terms of the volume of services and the amount of different destinations. This owes to the fact that the village lies in between many other large settlements.

There are frequent buses towards Keighley, Haworth, Oakworth, Stanbury, Hebden Bridge and Bradford operated by Keighley Bus Company.

While steam trains running along the heritage Keighley & Worth Valley Railway can be seen from the village, the closest station to Cross Roads with Lees to catch a train is situated less than 1 mile away at Haworth Railway Station.

The closest regular train service providing links towards Skipton, Bradford and Leeds is Keighley station which is approximately 3 miles from the village.

== Sport ==
In history there have been football teams and cricket teams in the village. Today, only Cross Roads Bowling Club continue to exist and they play their matches on the bowling green in Cross Roads Park.

== Religious sites ==
The village has three places of worship. There is St James C of E Church and Lees Methodist Church in the Lees area. There is the Church of Jesus Christ of Latter-day Saints in the Bocking area.

== Local amenities ==
Cross Roads Park is an area with facilities used by families and dog walkers. As of 2016, it is currently in the process of redevelopment.

The Cross Roads Inn is situated at the crossroads junction. This pub plays a significant part in history due to this supposedly being a haunt of Branwell Brontë who was the only brother to the Brontë Sisters. There are also two other pubs in the village with the Bronte Hotel in the Lees area and The 3 Acres in the Lees Moor area. Both of these pubs focus on a food menu as well as drinks. There is also the Bocking Working Mens Club in the Bocking area of the village. Across the village there are many different shops offering different convenient services.

== Notable people ==
Joseph Hardaker (1790) was born in Lees and had 3 volumes of science fiction themed verse published.

Halliwell Sutcliffe (1870–1932) was brought up in the village and was the author of many popular novels, most of which were historical romances set in the Yorkshire Dales.

== See also ==
- Listed buildings in Haworth, Cross Roads and Stanbury
