= John Tudor =

John Tudor may refer to:

- John Tudor (minister) (1930–2009), English Methodist minister
- John Tudor (footballer) (1946–2025), English football player for several teams, most notably Newcastle United
- John Tudor (baseball) (born 1954), American former pitcher in Major League Baseball
- John Tudor (cyclist) (born 1953), Welsh racing cyclist
