= St Michael and All Angels' Church, Haworth =

Church of England church in West Yorkshire, England

Coordinates: 53°49′52.4″N 1°57′22.2″W

St Michael and All Angels' Church
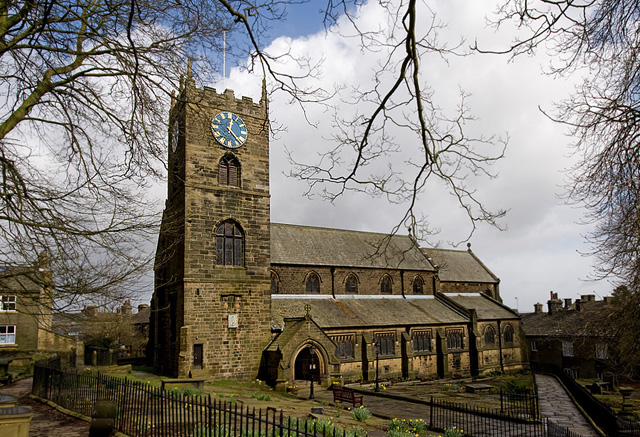
- St Michael and All Angels' Church, Haworth
- St Michael and All Angels' Church
- OS grid reference: SE 02987 37215
- Country: England
- Denomination: Church of England
- Website: Haworth Parish Church

History
- Dedicated: 1881

Architecture
- Heritage designation: Grade II
- Groundbreaking: 1879

Administration
- Diocese: Leeds
- Parish: Haworth

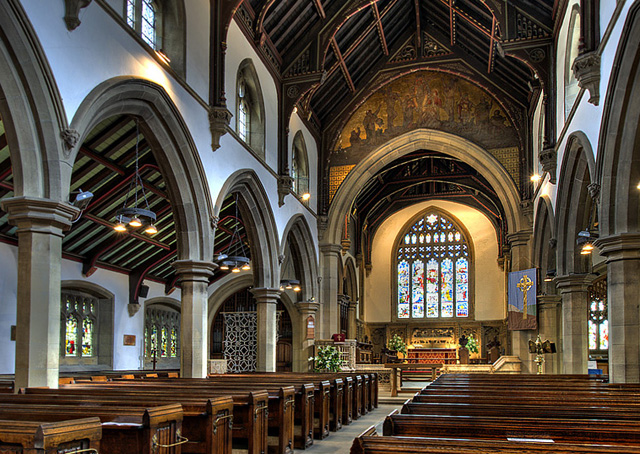
Interior of St Michael and All Angels' Church

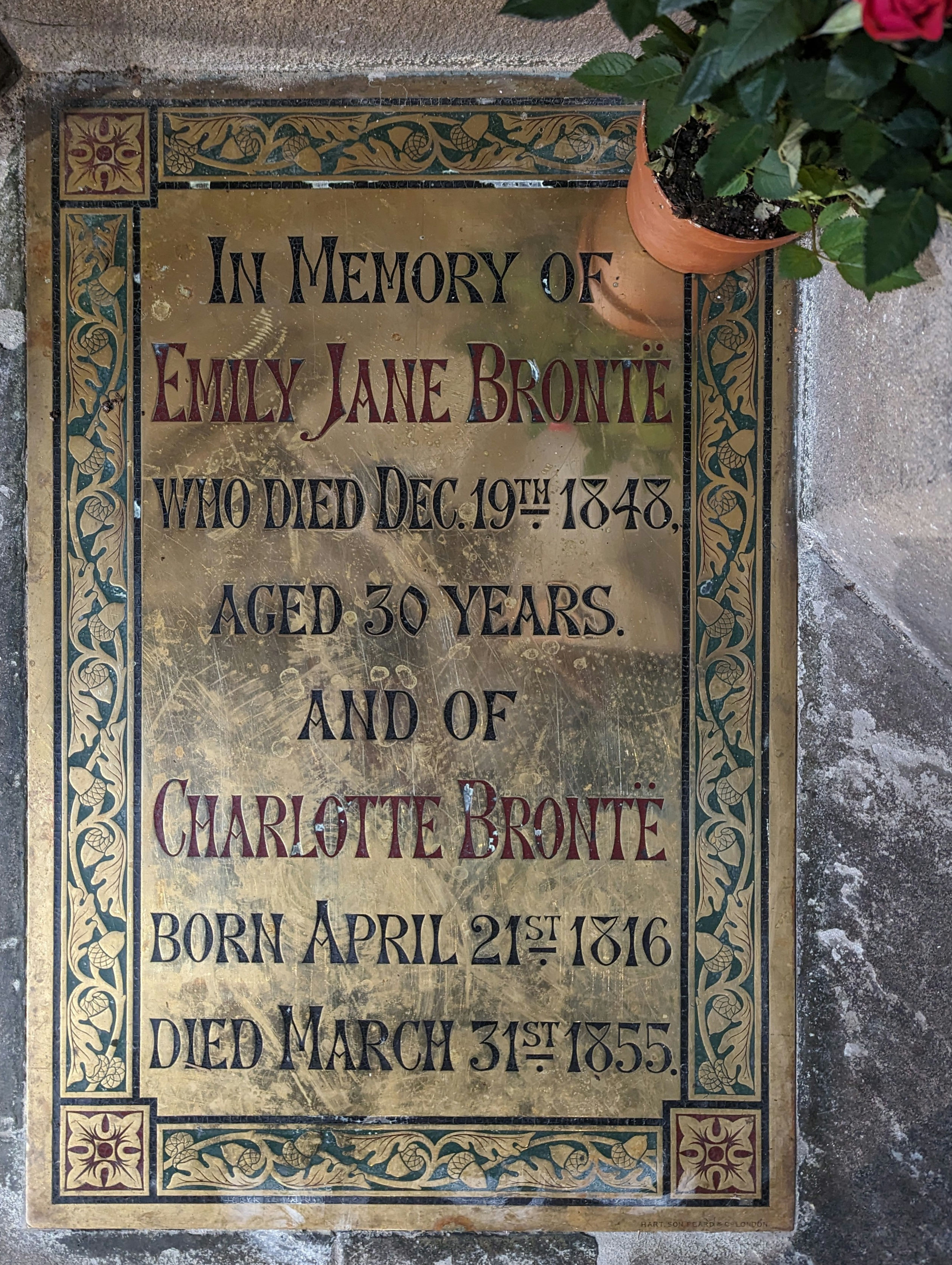
Brass plaque on family vault of Emily Brontë and Charlotte Brontë

St Michael and All Angels' Church is the Church of England parish church of Haworth, West Yorkshire. The majority of the structure, which is the third church building on the site, was built between 1879 and 1881. Parts of the original medieval church building, notably the tower, survive.

The church is best known for its historic association with the three Brontë sisters; their father, Patrick Brontë, served as perpetual curate of the parish between 1820 and 1861.

== History ==
A chapel has existed on the site since 1488, though records held at the Archbishop's office in York command that in 1317 the rector of Bradford and the people of Haworth pay the curate officiating in the chapel. John Wesley was known to have preached in the church many times in the 18th century.

The church was rebuilt in the 18th century in coarse dressed millstone with Westmorland slate on the roof. The tower from this period is still in existence as part of the rebuilding works that took place between 1879 and 1881. This period of rebuilding caused outcry at the time as the church, parsonage and Haworth had become a big attraction due to the notoriety and adoration of the Brontë family, particularly the literature of Anne, Charlotte and Emily.

The church is an active place of Christian worship for the local community within the United Benefice of Haworth and Cross Roads. The church underwent £750,000 worth of much needed repairs to the roof and tower in 2016. This meant that the parishioners shared worship with the Methodist congregation at West Lane in Haworth whilst the renovations were undertaken.

== Brontë connection ==
Patrick Brontë came to Haworth with his wife Maria and children in 1820 from Thornton. He had been offered the perpetual curacy of the church at Haworth by the vicar of Bradford in 1819. He was the minister at St Michael and All Angels for 41 years and was assisted by his later son-in-law, Arthur Bell Nicholls.

The church is well visited by tourists eager to see the Brontë Memorial Chapel in the church and the Brontë family tomb where the mortal remains of all members of the Brontë family with the exception of Anne are interred. The tomb is marked by a simple plaque placed there in 1882 originally at the behest of Arthur Bell Nicholls, but eventually organised by a barrister called Biddell. The memorial chapel was built in 1963 after Sir Tresham Lever, son of Arthur Lever, donated funds to enable its construction. Adjacent to the church is the historic graveyard, church school buildings and the Georgian era Church Parsonage where the Brontë family lived and wrote many of their renowned novels, short stories and poems.

== Graveyard ==
The graveyard is estimated to contain between 40,000 and 42,000 bodies. Some graves contain entire families. Because of the overcrowding the graveyard closed in 1883 with a new cemetery opening in 1893 just off the road to Stanbury. Patrick Brontë campaigned for the graveyard adjacent to the church to be cleaned up and have the headstones placed vertically as the drainage was poor and was not helping decomposition.

== See also ==
- Grade II* listed buildings in Bradford
- Listed buildings in Haworth, Cross Roads and Stanbury
- Brontë family
