= Brontë Parsonage Museum =

Writer's house museum in England

Coordinates: 53°49′52.6″N 1°57′26.8″W

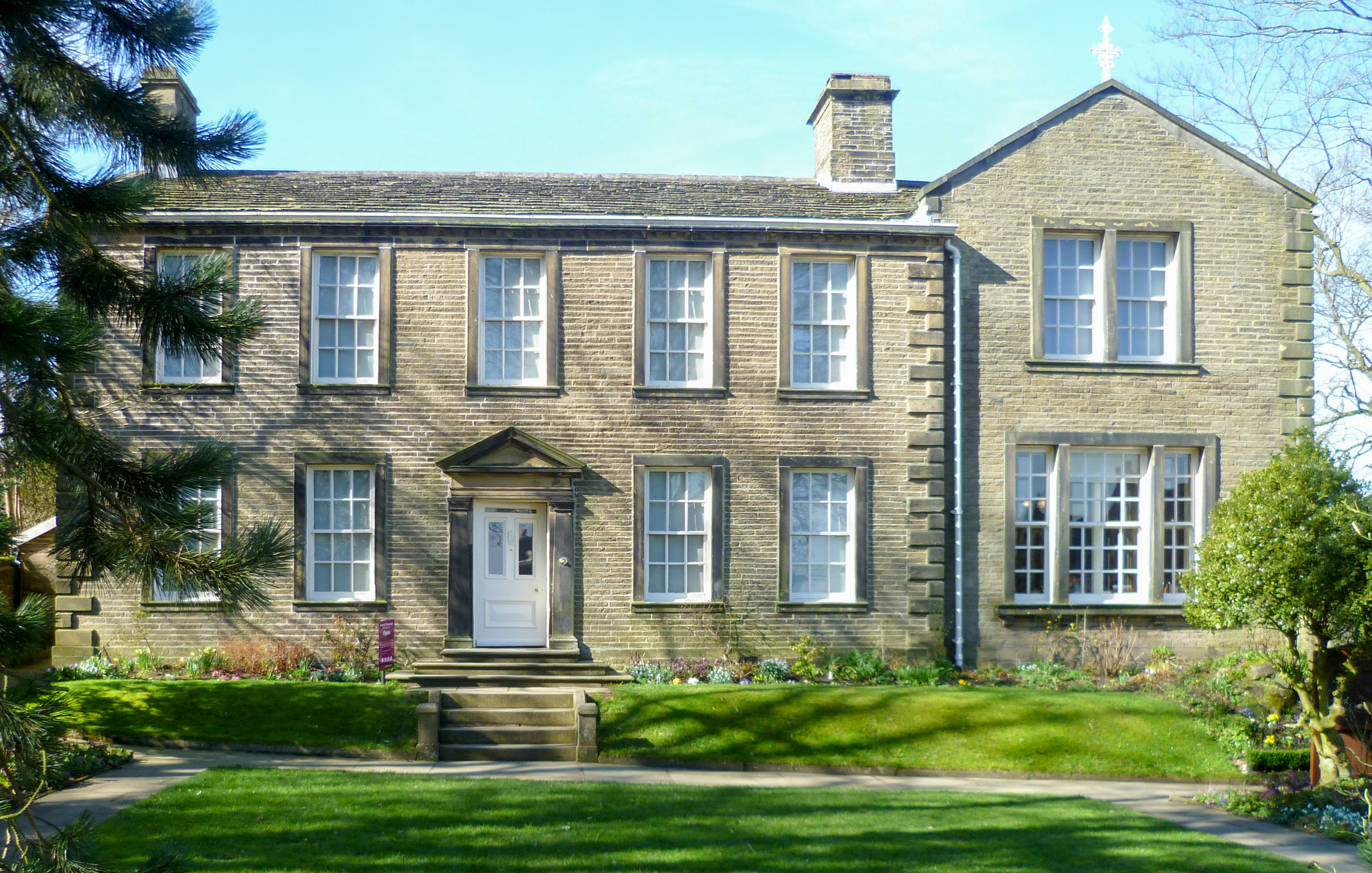
Brontë Parsonage

The Brontë Parsonage Museum is a writer's house museum maintained by the Brontë Society in honour of the Brontë sisters – Charlotte, Emily and Anne. The museum is in the former Brontë family home, the parsonage in Haworth, West Yorkshire, England, where the sisters spent most of their lives and wrote their famous novels.

The Brontë Society, one of the oldest literary societies in the English speaking world, is a registered charity. Its members support the preservation of the museum and library collections.

The parsonage is listed Grade I on the National Heritage List for England.

== Background ==
The parsonage was built between 1778 and 1779. In 1820, Patrick Brontë was appointed incumbent of St Michael and All Angels' Church, Haworth, and arrived at the parsonage with his wife Maria and six children. It was the family home for the rest of their lives, and its moorland setting had a profound influence on the writing of Charlotte, Emily, and Anne. Patrick Brontë was a published author of poetry and fiction and his children grew up accustomed to the sight of books carrying their family name on the parsonage shelves.

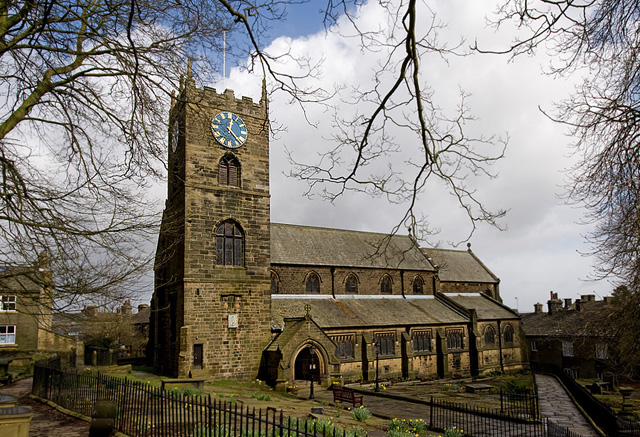
St Michael and All Angel's Church, Haworth

On 15 September 1821, Maria Brontë died of cancer, and her unmarried sister, Elizabeth Branwell, came to run the household, exchanging her home in Penzance for the harsh climate of a bleak northern township. In 1824 the four oldest sisters left Haworth, to attend the Clergy Daughters' School at Cowan Bridge, near Kirkby Lonsdale. The eldest daughter, Maria, was sent home ill and died at the parsonage in May 1825, aged eleven. Ten-year-old Elizabeth was returned home shortly after and died on 15 June.

In 1846 Charlotte, Emily and Anne used part of their Aunt Branwell's legacy to finance the publication of their poems, concealing their true identities under the pseudonyms Currer, Ellis and Acton Bell. Poems was published by Aylott and Jones, but only two copies were sold. Charlotte's first attempt at writing a novel for publication, The Professor, was rejected by several publishing houses, before Smith, Elder & Co. declined to accept it but were encouraging enough for Charlotte to send them her next work, Jane Eyre. It was accepted and published on 19 October 1847. Wuthering Heights and Agnes Grey had been accepted by the London publisher, Thomas Cautley Newby and appeared as a three-volume set in December 1847. After Anne's second novel, The Tenant of Wildfell Hall, Charlotte and Anne were forced to reveal their true identities. Their brother, Branwell, who had become dependent on alcohol and opium for solace, had developed tuberculosis and died suddenly on Sunday 24 September 1848, aged 31. Emily was also dying from the disease, and never left the house after Branwell's funeral. She died aged 30 on 19 December 1848. Anne too had tuberculosis and was taken to Scarborough to try a sea cure but died four days after arriving on 28 May 1849, aged 29 years (Anne's gravestone mistakenly marks her age as 28 when she died).

Charlotte finished the novel Shirley, begun before Branwell's death. It was published in October 1849. Her last novel, Villette, was published in 1853. She married her father's curate Arthur Bell Nicholls in Haworth Church on 29 June 1854. She died on 31 March 1855, in the early stages of pregnancy, at age 38. Patrick Brontë lived at the parsonage for six more years, cared for by his son-in-law, and died there on 7 June 1861, at the age of 84.

== Brontë Society ==
After Patrick Brontë's death in 1861 the contents of the parsonage were auctioned. Friends and servants sold keepsakes and letters. In 1893 the chief librarian of Bradford Library held a meeting suggesting that relics, letters and documents relating to the Brontës should be collected and preserved for posterity. The Brontë Society was founded at a public meeting and a collection of Brontëana was started. By 1895 it was large enough to be displayed in a museum above the Yorkshire Penny Bank in Haworth. The society attracted 260 members, and about 10,000 visitors visited the museum in its first year. Sir James Roberts bought Haworth Parsonage in 1928 for £3,000 (equivalent to £228,313 in 2023). He equipped it as a museum and gave it to the Brontë Society. Henry Bonnell of Philadelphia bequeathed his collection to the society in 1926 and it was transferred to the parsonage when it opened, making it accessible to Brontë scholars. The collection has grown and been supplemented by loan materials. The society has about 2,000 members.

The mahogany desk at which Charlotte wrote her novels, which had been in private collections for more than a century, was donated to the museum in 2011 by a donor who purchased it anonymously for £20,000 in 2009.

== In popular culture ==
The parsonage was used as a location in the 1970 film The Railway Children, where it featured as the home of Dr Forrest.

The opening of the museum in 1928 is central to Frances Brody's 2018 novel A Snapshot of Murder (Piatkus, ISBN 978-0-349-41432-4).

The parsonage is one of several locations visited in the 2019 debut novel, The Paper & Hearts Society, by Brontë Society chair Lucy Powrie, when the five main characters stop there on the literary road trip.

== See also ==
- Grade I listed buildings in City of Bradford
- Listed buildings in Haworth, Cross Roads and Stanbury
