= Bradford Libraries =

Library service in West Yorkshire, England

Bradford Libraries is a public library service serving the City of Bradford Metropolitan district in West Yorkshire, England. There are 30 libraries including City Library in Bradford city centre. There is also a Local Studies and Archives Library in separate premises in the city centre.

Bradford Central Library used to be in a multi-storey building opposite the Alhambra, just off the city centre. This building was found to be a fire risk in 2011 and additionally in 2013 was found to have asbestos inside its walls. A new city centre library was opened in December 2013 opposite City Hall and the local studies and reference library was moved into an annexe of the former library building to the south.

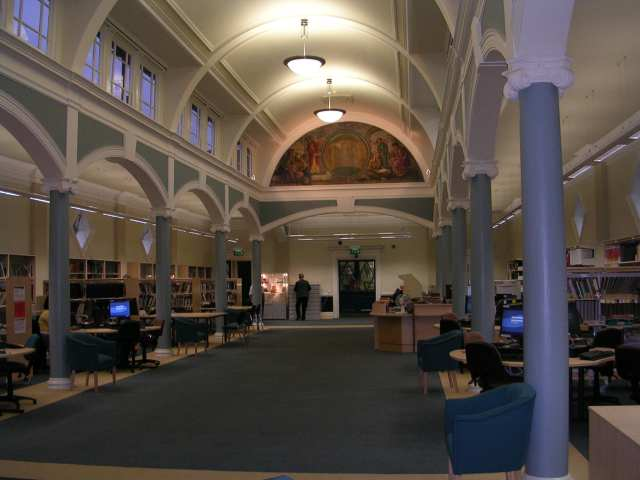
Interior of Keighley Reference Library – North Street

Keighley Library was opened in 1904 and was the first Carnegie Library in England being paid for by Scots born industrialist Andrew Carnegie.

Bingley Library move from its former premises in Bingley Precinct in 2009, to a new smaller facility slightly east in the same precinct which was rebuilt and rebranded as the 5Rise Centre.

Shipley had a Carnegie library which was replaced with a building on a different site in 1985. The new library underwent a £640,000 overhaul in 2015 and re-opened in early 2016.

In early 2016, budget restraints at Bradford Council led to the announcements that only the main libraries in the city centre, Bingley, Eccleshill, Ilkley, Keighley, Manningham and Shipley would carry on to have librarians and be fully funded by the council. The proposal for the remaining libraries would be that they would no longer be part of the statutory service without a staffing budget and be offered out as community hub volunteer run models. Since 2020 the Council has diverted money from health and wellbeing budget to the library budget, arguing that they share integral values in terms of wellbeing delivery. In 2023 most libraries earmarked for closure are still open but some only open one day a week.

== List of libraries ==
- Addingham
- Allerton
- Baildon
- Bingley
- Bolling Hall
- Burley
- City (Bradford)
- Clayton
- Denholme
- Eccleshill
- Girlington
- Great Horton
- Holme Wood
- Idle
- Ilkley
- Keighley
- Laisterdyke
- Manningham
- Menston
- Queensbury
- Shipley
- Silsden
- St Augustines
- Thornbury
- Thornton
- Wibsey
- Wilsden
- Wrose
- Wyke

== See also ==
- Bradford Mechanics' Institute Library
