= David Plastow =

British businessman (1932–2019)

Sir David Plastow FRSA
- Born: David Arnold Stuart Plastow; 9 May 1932; Grimsby, Lincolnshire, England
- Died: 5 June 2019 (aged 87)
- Occupation: Businessman

Sir David Arnold Stuart Plastow, FRSA (9 May 1932 – 5 June 2019) was a British businessman who was chairman of the UK's Medical Research Council 1990–1998.

He became an automobile executive who filled a series of high level appointments in the UK. Between 1958 and 1980 he worked for Rolls-Royce Motors (including its predecessor and successor companies). He was Chairman of the company between 1972 and 1980. He subsequently developed a variety of industry directorships and other appointments.

== Career ==
Plastow was born in Grimsby. He joined Vauxhall Motors Limited in 1950 as an apprentice, and within seven years had worked his way up to the position of sales manager. In 1958 he switched to Rolls-Royce where he worked on the commercial side of the company for the Scotland and North of England region of what was then the automobile division of a company concentrating on aero-engine production.

In 1968, now the senior sales director, he joined the board with responsibility for the overall distribution of automobiles. Three years later, in 1971, Rolls-Royce Limited went into liquidation and was for a period nationalised. The financial problems were blamed on the aero-engine division, however, and at the start of 1971 Plastow, from the automobile division, replaced Geoffrey Fawn as managing director of the Rolls-Royce Motor Car Division, while Fawn retained a senior position within the Aero Engine Division. When Rolls-Royce Motors was established as a separate entity in 1972, Plastow became its chairman. He became a director of Vickers plc in 1975, and remained a Vickers director after the Rolls- Royce business was acquired by Vickers in 1980. From 1990 to 1998 he was the chairman of the Medical Research Council.

== Views ==
Following the 1973 oil price shock political pressure developed in the western world, especially in the US, for cars to become smaller. Detroit was already responding to the economic pressures by developing a wider range of smaller models but also launched a powerful and sustained lobbying campaign directed at Washington. Plastow joined in: in 1978 David Plastow, chief Executive of a company dependent on larger models, in an address to an international audience at Detroit, described as "...dangerous nonsense ... [the idea of]... legislators or bureaucrats in either country [deciding] that it is good to level down to a basic type of car....Man continually seeks a better way of life. He is constantly climbing out of one situation upwards into the next, and the symbol of his success during most of this century has often been the type of car he drives".

== Personal life ==
Educated first at Clee Grammar School for Boys in Lincolnshire, and then at Culford School between 1946 and 1950, Plastow married Barbara Ann May in 1954. The marriage produced two recorded children. In addition to his professional life, Plastow found time to be an enthusiastic football supporter. In 1977, he told a journalist that his favourite footballer was Franz Beckenbauer whom he had first seen in action in 1966 at a World Cup tournament in London.

Plastow died on 5 June 2019, aged 87.

== Honours ==
- Fellows of the Royal Society of Arts (FRSA)
- 1986 Knighted Queen's Birthday Honours
