= Jack Croft Baker =

English businessman & local politician (1894-1962)

Sir Jack Croft Baker, CBE (25 February 1894 – 18 February 1962) was an English businessman and local politician.

== Biography ==
Baker was the son of Henry Croft Baker and Alderman Ada Baker, JP. Educated at Clee Grammar School and Elmfield College, York, Baker was active in local politics, being elected to Cleethorpes Urban District Council in 1928 and becoming its Chairman for 1933–34; in 1931, he was elected onto the Lindsey Council Council and in 1939 became an Alderman of Cleethorpes (he was also Mayor of Cleethorpes for the year 1940–41).

He resigned his commitments on the Borough and County Councils in 1945 to focus on business. With connections with a number of Grimsby trawling companies, he had become increasingly concerned with the fishing industry, as Vice-President (1940–44) and then President (1944–57) of the British Trawlers' Federation.

In 1956, according to The Times, he "played a leading part" in negotiations with Icelandic trawler owners ahead of the Paris agreement which ended the four-year ban on landing Icelandic fish at Grimsby. During the Second World War, he had been vice-chairman of the Fish Industry Joint Council; in 1949, he was appointed a Commander of the Order of the British Empire and in 1958, he was knighted. He had married Doris Ann, daughter of Harry Beales in 1914, and had two sons and two daughters. He died on 18 February 1962, aged 67, at his Cleethorpes home.
