= Springwell Harrogate =

Location
- Grove Road; Harrogate, HG1 5EP; England
- Coordinates: 54.001096°N 1.5335383°W

Information
- Type: Academy Alternative Provision
- Trust: Wellspring Academy Trust
- Department for Education URN: 140077 Tables
- Ofsted: Reports
- Head teacher: Scott Jacques
- Gender: Mixed
- Age: 11 to 16
- Enrolment: 11 as of July 2023
- Capacity: 30
- Website: swharrogate.org.uk

Springwell Harrogate (formerly The Grove Academy) is a mixed alternative provision secondary school, located in Harrogate, North Yorkshire. It provides for pupils who are unable to attend a mainstream school for reasons including illness or behaviour. The school had an enrolment of 11 pupils in 2023. Its current headteacher is Scott Jacques.

In September 2013 the "Harrogate Pupil Referral Service" converted to academy status under the sponsorship of Schools Partnership Academies Trust (now Delta Academies Trust), reopening as "The Grove Academy".

In 2015 it was rated as 'Outstanding' (Grade 1) by Ofsted.

In April 2020, the school was transferred to be operated by Wellspring Academy Trust. It reopened as "Springwell Harrogate" at the beginning of the next academic year in September 2020.
