= Phil Ball (writer) =

British writer based in Spain

Phil Ball (born 1957) is a British sports journalist, football commentator, and author based in Spain. He is the author of many books on Spanish football, including Morbo: The Story of Spanish Football (2001), and the first English-language history of Real Madrid, White Storm (2002). From 2001 to 2014, he wrote a regular column on Spanish football culture for ESPN.

He has lived in San Sebastián, Spain, for over twenty years.

== Early life ==
Phil Ball was born in Canada to English parents. He grew up in Cleethorpes on the northeast coast of England, having moved there in 1957. As a youngster he supported Grimsby Town F.C., saying, "I was brought up on lower league football".

He attended Clee Humberstone Foundation Grammar School (later Matthew Humberstone School).

== Career ==
Ball began with an English teaching post in a state comprehensive school in Hull. He later taught in Peru and Oman, eventually moving to San Sebastián.

Ball is a lifelong football enthusiast. His first published book was Morbo: the story of Spanish football (2001). The book linked the traditional antagonisms in Spanish football (the "Morbo" of the title) to Spain's regional, linguistic and political divisions. Morbo was listed for the William Hill award and won the GQ Sports Book of the Year award. A Spanish translation was published in 2010 and an updated edition came out in 2011. It was voted into the top 50 best football books by the British-based magazine 442 in 2017.

=== Language education ===
Ball is prominent in language education, authoring scholastic material for the Basque and Spanish curricula. He specialises in CLIL (Content and Language Integrated Learning) and has contributed articles and publications to the field. His latest book is Putting CLIL into Practice (2015, Oxford University Press), co-authored with Keith Kelly and John Clegg. It offers a theory of practice for teachers based on what Ball calls 'the three dimensions of content'. His series of textbooks for 12 year-old learners in Spain, Subject Projects was nominated for the Innovation Awards in Education at the ELTONS in London, in 2016.

== Works ==
White Storm: 100 years of Real Madrid (2002) - first English-language history of the Spanish football club, written to celebrate its centenary. It used a similar socio-political approach to that taken in Morbo.

An Englishman Abroad : Beckham's Spanish adventure (2004) chronicled the first year of English footballer David Beckham's spell at Real Madrid.

The Hapless Teacher's Handbook (2006) marked a departure from sports writing. It was a humorous autobiographical account of his years as a schoolteacher.

=== Articles ===
His football articles appeared in sports publications, including When Saturday Comes, ESPN, The New York Times and Financial Times. He has worked as an announcer for Sky Sports' La Liga broadcast and written a regular weekly column on Spanish football for ESPN since 2002. He writes for Football España and Liga Fever.

== Personal life ==
His son was a footballer who played for Antiguoko, a boys' club in San Sebastián which produced Xabi Alonso, Mikel Arteta, Andoni Iraola and Aritz Aduriz in previous years.
