= Parkside School, Cullingworth =

Foundation school in Bradford, West Yorkshire, England

Parkside School
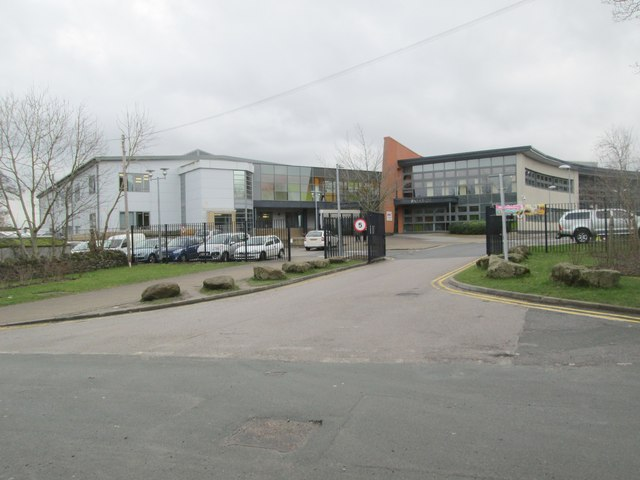

Location
- Parkside Terrace; Cullingworth; Bradford, West Yorkshire, BD13 5AD; England; 53.82733°N 1.89465°W

Information
- Type: Academy
- Local authority: City of Bradford
- Trust: Wellspring Academy Trust
- Department for Education URN: 150001 Tables
- Ofsted: Reports
- Headteacher: Kath Referee Thompson
- Gender: Coeducational
- Age: 11 to 18
- Enrolment: 1,167 as of August 2023
- Houses: Salt, Bronte, Hockney
- Colours: Grey, purple, light blue (separate houses)
- Website: http://www.parksideschool.net/

Parkside School is a coeducational secondary school and sixth form, located in Cullingworth in the City of Bradford, West Yorkshire, England.

The school was formed after a wide scale reorganisation of education in the Bradford district in 2000. The school was also previously awarded specialist Arts College status.

Previously a foundation school administered by the Parkside Creative Learning Trust and Bradford City Council, in September 2023 Parkside School converted to academy status. The school is now sponsored by Wellspring Academy Trust.
