= Haworth, Cross Roads and Stanbury =

Former civil parish in West Yorkshire, England

Coordinates: 53.832°N 1.945°W

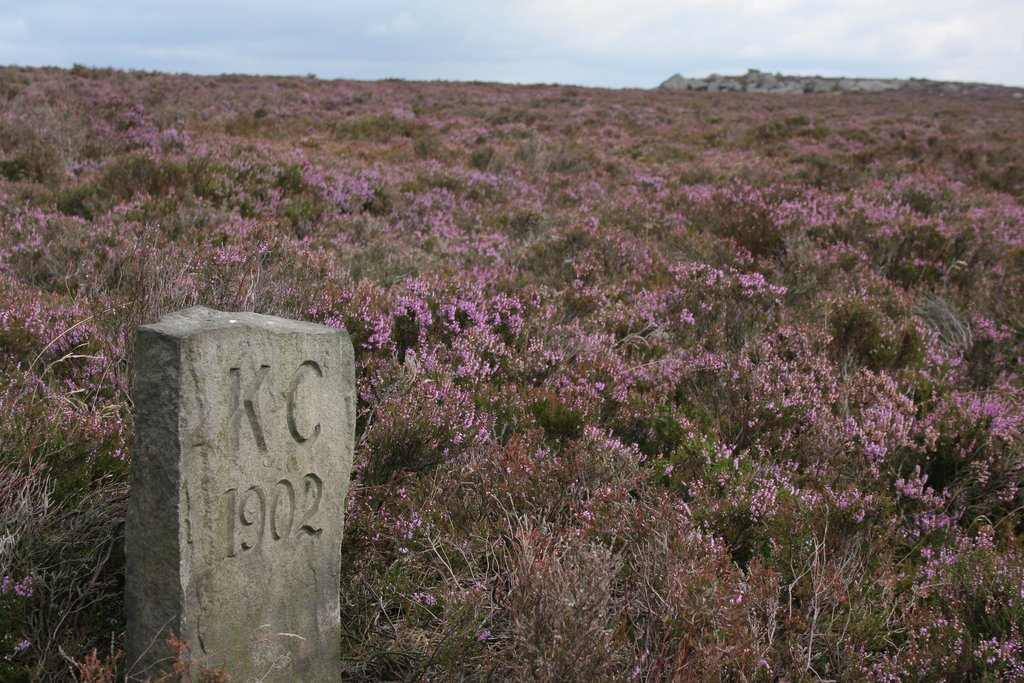
- An image of Haworth, Cross Roads and Stanbury

- Location within West Yorkshire
- Population: 6,994 (2011 census)
- Civil parish: Haworth and Stanbury; Cross Roads
- Metropolitan borough: Bradford
- Metropolitan county: West Yorkshire
- Region: Yorkshire and the Humber
- Country: England
- Sovereign state: United Kingdom

Haworth, Cross Roads and Stanbury is a former civil parish that covered the far western hinterland of the City of Bradford in West Yorkshire, England. According to the 2001 census the parish had a population of 6,566, increasing to 6,994 at the 2011 Census. As its name suggests, it covered Haworth, Cross Roads and Stanbury, with a large moorland area to the west of Stanbury. In total, the civil parish covered 1,737 hectares (4,290 acres). The parish was formed on 1 April 1999. On 1 April 2023 the parish was abolished and split to form the parishes of "Cross Roads" and "Haworth and Stanbury".
