= John Tudor (minister) =

English Methodist minister (1930–2009)

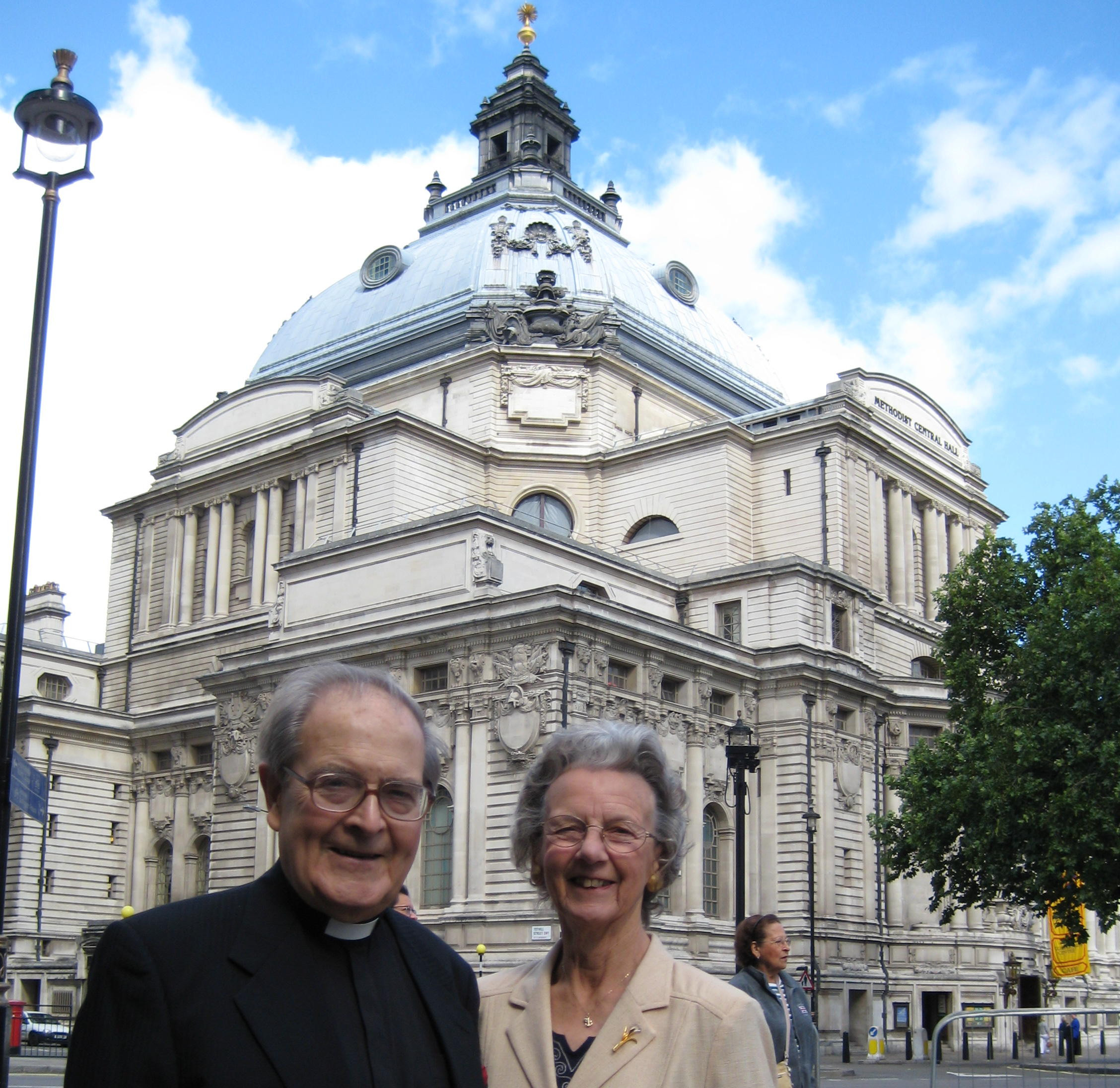
John and Cynthia Tudor outside Methodist Central Hall, Westminster

R. John Tudor (8 February 1930 – 29 October 2009) was an English Methodist minister. He is considered the last of what were called the 'Mission Men' in Methodism.

== Early life and family ==
Tudor was a son of the manse, born in Northampton in 1930. His father was the Rev C. Leonard Tudor, who was for many years the General Secretary of the Home Mission Division of the Methodist Church.

Tudor was educated at Clee Grammar School for Boys in Cleethorpes and later at Manchester University before joining the Royal Air Force. He trained for the Methodist Ministry at Hartley Victoria College, Manchester. He married his wife, Cynthia, in 1956.

== Ministry ==
Tudor's early years of ministry saw him serving mainly in the Methodist Missions of the Midlands, including Queen's Hall, Derby and Coventry Central Hall. While in Derby he built links with the United Methodist Church in America and visited Fort Worth, Texas where he was later made an honorary Texan and Freeman of the City of Fort Worth. He also served in Brighton's Dome Mission and to Brighton he later retired. He was Superintendent Minister while serving 14 years at Westminster Methodist Central Hall until 1995 where he supported members of civic life and built good relationships with his ecumenical neighbours including the late Cardinal Archbishop Basil Hume. He was Chaplain to the Ancient Order of Foresters, served on the Board of Regents at Harris Manchester College in Oxford, and was a trustee of the Joseph Rank trust for 33 years.

A memorial service was held at Westminster Central Hall on Sunday 7 February 2010 attended by the Lord Mayor of Westminster, the Dean of Westminster Abbey, the Auxiliary Bishop of Westminster Cathedral and with an address by the Rev Paul Hulme.
