= Haworth railway station =

Railway station in West Yorkshire, England

Haworth
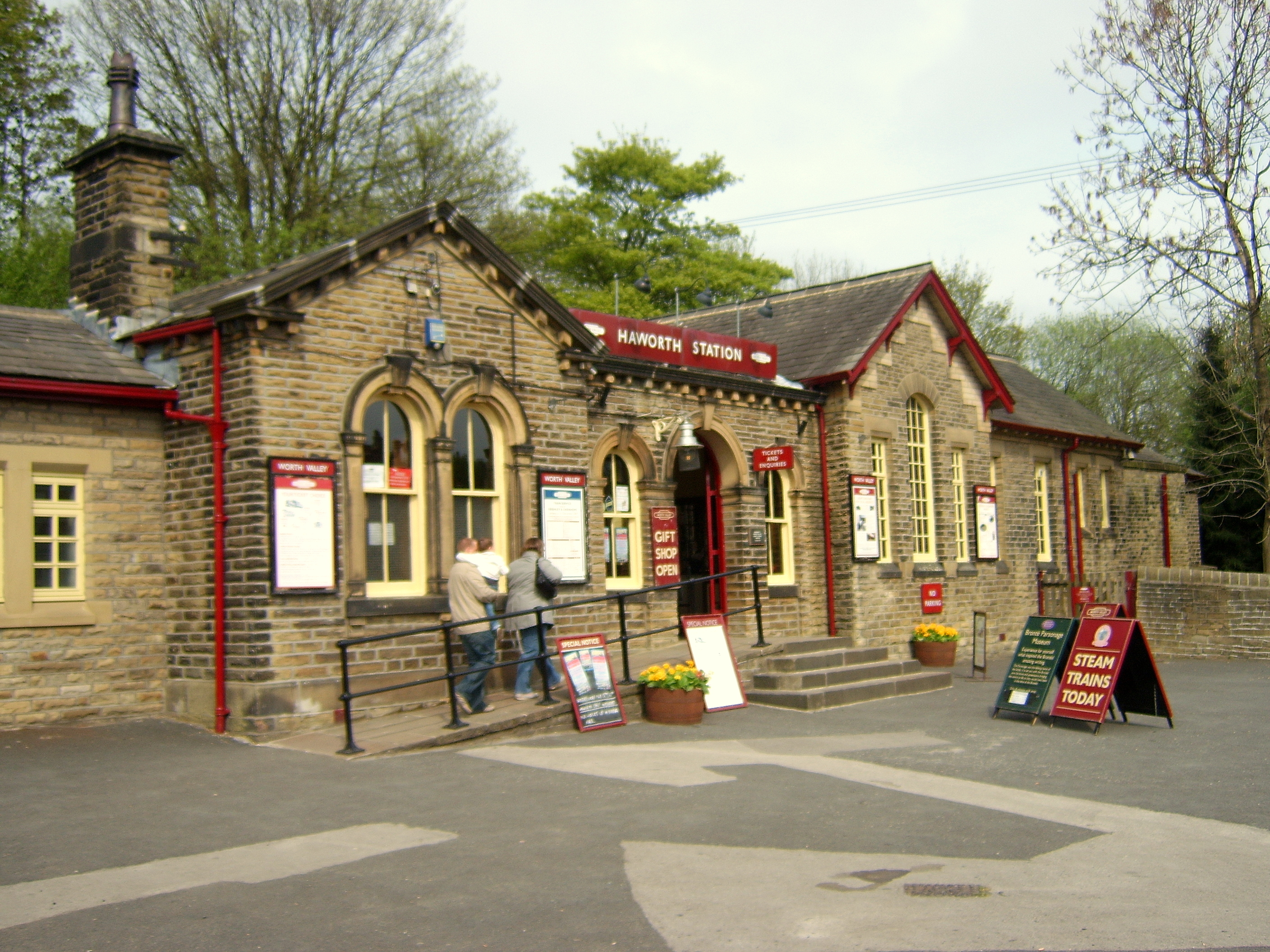
- View of Haworth station entrance

General information
- Location: Haworth, City of Bradford; England
- Coordinates: 53.831200°N 1.948800°W
- Grid reference: SE034372
- System: Station on heritage railway
- Manager: Keighley and Worth Valley Railway
- Platforms: 1

History
- Opened: 1867; Closed 1962; Reopened 1968
Location

Haworth railway station serves the village of Haworth in West Yorkshire, England.

== History ==
It was opened in 1867 along with the rest of the Keighley and Worth Valley Railway, and closed in 1962. Preservation led to the line being reopened in June 1968 and now serves as the headquarters of the railway. The former goods shed in the railway yard has been expanded into the locomotive shed for the railway providing facilities for the storage, maintenance and overhaul of the locomotives on the line.

In 1967, Look at Life featured the station and its volunteers in the 'Playing Trains' episode.

The station, its immediate environs and the railway workshops are all designated as part of the Haworth Conservation Area by Bradford Council.

== Stationmasters ==
- Edward Coates 1867 – 1869
- William Posnett ca. 1871 – 1878
- D. Daw 1878 – 1880 (formerly station master at Oakworth, afterwards station master at Chapel en le Frith)
- Frederick Hayward 1880 – 1914
- Walter Beswick 1914 – 1925
- E. Crossley 1938 – 1947 (also station master at Oxenhope)

Preceding station	Heritage railways	Following station
Oxenhope Terminus	Keighley & Worth Valley Railway	Oakworth towards Keighley

== See also ==
- Listed buildings in Haworth, Cross Roads and Stanbury
