= Wellspring Academy Trust =

- Formation: June 27, 2012; 14 years ago
- Type: Academy Trust
- Purpose: Education
- Location: County Way, Barnsley, S70 2JW
- Website: wellspringacademytrust.co.uk

Wellspring Academy Trust is a multi-academy trust that manages 31 schools in the north of England. As an academy trust, it is an exempt charity regulated by the Department for Education.

== Schools ==
=== Alternative provision ===
- Phoenix Park Academy, Grimsby
- Sevenhills Academy, Grimsby
- Springwell Alternative Academy, Barnsley
- Springwell Alternative Academy Grantham, Grantham
- Springwell Alternative Academy Lincoln, Lincoln
- Springwell Alternative Academy Mablethorpe, Mablethorpe
- Springwell Alternative Academy Spalding, Spalding
- Springwell Harrogate, Harrogate
- Springwell Leeds Academy, Leeds
- Springwell Lincoln City Academy, Lincoln

=== Primary ===
- Bramley Park Academy, Leeds
- Coomb Briggs Primary Academy, Immingham
- Eastfield Infants and Nursery Academy, Louth
- Ebor Gardens Primary Academy, Leeds
- Elements Primary Free School, Leeds
- Horncastle Primary School, Horncastle
- Lacey Gardens Junior Academy, Louth
- Littlecoates Primary Academy, Grimsby
- Oakhill Primary Academy, Barnsley
- Oakwell Rise Primary Academy, Barnsley
- The Forest Academy, Barnsley
- Victoria Primary Academy, Leeds

=== Secondary ===
- Beacon Academy, Cleethorpes
- Parkside School, Bradford

=== Special ===
- Forest Moor School, Harrogate
- Green Meadows Academy, Leeds
- Greenacre School, Barnsley
- Joseph Norton Academy, Huddersfield
- Penny Field School, Leeds
- Springwell Special Academy, Barnsley
- The Forest School, Knaresborough
- Trent View College, Scunthorpe
