= Keighley Library =

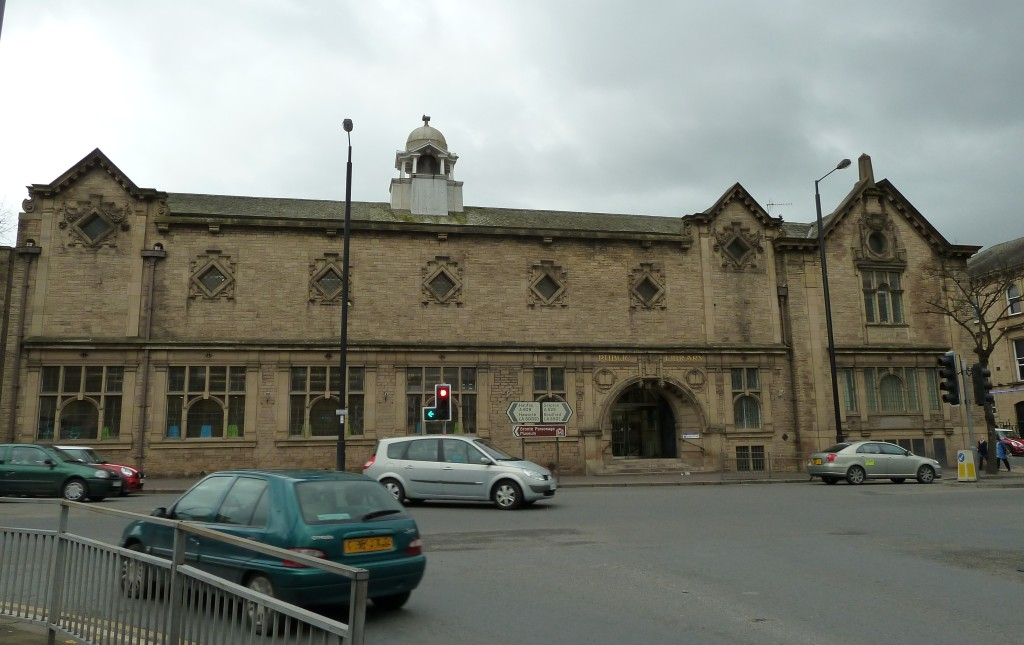

- Location within West Yorkshire
- 53°52′5″N 1°54′36″W
- Location: Keighley, West Yorkshire, England
- OS grid reference: SE06024131

History
- Built: 1904

Site notes
- Architect(s): Arthur McKewan and James Swan
- Architectural style: Arts and Crafts
- Governing body: Bradford Metropolitan District Council

Listed Building – Grade II
- Designated: 4 December 1986
- Reference no.: 1134038

Keighley Library is an early 20th-century public library in Keighley, West Yorkshire, England. Owned by Bradford Metropolitan District Council, it still operates as a library as well as providing access to the local studies and archive service.

The building is a Grade II listed building and was the first public library in England to be endowed by Andrew Carnegie. Designed by Birmingham architects, Arthur McKewan and James Swan, it is built in the Arts and Crafts style.

== History ==
Keighley's first library was that of the Mechanics Institute which was established in 1825. The establishment of public libraries by local authorities was enabled following the passing of the Public Libraries Act 1850 but nationally take-up was slow until the last two decades of the 19th century. In 1898, the Keighley Mechanics Institute called on Keighley Town Council to establish a free library, recognising that the institute's own library had limitations. The president of the institute, Swire Smith, had become friends with industrialist and philanthropist, Andrew Carnegie, and approached Carnegie seeking funds to build a public library. On 4 August 1899 Carnegie wrote to Smith donating the sum of £10,000 on condition that the town council donated a site for the building. Smith immediately forwarded the offer to the council who unanimously accepted the gift at its meeting on 8 August 1899.

Identifying a potential site did not take the council long as there were plans already in place for work in the North Street area of the town centre. but the council did not call for designs for the library until autumn 1900. By the competition closing date, 30 April 1901, 148 designs had been submitted. The designs were judged by Leonard Stokes, a Fellow of the Royal Institute of British Architects. The winning design was by a Birmingham based partnership, Arthur McKewan and James Swan.

Tenders for the building works totalling £7,358 were awarded in January 1902 ranging from £3,433 for the masonry works to £105 for painting.

The ceremonial laying of the foundation stone took place on 9 August 1902, the same day as the postponed coronation of King Edward VII, and became part of the town's celebrations of the coronation. The foundation stone was laid by Sir Swire Smith.

The library was formally opened on 20 August 1904 by the Duke of Devonshire, while an art exhibition inside the library was separately opened by the duke's niece, Lady Moyra Cavendish, who was accompanying the duke in the absence of the duchess due to illness. The ceremony at the library was followed by another ceremony at which the assets and properties of the Mechanic's Institute were handed over to the council to become part of the town's education system. The 13,000 books from the institute library were transferred to the new library.

A reference library was added in 1912 and a children's library in 1929. The building was expanded in 1961 with the addition of a two-storey extension to the south of the original building.

The library closed for six months in 2007 for refurbishment work costing £1.1 million. The 1961 extension no longer forms part of the library but is still owned and used by Bradford Council.

== Architecture ==
Built of coursed stone, the library is a two-story building. All doorways are arched. The ground floor windows are mullioned and transomed while the first floor windows are set on the diagonal. The building is topped by dome on a wooden frame. Pevsner describes the style as "Free Renaissance at its trickiest", but is generally described as being in the Arts and Crafts style.

The interior of the first floor is vaulted and contains at each end a mural painted in 1948 featuring scenes from the Rubaiyat of Omar Khayyam by local artist, Alex Smith.

The extension, which does not form part of the listed building, was built of Huddersfield stone and Burslem bricks.

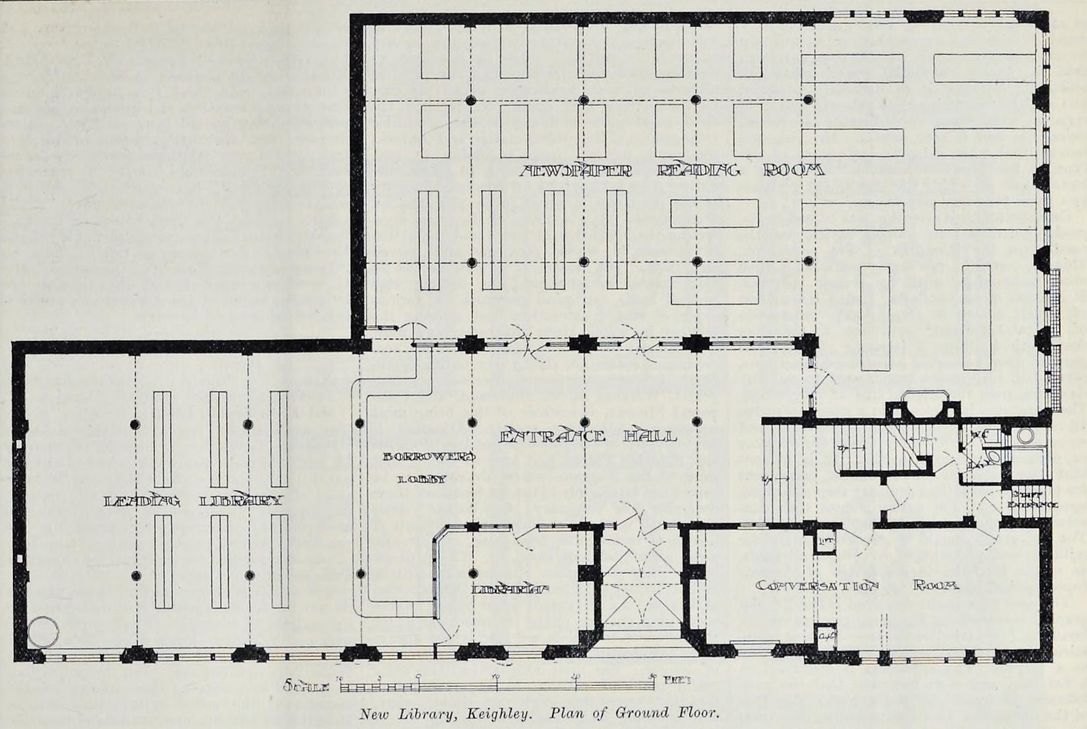
The original ground floor plan

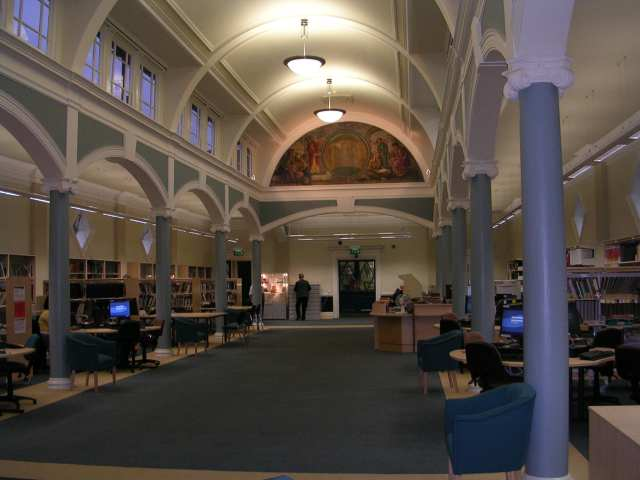
The interior of the first floor in 2007.

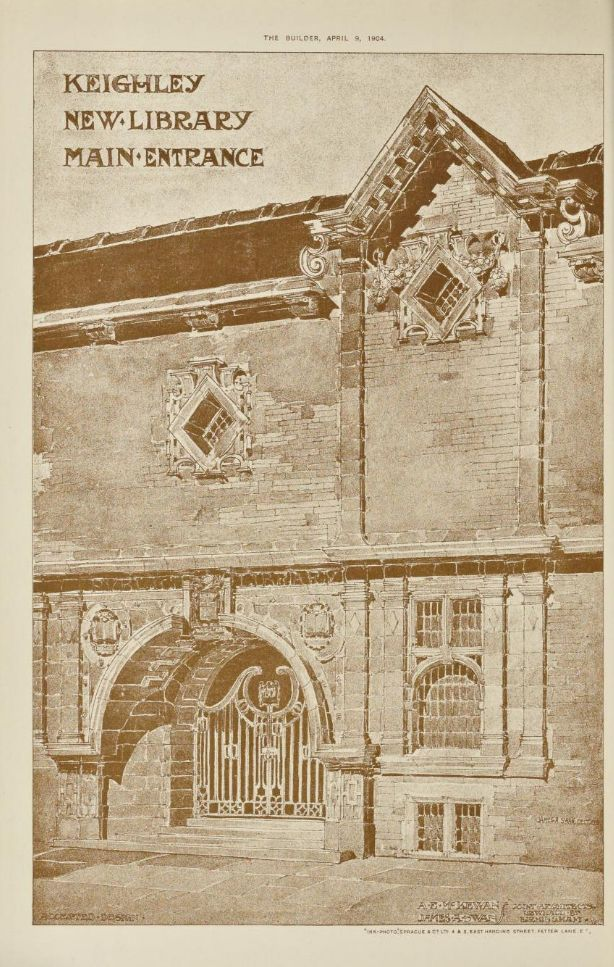
The front entrance as built in 1904.
