= Beacon Academy, Cleethorpes =

School in North East Lincolnshire, England

Beacon Academy

Location
- Chatsworth Place; Cleethorpes, North East Lincolnshire, DN35 9NF; England
- Coordinates: 53.55011111°N 0.04891667°W

Information
- Type: Academy
- Motto: Enlighten, Inspire, Innovate
- Established: September 2017
- Trust: Wellspring Academy Trust
- Department for Education URN: 139649 Tables
- Ofsted: Reports
- Executive Principal: Dave Whitaker
- Gender: Coeducational
- Age: 11 to 16
- Enrolment: 666
- Capacity: 750
- Website: Official website

Beacon Academy is a coeducational secondary school sponsored by the Wellspring Academy Trust, in Cleethorpes, North East Lincolnshire.

Beacon Academy opened on 1 September 2017. The Wellspring Academy Trust was granted sponsorship of the academy on 1 March 2017.

The academy is situated in the Beacon Hill area of Cleethorpes.

== History ==
The following predecessor schools have existed on the school site:

Beacon Hill Secondary Modern School existed on the Chatsworth Place site during this period.

Matthew Humberstone Church of England School (1973–2010).

St.Andrew’s College (2010–2013).

Holy Family Catholic Academy (2013–2017).

In July 2021, Beacon Academy was named by the DfE in Wave 2 of the School Rebuilding Programme. Construction of a new £19 Million building commenced on 13 May 2024 and was due for completion in August 2025, however the building was delayed to October 2025, in November the new building was officially completed and opened for students at the school

the overall completion of the project is April 2026. This will replace the current building which was constructed in 1959.

== Ofsted ratings ==
Holy Family Catholic Academy was graded ‘Good’ by OFSTED in a full, Section 5 Inspection in June 2015.

Following a short, Section 8, OFSTED inspection on 6 February 2019, Beacon Academy’s status remained as ‘Good’.

Following a full, Section 5, OFSTED inspection on 3–4 March 2020. Beacon Academy’s status remained as ‘Good’. In the new OFSTED Inspection Framework, Beacon was graded ‘Good’ for overall effectiveness. The academy was graded ‘Good’ in all 4 inspection categories.
