= St Mary Redcliffe =

- Church of St Mary the Virgin
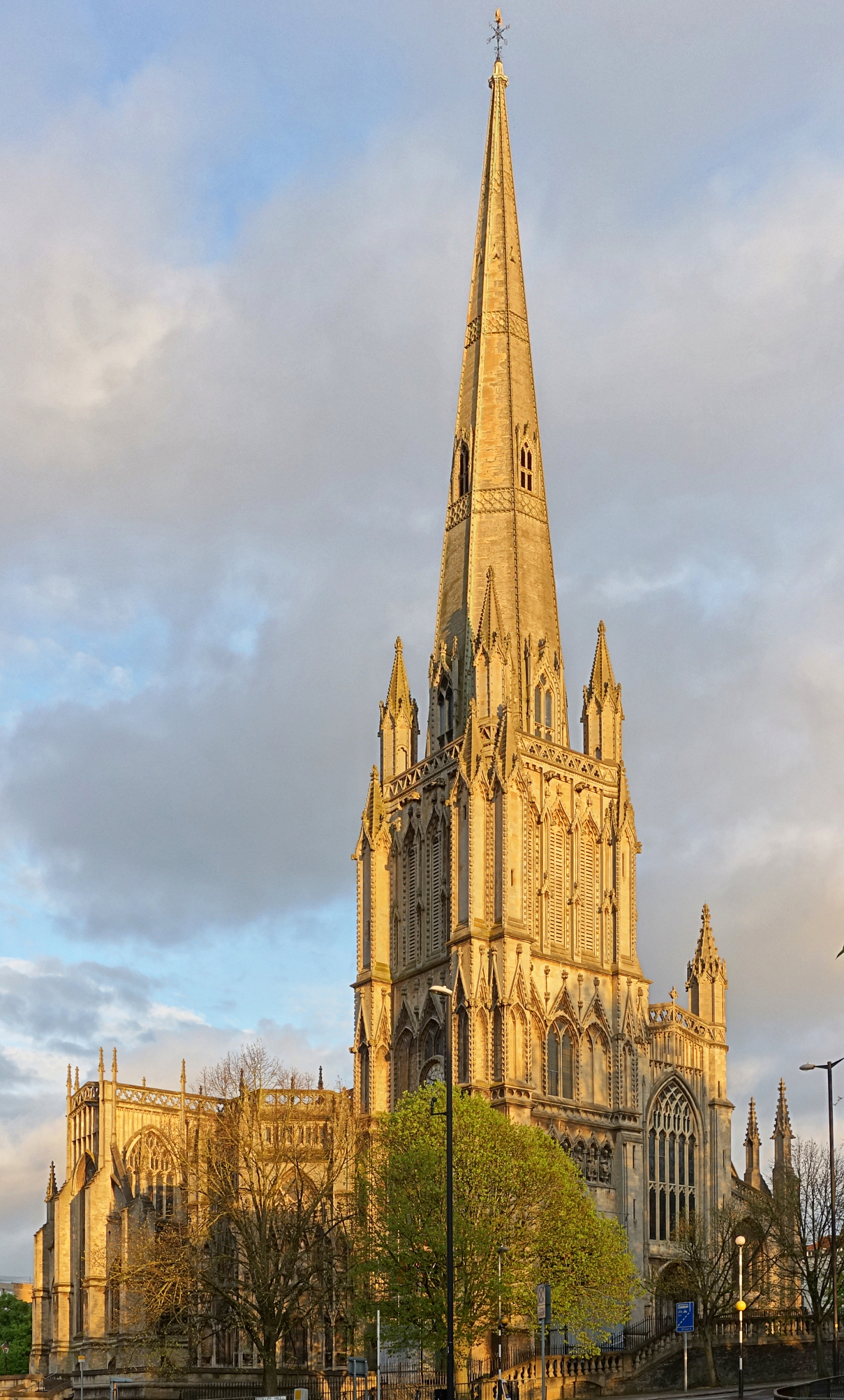
- St Mary Redcliffe from the north west, showing tower, spire, nave and hexagonal porch

- Location in Bristol
- 51°26′54″N 2°35′23″W
- Location: Redcliffe, Bristol, England
- Denomination: Church of England
- Churchmanship: Broad Church
- Website: https://www.stmaryredcliffe.co.uk

History
- Founded: c. 1158
- Dedication: Mary, Mother of Jesus

Architecture
- Functional status: Active
- Heritage designation: Grade I
- Designated: 8 January 1959
- Style: Early English Gothic, Decorated Gothic, Perpendicular Gothic, Gothic Revival
- Years built: 1185-1872

Specifications
- Length: 250 ft (76 m): 274 feet (84 m) including weathervane

Administration
- Province: Canterbury
- Diocese: Bristol
- Archdeaconry: Bristol
- Deanery: Bristol South
- Parish: St Mary Redcliffe with Temple Bristol and St John the Baptist, Bedminster

The Church of St Mary the Virgin, widely known as St Mary Redcliffe, is the main Church of England parish church for the Redcliffe district of the city of Bristol, England. The first reference to a church on the site appears in 1158, with the present building dating from 1185 to 1872. The church is considered one of the country's finest and largest parish churches as well as an outstanding example of English Gothic architecture. The church is so large it is sometimes mistaken for Bristol Cathedral by tourists. The building has Grade I listed status, the highest possible category, by Historic England.

The church is notable for its many large stained glass windows, decorative stone vaults, flying buttresses, rare hexagonal porch and massive Gothic spire. With a height of 274 feet (84 m) to the top of the weathervane, St Mary Redcliffe is the second-tallest structure in Bristol and the sixth-tallest parish church in the country. The church spire is a major Bristol landmark, visible from across the city and, until the completion of Castle Park View in 2020, it was the tallest structure ever to have been erected in Bristol.

St Mary Redcliffe has received widespread critical acclaim from various architects, historians, poets, writers and monarchs. In 1541 the English topographer and antiquary John Leland, claimed it was "the most beautiful of all churches" he had seen in England. Queen Elizabeth I, on a visit to the church in 1574, was said to have described St Mary Redcliffe as "The fairest, goodliest and most famous parish church in England". In 1628 Charles I similarly suggested that the church was "one of the moste famous absolute fayrest and goodliest parish churches within the Realm of England.”

Simon Jenkins gives St Mary Redcliffe the maximum five-star rating in his book 'England's Thousand Best Churches', one of only eighteen to receive such a rating, describing it as a "masterpiece of English Gothic"; and Nikolaus Pevsner says that "St Mary Redcliffe need not fear comparison with any other English parish church".

== History ==
=== Name and origins ===
Though some sources claim a church has been on the site since Saxon times, no such church is recorded in the Domesday Book, meaning that if a church existed, it had been demolished by 1086 (or had been accidentally omitted). The first recorded mention of a church in present-day Redcliffe is a charter signed by Henry II in 1158, confirming the endowments of the churches at Redcliffe and Bedminster to Old Sarum Cathedral. This charter implies therefore that a church already existed in Redcliffe during 1158, likely constructed sometime between 1086 and 1158.

The modern-day name of Redcliffe, now a district of Bristol, refers to the position of the church on its prominent red sandstone cliff above the River Avon, which at the time was the location of the Port of Bristol. The original church was built and funded by the city's wealthy merchants, some of whom may have reached present-day North America before Christopher Columbus, sailing from the Port of Bristol. Though the modern Port of Bristol is located further downstream, the original quayside still survives near the church, called Redcliffe Quay, where fragments of the red cliff can still be seen.

=== Gothic rebuilding ===
In 1185, a new north porch was constructed in the Early English Gothic style of the Purbeck subtype, similar to the new east end of Canterbury Cathedral, making this one of the earliest Gothic constructions in England, Canterbury being the earliest. Though repairs are recorded in the churchwardens' accounts in 1207, 1229 and 1230, the next major construction would not be undertaken until the end of the 13th century.

Nave, looking east

In 1292, Simon de Burton, mayor of Bristol, founded the present church and began an ambitious programme of rebuilding. This began in 1294 with the construction of the massive northwest tower base and part of the present west wall. Construction paused until 1320 when the rest of the church was rebuilt into the Decorated Gothic style. The earliest work from this phase of construction is the exceptionally rare hexagonal north porch, which was built adjacent to the 1185 Early English porch in 1325, thus forming an inner (1185) and outer (1325) north porch.

The design influence for the unusual hexagonal shape of the north porch is unknown, with historians offering various suggestions. These include the Chapter House and Lady Chapel of nearby Wells Cathedral, constructed from 1310 onwards, which are the nearest example of similar work. Pevsner also suggests influences from Chinese and Islamic art and architecture, since frequent voyages were made to the east in this period. Islamic architecture contains frequent polygons and it is possible that given the Port of Bristol being amongst the largest and most important in England at the time, inspiration was sought from further afield.

From c. 1330, the south porch and nave aisle began to be rebuilt in the Decorated style, though with notable markings of the future Perpendicular style, which was soon to become the dominant style from the late 14th century onwards. Influences from Wells Cathedral can again be found here, most notably in the south porch, constructed in 1335. Construction continued with the completion of the tower and spire in the first half of the 14th century, followed by the south transept and then the Lady Chapel, the latter completed in 1385.

Though historians do not agree on precisely when it took place, there is a notable change in architectural style when comparing the north and south transepts with the choir and nave. The choir was most likely complete by the time of the Black Death in 1348 and though the north transept is built on a similar plan to the south transept, its internal features indicate a time when the Perpendicular style had succeeded the Decorated as the dominant style of architecture, most notably in the clerestory.

=== 15th century ===
The completion of the nave was the major task left at the beginning of the 15th century. The elevation of the nave walls is of a similar design to that of the choir but the interior vaulting is different, implying it is of a later date. Work continued on the nave and crossing during the first half of the 15th century until it was interrupted in 1445 or 1446 by the fall of the spire.

Though the exact year is uncertain, the top of the spire is recorded to have been struck by lightning in one of these two years. Meteorological records kept at the University of East Anglia make reference to storms with thunder and lightning in November and December 1446. This strike caused the top two-thirds of the spire to collapse, leaving St Mary Redcliffe with a stump-like spire, similar to the present-day appearance of St Mary's Church in nearby Yatton.

It is unknown whether any damage was caused by the fall of the spire, though it is reported. If the wind had been from the southwest, the spire would have fallen onto the north porches, which show no sign of damage or alteration. If the wind had been from the northwest, the spire would have fallen onto the south porch, which does show signs of later alteration, with a vault of later design than the exterior elevation. Surviving evidence in the tower roof shows the spire did not fall down vertically, for the tower roof beams supporting the spire have been dated to the 14th century and they would not have survived such a collapse. William Worcestre's 1480 inventory states: "the height of the tower of Redcliffe contains 300 feet, of which 100 feet have been thrown down by lightning". The spire was not rebuilt following the strike; work instead continued to the nave and crossing, completed in c. 1480. The crossing vault bears similarities to that at Salisbury Cathedral, dated to 1479, which given the close relationship between the two churches, likely inspired that at Redcliffe. The work to complete the nave at Redcliffe was largely financed by the Canynges family, who had worked to rebuild the church since the early 14th century.

The final major alteration to the church in the Gothic period was the extension of the Lady Chapel in 1494 by Sir John Juyn, a wealthy barrister. Though the extension took place over 100 years after the initial completion of the chapel, the extension work is harmonious in design with the original.

=== 16th and 17th centuries ===
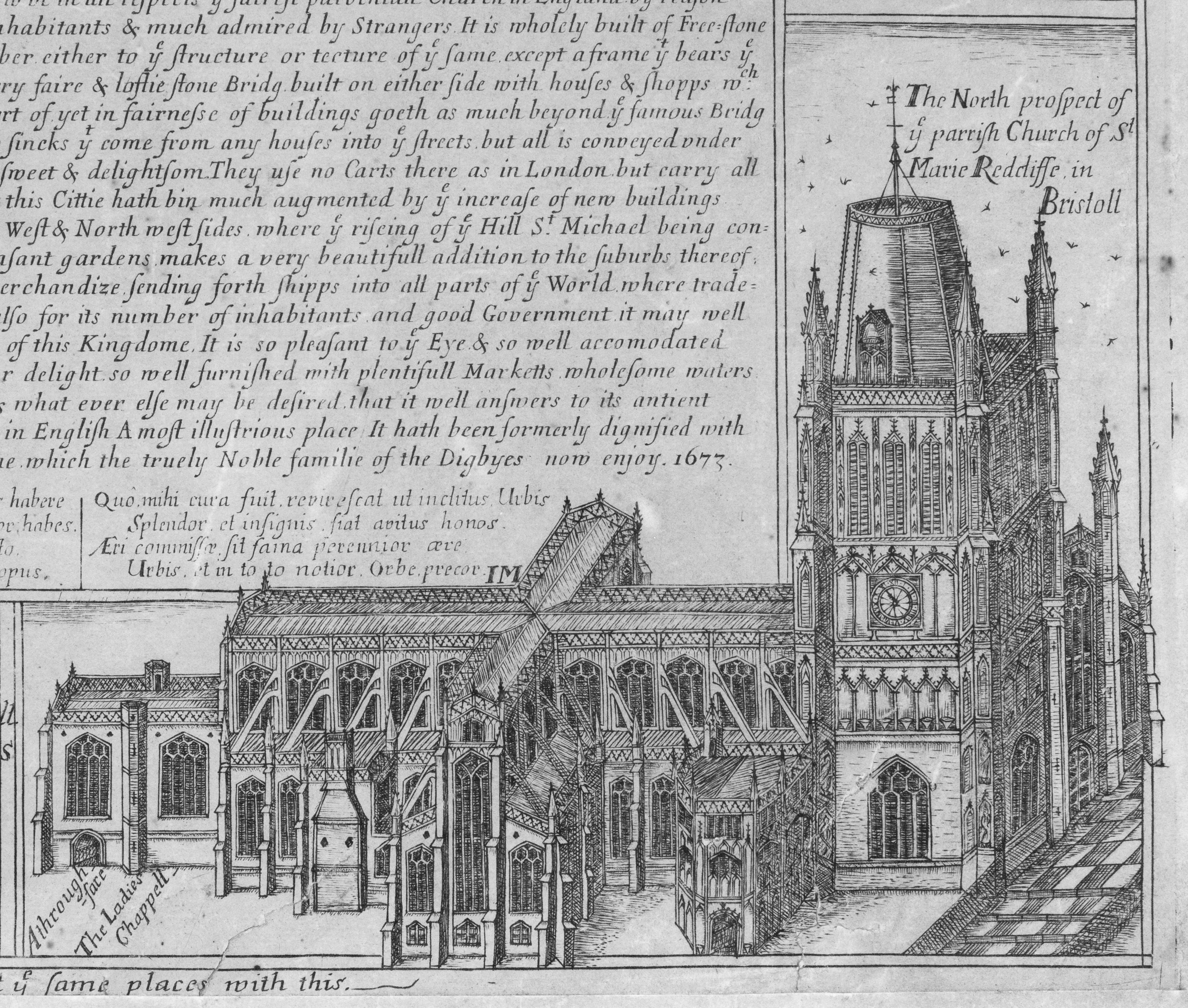
The North prospect of the parrish Church of St Marie Redcliffe in Bristoll (1728)

Like many churches in England, substantial damage was done to the internal fittings in the 16th and 17th centuries. During 1547, the chantry chapels were dissolved, including those founded at the end of the 15th century by William Canynges. The crown confiscated plates, lamps, vestments and service books. The rood screen was destroyed in 1548.

Sometime in 1574, Queen Elizabeth I made the first of several visits to St Mary Redcliffe, reputedly describing it as "the fairest, goodliest and most famous parish church in England", though whether she actually said this is a matter of some debate. Elizabeth would make several more visits during her reign, most notably in 1588 and 1591 when she restored some of the funds confiscated by her predecessors; this she did by issuing Letters Patent.

More serious damage would come to the church during the 17th century. From 1649 to 1660, during the time of Oliver Cromwell as Lord Protector, the pinnacles were removed, ornaments destroyed, the organ broken and much of the stained glass smashed by artillery fire. Similar damage was done to many churches across the country. The removal of the pinnacles destabilised parts of the building; as the flying buttresses are not just decorative, but support the vaulting and the upper walls. The east window was bricked up to try to stop the collapse of the quire walls, as were some of the flying buttresses.

=== Modern history ===
==== 18th and 19th centuries ====
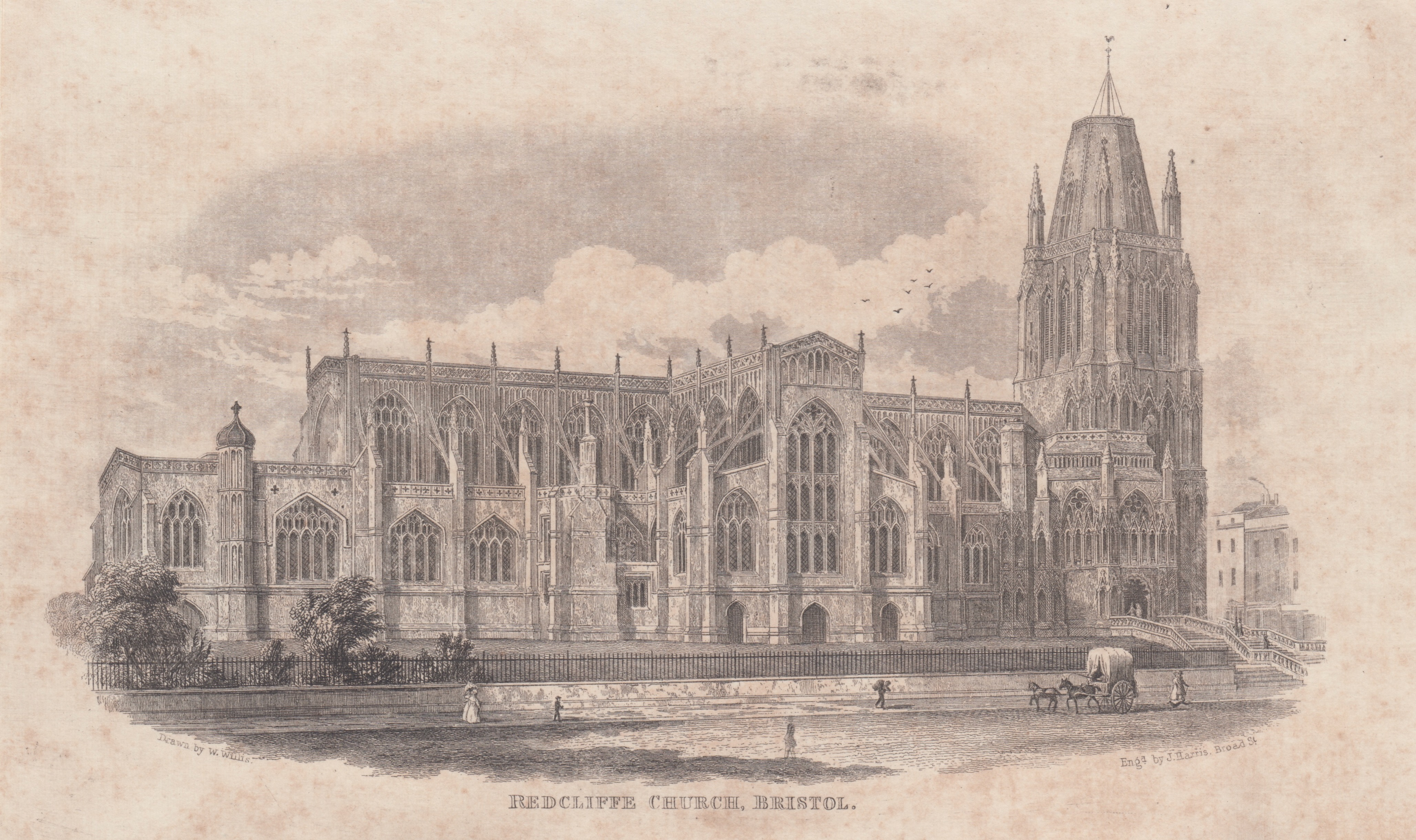
St Mary Redcliffe Church, c.1830s

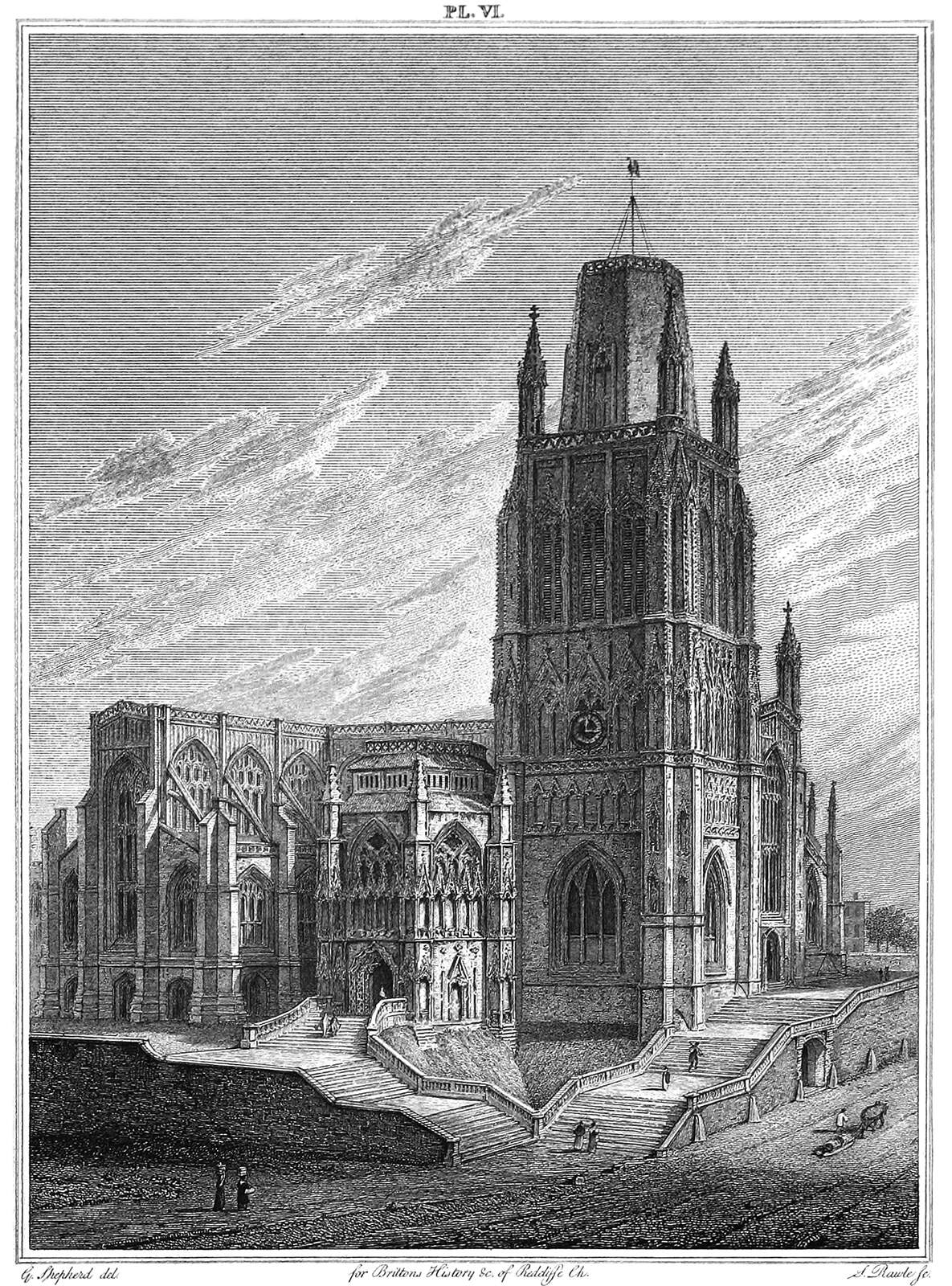
St Mary Redcliffe in the early 19th century, showing truncated spire

In 1763, the chapel of the Holy Spirit, as well as the Churchyard Cross, were both demolished. The chapel of the Holy Spirit was a freestanding building constructed in the mid-13th century by Henry Tussun, who was Prebendary at nearby Bedminster. The chapel stood a short distance southwest of the present tower, and was used as the parish church whilst the present building was under construction. Queen Elizabeth later gave it to the parishioners for use as a grammar school but it fell into disuse. Demolition lasted until 1766.

The church was heavily restored again during the latter half of the 19th century. Concerned for the state of the building, which had suffered with decades of decay and misuse, a committee was formed in 1842 under the name of the Canynges Society to restore the building and return it to its original appearance. As part of the restoration, the east window was unblocked and reglazed, the high box pews and galleries of the Georgian era removed and the stonework generally restored. The final step in this restoration was the rebuilding of the spire, which had stood in truncated form above the tower since it was struck by lightning in 1445 or 1446. The spire was rebuilt and the remaining 'stump' restored back to its former height; the Mayor of Bristol completing the work by placing the capstone on 9 May 1872, over 260 feet (79 m) above the ground. This work which cost over £40,000 (equivalent to £3.4 million in 2022) was designed and overseen by architect George Godwin.

==== 20th century ====
In 1912, the present highly acclaimed organ by Durham-based Harrison and Harrison was constructed and installed in the church, replacing several earlier instruments by Bristolian organ builders (see Organ, below). From 1939 to 1941, a new undercroft in the Gothic-style was constructed by George Oatley underneath the north porch, originally intended to be used as the treasury.

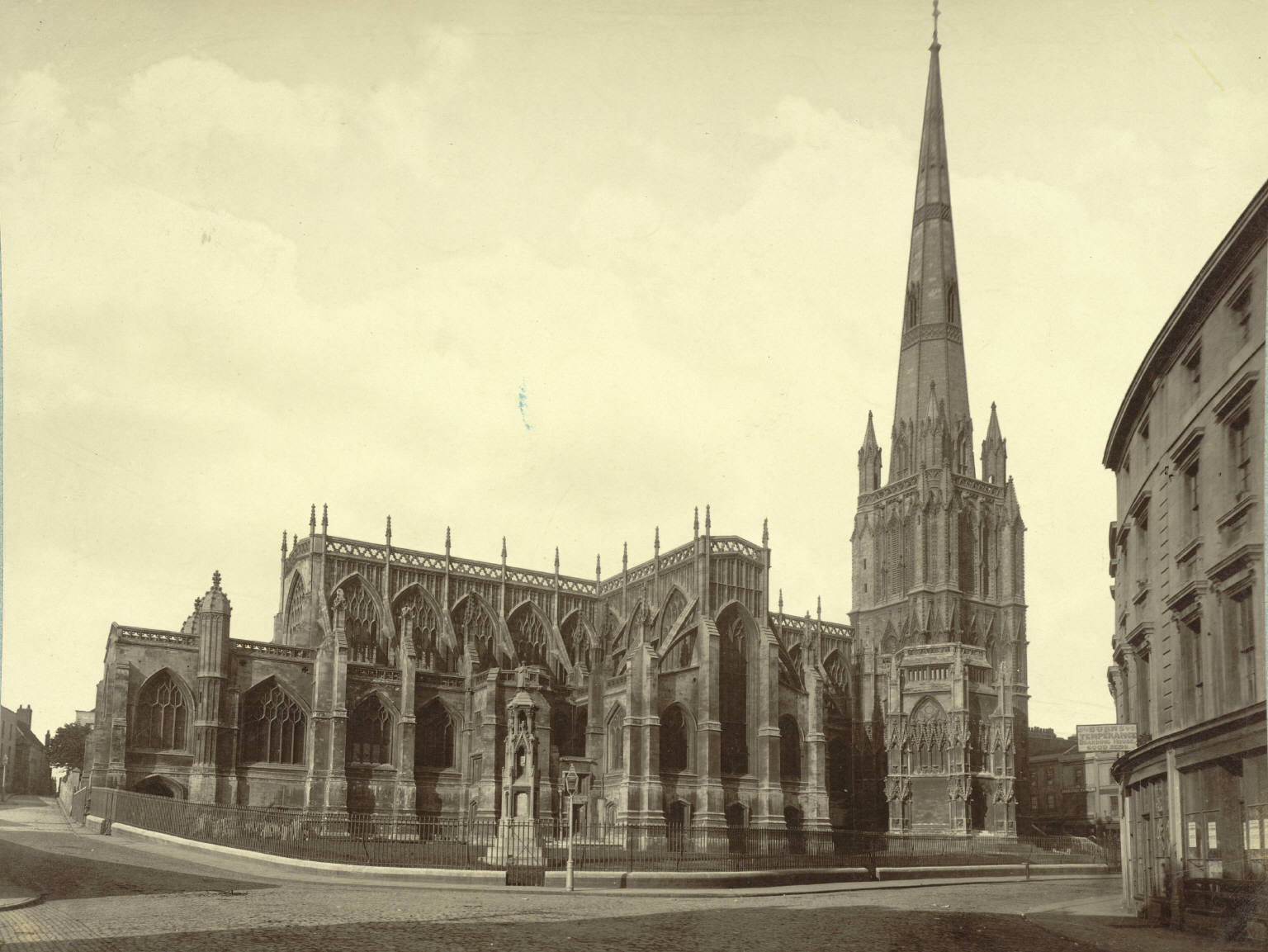
St Mary Redcliffe in the late 1890s following restoration and before Redcliffe Way was constructed

During the Second World War, the church, despite its size and height making it an easy target for the Luftwaffe, was mostly spared from destruction, unlike many of Bristol's churches. Nevertheless, a team of watchmen were stationed on the church roof at night to put out incendiary bombs. The church's bells and other treasures were stored under the floor in sandbags to protect them from 1941 to 1944 and minor damage was sustained on a small number of occasions, mostly to the organs and roofs, though the upper (inner) north porch room was burnt out.

The church did however come very close to more significant destruction on Good Friday in 1941, when a bomb dropped on a nearby street threw shrapnel, including a large chunk of tram rail, into the churchyard. The tram rail, which has been left there to this day, is partially embedded in the ground with the force of the explosion and serves to remind local residents of how close the church came to destruction.

In the 1960s, the five vivid stained glass windows in the Lady Chapel were installed, designed and manufactured by Harry Stammers, and at the same time, £150,000 was spent between 1960 and 1965 on cleaning the external stonework.

==== 21st century ====
The 21st century has seen much restoration to the exterior stonework, much of it being cleaned, 150 years of pollution having darkened the stonework. The organ has undergone a significant restoration by its original builders, Harrison and Harrison, and some stained glass commemorating the Royal African Company was removed in June 2020 following the removal of the Statue of Edward Colston on 7 June. The south nave aisle and lady chapel roofs have been renewed.

A project to celebrate the 450th anniversary of the visit of Elizabeth I in 2024 was underway to make the church more suitable for hosting tourists, events and for supporting the community. In 2016, an architectural competition was run by the church to design a new welcome centre with fresh and modern facilities; the contest was won by Purcell, who received the contract to design the work. Part of the work includes the pedestrianisation of Redcliffe Way, the dual carriageway which runs past the north side of the church. As of 2023, Purcell have departed ways with the church, with Northern Irish architects Hall McKnight taking over the project. No construction work has so far taken place.

== Architecture ==
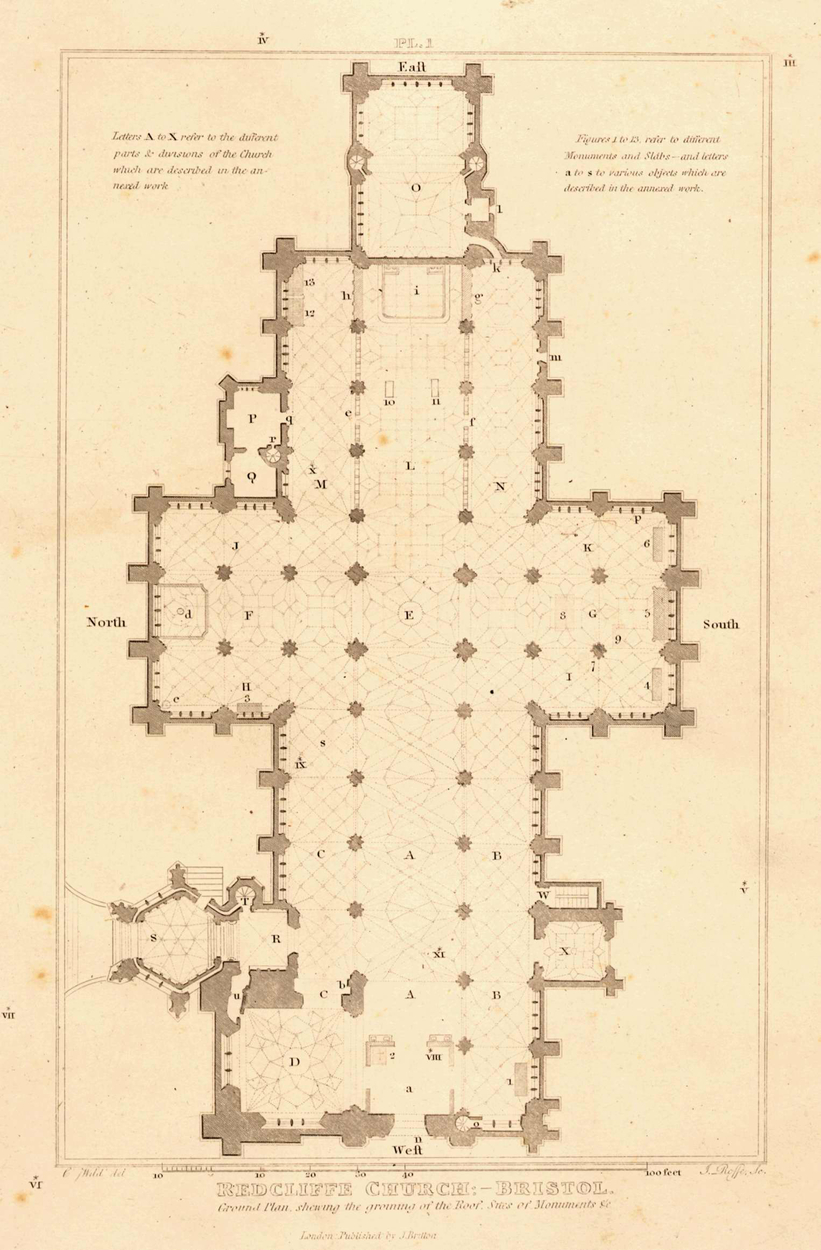
Floor plan

=== Plan ===
The church has a traditional cruciform plan, with northwest tower, nave, transepts and chancel, as is common with many parish churches in England. However, more unusually, the form it takes is more akin to that of a cathedral than a parish church, with aisles on all four arms of the church, as well as a lady chapel to the east and two porches. Other parish churches with such an arrangement can be found at Beverley Minster in East Riding of Yorkshire, Christchurch Priory in Dorset and Selby Abbey in North Yorkshire. However, St Mary Redcliffe is unique for its double north porch, with both an inner and outer room, the latter taking a rare polygonal form.

The scale of the building makes it not only one of the primary landmarks for the city of Bristol but also one of the largest parish churches in the country. The church building is 250 feet (76 m) long from east to west and 117 feet (36 m) across the transepts from north to south, giving it an area of 1,916 square metres (20,620 sq ft). The footprint of the church is amongst the largest of any church in England when cathedrals and other former monastic structures such as Bath Abbey are excluded, after only Great Yarmouth Minster (2,752 sq m), Hull Minster (2,473 sq m), Boston Stump (2,417 sq m) and Newark-on-Trent (2,010 sq m).

=== Exterior ===
==== Tower ====
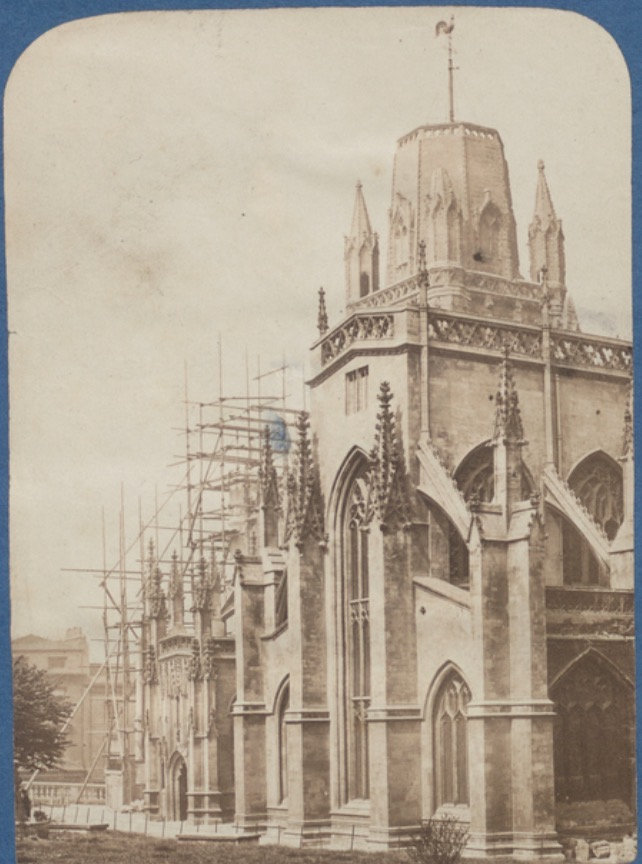
Photograph of the church in 1869, before the reconstruction of the spire

The dominant feature of the church's exterior is the highly decorative and imposing northwest tower, capped by an extremely tall and slender spire. The earliest parts of the tower which comprise the lowest stage date from circa 1294, built in the Late Geometrical style. This part of the tower was an addition to the incarnation of the building begun in c. 1185, and was constructed on a massive scale, with walls 7 feet (2.1 m) thick and 35 feet (11 m) long. The lower stage, which reaches a height of 34 feet (10 m), contains a seven-bay niche-filled arcade containing fourteen statues by William Rice in the 19th century restoration. Below this arcade are two large windows, one each on the north and west sides, formed of three and four lights respectively, framed by massive buttresses complete with filleted angle shafts. This lowest stage of the tower partially juts into the north porch, with the 1325 hexagonal outer porch built around one of the tower buttresses.

The second stage of the tower is highly ornate and is almost as tall as the older stage below it, being some 33 feet (10 m) high from the bottom of the lower stage to the top of the second. This second stage was not begun until the early 14th century and subsequently shows a later period of architecture than the stage beneath it. This stage of the tower, containing the ringing room, has a large blind arcade that runs all the way around the tower, formed of 3 arches with y-shaped tracery in gabled hoods containing 19th century statues of the Apostles. Each arch has elaborate mouldings punctured with cabbage roses and daisy-like florets on the gables. The central arch on the east, north and west sides contain large glazed window, that of the south side blocked by the nave.

The third and highest stage of the tower contains the belfry and is similar in age to the second, being constructed in the Perpendicular Gothic style. This stage, being some 44 feet (13 m) high contains triplets of huge louvred belfry openings which take up nearly the entire width and height of each wall, showing the verticality common in the late Gothic period. These louvred windows have cinque-foil headed lights separated by slender blind arches, all heavily crocketed. The buttresses which started on the lowest stage also terminate here with crocketed pyramids. The third stage is topped by a pierced stone parapet formed of open triangles and gargoyles, with octagonal pinnacles rising from it. The parapet of the tower is 111 feet (34 m) above the ground; the octagonal corner pinnacles reach 139 feet (42 m) above the ground.

==== Spire ====
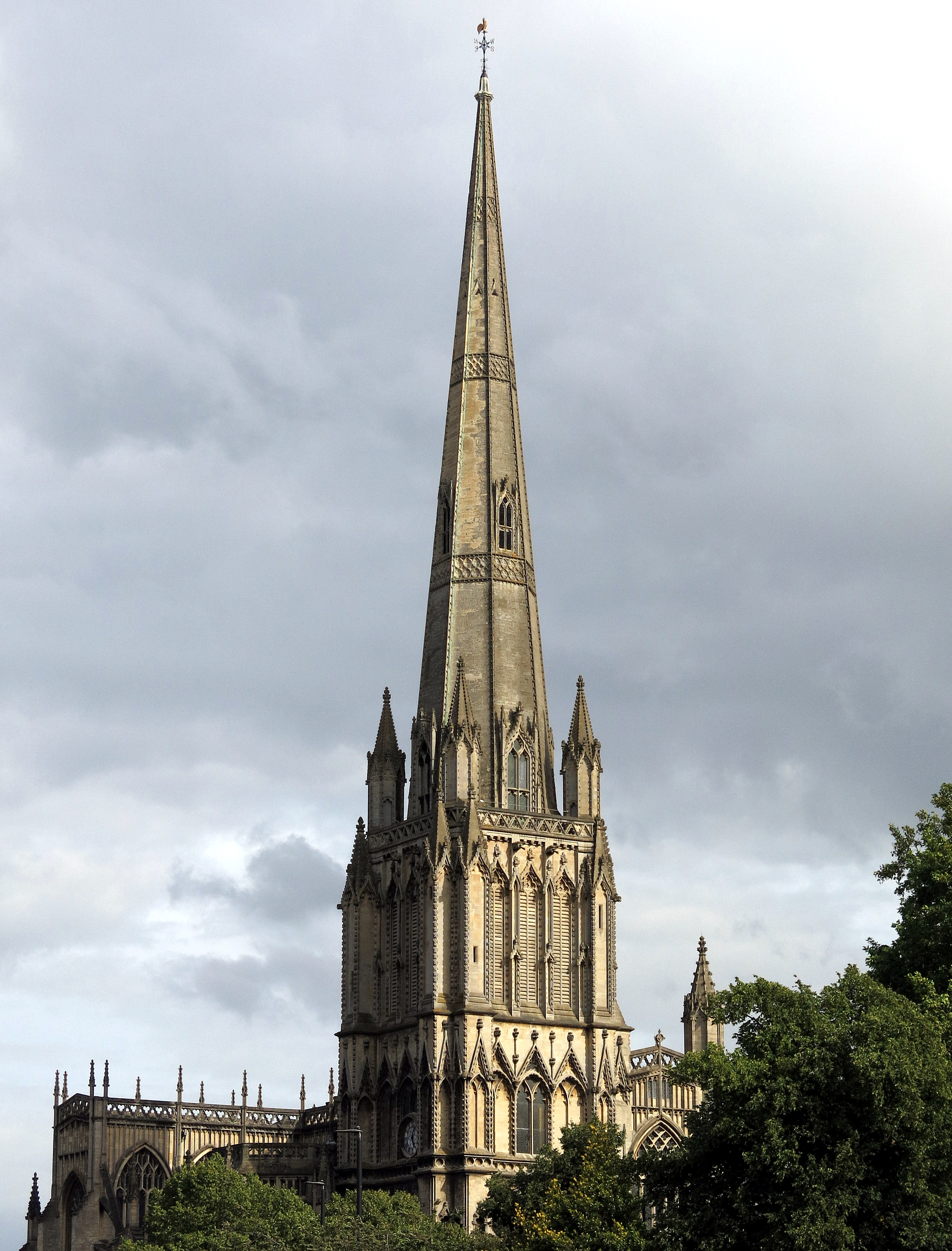
The tower and spire from the west

The first spire on the tower at Redcliffe was completed by circa 1335, and stood for just over 110 years until it was severely damaged by a storm in either 1445 or 1446, toppling the upper part of it. To what extent the spire was damaged is unknown, for conflicting accounts appear from its destruction as to how much of it was left. William Worcestre recorded in a visit to the church in 1478 that "the height of the tower at Redcliffe measures 300 feet, of which 100 feet have been thrown down by lightning". However, this contradicts the images and paintings of the church in the 19th century, which show the tower capped by a short stump, implying it was either taken down or further reduced in height. The tallest medieval work in the present spire is 139 feet (42 m) above the ground, the position of which matches the appearance of the church in the 19th century.

As part of the 19th century restoration of the church by George Godwin, the rebuilding of the spire was undertaken as the final part of the work, from 1870 to 1872. Godwin's design was more restrained than previous architects' drawings for its rebuilding, taking its inspiration from that at Salisbury Cathedral; perhaps ironic, as the original spire may have directly inspired Salisbury's, given the close link between the two churches. The spire stands 152 feet (46 m) tall on top of the roof of the tower, giving a total height to the capstone of 262 feet (80 m), and when the weathervane is included, 274 feet (84 m). The spire's height is commonly misquoted as 292 feet (89 m), which comes from an appendix attached to the book 'Notes on the Church of St Mary Redcliffe' by Revd J. P. Norris in 1878. This figure includes the deep foundations as well as the weathervane which has led to St Mary Redcliffe frequently being called the third tallest parish church in England.

Whilst the spire is very large, the church is not the third tallest parish church in England. It ranks as the 15th-tallest church in the United Kingdom, and the 6th-tallest parish church, surpassed in the respect of the latter by the churches of St Walburge in Preston, St James in Louth, St Wulfram in Grantham, St Elphin in Warrington and St Mary Abbots in Kensington. It is also the second tallest church in South West England, surpassed only by Salisbury Cathedral.

==== North porch ====
The north porch at St Mary Redcliffe is formed of two parts, an earlier 12th century inner porch and a much more elaborate 14th century outer porch. The outer porch is the only one visible from the exterior and dates from circa 1325. The outer porch is the most celebrated part of the current building as well as one of its greatest treasures, being one of only three medieval hexagonal porches in existence in England. The exterior is dominated by massive pentagonal turret buttresses with square pinnacles rising the full height of the porch.

The outer porch has three stages of unequal height: the lowest stage contains the main doorway which has a seven-pointed double-chamfered entrance arch, a feature author Simon Jenkins calls "astonishing". The arch is inspired by Oriental architecture and features exceptionally intricate decoration of seaweed foliage. The second stage has a large row of four blind arcades filled with niches containing 19th century replicas of the original statues, above which are large four-light windows. The upper stage contains the Chatterton Room, and is a low room lit by rows of mullion windows. The parapet has open quatrefoils and is reached by an octagonal stair turret in the southeast corner.

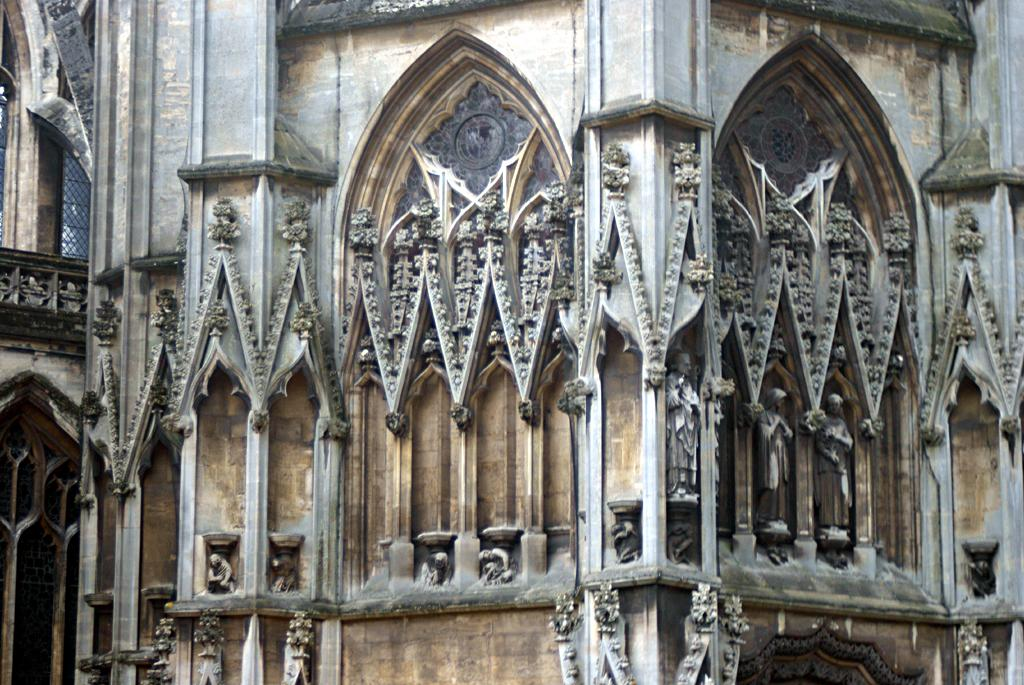
North porch: upper stages

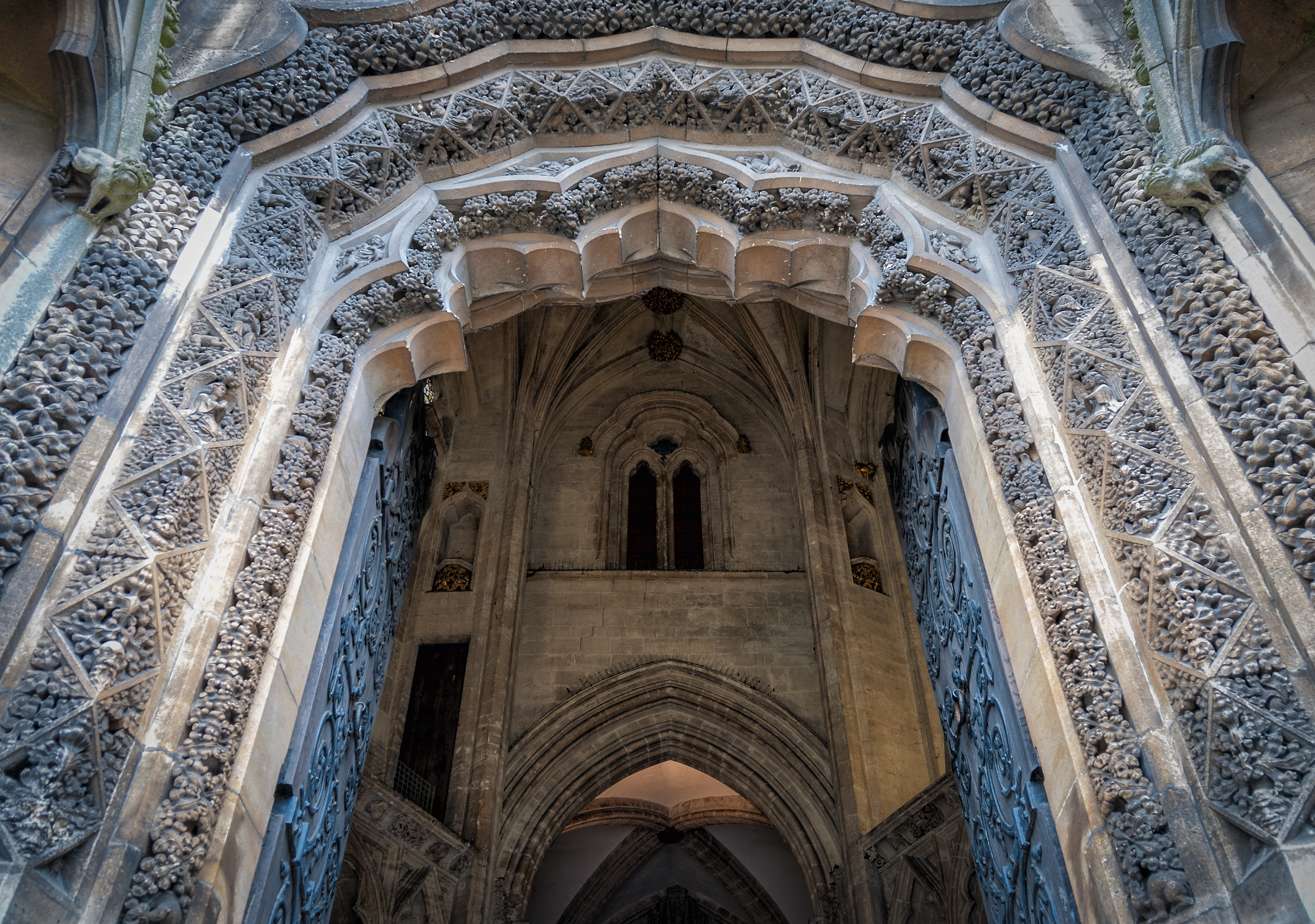
Detail on door decoration

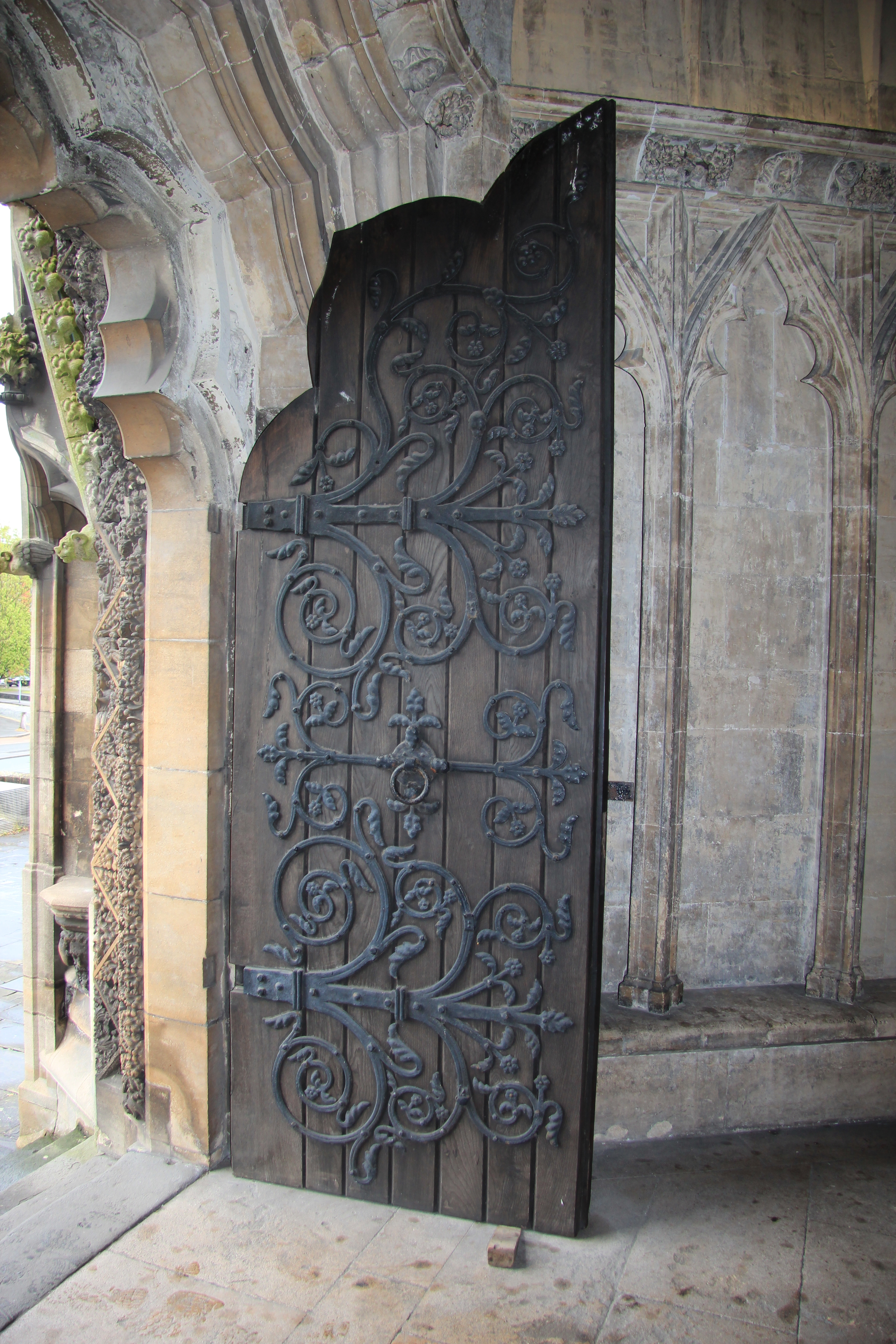
Door detail

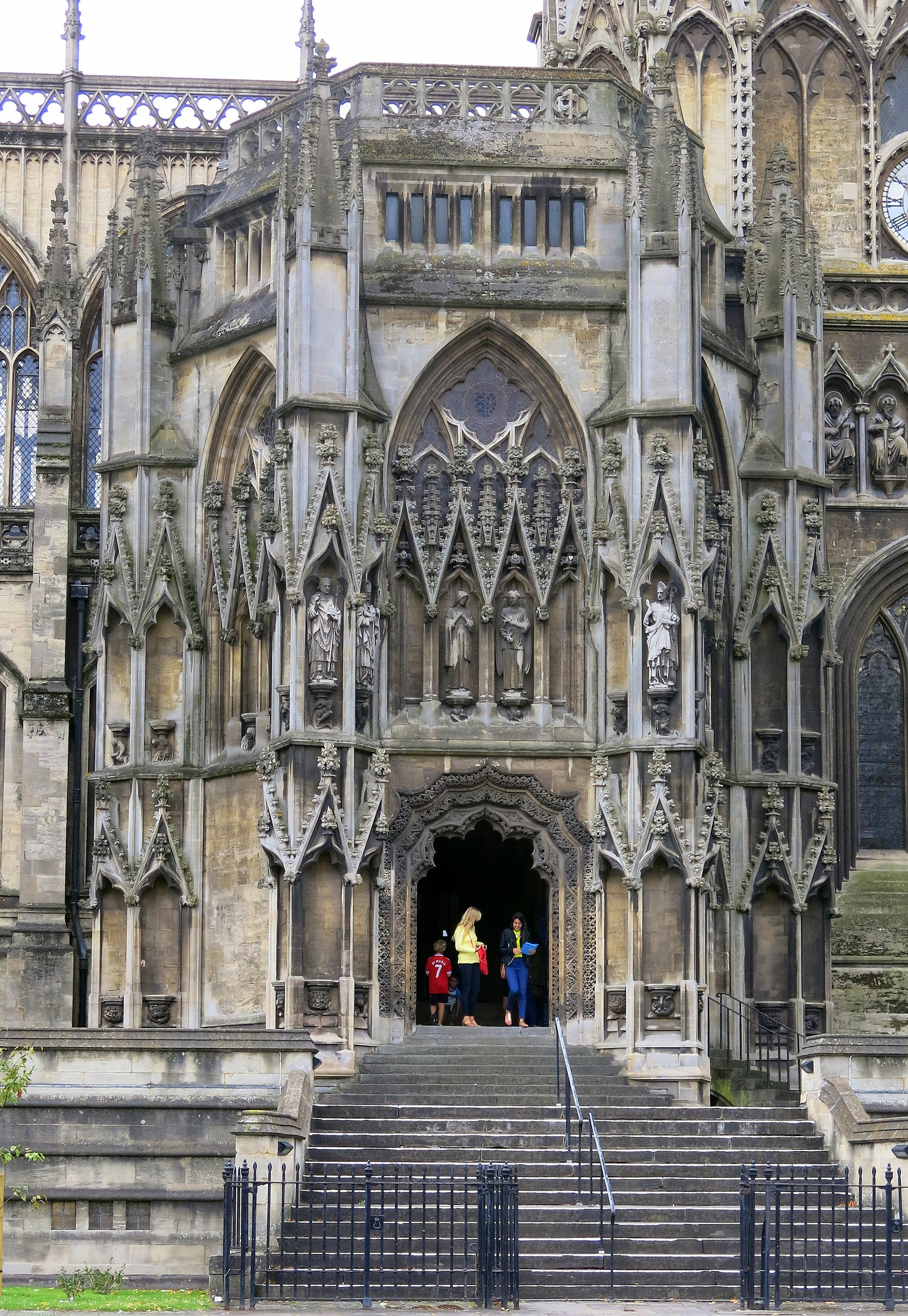
Porch from the north, showing flight of steps and position near tower

==== Nave, transepts and chancel ====
The main body of the church generally dates from the late Decorated and early Perpendicular Gothic periods of the mid-14th century and thus presents a unified and consistent style throughout. The aisles all have blind quatrefoil parapets divided by buttresses, from which rise crocketed pinnacles and 4-light Decorated windows. The clerestory of the main body is supported by massive flying buttresses which spring from the aisle buttresses. Between each buttress are very large 6-light windows filling almost the entire space of the clerestory wall, of the alternating tracery type. The upper walls also have an open parapet but formed of open-cusped triangles, above which rise thin, crocketed pinnacles.

The south and north transepts are unusually double-aisled, an arrangement scarcely seen outside of cathedral buildings and each one is three bays in length. The two transepts differ slightly in design due to the north transept being a slightly later imitation of the 1335 south transept. The south transept has gabled buttresses to the aisles and flying buttresses to the clerestory, which unlike that of the nave or chancel, is unpanelled. The clerestory windows are smaller than their counterparts in the main body and have a different design to the rest of the church, featuring a central arch of three lights surrounded by a band of glazed quatrefoils. The north transept more closely resembles the nave and chancel, with the same design of clerestory window.

The chancel continues the same design as the nave but the north aisle is partially blocked by the two bay organ chamber, which has mullioned windows with trefoiled heads and a wide chimney breast. East of the chancel is the two bay lady chapel, built in two sections, firstly at the end of the 14th century from circa 1385 and then extended at the end of the 15th century in 1494. The chapel has a large five-light window in its westernmost bay, corresponding with the earlier period of building, and a smaller four-light window in the eastern bay. The eastern gable of the chapel has a wide but low six-light Perpendicular window.

All four arms of the church have large or very large windows in their gable ends. The west window is a tall five-light construction, divided into two tiers by transoms, featuring cinquefoil-headed crosses. The north and south transept gable ends have "immensely tall" four-light windows divided into three tiers by two rows of transoms featuring Y-tracery and reticulated tracery in the arch heads. The chancel gable is filled almost entirely by a substantial seven-light window of the alternate tracery design.

The vault in the North Porch of St Mary Redcliffe in Bristol dates back to 1325. Similar to the wooden vault in the crossing at Ely Cathedral, it is a centralised tierceron vault; however, it is stone and hexagonal rather than octagonal. From each bay, positioned between the window heads, four tiercerons spring, yet none of them extend all the way to the central boss. Instead, they connect to one of six transverse ridge rib segments, with the inner joints linked by a lierne hexagon surrounding the central boss. The bosses themselves are large, gilded, and foliate, standing out against the grey stone. In each bay, the two tiercerons on either side of the severies meet the transverse rib that extends from the window head, crossing the vault and passing through the central hexagon, producing three continuous transverse ridge ribs. The vault’s surface consists of folds that form flat planes, overlaid with a palimpsest of patterns. Overall, the vault’s appearance resembles a snowflake or a design seen in a kaleidoscope.

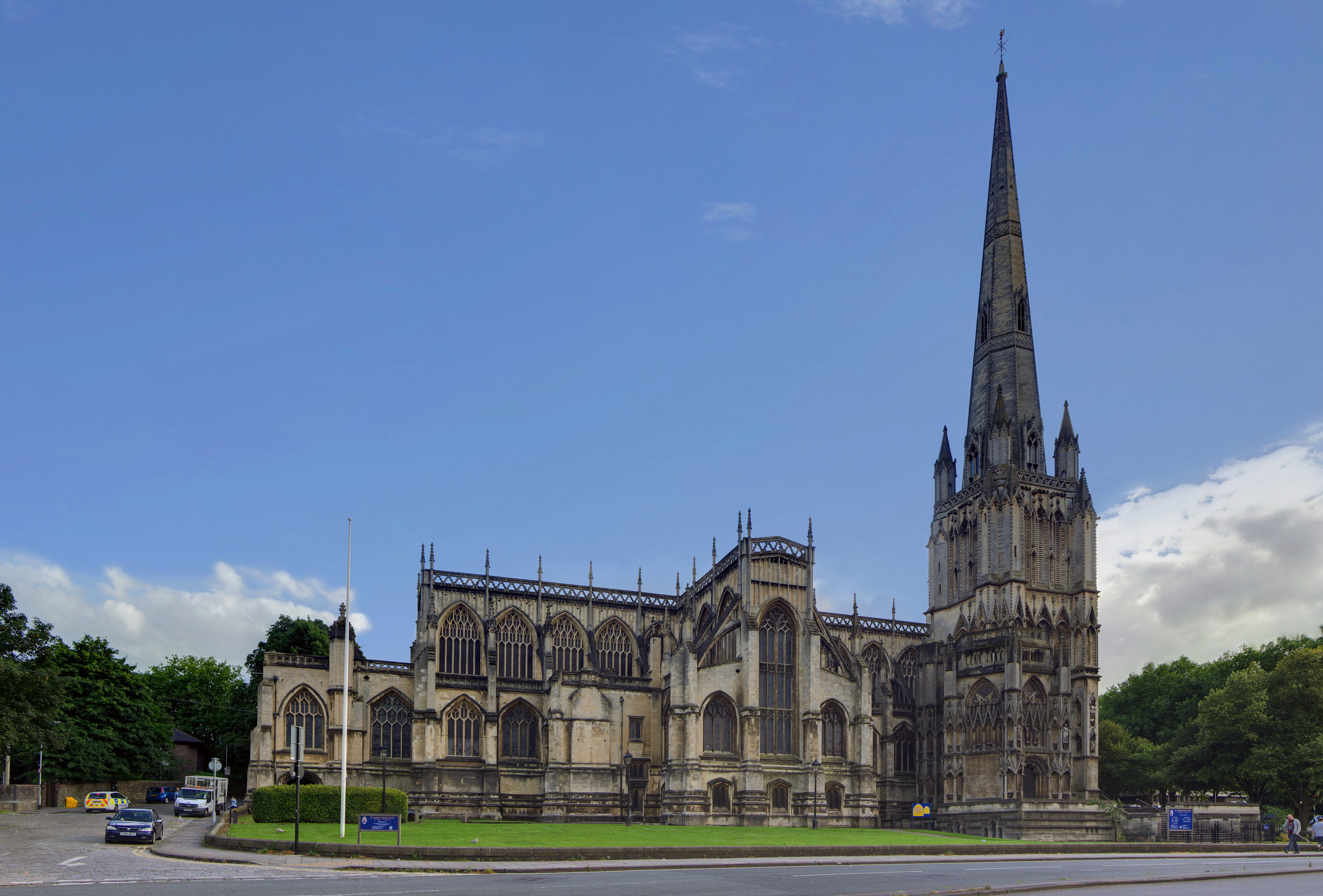
North aspect

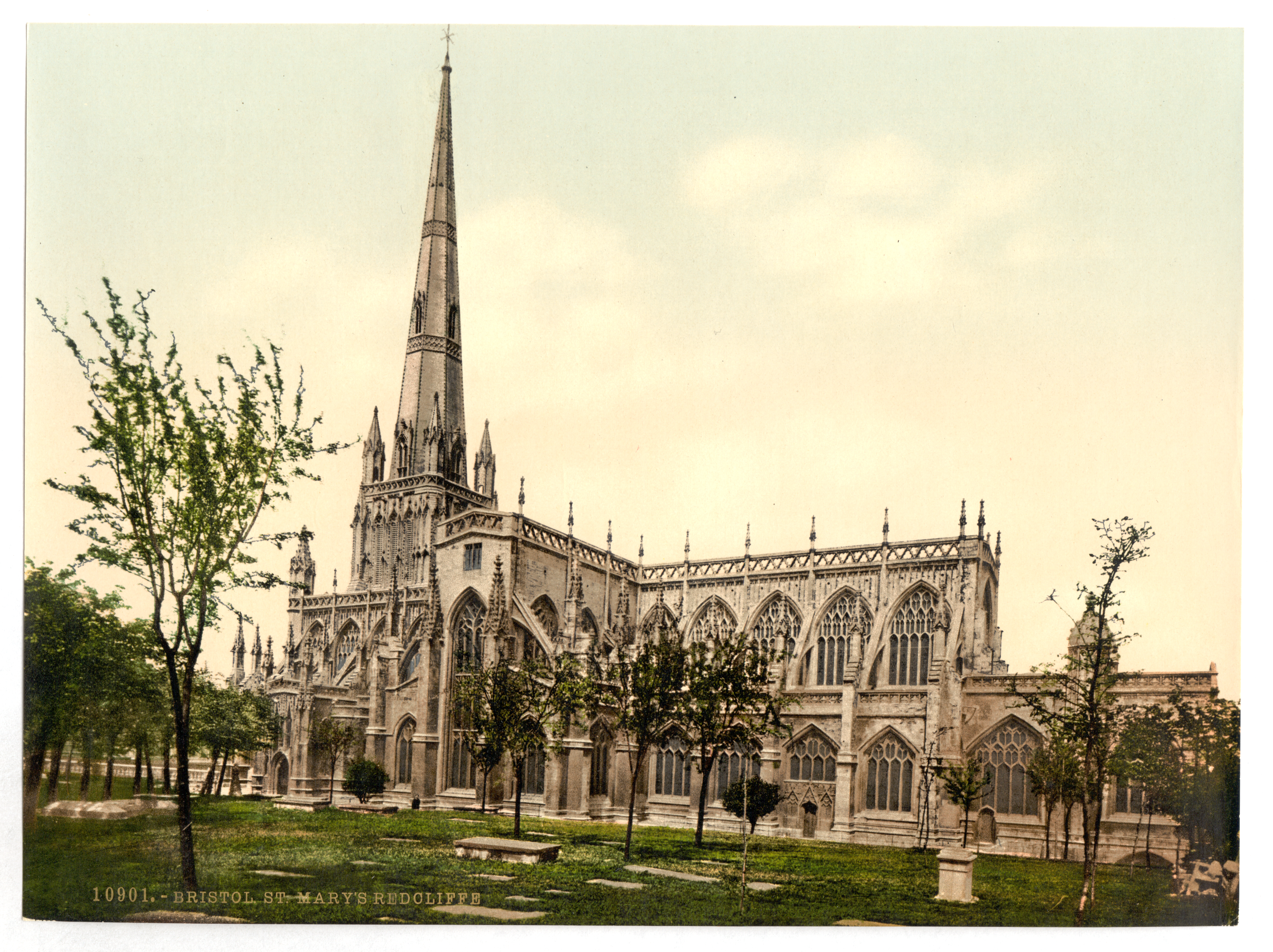
South aspect (1890)

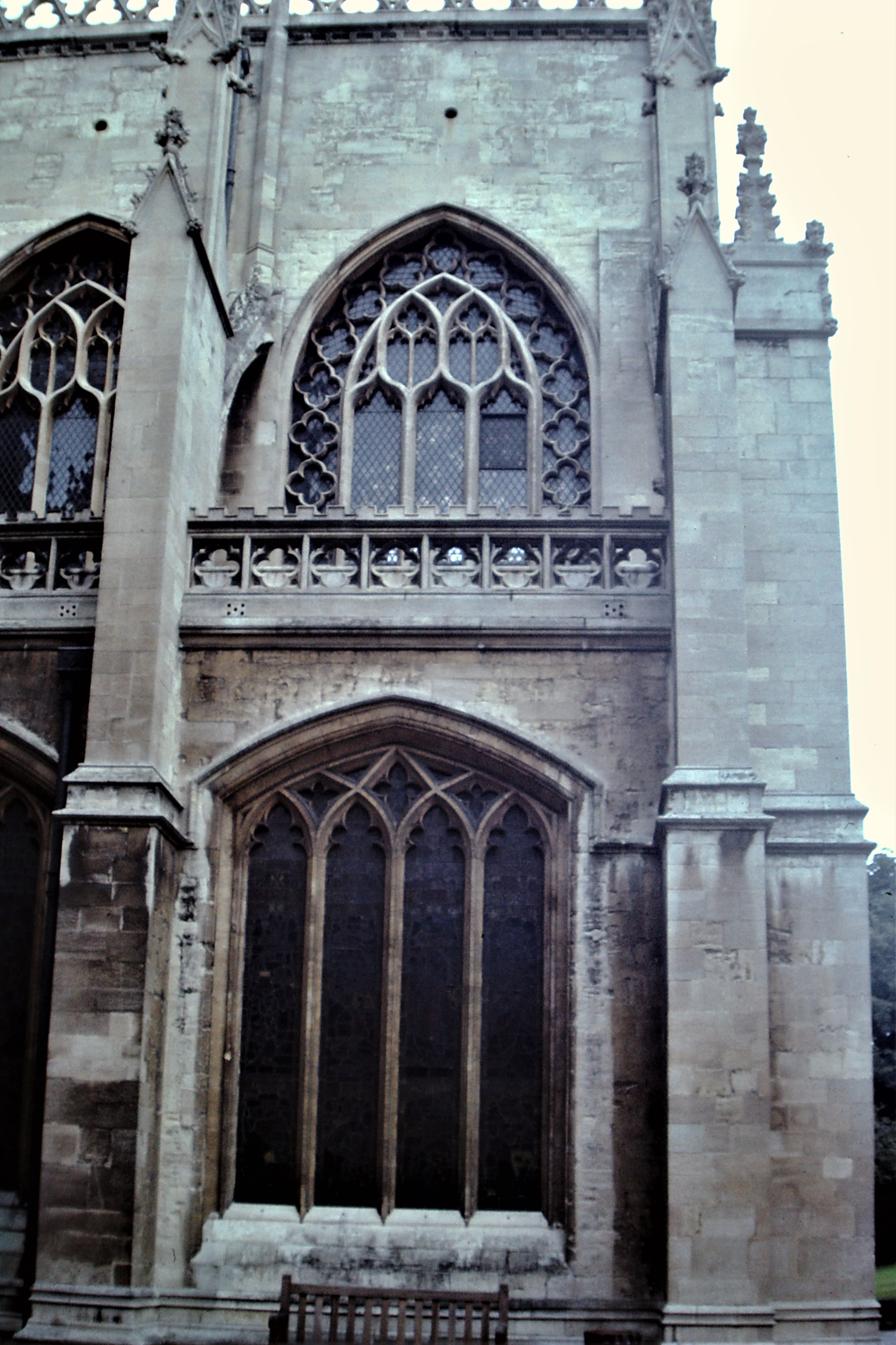
South transept windows

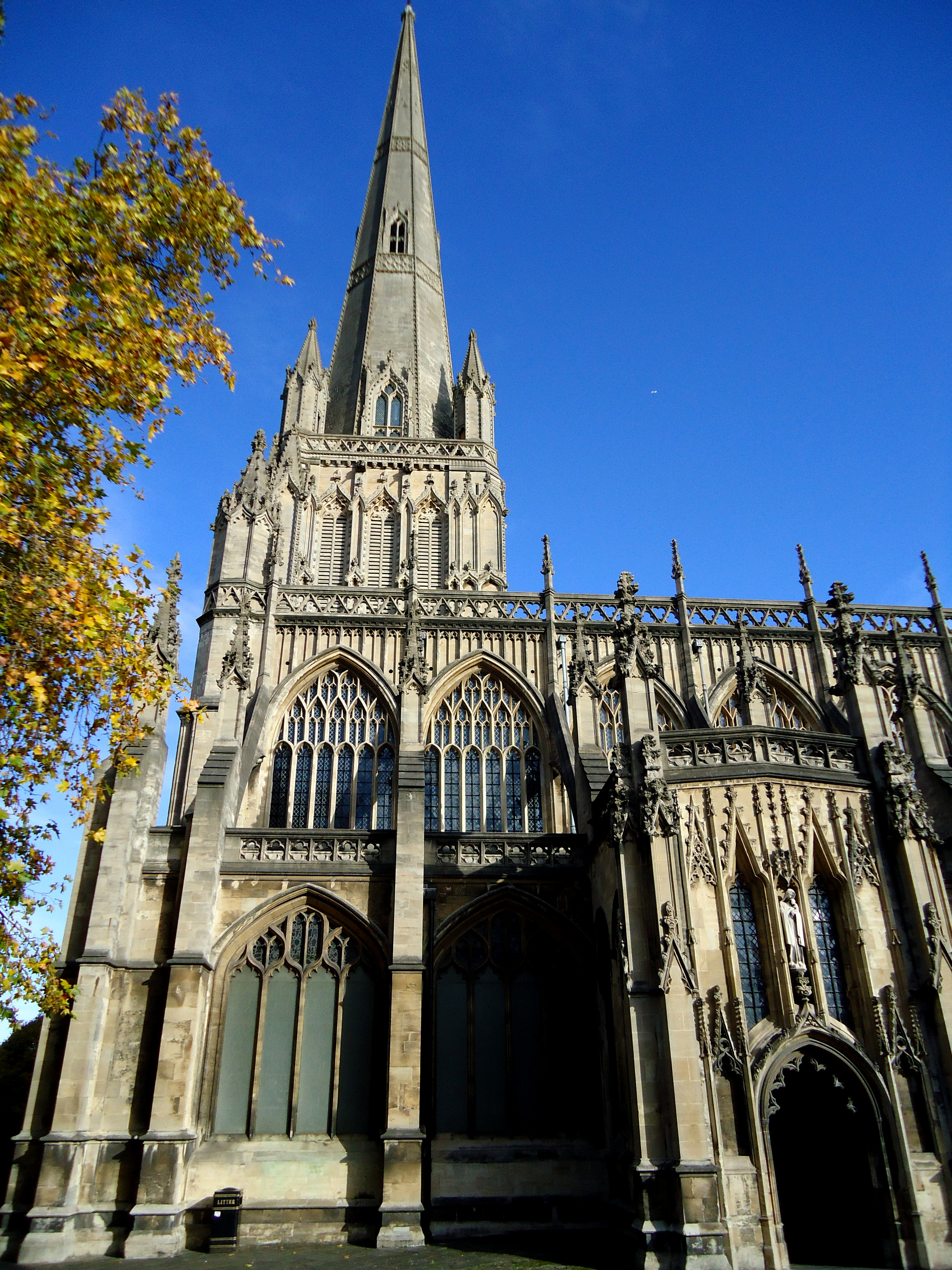
South nave and porch

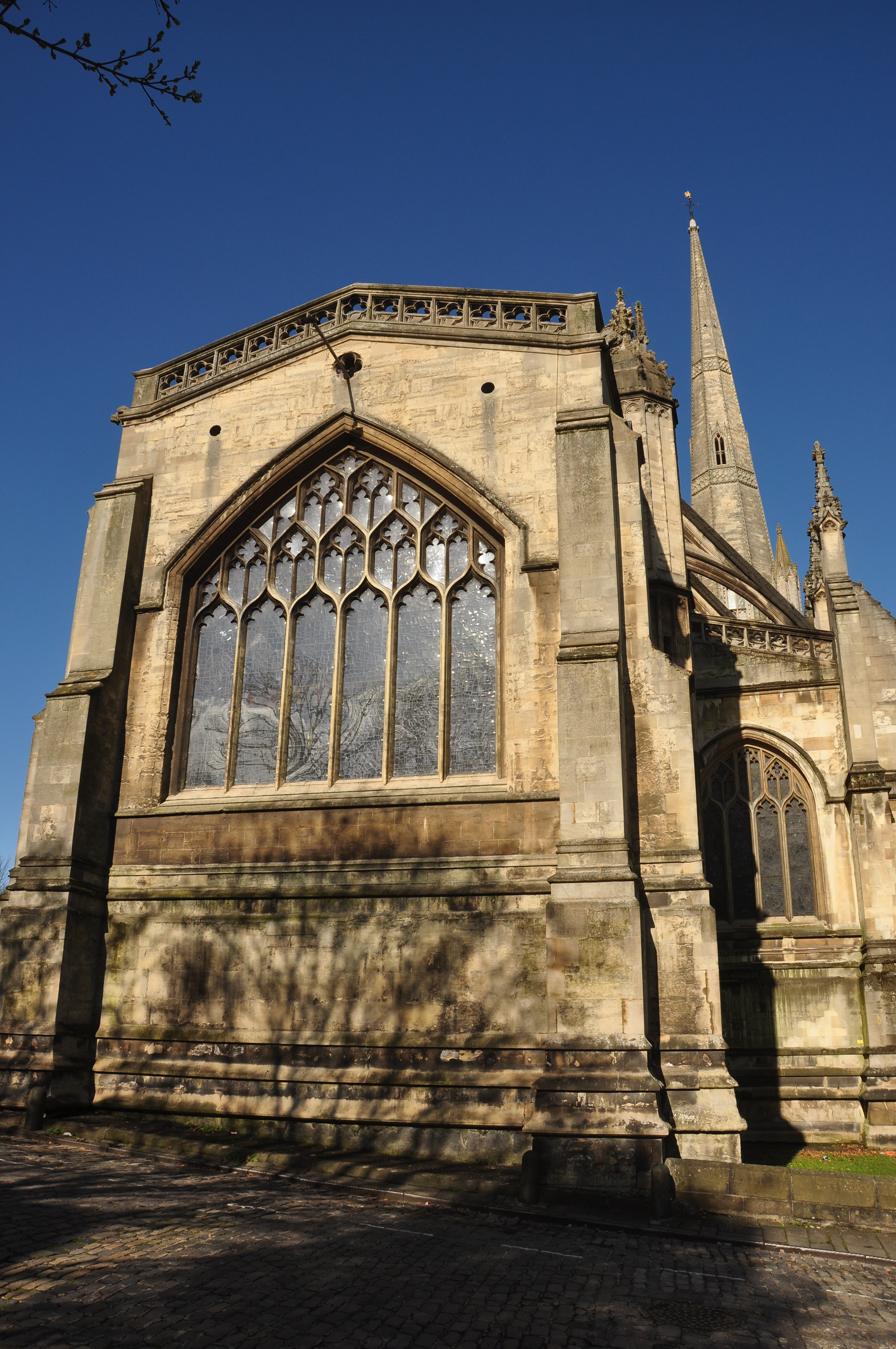
Lady Chapel eastern gable

=== Interior ===
==== Vaults ====
One of the rare qualities of St Mary Redcliffe is that it is vaulted entirely in stone, which makes it unique; there is no other parish church in England to feature a medieval stone vault throughout. The earliest vault in the church is that of the inner north porch dating back to circa 1185, taking the form of a simple ribbed vault, similar to that at Durham Cathedral, in the Transitional/Early English style. The outer porch, built from circa 1325, has a much more elaborate hexagonal vault in the form of a six-sided star.

The main body of the church is vaulted nearly entirely in the lierne form, with varying rib designs, including lozenges in the nave, hexagons in the south aisle, squares in the transepts and rectangles in the choir. These are formed by various combinations of ribs intersecting one another, in a pattern that Simon Jenkins calls "an astonishing maze". The nave vaulting contains over a thousand carved and gilded bosses, either 1,100 or 1,200 in number depending on the source. These bosses depict various scenes and objects, including saints, biblical scenes and people associated with the building of the church.

There are two other notable vaults in the church, including the star vault of the Lady Chapel dating from the late 14th century and the five-sided star vault underneath the tower, which an archaeological survey has dated to the late 1460s or early 1470s. Most of the vaults were repainted in the 1980s and 1990s and have bright shades of green, gold, blue and red.

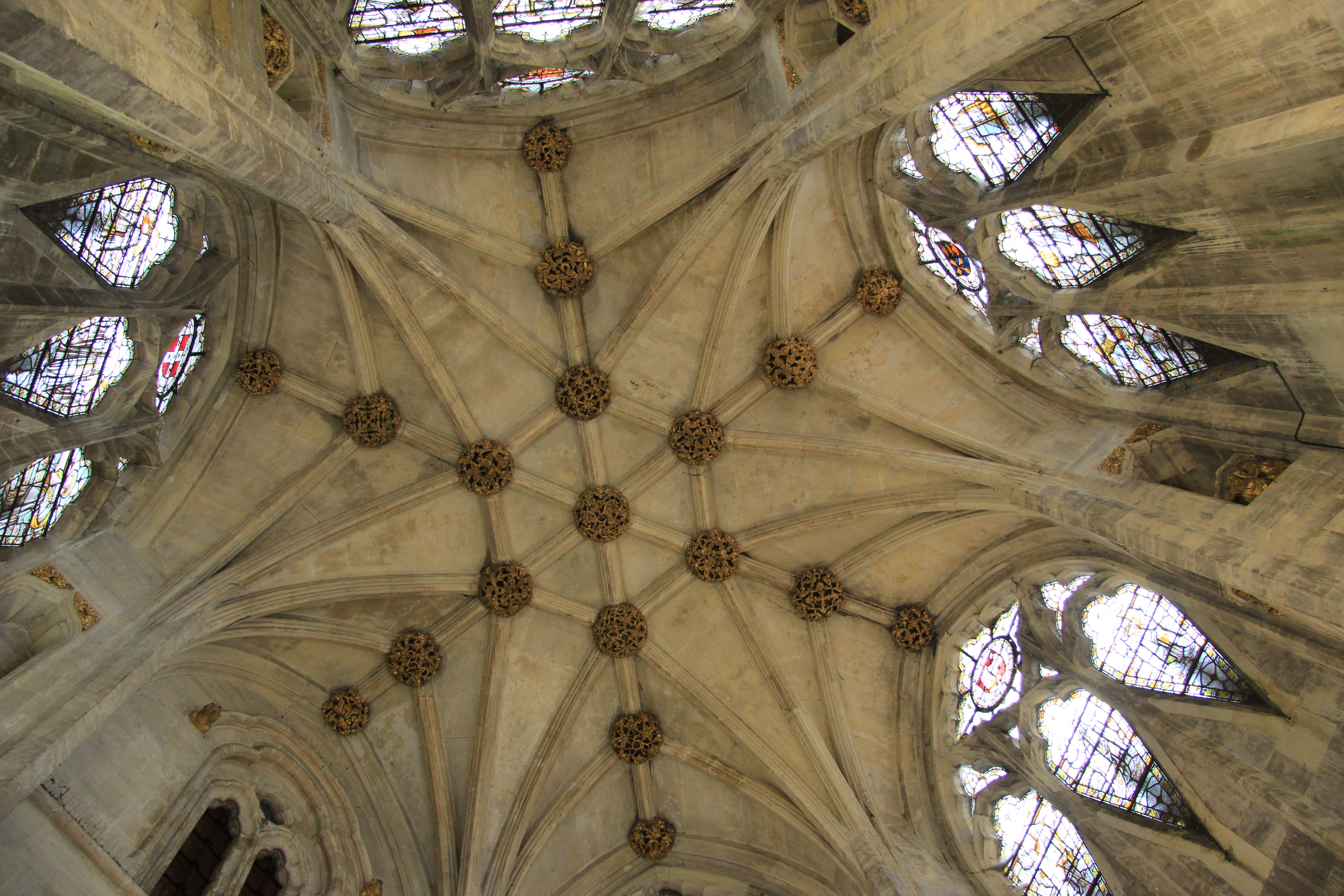
Outer north porch vault (1325)

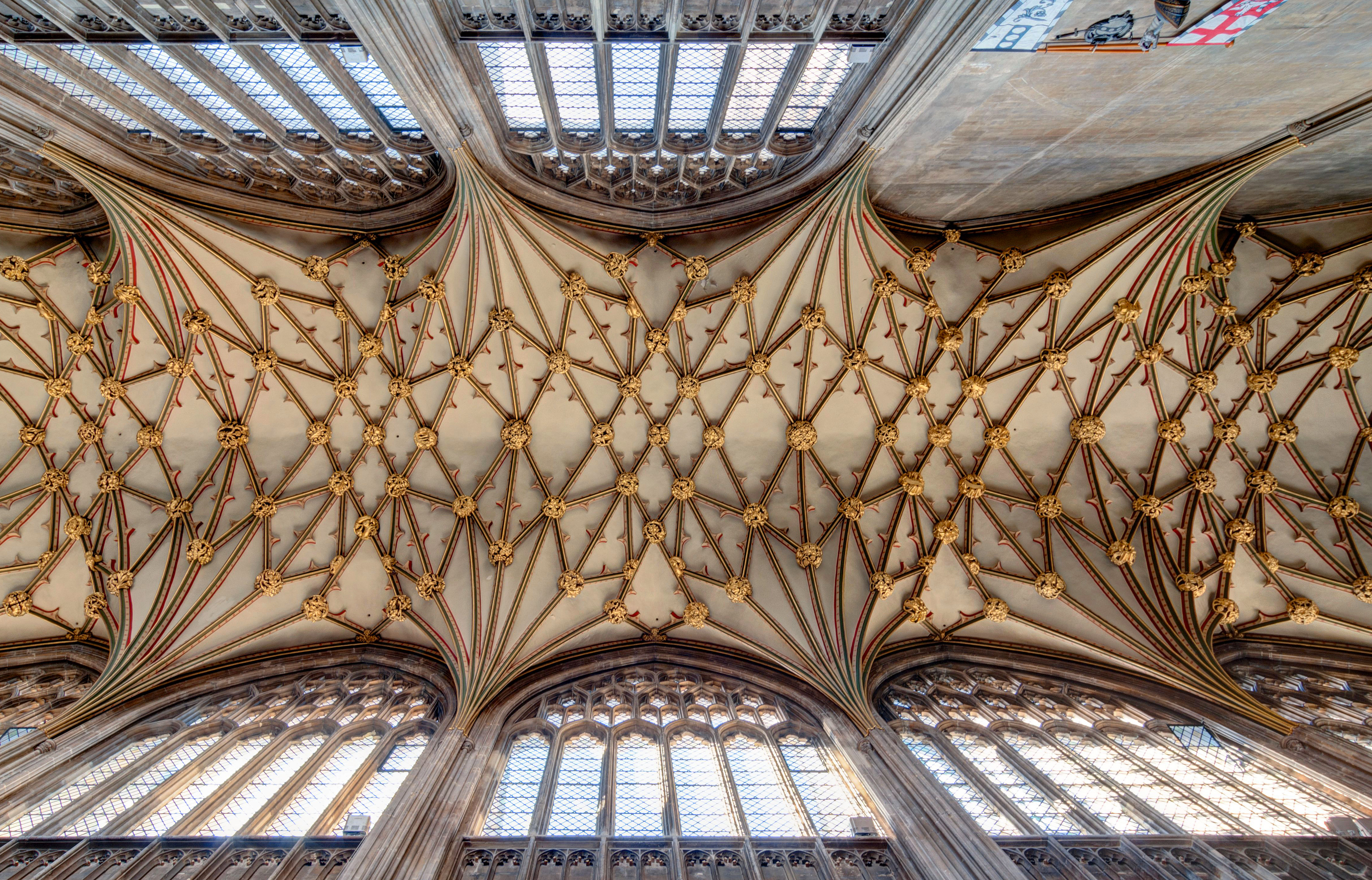
Nave vault

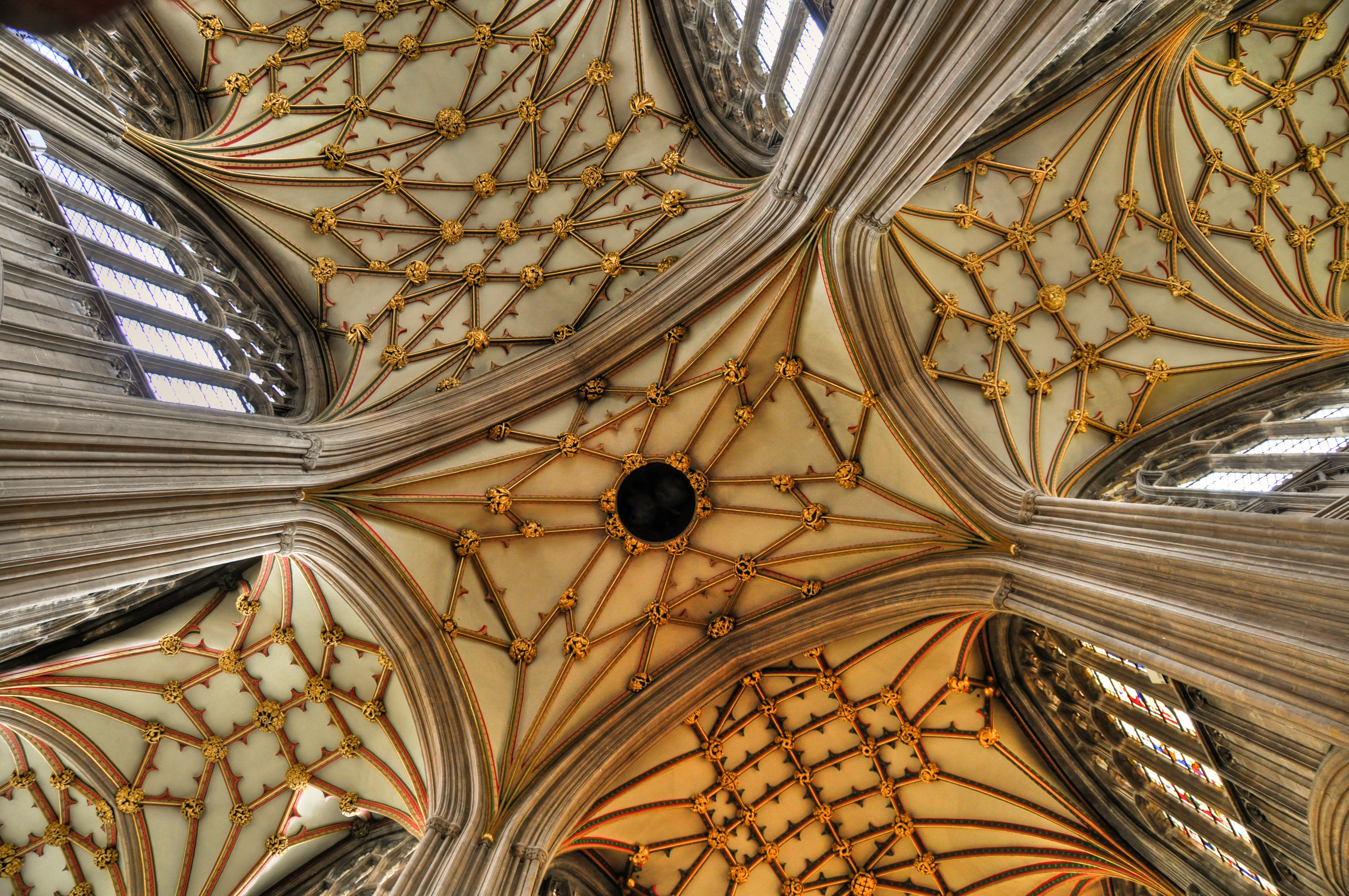
Crossing vault

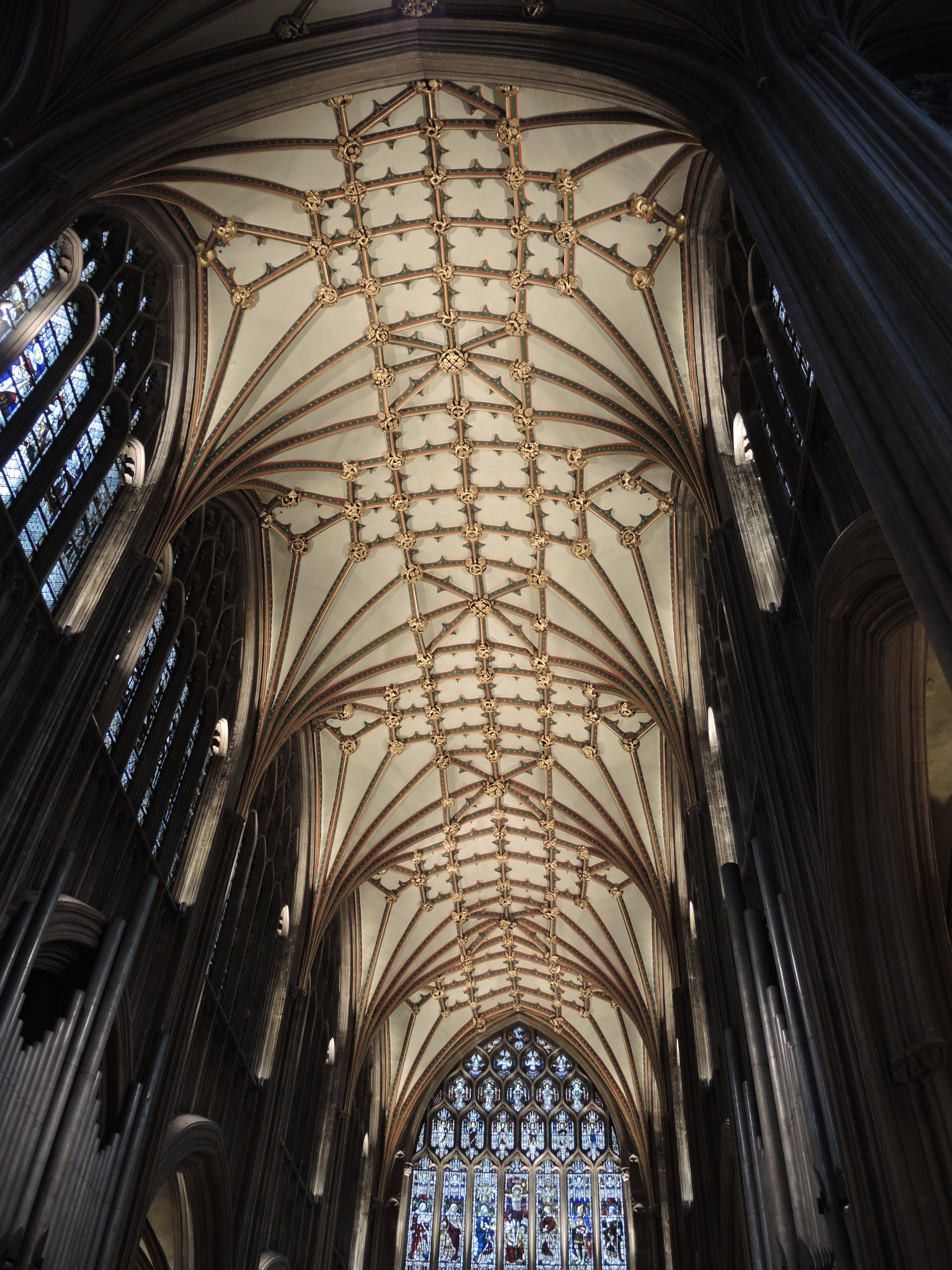
Quire vault

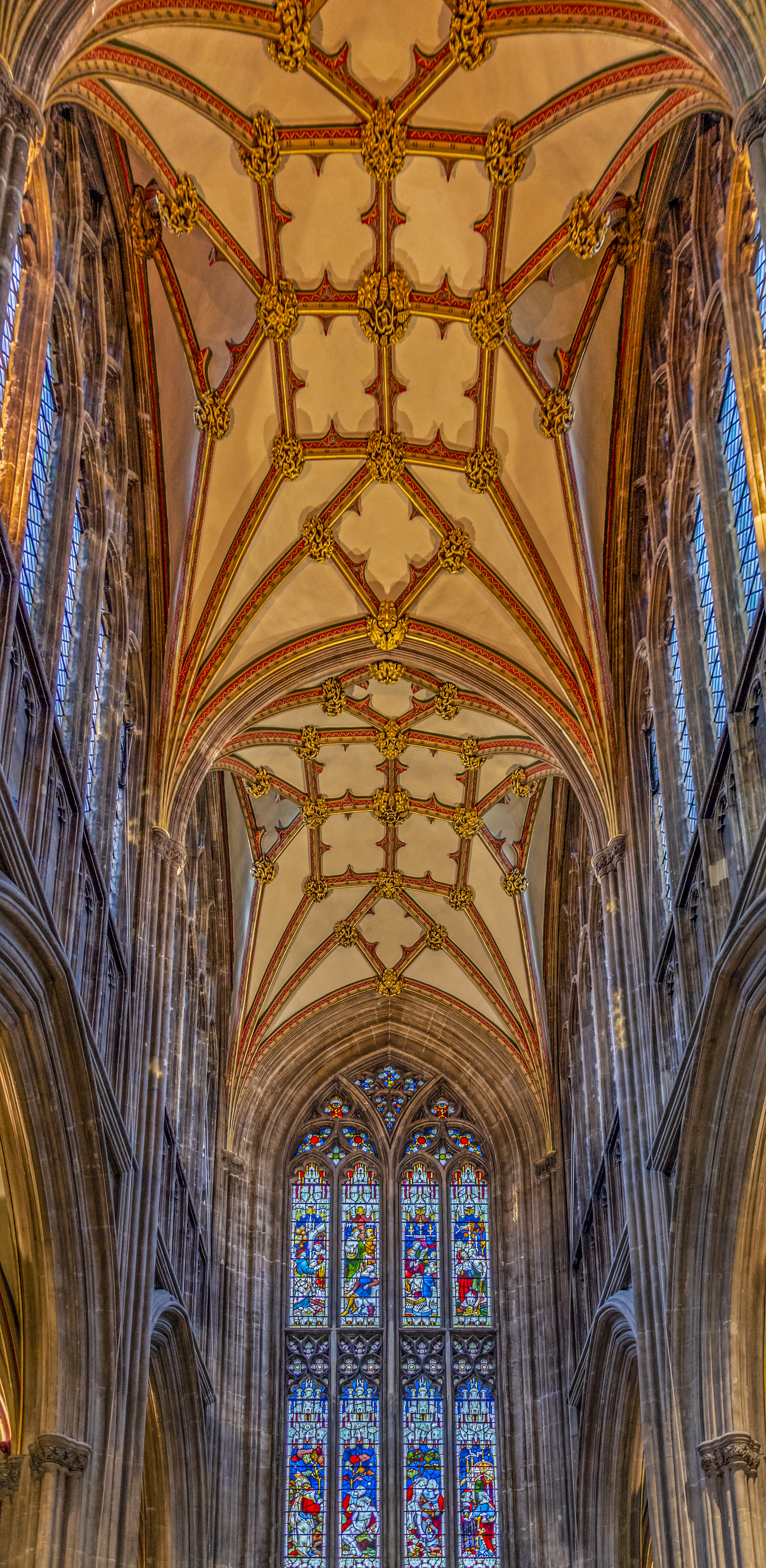
North transept and vault

==== Stained glass ====
The church lost the majority of its medieval stained glass during the damage done by Parliamentary forces in the 17th century, with fragments confined to the north transept, St John's chapel and lower tower windows. In 1842, the committee responsible for the restoration of the church were mostly concerned with the condition of the stonework which was estimated to cost some £40,000 to repair, but were determined to have the large east window, which at the time was bricked up, filled with glass. In 1847, the committee awarded the contract for its design and implementation to William Wailes of Newcastle-upon-Tyne, one of the most prolific stained glass designers of the 19th century, who estimated the cost at £330. This window was replaced in 1904 by a design by Clayton & Bell; Wailes' window being destroyed. Clayton and Bell provided much of the stained glass for the church following the 1842 decision to restore it, along with works by Ninian Comper and Joseph Bell of Bristol.

A notable medieval window to survive is in the lowest stage of the tower, featuring eight large figures, including depictions of Archbishop Thomas Becket and the saints Lawrence, Michael, Matthias, John the Baptist and Elizabeth. This window was reset and restored by Joseph Bell in the restoration. In the Second World War, incendiary bombs irrevocably damaged the windows of the Lady Chapel, which were replaced by five vivid figurative windows on the theme of the Life of the Virgin. They were designed and manufactured by Harry Stammers and installed between 1960 and 1966. In 2020, following the toppling of the statue of Edward Colston, the church took the decision to remove the lower four panels in the main window of the north transept which paid tribute to him, temporarily replacing them with clear glass. A competition to design new panels to replace these removed windows was launched in May 2022. The winner was announced in September 2022 as being Ealish Swift, a junior doctor in one of the city's hospitals, who designed panels depicting the Middle Passage, Bristol bus boycott, and Refugee Crisis.

As of 2023, the church has a mixture of stained glass and clear glass, with mostly Victorian work in the east end, and clear glass in the clerestory windows of the nave.

Great East Window, Clayton & Bell

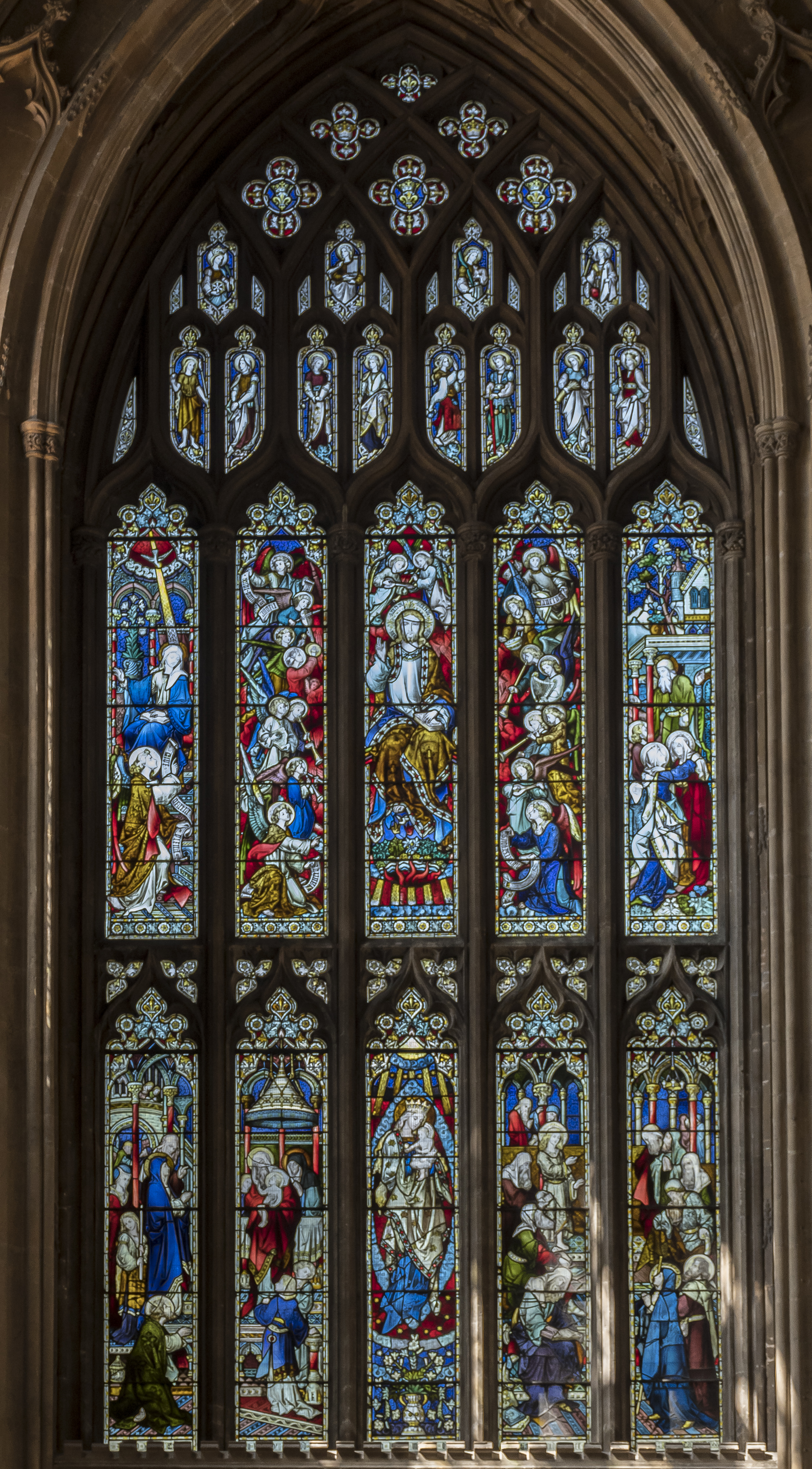
Great West Window, Hardman (1868)

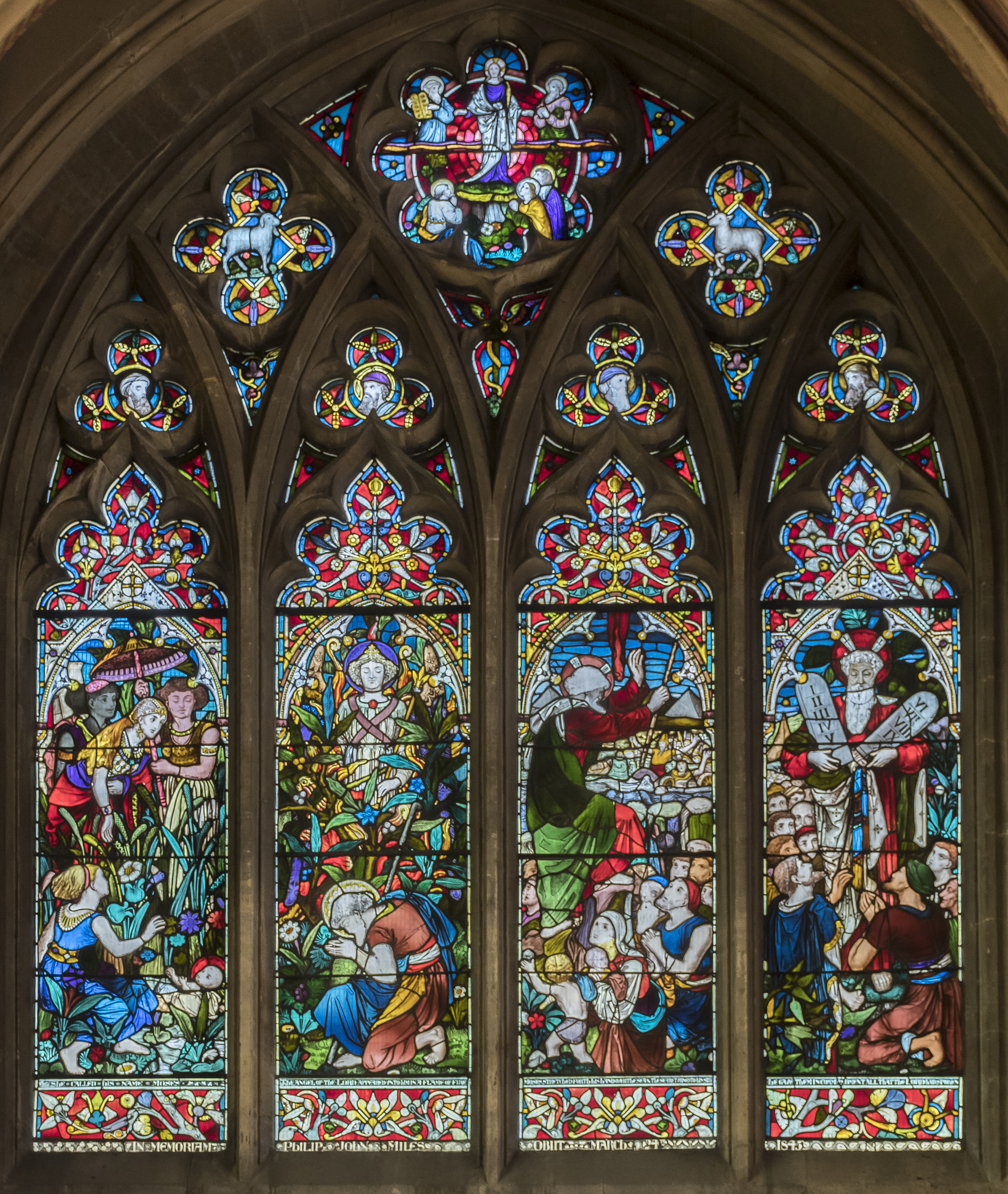
Moses window, Butler & Bayne (1897)

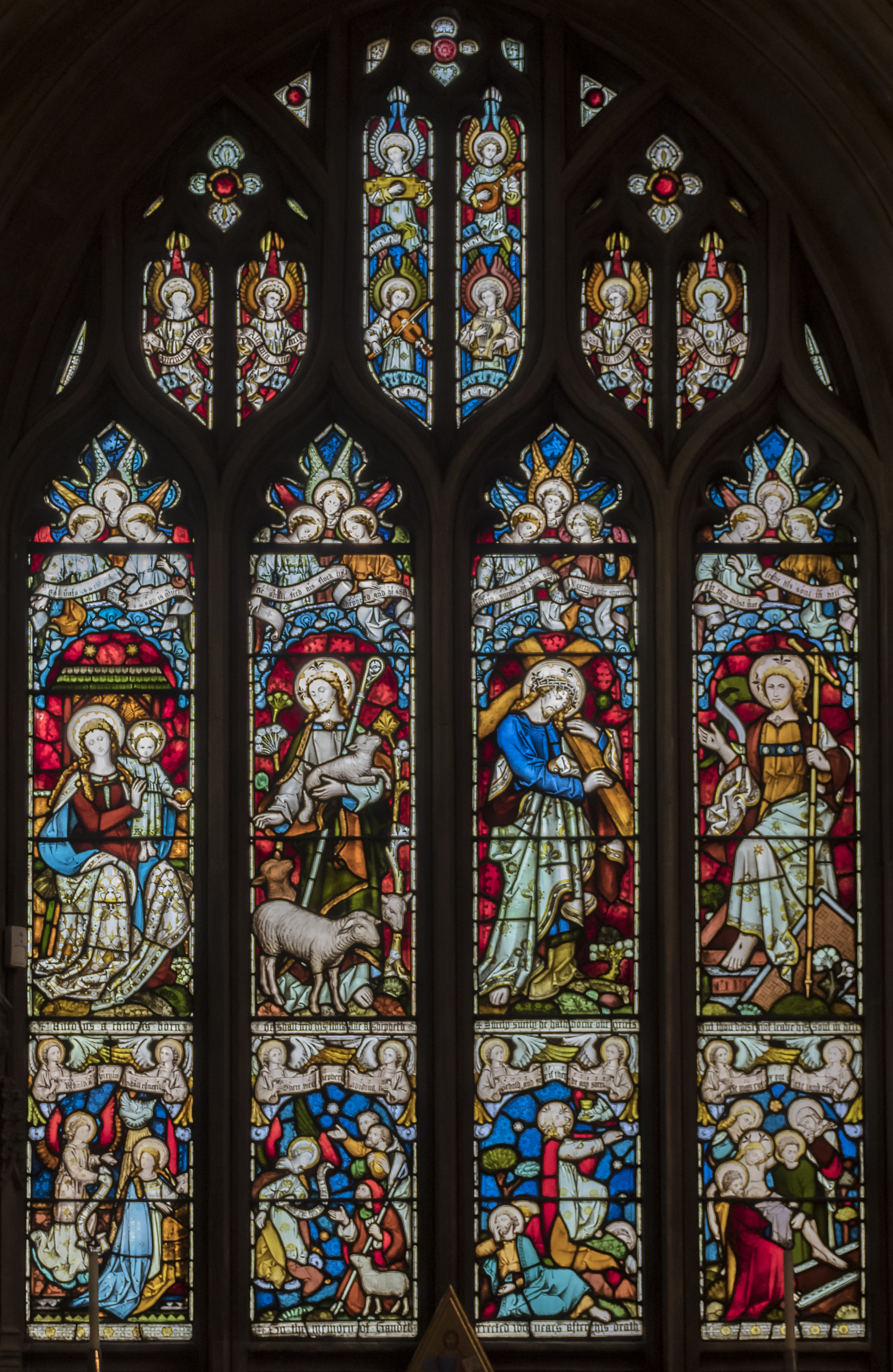
Window marking 100th anniversary of the death of George Frederick Handel

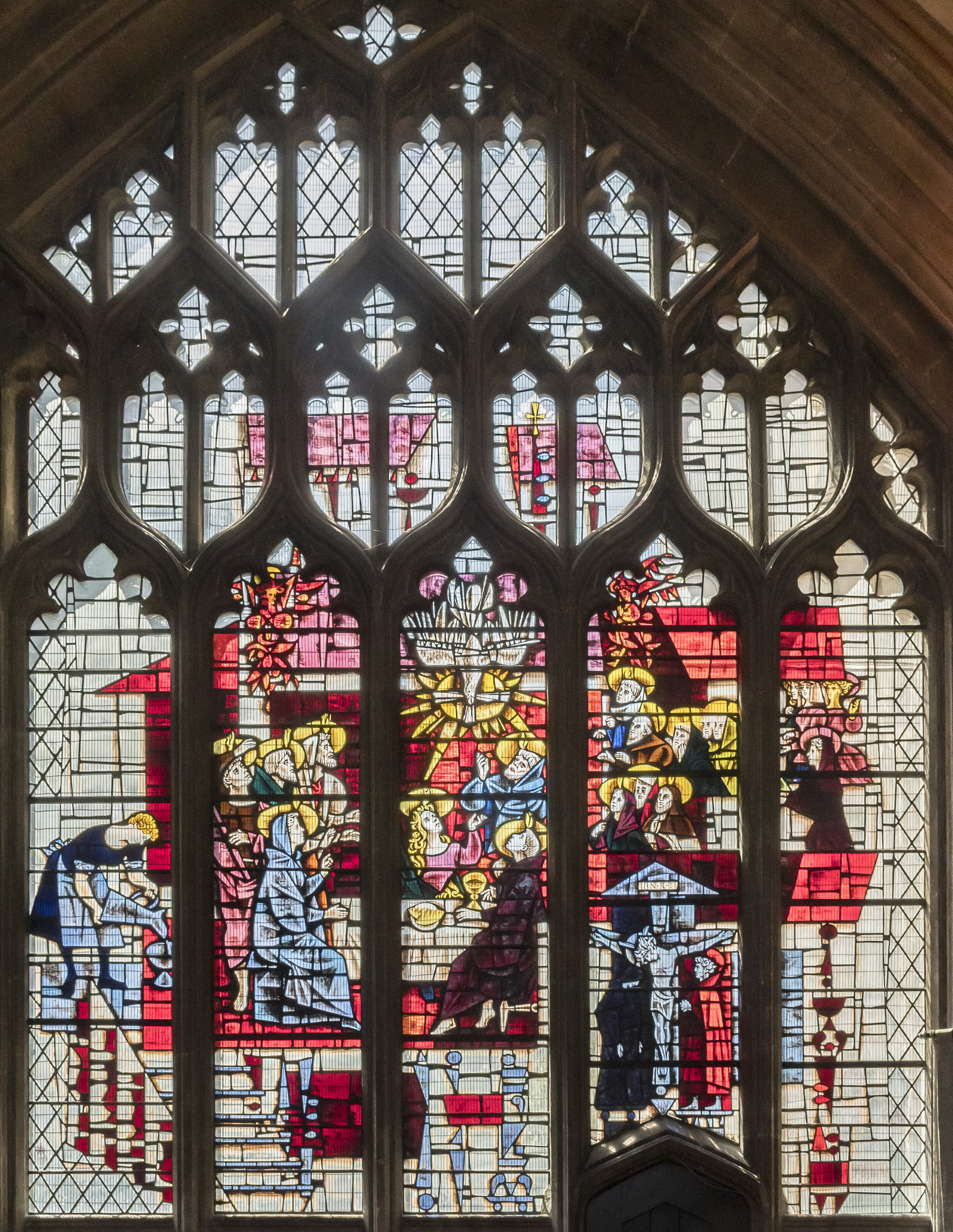
Lady Chapel - south window, Pentecost, Harry Stammers (1960)

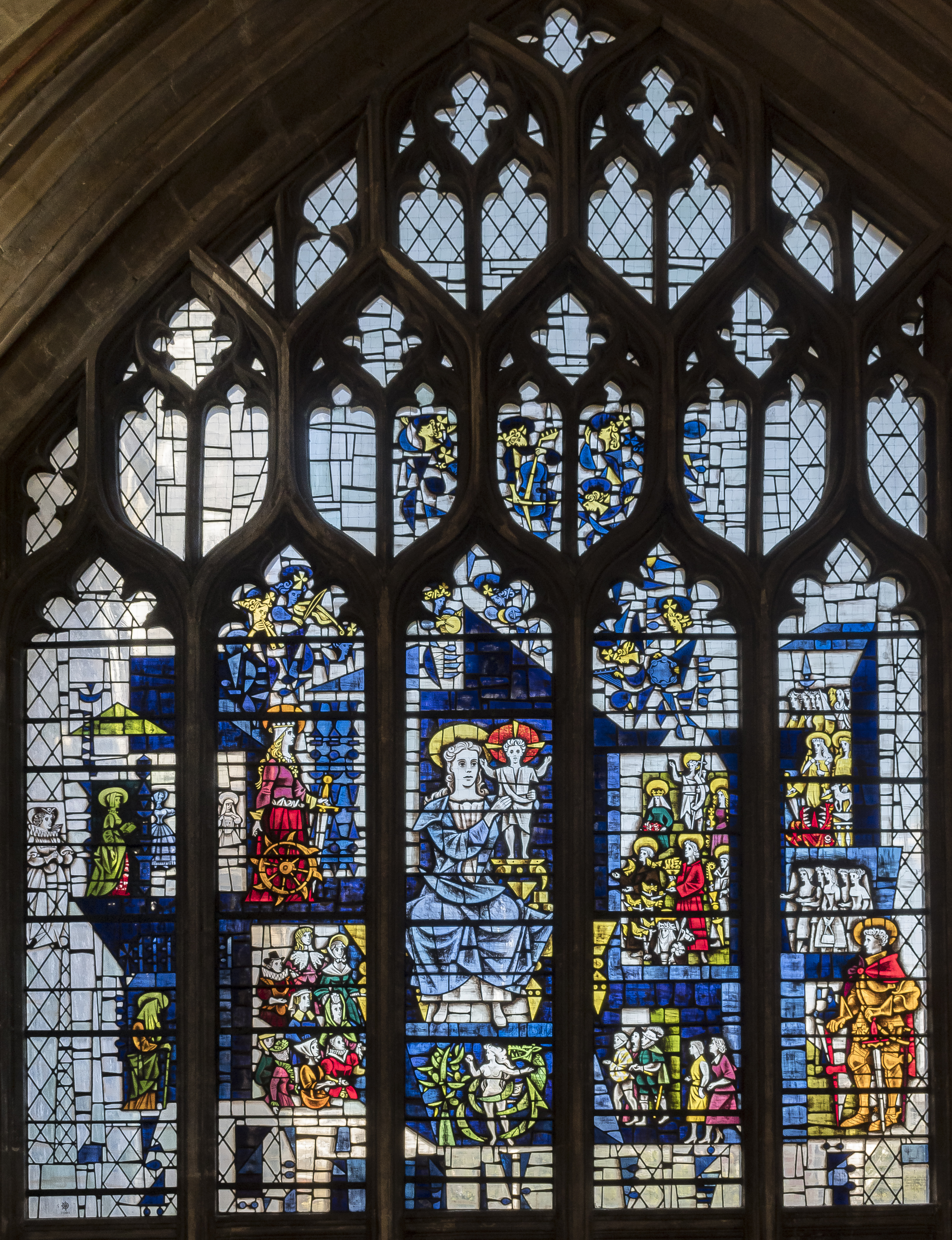
Lady Chapel - north window, Jesus presented as Saviour of the World, Harry Stammers (1961)

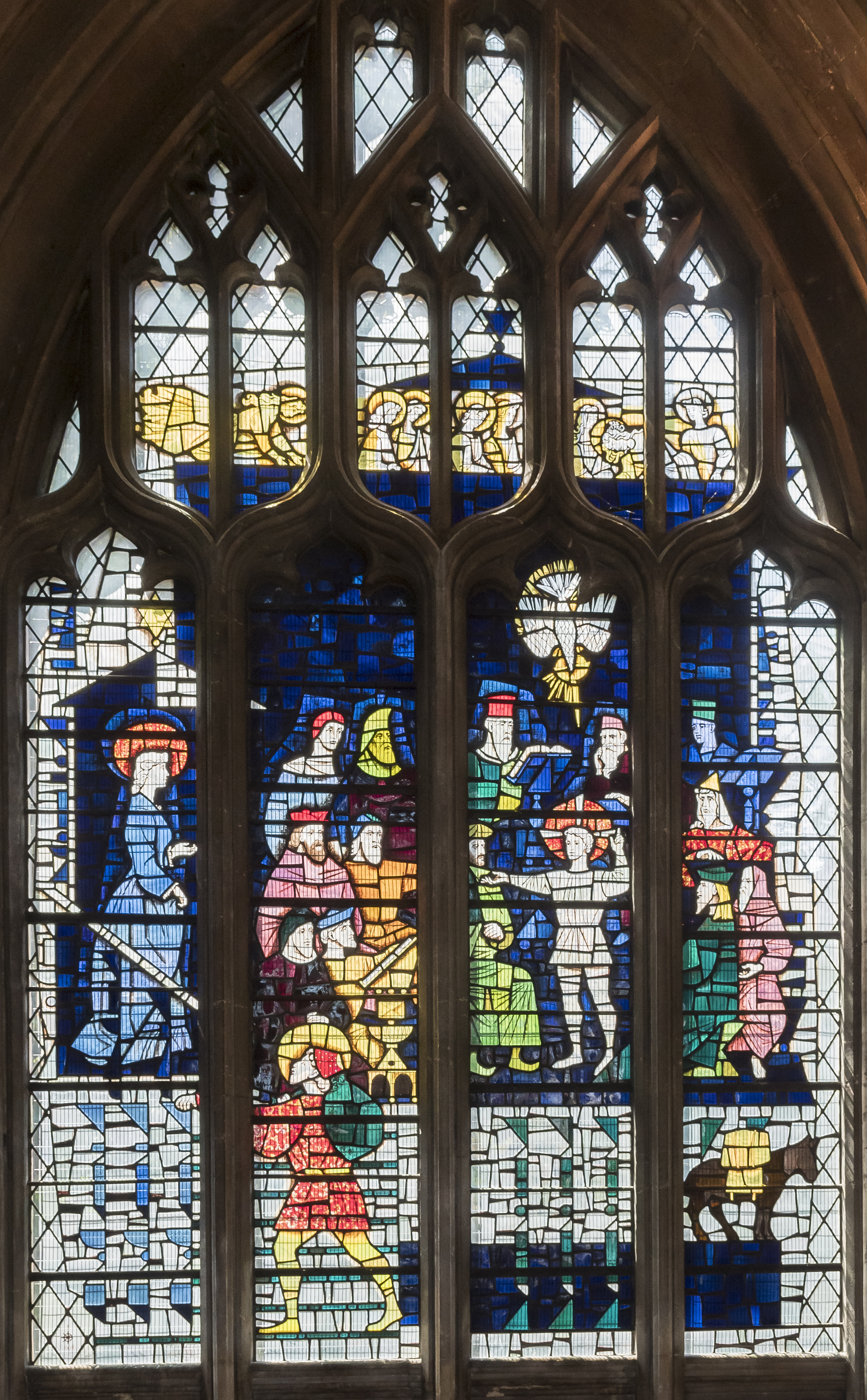
Lady Chapel - south window, Jesus in the Temple with the Elders, Harry Stammers (1964)

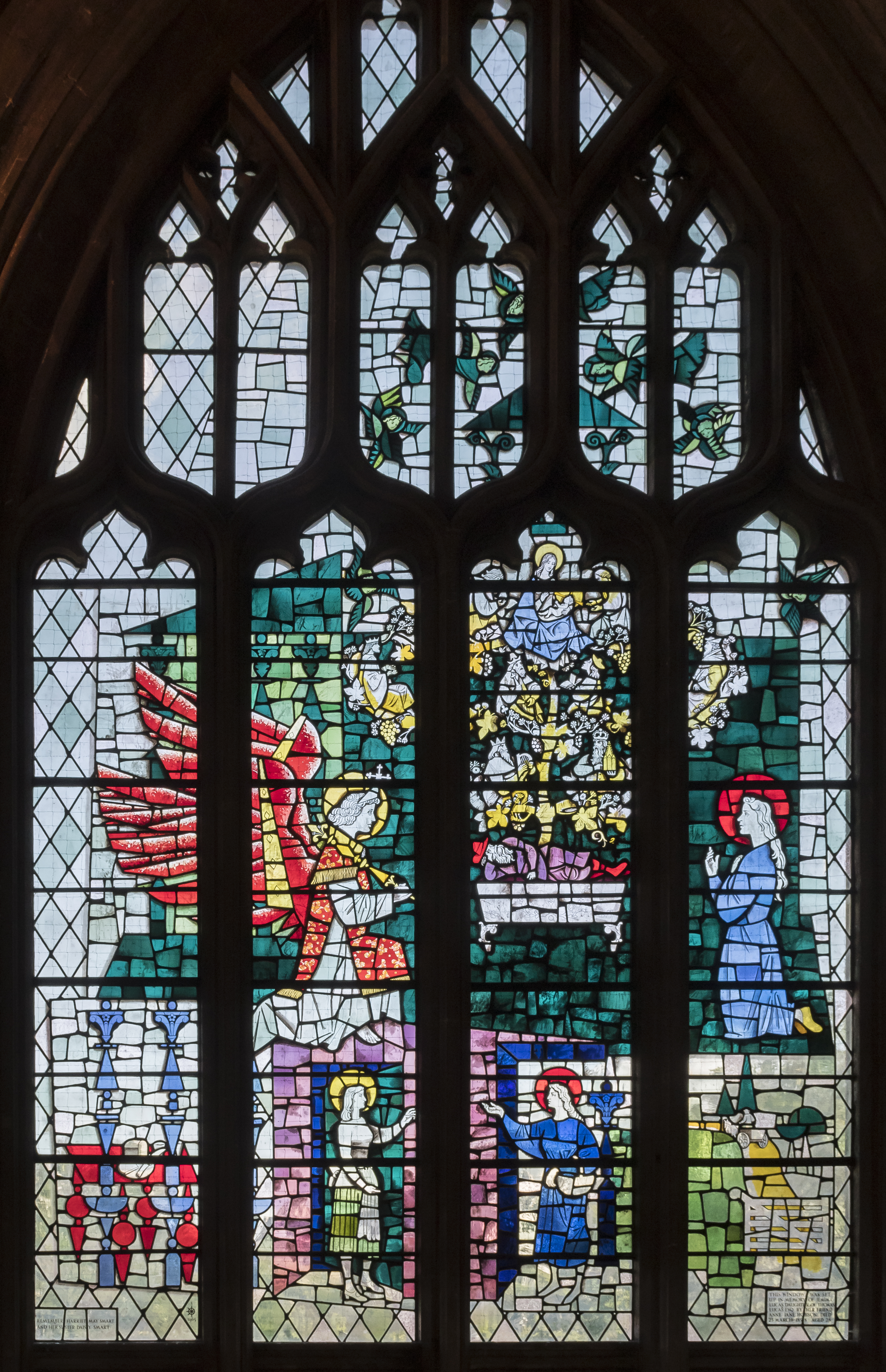
Lady Chapel - north window, Annunciation, Harry Stammers (1965)

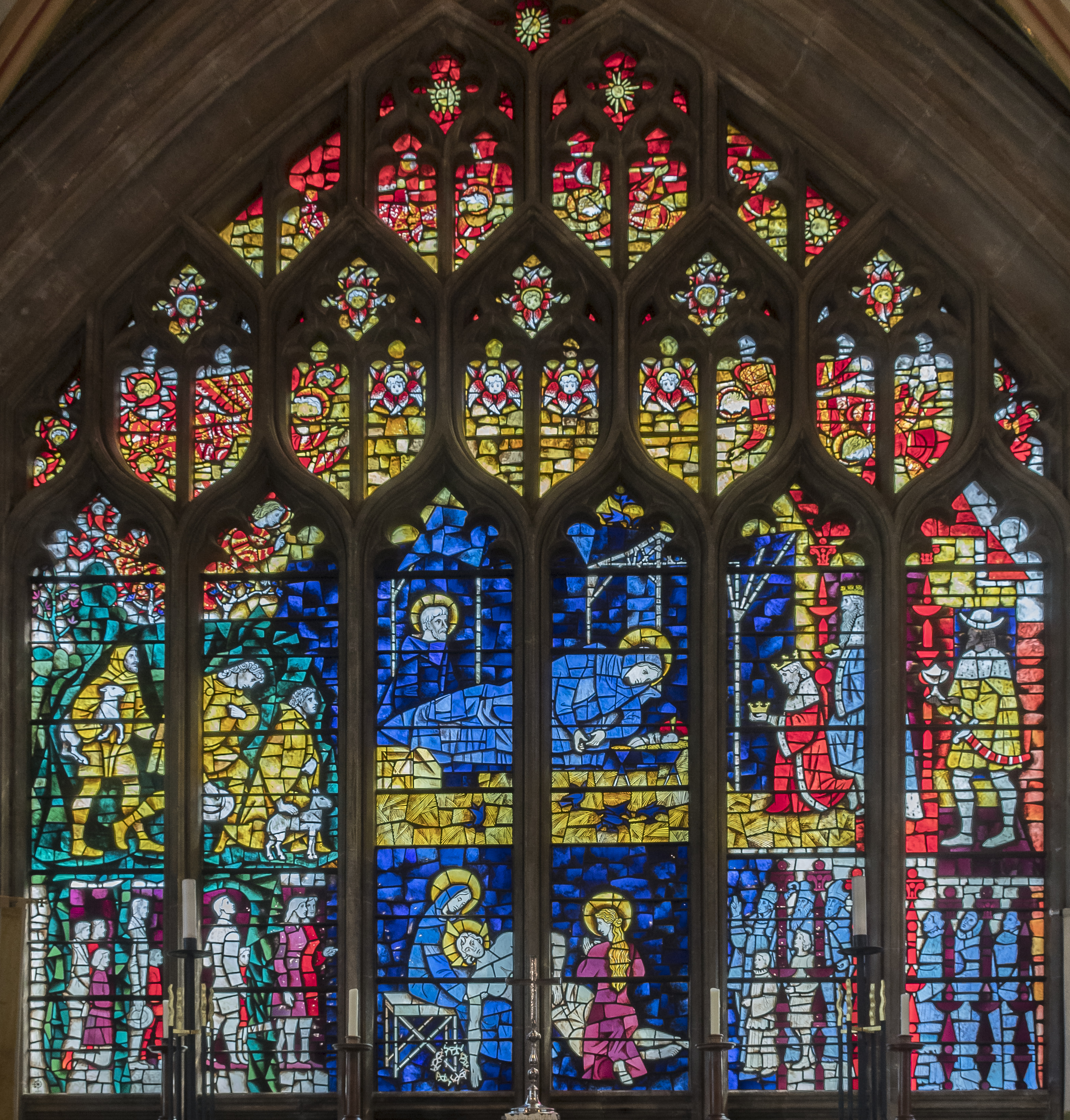
Lady Chapel - East window, Nativity and Pieta, Harry Stammers (1966)

==== Fittings, memorials and monuments ====
The church building has numerous monuments and memorials due to its long association with the city of Bristol, its port and Queen Elizabeth I. Notable fittings include the fine ironwork screen designed by William Edney in 1710 intended to divide the chancel and nave, but moved in the restoration to sit under the tower; and the Victorian reredos below the east window. Other fittings of note include the 19th century pews; the 15th century St John's font, the only relic of St John's Church in Bedminster to survive the Blitz, and the 15th century choir stalls.

The church also has many memorials, most notably to William Canynges who is buried in a brightly coloured tomb in the south transept, but also to Queen Elizabeth I. Monuments include a model of one of the ships that would sail from the Port of Bristol, and a wall memorial in the memory of the father of William Penn, the founder of Pennsylvania, Admiral Sir William Penn. His helm and half-armour are hung on the wall, together with the tattered banners of the Dutch ships that he captured in battle. The church also displays a rib of a whale brought back from one of his voyages by John Cabot. There is also a carved medieval cope chest, a wineglass-shaped pulpit and multiple misericords.

Tomb of William II Canynges and Joan Burton

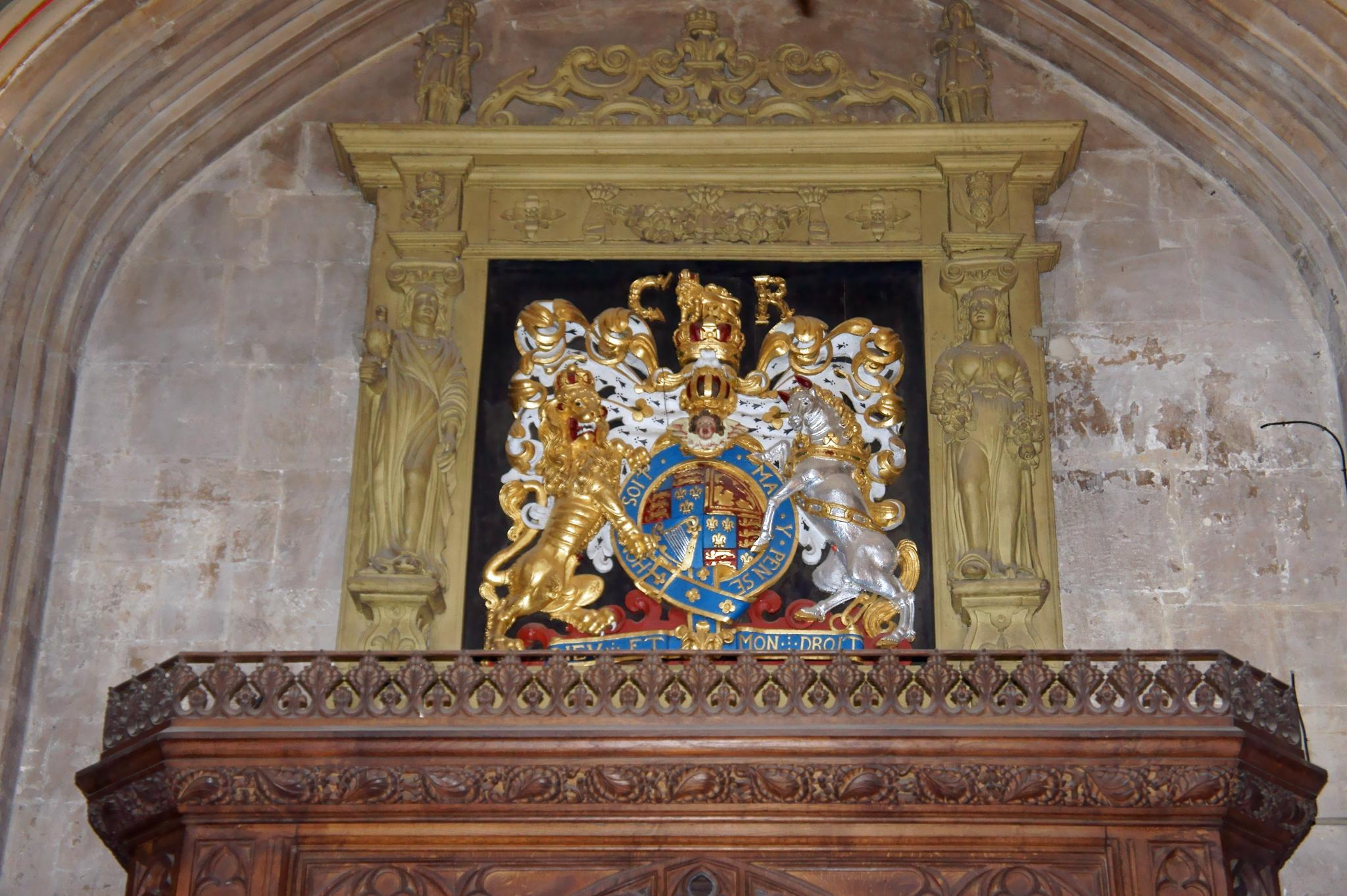
Coat of arms for King Charles I, located above the porch

William Penn memorial

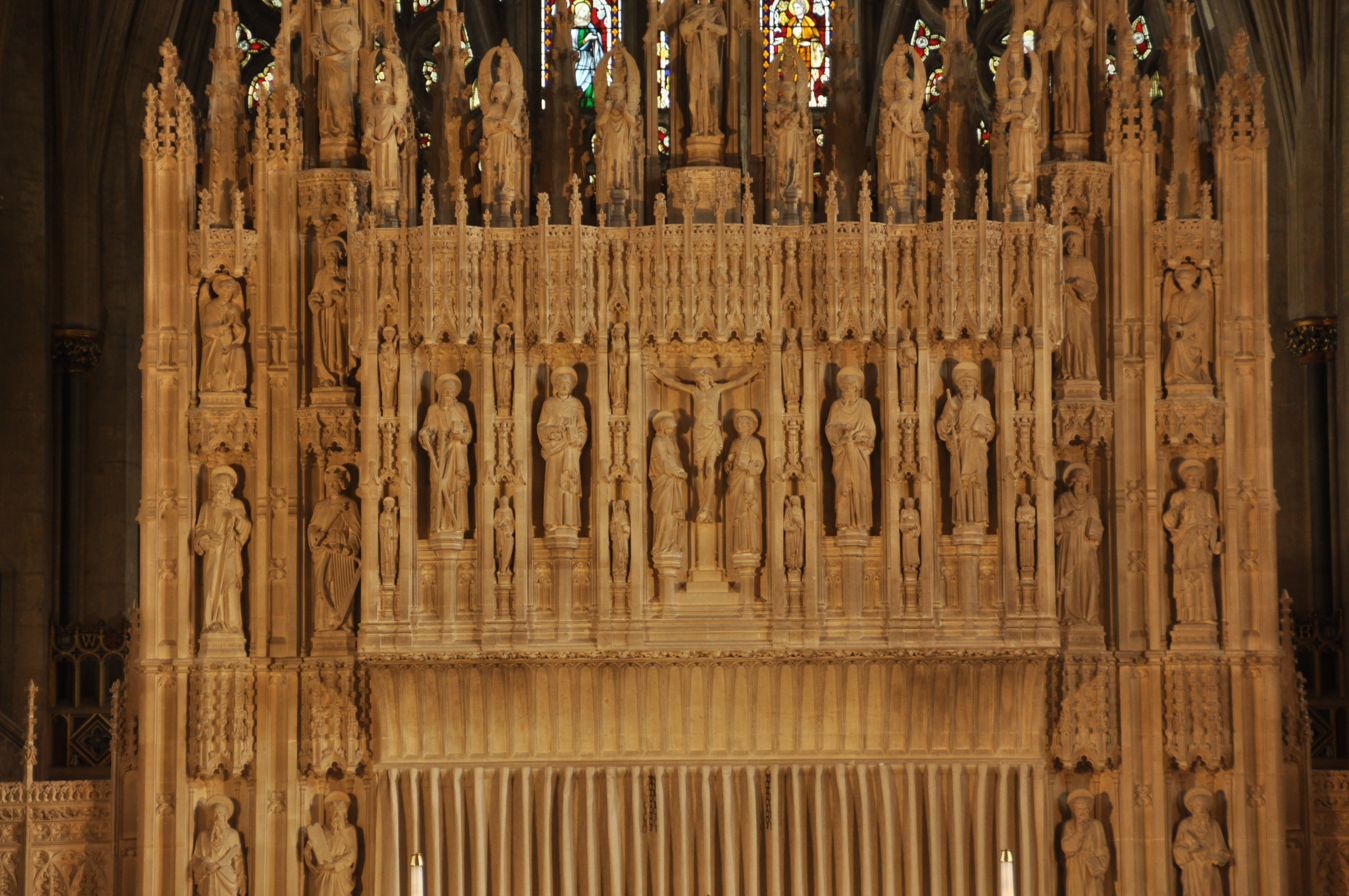
Reredos

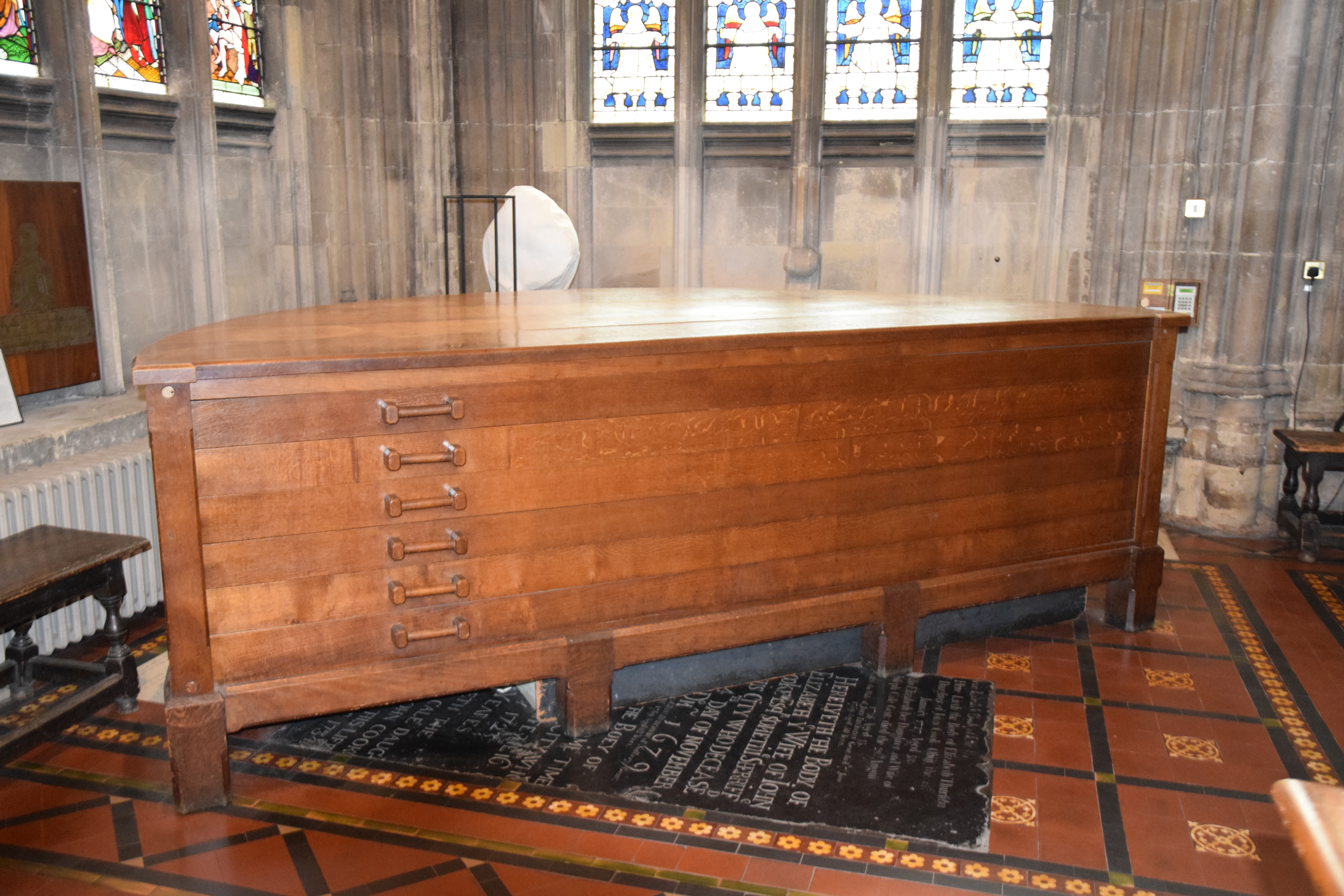
Cope chest

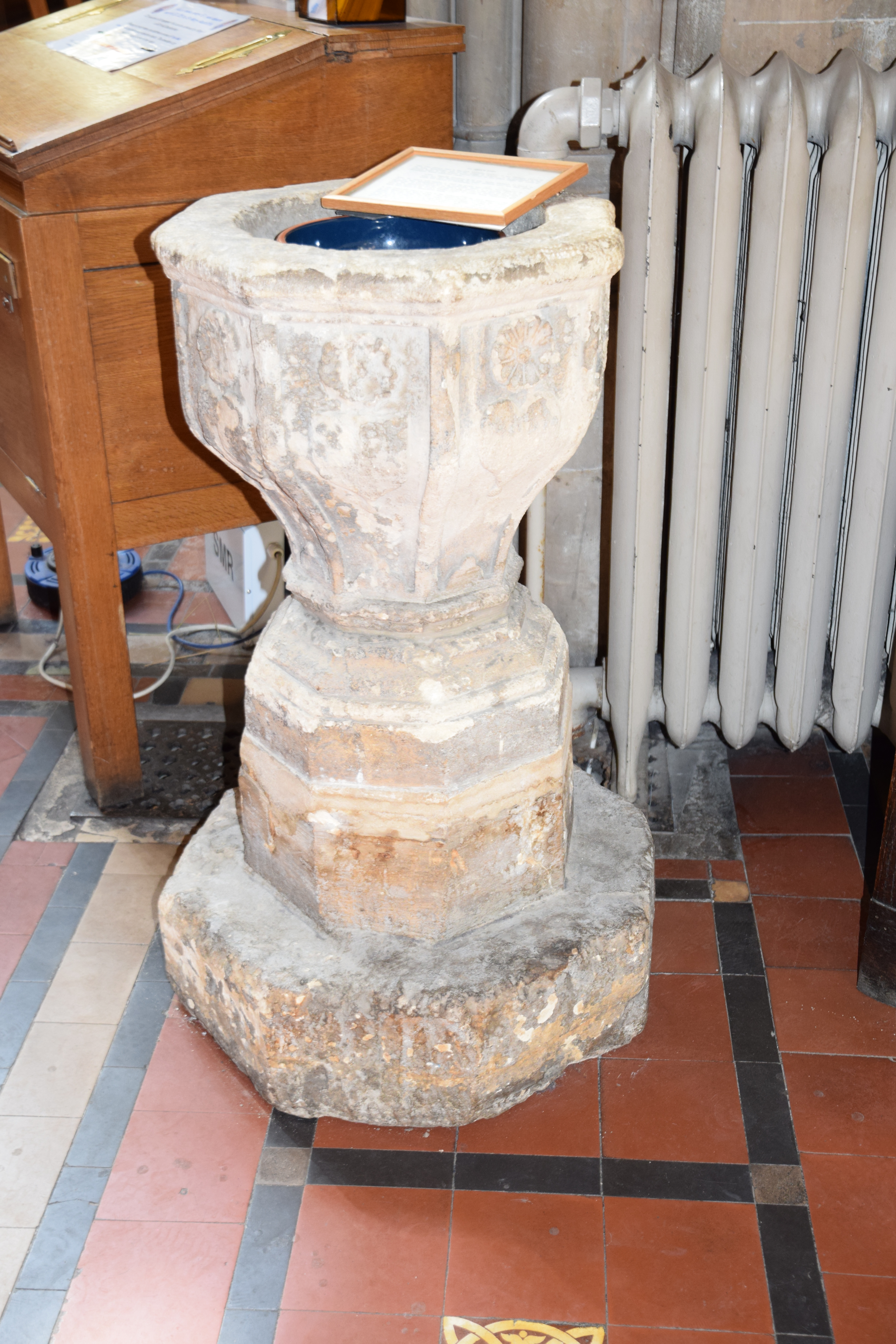
Bedminster font

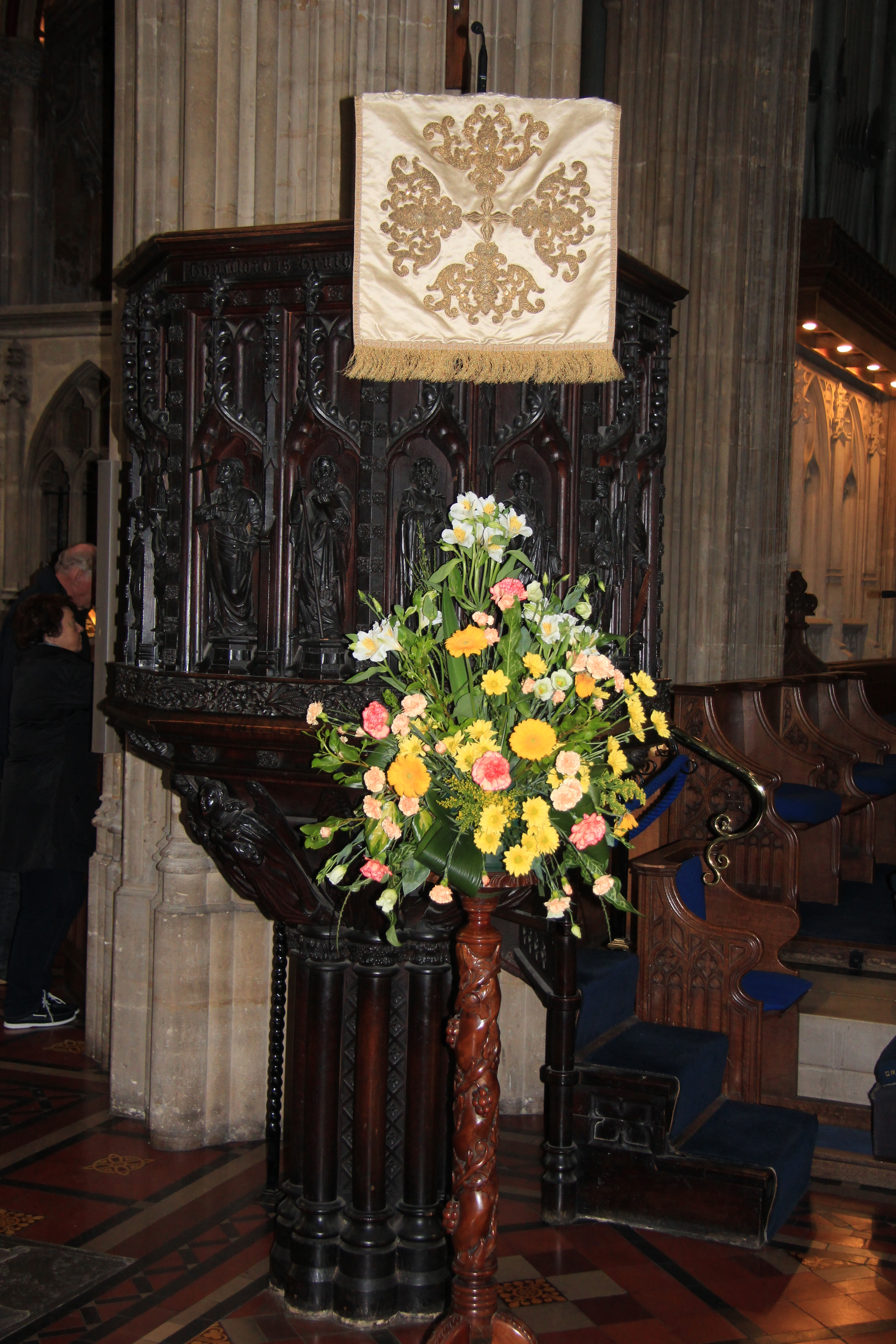
Pulpit

== Music ==
=== Organ ===
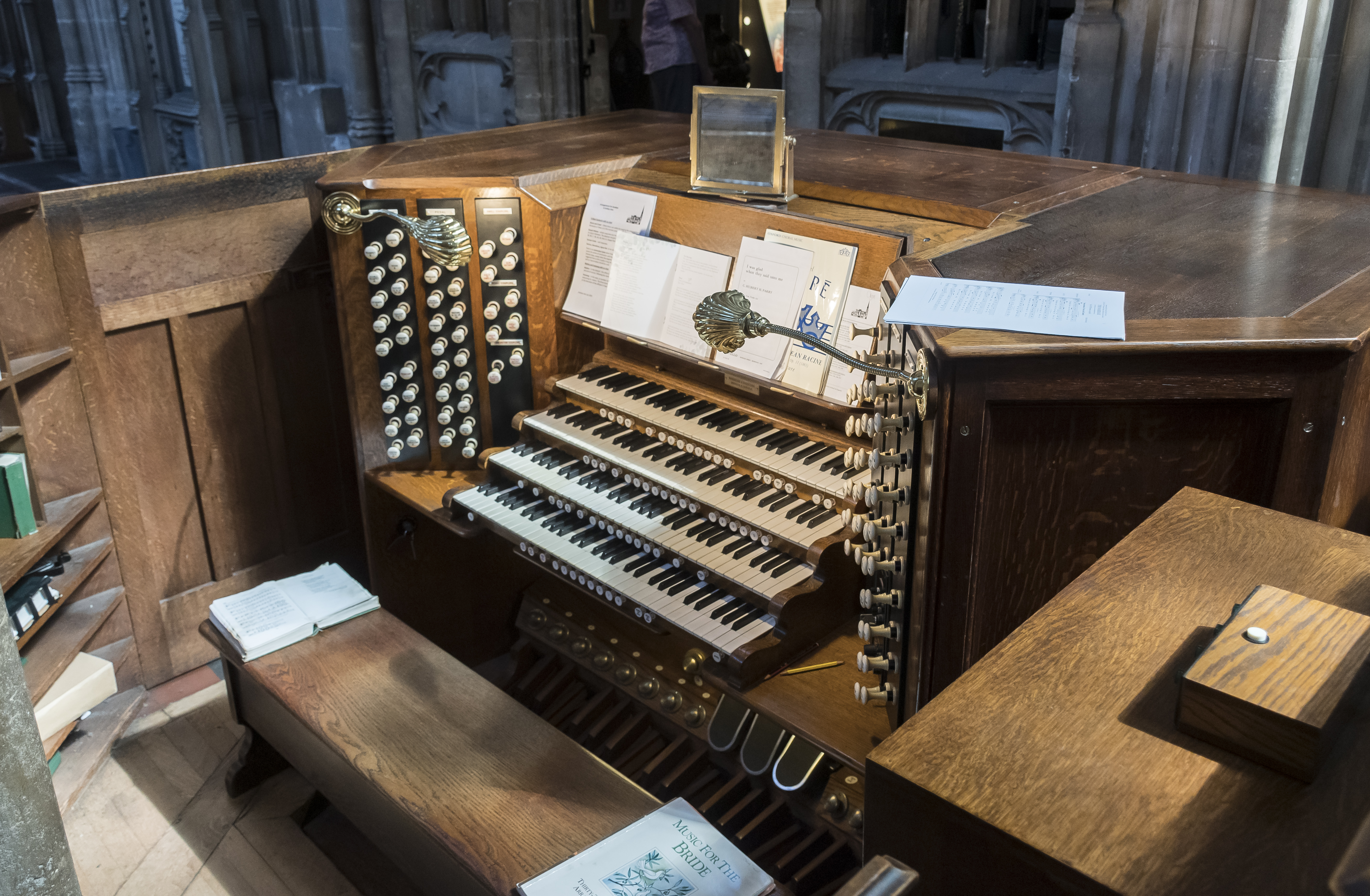
Organ console

The earliest record of an organ at St Mary Redcliffe is when a new instrument by John Harris and John Byfield was installed in the church in 1726. This organ was one of the largest of its time, featuring three manuals and 26 stops, located on a new western gallery in the nave. This organ was rebuilt by John Smith of Bristol in 1829 and then completely altered by W. G. Vowles, also of Bristol, in 1867, when it was enlarged, rebuilt and reinstalled in the chancel. The 1867 organ kept the three manuals, but had an increased number of stops, 33 in number.

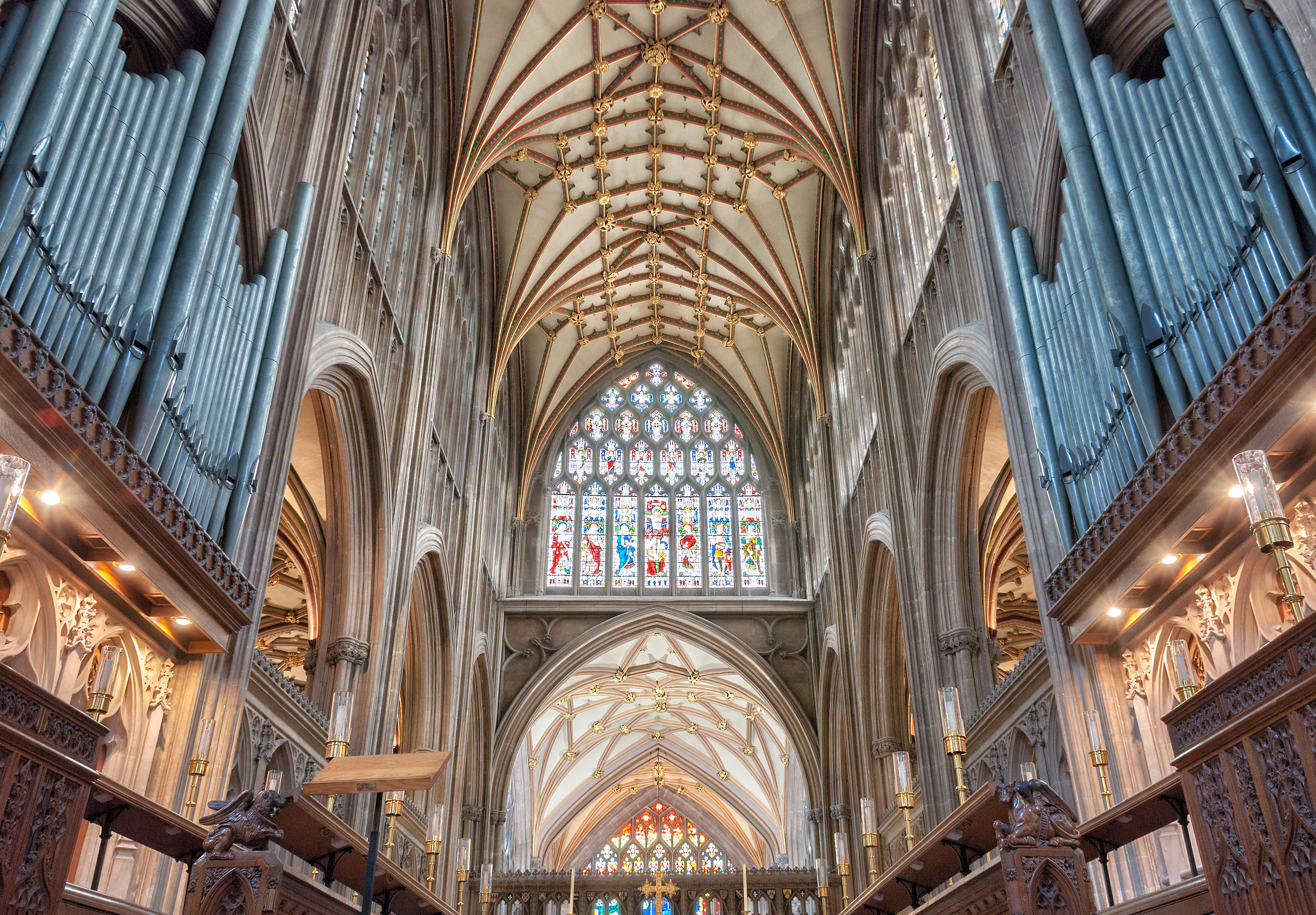
Quire and organ

From 1910 to 1912, organ builders Harrison & Harrison of Durham built and installed a brand new organ for the church, incorporating a small amount of the old pipework. The new organ was much larger, and due to space constraints had to be split between the north and south walls of the chancel. A new stone chamber for the Swell Organ was built in the angle between the north transept and north chancel aisle. The Great Organ was placed on the north side of the chancel with the remaining parts on the south; the console being placed to the west, near the north transept. This organ had more than twice as many stops as the previous organs, a total of 68 as installed.

In 1941, the Swell Organ was affected by fire and bomb damage and had to be rebuilt in 1947 by Harrison & Harrison with additional pipes. The organ was cleaned and overhauled in 1974 and 1990 with tonal alterations, new equipment and additional stops; two stops were also removed. The 1990 work was never completely satisfactory, and so when the organ approached its next restoration in the early 2000s, a part of the project involved correcting errors from the 1990 overhaul.

The project to restore the organ in time for its 100th birthday was launched in 2007, with a fundraising goal of some £800,000. Half of the money was donated by the Canynges Society and the remaining half raised by the congregation, incorporating an anonymous £100,000 cheque left in the church for the restoration of the organ. The organ was dismantled in 2009 and returned in 2010, with four new blowers and new layout for the swell, new actions for the various keyboards, and cleaned and tuned. The organ as it stands today has 71 stops and 4,327 pipes, making it amongst the largest organs in Southern England. The organ is very well thought of for the quality of its tone, ranking amongst the finest organs in the country.

In 2024 there were plans for churches in Britain, including St Mary Redcliffe, to hold concerts with doom metal bands and organ, a genre dubbed "organic metal", following a successful event. The St Mary Redcliffe director of music said "Our organ is world-famous – Handel played it. ... There's a lot of history, so by doing something like a rock concert with an organ follows on in that kind of tradition."

=== Bells ===
==== Early bells ====
The earliest record of bells at Redcliffe is in 1480, where a very large peal of six are recorded. The founders were not known, as only the number of bells was recorded by William Worcestre. It is known from the churchwarden's accounts, that the 4th bell was recast by William Jeffers in 1572, and the 5th and 6th by Roger Purdue in 1622. The Purdue family were one of the most prolific medieval bellfounders in England and were based in Somerset and Bristol; 531 of their bells still survive today. Purdue's tenor was recorded as weighing 42 long hundredweight (cwt) 0 qrs 27 lbs (2,150 kg or 4,731 lb). In 1626, the bells were rehung in a massive oak frame which was inscribed with "T. Roome, Anno Domini 1626", who was presumably the frame's maker.

In 1698, Abel Rudhall of Gloucester augmented the ring of six to eight with two new treble bells. No further work is recorded until 1763, when Thomas Bilbie recast the 3rd, 4th, 5th and 6th of the eight. The Bilbie family, like the Purdue family, were a prolific West Country foundry; 734 of their bells survive today. Curiously, Bilbie had to guarantee the recast bells were at least as heavy as the bells they replaced; if they were not, he had to pay 1 shilling per pound of reduced metal. The first peal in the tower was a few years later, being 5,040 changes of Grandsire Triples on 29 May 1768.

==== 19th century augmentation ====
In 1823, the bells were augmented to ten with two trebles cast by Thomas Mears II of Whitechapel, though the first peal on the ten would not follow until 1835. The bells were augmented to twelve in 1872 by Mears' successors, Mears & Stainbank. The augmented bells were the third ring of twelve in the West Country, following Cirencester in 1722 and Painswick in 1821, and the 25th ring of twelve in the country. By the late 1880s, the ease at which the bells could be rung was deteriorating, and so John Taylor & Co of Loughborough were asked to inspect the bells. They reported that the fittings of the 10th and tenor bells were in a bad state, and should be renewed or replaced. They also reported that these 2 bells should be turned so that the clappers would not strike the same point of the bell, to avoid the risk of cracking. They inspected the frame, reporting that the frame timbers were sound, but not massive enough to support such a heavy ring of bells, and thus recommended bolting some cast iron brackets to the corners to make it more rigid. The frame housing the three smallest bells they described as badly designed and too weak; these bells were hung above the other nine. They also recommended the fitting of iron girders across the tower walls from east to west. The cost of all this work was £149, though the fitting of the iron girders is not recorded.

The first peal on the ring twelve was on New Year's Eve 1899, being 5,007 changes of Stedman Cinques in rung 3h 28m, with two men on the tenor. There was a fierce debate in the Bell News magazine for several months afterwards, with some claiming the peal cannot have been rung successfully because the speed of the peal was "impossibly fast" given the weight of the tenor, which was often recorded at anywhere between 48 and 52 long cwt (5,376 kg – 5,824 kg) in ringing magazines.

==== 20th century restoration ====
In 1902, Taylor's were asked to come again, and this time they found things considerably worse than on their previous visit fourteen years earlier. Some of the frame was no longer sound, with rotten or decaying timbers, and various wedges had been installed in the frame corners to try and give it rigidity. These wedges transferred the forces into the walls of the tower, and whilst it was not currently damaging it, it had the potential to do so. Taylor's advised that the bells should be rehung in a new metal frame, with all twelve bells on one level (unlike the existing frame), and the clock weights being reorganised to pass through one corner of the bell chamber instead of being suspended from the centre of the ringing chamber. They also recommended new fittings throughout. The estimate that the church received from Taylor's for new fittings and a new frame would cost £709. The architect was consulted and following talks with Taylor's, it was agreed to recast the lightest seven bells and the tenor, retuning the other four.

The bells, the frame and the fittings left Bristol for Loughborough in the early months of 1903. The bells were all weighed upon their arrival, where the tenor was found to be only 39 long cwt (4,368 kg), over half a tonne lighter than reputed, which then explained how the peal in 1899 was faster than many thought possible. The lightest seven and the tenor bell were broken up and recast with additional metal, and the 8th, 9th, 10th and 11th bells had their canons (ornamental loops of bell metal previously used for attaching bells to their headstocks) removed. The bells were also retuned, the combined action of both removing the canons and retuning reducing the weight of each of these four bells by approximately 2 long cwt (225 kg).

The 9th bell, however, for a reason that is unknown was recast later in the same year; according to legend this is because the railway company dropped the 9th on the return to Bristol, and it had to be recast. The logbook housed in the archives at John Taylor & Co's Loughborough foundry shows the arrival weight and post-tuning weights of the former 9th crossed through and a new, heavier weight recorded underneath. The bells were provided with all new fittings throughout, including Taylor's standard cast iron headstocks, Hasting stays, timber wheels, wrought iron clappers and plain bearings. They were hung in a massive new cast iron frame for 12 bells which had been installed in the closing months of 1903, with room left for an additional 13th bell later if required.

When the bells were installed, the new heavier tenor, which weighed 50 long cwt 2 qrs 21 lbs (5,677 lb or 2,575 kg), made the bells the fourth heaviest in the world hung for change ringing, after Exeter Cathedral, St Paul's Cathedral and Wells Cathedral; but the second heaviest ring of twelve, as Exeter and Wells were both rings of ten. Exeter would later be augmented to 12 in 1922, also by Taylor's. The first peal on the new bells was on New Year's Day in 1904, being 5,085 changes of Stedman Cinques in 4 hours exactly. The bells would later be relegated to the 5th heaviest ring of bells and the 4th heaviest twelve by the casting of the bells of York Minster in 1925, also by Taylor's, and then relegated again by the ring of twelve at Liverpool Anglican Cathedral, cast by Mears & Stainbank in 1939; they have remained the sixth heaviest ring of bells in the world since.

With the introduction of ball bearings to church bells in 1920, Taylor's rehung the bells on ball bearings in 1933. These new ball bearings no longer required regular greasing, unlike the old plain type of bearings and were also self-aligning.

==== Since World War II ====
In the spring of 1941, following damage by Second World War bombing to many towers in London, including the destruction of the ring of twelve at St Mary-le-Bow, the church removed the bells from the tower and kept them in the undercroft underneath sandbags. The bells were returned to the tower and rehung in November 1944, also by Taylor's.

In 1951, the 13th bell that Taylor's had left the space for in 1903 was ordered, being cast at Loughborough as with the other bells. This bell, called a flat sixth, occupied the position in the frame between the sixth and seventh bells and was used to provide a lighter ring of eight, when bells two to nine are rung with the flat sixth replacing the normal sixth. The ninth weighs 19 long cwt 3 qrs 1 lb (2,213 lb or 1,004 kg), less than half that of the tenor bell, which makes teaching new ringers easier. To fit this extra bell in, Taylor's provided an additional section of frame. The new bell was provided with all new fittings, identical to those of the other bells.

In 1967, St John's Church in Bedminster, which had been in ruins since sustaining heavy damage in the Bristol Blitz, was demolished. The font was brought to Redcliffe (see fittings, above), and the only surviving bell was donated to Redcliffe to increase its number of bells to fourteen. This bell, which weighed 8 and a half long cwt (950 lb or 430 kg) was cast by Bristol founder Llewellins and James in 1907. The bell was recast in 1969 by Taylor's to make it better suit the bells at Redcliffe. This fourteenth bell, called an 'extra treble' was provided with fittings to complement the Redcliffe bells and was hung in a new cast iron frame above the existing thirteen bells; its purpose was to augment the light eight to a light ring of ten, utilising the extra treble, the treble bell and bells two to nine with the flat sixth.

Following the bells hundredth birthday in 2003, the bells have received attention several times on both a minor and major basis. In 2009, the 9th bell was rehung on a new and larger wheel to make it easier to ring; the wheel it had been provided with in 1903 appeared to suit better the weight of the old ninth rather than the one that was recast. The frame containing the extra treble was moved slightly to improve the place the rope falls in the circle, and it too was given a new wheel. In 2012, the 8th bell, which had been cast in 1763 by Thomas Bilbie, was retired, being both underweight and poor in tone to the more modern Taylor bells around it. John Taylor & Co were selected to cast a new bell to replace it, and had to scan the surrounding bells with a laser to get an accurate shape, as the 1903 shape Taylor's had used at the time of their recasting was no longer in use.

The new bell was cast to celebrate the Diamond Jubilee of Queen Elizabeth II and following its tuning, it weighed some 15 and a half cwt (790 kg), over 250 kg heavier than its predecessor, and was hung in the spring of 2013. At the same time, the wheels of the sixth, seventh and eighth were rejigged: the sixth received the wheel that had been on the seventh, the seventh received that of the old eighth and the new eighth received the wheel on the ninth until 2009. The old eighth bell was hung on steel girders above the ringing peal, for chiming. The last major piece of work to the bells in recent times was in 2017, when the fittings were dismantled and, together with the frame, were repainted in Taylor's standard red livery. The bells remain the sixth heaviest ring of bells (but fifth heaviest ring of twelve) in the world. They are also the heaviest ring of bells in a parish church.

The bells are considered one of the finest rings of bells in existence, with visiting bands of ringers coming from across the British Isles and beyond to ring them. There have been more than 300 full peals rung on the bells since the first in 1768; the St Mary Redcliffe Guild of Ringers attempts several full peals on the bells a year, normally to mark national events, most recently, the State Funeral of Queen Elizabeth II in September 2022.

== Location and precincts ==
Since the construction of Redcliffe Way in the 1960s, the church has sat next to a busy dual carriageway on its north side, whose construction resulted in the demolition of many of the historic buildings that originally faced the church, as well as a gradual blackening of the stone from pollution. The church has, however, kept its historic south churchyard, which has been described as a "cathedral close in miniature", with a small group of listed buildings sat around a south-facing lawn. These buildings are a row of terraced houses on Colston Parade, approximately half of those built in the Stucco style from 1760 to 1762, augmented with four Victorian terraces; all are Grade II listed.

The south churchyard contains the Redcliffe War Memorial, formed of a large, tapering stone shaft surmounted by a cross, designed by George Oatley in 1921. The memorial was originally designed and constructed to commemorate the fallen of Redcliffe in the First World War, but it was altered following further loss of life in the Second World War. The memorial is Grade II listed. There are two other parts of the churchyard to achieve listed status, these are the walls on Colston Parade which date to the 18th century, and the balustrade surrounding the west front; both are Grade II listed.

The churchyard also contains the Redcliffe Pipe; a conduit originally given by Robert de Berkeley in 1190 to supply fresh water to the church. Berkeley was Lord of Bedminster Manor and he granted the construction of a 2,514 metres (8,248 ft) long pipe from Knowle Hill to St Mary Redcliffe. A yearly walk along the route of the pipe continues to this day. Damaged in the Bristol Blitz, the present pipe terminates near the balustrade in front of the west front, featuring a brass drinking fountain from 1823, though the water from the pipe does not actually enter the fountain.

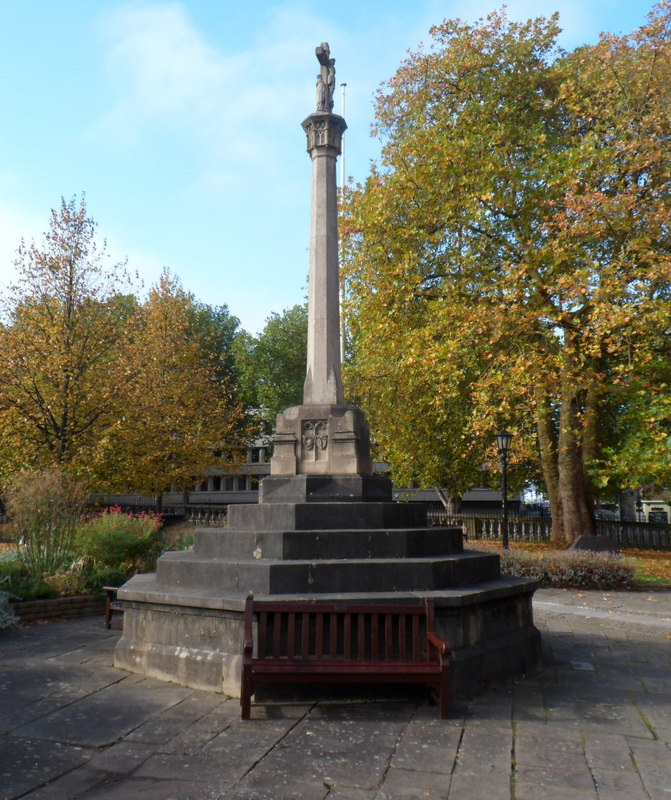

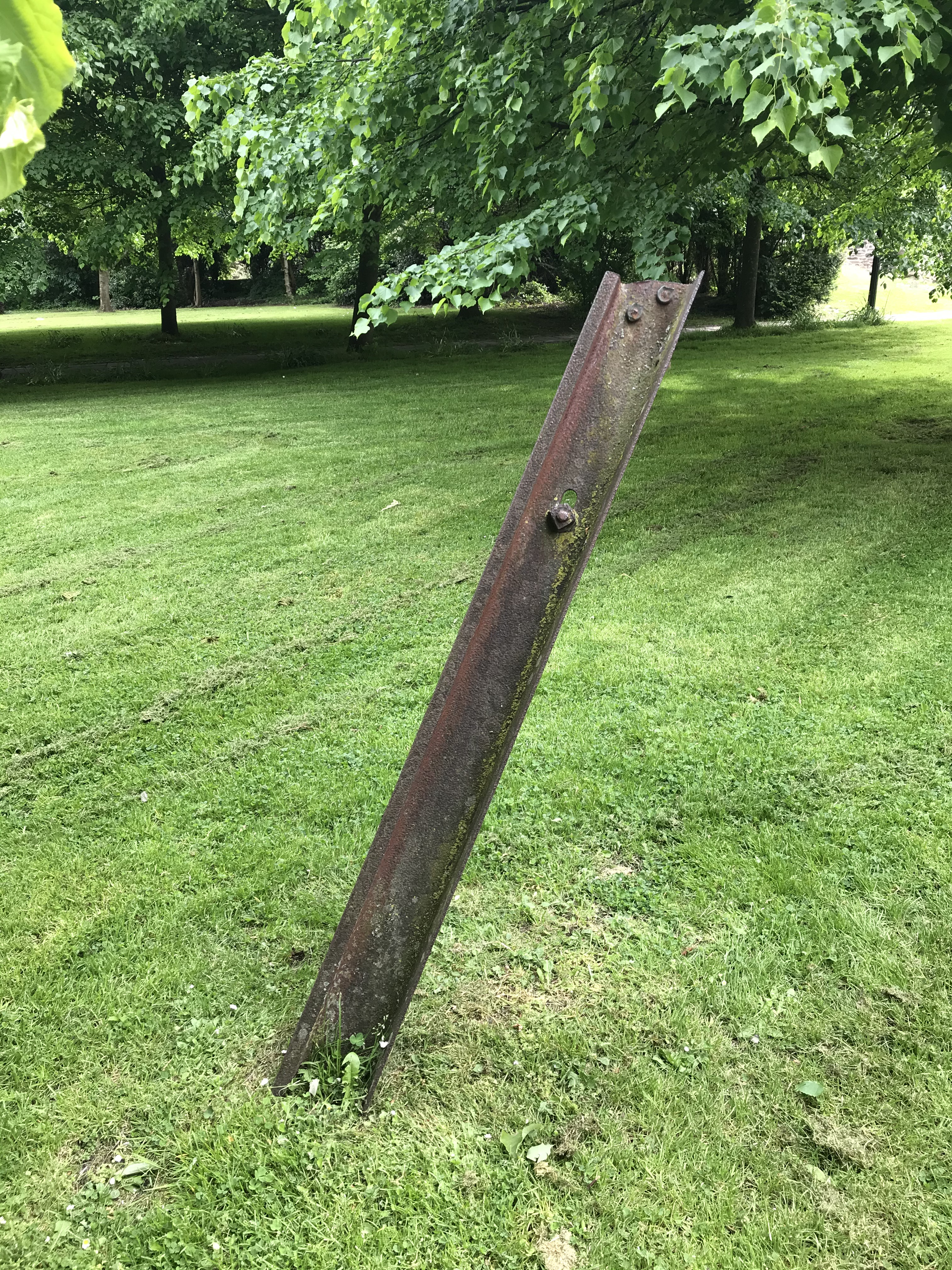
Tram rail embedded in the churchyard

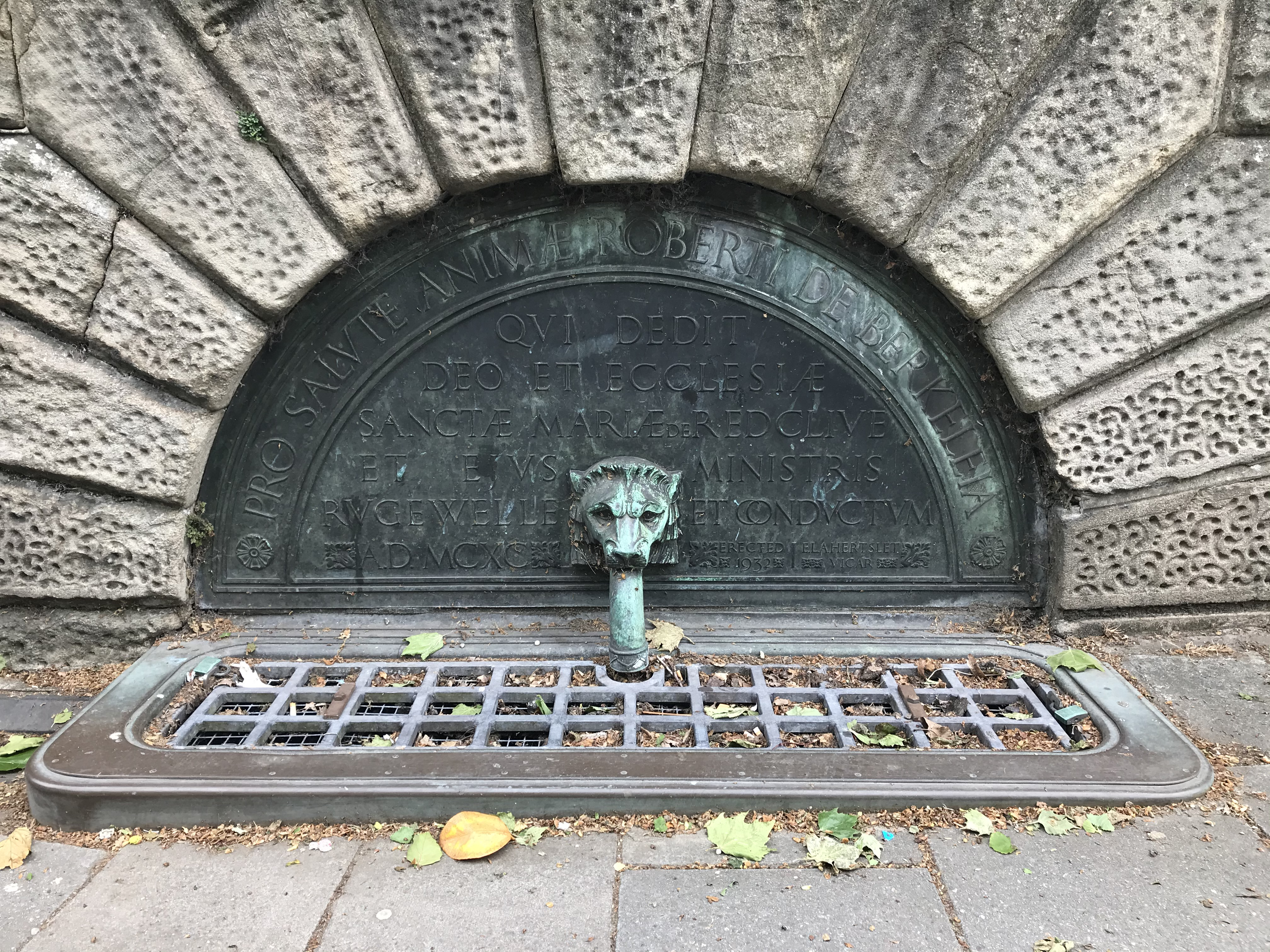
Fountain at the end of the Redcliffe Pipe

== See also ==
- Churches in Bristol
- Grade I listed buildings in Bristol
- List of tallest buildings and structures in Bristol
- List of tallest church buildings in the United Kingdom
