= List of schools in Wakefield =

This is a list of schools in the City of Wakefield in the English county of West Yorkshire.

== State-funded schools ==
=== Primary schools ===
- Ackton Pastures Primary Academy, Whitwood
- Ackworth Howard CE Junior and Infant School, Low Ackworth
- Ackworth Mill Dam School, Ackworth
- Airedale Infant School, Airedale
- Airedale Junior School, Airedale
- Alverthorpe St Paul's CE School, Alverthorpe
- Ash Grove Primary Academy, South Elmsall
- Badsworth CE Junior and Infant School, Badsworth
- Carleton Park Junior and Infant School, Carleton
- Carlton Junior and Infant School, South Elmsall
- Castleford Park Junior Academy, Castleford
- Castleford Three Lane Ends Academy, Castleford
- Castleford Townville Infants' School, Castleford
- Castleford Wheldon Infant School, Castleford
- Cherry Tree Academy, Pontefract
- Crigglestone St James CE Primary Academy, Crigglestone
- Crofton Infant School, Crofton
- Crofton Junior School, Crofton
- Dane Royd Junior and Infant School, Hall Green
- De Lacy Primary School, Pontefract
- Dimple Well Infant School, Ossett
- England Lane Academy, Knottingley
- English Martyrs RC Primary School, Lupset
- Fairburn View Primary School, Airedale
- Featherstone All Saints CE Academy, Featherstone
- Fitzwilliam Primary School, Fitzwilliam
- Flanshaw Junior and Infant School, Flanshaw
- Flushdyke Junior and Infant School, Flushdyke
- Gawthorpe Community Academy, Gawthorpe
- Girnhill Infant School, Featherstone
- Glasshoughton Infant Academy, Castleford
- Grove Lea Primary School, Hemsworth
- Half Acres Primary Academy, Castleford
- Halfpenny Lane Junior and Infant School, Pontefract
- Hendal Primary School, Kettlethorpe
- Holy Family and St Michael's RC Primary School, Pontefract
- Horbury Bridge CE Junior and Infant Academy, Horbury
- Horbury Primary Academy, Horbury
- Jerry Clay Academy, Wrenthorpe
- King's Meadow Academy, Fitzwilliam
- Larks Hill Junior and Infant School, Pontefract
- Lawefield Primary School, Thornes
- Lee Brig Infant School, Altofts
- Mackie Hill Junior and Infant School, Crigglestone
- Martin Frobisher Infant School, Altofts
- Methodist Junior and Infants School, Thornes
- Middlestown Primary Academy, Middlestown
- Moorthorpe Primary School, Moorthorpe
- The Mount Junior and Infant School, Thornes
- Newlands Primary School, Normanton
- Newton Hill Community School, Newton Hill
- Normanton All Saints CE Infant School, Normanton
- Normanton Altofts Junior School, Altofts
- Normanton Common Primary Academy, Normanton
- Normanton Junior Academy, Normanton
- North Featherstone Junior and Infant School, Featherstone
- Northfield Primary School, South Kirkby
- Orchard Head Junior and Infant School, Pontefract
- Ossett Holy Trinity CE Primary School, Ossett
- Ossett South Parade Primary, Ossett
- Outwood Primary Academy Bell Lane, Ackworth
- Outwood Primary Academy Greenhill, East Moor
- Outwood Primary Academy Kirkhamgate, Kirkhamgate
- Outwood Primary Academy Ledger Lane, Outwood
- Outwood Primary Academy Lofthouse Gate, Lofthouse Gate
- Outwood Primary Academy Newstead Green, Havercroft
- Outwood Primary Academy Park Hill, East Moor
- Oyster Park Primary Academy, Ferry Fryston
- Pinders Primary School, East Moor
- Purston Infant School, Featherstone
- The Rookeries Carleton Junior and Infant School, Carleton
- Rooks Nest Academy, Outwood
- Ryhill Junior and Infant School, Ryhill
- Sacred Heart RC Primary School, Hemsworth
- St Austin's RC Primary School, East Moor
- St Botolph's CE Academy, Knottingley
- St Giles CE Academy, Pontefract
- St Helen's CE Primary School, Hemsworth
- St Ignatius RC Primary School, Ossett
- St John the Baptist RC Primary School, Normanton
- St Joseph's RC Primary School, Castleford
- St Joseph's RC Primary School, Moorthorpe
- St Joseph's RC Primary School, Pontefract
- St Michael's CE Academy, Flanshaw
- St Peter's and Clifton CE Primary School, Horbury
- St Thomas' CE Junior School, Featherstone
- Sandal Castle Community Primary School, Sandal Magna
- Sandal Magna Junior and Infant School, Agbrigg
- Sharlston Community School, Sharlston
- Shay Lane Primary School, Crofton
- Simpson's Lane Academy, Knottingley
- Sitlington Netherton Junior and Infant School, Netherton
- Smawthorne Henry Moore Primary School, Castleford
- South Hiendley Primary School, South Hiendley
- South Kirkby Academy, South Kirkby
- South Kirkby Common Road Infant and Nursery School, South Kirkby
- South Ossett Infant Academy, Ossett
- Southdale CE Junior School, Ossett
- Stanley Grove Academy, Stanley
- Stanley St Peter's CE Junior and Infant School, Stanley
- Streethouse Primary School, Streethouse
- Towngate Primary Academy, Ossett
- Upton Primary School, Upton
- The Vale Primary Academy, Knottingley
- Wakefield St John's CE Junior and Infant School, Wakefield
- Wakefield St Mary's CE Primary School, East Moor
- Wakefield Snapethorpe Primary School, Lupset
- Walton Primary Academy, Walton
- West Bretton Junior and Infant School, West Bretton
- West End Academy, Hemsworth
- Willow Green Academy, Ferrybridge
- Wrenthorpe Academy, Wrenthorpe

=== Secondary schools ===
- Airedale Academy, Airedale
- Carleton High School, Carleton
- Castleford Academy, Castleford
- Crofton Academy, Crofton
- De Lacy Academy, Knottingley
- The Featherstone Academy, Featherstone
- Horbury Academy, Horbury
- Kettlethorpe High School, Kettlethorpe
- The King's School, Pontefract
- Minsthorpe Community College, South Elmsall
- Ossett Academy, Ossett
- Outwood Academy City Fields, East Moor
- Outwood Academy Freeston, Normanton
- Outwood Academy Hemsworth, Hemsworth
- Outwood Grange Academy, Outwood
- St Thomas à Becket Catholic Secondary School, Sandal Magna
- St Wilfrid's Catholic High School, Featherstone
- Trinity Academy Cathedral, Thornes

=== Special and alternative schools ===
- Enrich Academy, Crofton
- Evolve Academy, Lupset
- High Well School, Pontefract
- Highfield School, Ossett
- Kingsland Primary School, Stanley
- Oakfield Park School, Ackworth
- Pinderfields Hospital PRU, Wrenthorpe

=== Further education ===
- CAPA College
- New College, Pontefract
- Wakefield College

== Independent schools ==
=== Primary and preparatory schools ===
- Wakefield Grammar Pre-Preparatory School, Wakefield

=== Senior and all-through schools ===
- Ackworth School, Ackworth
- Queen Elizabeth Grammar School, Wakefield
- Silcoates School, Wrenthorpe
- Wakefield Girls' High School, Wakefield
- Wakefield Independent School, Nostell

=== Special and alternative schools ===
- Compass Community School Hemsworth, Hemsworth
- Denby Grange School, Netherton
- Falcons Learning, Goole
- The Grange School, Ossett
- Hall Cliffe Primary School, Wrenthorpe
- Hall Cliffe School, Horbury
- Ivy Lane School, East Moor
- Meadowcroft School, East Moor
- TLG Wakefield, Normanton
