= A Kind of Loving =

A Kind of Loving may refer to:

- A Kind of Loving (novel)
- A Kind of Loving (film)
