= Pontefract and District Girls High School =

Coordinates: 53.694°N 1.326°W

Location
- Park Lane; Pontefract, West Yorkshire; England

Information
- Type: Grammar school
- Established: 1912
- Closed: 1987
- Gender: Girls
- Age: 11 to 18

Pontefract and District Girls High School (aka Pontefract Girls' High School) was a grammar school for girls in Pontefract, West Yorkshire, England.

== History ==
The school on the site was originally built in the Victorian era as a slaughter house before being demolished. It was established in 1912 and closed when in 1987, Pontefract schools lost their sixth forms, with a sixth form college being established at NEW College, Pontefract on the same site. There was a centenary celebration in 2012.

The school had its own magazine.

== Notable alumnae ==
- Jane Brooke, crime writer
- Barbara Castle, Baroness Castle of Blackburn, politician
- Jane Collins, former MEP and UKIP politician
- Shirley Nolan, medical campaigner set up "Anthony Nolan" register

== See also ==
- The King's School, Pontefract
