= African Caribbean Leukaemia Trust =

UK charity

- Abbreviation: ACLT
- Founded: 1996
- Type: Charity
- Purpose: To raise awareness of stem cell, blood and organ donation within black and ethnic minority communities
- Headquarters: 2A Garnet Road, Thornton Heath, Surrey, CR7 8RD
- Region served: United Kingdom
- Website: aclt.org

African Caribbean Leukaemia Trust (ACLT) is an independent UK charity for people with leukaemia and other life-threatening disorders. The ACLT aims to raise awareness on stem cell, blood and organ donation in the UK, with a particular focus on black and mixed race communities.

== History ==
Six-year-old Daniel De-Gale was diagnosed with leukaemia in 1993. His survival required a stem cell transplant; as stem cells have racially-specific characteristics, the donor had to be from the black or mixed race population. With only 550 registered donors, there was a 1 in 250,000 chance of finding a matching donor for Daniel. His parents, Beverley De-Gale and Orin Lewis, therefore identified the need for an organisation to raise awareness and increase the number of donors, and co-founded the African Caribbean Leukaemia Trust in 1996. In 1999, Daniel, 12, became the first black person in the UK to receive a life-saving bone marrow transplant from an unrelated donor.

By 2008 ACLT had enlisted corporate support and established patrons and trustees, including the first winner of the television programme The Apprentice Tim Campbell and ex-world heavyweight boxing champion, David Haye.

On 8 October 2008, Daniel De-Gale, aged 21, died due to further health complications. Since 2009, the 'Daniel De-Gale Blood Donation Month' each October, along with other ACLT recruitment initiatives, has raised the base level of potential donors from 100s to tens of 1,000s. The ACLT continues to raise awareness surrounding stem cell (bone marrow), blood and organ donation to increase the number of ethnic minority people entered on stem cell, blood and organ donor registers.

== Awards and achievements ==
In 2006, the ACLT received a Daily Mirror Pride of Britain Special Achievement Award. Beverley and Orin were awarded with OBEs in the 2011 Birthday Honours and 2012 New Year Honours respectively, for services to healthcare.

=== Awards ===
Organisation	Award	Year	Awarded to
Croydon Guardian	Croydon Champion	2002	Daniel De-Gale
Pride of Britain	Special Achievement Award	2006	Beverley De-Gale & Orin Lewis
Barclays, East Surrey & Sussex News Media	Heart of the Community	2009	ACLT
	OBE	2011	Beverley De-Gale
Music Video & Screen Awards	Westmore Ezekiel Award	2012	ACLT
	OBE	2012	Orin Lewis
Royal College of Pathologists	Oliver Memorial Award 2013	2013	ACLT
National Diversity Awards	Community Organisation Award for Race, Religion & Faith	2014	ACLT
Health Service Journal	BME Pioneer	2014	Beverley De-Gale & Orin Lewis

Orin Lewis is chair of the National BME Cancer Voice, co-chair of the National BAME Transplant Alliance, a member of the National Cancer Equalities Initiative advisory group and a member of the Blood and Marrow Transplantation Clinical Reference Group.

== Partners ==
ACLT works with partner organisations including:

- NHS Blood & Transplant, the authority responsible for supplying blood for transplants
- Anthony Nolan, the UK's largest bone marrow registry, working with them on the Being African Caribbean campaign.
- DKMS, the world's largest stem cell donor centre
- University African Caribbean Societies (ACS)
- Capital Xtra
- Metropolitan Police Service
