= Listed buildings in Ossett =

Ossett is a town in the metropolitan district of the City of Wakefield, West Yorkshire, England. The ward contains twelve listed buildings that are recorded in the National Heritage List for England. Of these, one is listed at Grade II*, the middle of the three grades, and the others are at Grade II, the lowest grade. The ward contains the town of Ossett, the village of Gawthorpe, and the surrounding area. The listed buildings include houses, former industrial buildings, a pair of locks on the Calder and Hebble Navigation, two churches, a town hall, a water tower, a war memorial, and a telephone kiosk.

== Key ==
Grade	Criteria
II*	Particularly important buildings of more than special interest
II	Buildings of national importance and special interest

== Buildings ==
Name and location	Photograph	Date	Notes	Grade
Figure of Three Locks; 53.66625°N 1.59740°W		c. 1769	A pair of locks on the Calder and Hebble Navigation with stone sides. On the north there is a pavement between the locks, and culverts on the south. There are two pairs of wooden gates.	II
Former Holme Leas Inn; 53.69170°N 1.59099°W		Early 19th century	Originally industrial premises, at one time a public house, the building is in stone, rendered on the right and at the rear, with a stone slate roof. There are three storeys and five bays. The doorway is in the right bay, and the windows are mullioned.	II
Healey New Mill and chimney 53.66646°N 1.59370°W	—	1826–27	The former mill is in stone and brick, with stone slate roofs. The main building has three storeys and an attic and eight bays, to the south is a one-bay engine house, and then a further two bays. To the west is a further three-bay block attached to the chimney. The chimney has a square stone base, and the upper part is in brick and tapering.	II
22 and 24 Wesley Street; 53.68007°N 1.58243°W	—	Early to mid 19th century	A warehouse later used for other purposes, it is in stone with a stone slate roof. There are two storeys and three bays. The windows are mullioned, and one window has been converted into a doorway.	II
Springstone House; 53.68632°N 1.57859°W	—	Mid 19th century	The house, which was later extended, is in stone with sill bands, a moulded eaves cornice and blocking course, and a hipped Welsh slate roof. There are two storeys, a symmetrical front of three bays, and flanking slightly projecting single storey single-bay wings. In the centre is a portico with fluted Tuscan columns, pilasters, a decorative frieze, and a pediment, and the doorway has a fanlight. The windows in the ground floor are sashes, in the upper floor they are casements, the central window with an architrave and a cornice. In the wings are tripartite bow windows, and at the rear is a round-headed stair window.	II
Holy Trinity Church; 53.68606°N 1.58281°W		1862–65	The church was designed by W. H. Crossland in Early English style, and the south chapel was added in 1925. It is in stone with a Welsh slate roof, and has a cruciform plan. The church consists of a nave with a clerestory, north and south aisles, a south porch, north and south transepts, a chancel with aisles and a south chapel, and a steeple at the crossing. The steeple has a tower with angle buttresses that rise to crocketed pinnacles, clock faces, and a pierced bracketed parapet, and is surmounted by an octagonal spire with three pierced bands. The west and east windows each has five lights.	II*
Former Primitive Methodist Chapel; 53.67681°N 1.58047°W		1863	The church was later extended at the rear, and has since been used for other purposes. It is in stone on a plinth, with quoins, a band, and a Welsh slate roof. There are two storeys, three bays and a basement. The middle bay projects on the front, it contains a doorway approached by steps, with a round head and a fanlight. The basement windows have square heads, and the other windows are sashes with round-arched heads. In the pediment is an inscribed and dated tablet.	II
Park House; 53.66927°N 1.57907°W		c. 1870	A stone house, later incorporated into Ossett Academy, with embattled parapets, and a Welsh slate roof with coped gables. There are two storeys and attics, and an T-shaped plan, with a main range of five bays, and a two-bay rear wing. The entrances have moulded surrounds and an embattled cornice. Most of the windows are mullioned and transomed, some with hood moulds, and there is a canted bay window and a stair window.	II
Town Hall; 53.67996°N 1.57935°W		1905–08	The town hall is in stone, with moulded sill bands, a moulded cornice and a decorated frieze between the floors, a moulded eaves cornice, and a Welsh slate roof. There are two storeys, and a symmetrical front of twelve bays. In the centre is a round-arched portal with a keystone, flanked by caryatids with foliated brackets carrying a balcony. Above is a round gable with a tapering finial, and on the roof is a two-stage clock tower with an octagonal cupola with a lead dome. The outer three bays at each end project under a larger round gable containing an oculus surrounded by carving. The ground floor windows have square heads, and in the upper floor they have round heads with ornamental spandrels, and are divided by Ionic pilasters.	II
Gawthorpe Water Tower; 53.69936°N 1.59398°W		1922–28	The water tower is in reinforced concrete and has a circular plan and four stages. The lowest stage is drum-shaped, and contains a doorway with an architrave. The second stage is the tallest, and has a central circular shaft surrounded by concentric pillars. The third stage consists of a circular water tank with recessed panelling, a moulded fascia and cornice below, and a plain frieze above. On the top is a conical roof surmounted by a domed cupola with a ball finial and an arcaded drum.	II
War memorial 53.67945°N 1.57984°W		1928	The war memorial is in Market Place, and consists of a life-size bronze statue of a soldier with a rifle standing on a grey granite obelisk, on a pedestal with a base of two steps. On the obelisk is a bronze laurel wreath and an inscription relating to the First World War, around the foot is a bronze garland, and on the pedestal is an inscription relating to the Second World War.	II
Telephone kiosk 53.67998°N 1.57996°W	—	1935	A K6 type telephone kiosk, designed by Giles Gilbert Scott. Constructed in cast iron with a square plan and a dome, it has three unperforated crowns in the top panels.	II
