= New College, Pontefract =

New College

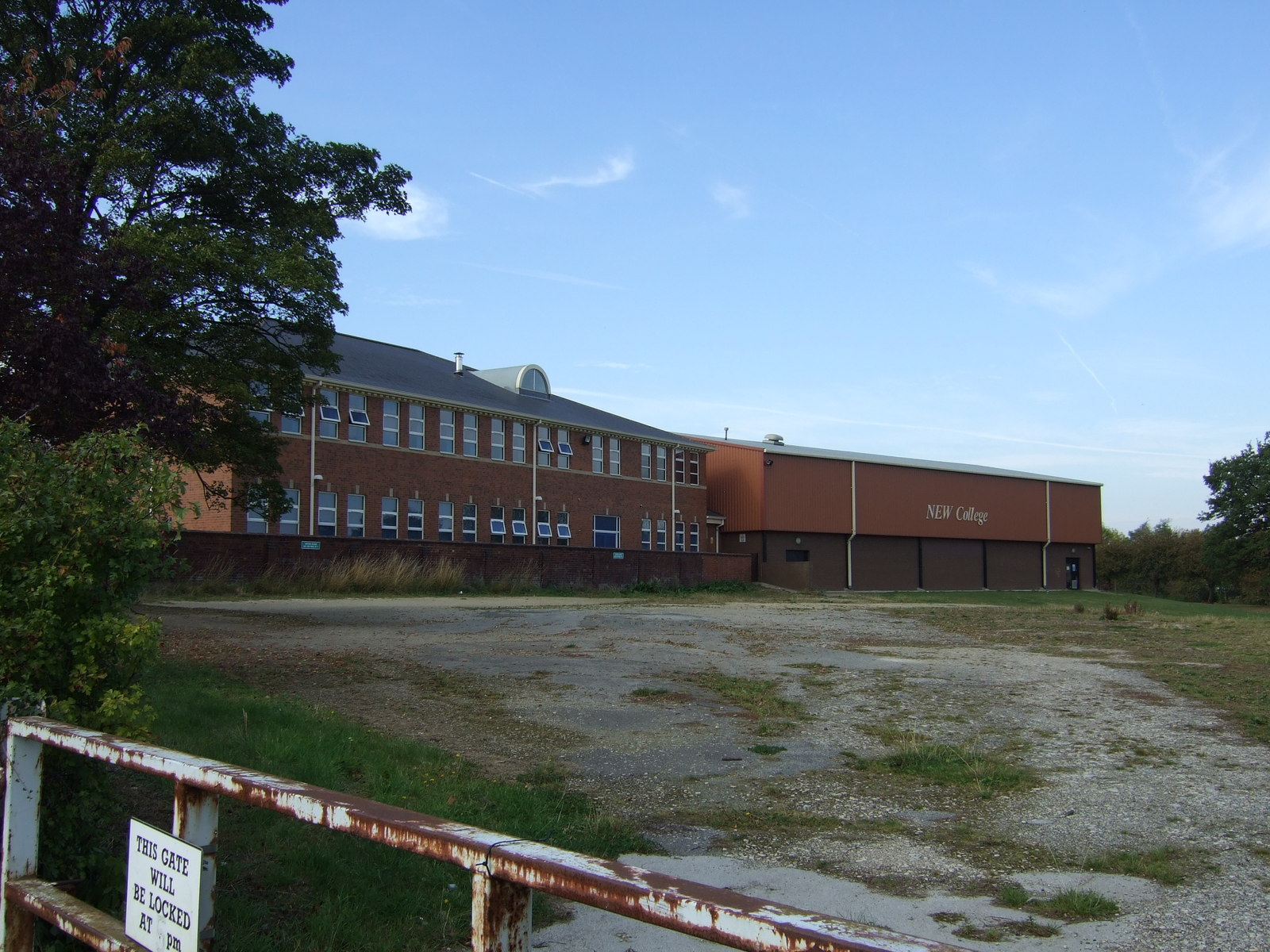

Location
- Park Lane; Pontefract, West Yorkshire, WF8 4QR; England; 53.694°N 1.326°W

Information
- Type: Sixth Form College
- Motto: Enjoy, Succeed, Progress
- Established: 1987
- Trust: New Collaborative Learning Trust
- Ofsted: Reports
- Principal: Vicky Marks
- Age: 16 to 19
- Enrolment: 2500 (approx)
- Website: http://www.ncpontefract.ac.uk/

New College is a coeducational, sixth form college in Pontefract in West Yorkshire, England. It acquired academy status in 2017, forming a trust to open colleges in other areas, called the New Collaborative Learning Trust. At its Ofsted inspection in 2014 it was rated outstanding. In 2023 it was again rated outstanding.

== History ==
The school on the site was originally built in the Victorian era as a slaughter house before being demolished, later it became the Pontefract Girls' High School, before finally opening as the college in 1987. In 1987 it became north east Wakefield's sixth form college known as NEW college. Previously the Motto of the college was nos excellentia per nostrum discipulus primoris ('We achieve excellence by putting our students first').

The college is now part of an academies trust named the New Collaborative Learning Trust. The CEO, Richard Fletcher, was previously the Principal at the college.

== Academics ==
In the academic year 2013–14 NEW College Pontefract was Ofsted Outstanding, with inspectors highlighting their heightened success rates, the development of students skills, regular rigorous assessment, and a successful management that create a culture of high expectations. They were encouraged to continue with high standards, and introduce more opportunities to look at the world of work.

On 16 May 2023, the college was once again graded Ofsted Outstanding with The quality of education, Behaviour and attitudes, Personal development, Leadership and management, Education programmes for young people, and Provision for learners with high needs all graded as Outstanding.

In September 2016 a new New College Doncaster was opened by the NCLT with New College Bradford opened in September 2019.

In October 2020 it won the sixth-form college of the year at the Tes FE Awards 2020, achieving top in the country. The college was praised for its 100% pass rate and high grades making up 60% at A-level and 90% in BTEC courses. It was also praised by the judges for its employability training and training for progression to higher education, and its wide range on extracurricular and supercurricular activities.

== Notable alumni ==
- Tim Bresnan – England international cricketer.
- Tom Briscoe – Rugby league player for Super League side Leeds Rhinos, who graduated in 2008
- Rich Johnston – Cartoonist, writer and journalist, founder of Bleeding Cool, writer on Watchmensch, Doctor Who, and The Avengefuls, and cartoonist for the Count Binface Comic and Guido Fawkes' Monday Morning View.
- Gill Isles – comedy TV producer, including shows such as Ideal, Peter Kay's Car Share, Gavin And Stacey, Alma's Not Normal, Man Like Mobeen, Detectorists and Small Prophets.
- Waen Shepherd - comedian, writer and actor, known for the character Gary Le Strange, regularly appearing in The Inbetweeners as Mister Kennedy, and series composer for Crackanory and Murder in Successville.
- Ryan Hall – Rugby League player for Super League side Leeds Rhinos
- Cameron Smith – Rugby League player for Super League side Leeds Rhinos
