= GEMoaB Monoclonals =

- Type: GmbH
- Industry: Biotechnology; Pharmaceutical
- Founded: 2011
- Founder: Gerhard Ehninger, Michael Bachmann
- Headquarters: Dresden, Germany
- Key people: Arnim Ehninger, Chief Scientific Officer (CSO), Gerhard Ehninger (CMO)
- Products: GEM333; GEM3PSCA; UniCAR-T-CD 123, UniCAR-T-PSMA
- Revenue: n.a.
- Website: www.gemoab.com

GEMoaB is a biopharmaceutical company based in Dresden/Germany. The company has a broad pipeline of next generation immunotherapy product candidates for the treatment of advanced blood cancers and solid tumours in pre-clinical and clinical development. The company was founded in 2011 by the two university professors Gerhard Ehninger and Michael Bachmann. It was acquired by the new company AvenCell Therapeutics in 2021.

== Company background ==
To overcome the limitations of current cellular immunotherapies, GEMoaB has established two cellular immunotherapy platforms, which are called UniCAR & RevCAR. These genetically modified T-cells can be rapidly and repeatedly turned on and off via dosing of so-called Targeting Modules (TMs), which crosslink UniCAR/RevCAR T-effector cells with malignant target cells. Upon cross-linkage, UniCAR/RevCAR T-cells are activated and expanded and eliminate malignant target cells. They can be rapidly turned off after TM withdrawal, promising to avoid T-effector cell exhaustion and to reduce potential side effects typically associated with CAR-T therapies.

== Scientific and strategic board ==
The company's scientific and strategic board is composed of: Gerhard Ehninger (Chairman), Michael Bachmann (Germany), Katy Rezvani (U.S.A.), Bob Löwenberg (The Netherlands) as well as Thomas de Maizière, Member of Parliament (Germany).

== Co-operations ==
Gemoab co-operates with a range of partners: its sister company Cellex in Cologne, Germany, the Fraunhofer-Institut, the pharmaceutical company Bristol-Myers Squibb as well as the companies ABX, Bio Elpida and the federal Saxonian Ministry of Science and Research.

== Drugs currently under development ==
- GEM333: T-cell engaging bispecific antibody (TCE) against CD33 in AML
- GEM3PSCA, TCE against PSCA in Prostate Cancer and other PSCA expressing solid tumours
- UniCAR-T-CD 123 for the treatment of AML, ALL and certain lymphomas
- UniCAR-T-PSMA for the treatment of a number of PSMA expressing tumours

== Literatur ==
- Mitwasi, N; Feldmann, A; Arndt, C; Koristka, S; Berndt, N; Jureczek, J; Loureiro, LR; Bergmann, R; Máthé, D; Hegedüs, N; Kovács, T; Zhang, C; Oberoi, P; Jäger, E; Seliger, B; Rössig, C; Temme, A; Eitler, J; Tonn, T; Schmitz, M; Hassel, JC; Jäger, D; Wels, WS; Bachmann, M (2020). ""UniCAR"-modified off-the-shelf NK-92 cells for targeting of GD2-expressing tumour cells". Sci Rep. 10: 2141. doi:10.1038/s41598-020-59082-4. PMC 7005792. PMID 32034289..
- Loff, S.; Meyer, J.-E.; Dietrich, J.; Spehr, J.; Julia, R.; von Bonin, M.; Gründer, C.; Franke, K.; Feldmann, A.; Bachmann, M.; Ehninger, G.; Ehninger, A.; Cartellieri, M. (2018). "Late-Stage Preclinical Characterization of Switchable CD123-Specific CAR-T for Treatment of Acute Leukemia". Blood. 132: 964–964. doi:10.1182/blood-2018-99-113288.
- Arndt, C; Feldmann, A; Koristka, S; Schäfer, M; Bergmann, R; Mitwasi, N; Berndt, N; Bachmann, D; Kegler, A; Schmitz, M; Puentes-Cala, E; Soto, JA; Ehninger, G; Pietzsch, J; Liolios, C; Wunderlich, G; Kotzerke, J; Kopka, K; Bachmann, M (2019). "A theranostic PSMA ligand for PET imaging and retargeting of T cells expressing the universal chimeric antigen receptor UniCAR". Oncoimmunology. 8 1659095. doi:10.1080/2162402X.2019.1659095. PMC 6791425. PMID 31646084..
- Arndt, C; von Bonin, M; Cartellieri, M; Feldmann, A; Koristka, S; Michalk, I; Stamova, S; Bornhäuser, M; Schmitz, M; Ehninger, G; Bachmann, M (2013). "Redirection of T cells with a first fully humanized bispecific CD33-CD3 antibody efficiently eliminates AML blasts without harming hematopoietic stem cells". Leukemia. 27: 964–7. doi:10.1038/leu.2013.18. PMID 23325142..

== See also ==
- Gene therapy
- DKMS
