= Kettlethorpe =

Kettlethorpe may refer to:

- Kettlethorpe, Lincolnshire, England
- Kettlethorpe, West Yorkshire, England
