= John Goldman =

John Goldman may refer to:

- John D. Goldman (born 1949), American businessman and philanthropist
- John M. Goldman (1938–2013), British haematologist, oncologist and medical researcher
