= Simon Dyson (businessman) =

British businessman

Simon M Dyson
- Born: 1950 (age 75–76); Kingston upon Hull, East Riding of Yorkshire, England
- Occupation: Businessman

Simon M Dyson MBE, FCAA (born 1950 Kingston upon Hull, East Riding of Yorkshire) is an English businessman. From 1987 to 2017, Simon was the Chairman of the Anthony Nolan board of directors. Dyson also worked for the Associated Newspapers Ltd as their Group Finance Director. In 2003, Dyson was named a Member of the British Empire. Dyson has four kids and is in a marriage.
