= King's School, Pontefract =

The King's School
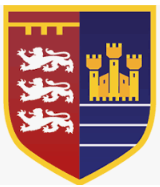

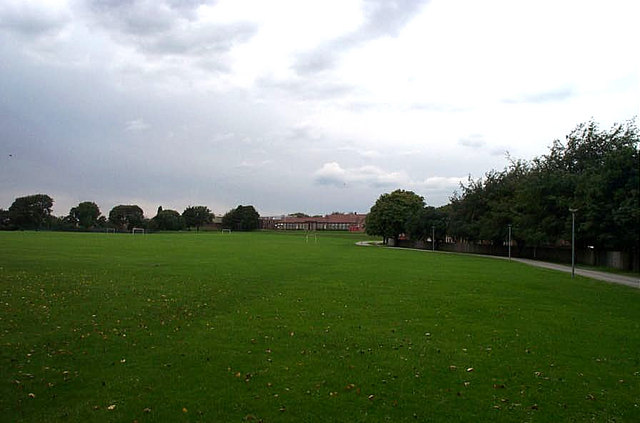

Location
- Mill Hill Lane; Pontefract, West Yorkshire, WF8 4JF; England; 53.68540°N 1.31858°W

Information
- Type: Academy
- Established: 1139; 887 years ago
- Founder: Edward VI
- Department for Education URN: 139500 Tables
- Ofsted: Reports
- Headteacher: M Evans
- Staff: 113
- Gender: Coeducational
- Age: 11 to 16
- Enrolment: 1022
- Website: https://carletonhigh.patrust.org.uk/

The King's School is a coeducational comprehensive secondary school with academy status, located in Pontefract, West Yorkshire, England. It is one of the four oldest schools in Yorkshire, dating from 1139 and was refounded by King Edward VI in 1548.

== History ==
King's School Pontefract was founded in 1139. Little documentation survives from its early years, and it was refounded in the reign of King Edward VI. It has been associated with the Duchy of Lancaster since 1588 when it was given an endowment to allow it to continue functioning. In 1792 it was refounded yet again by George III who is the eponymous king. Annual payments of £50 were made by the Duchy of Lancaster until 1869. It closed in the 1880s but reopened on 4 May 1890 and has continued to the present day, although it was relocated in 1932.

=== Grammar school ===
The present buildings were opened on 14 July 1932 by Sir F. Stanley Jackson. It was a boys' grammar school with around 650 boys, operated by the West Riding County Council.

=== Comprehensive ===
The school became a comprehensive with a sixth form in 1978. Pontefract Girls' High School, the girls' grammar school became New College, Pontefract, and 11-18 school. In 1987, Pontefract schools lost their sixth form, with a sixth form college being established at New College, Pontefract.

=== Academy ===
The school converted to academy status on 1 April 2013 and is one of two high schools with Carleton High School in Pontefract Academies Trust.

== Admissions ==
The school is currently situated on a raised area near Ackworth Road in Pontefract, along Mill Hill Lane, southwest of the town centre and the A645/A639 crossroads. There are over 1,000 pupils, 60 teaching staff and 53 additional staff. The school's current Headteacher is Mrs Marie Evans. The King's School, Carleton High School and many of the Primary Schools in the two pyramids are now members of Pontefract Academies Trust (previously, Pontefract Education Trust)

== Sport ==
The school's sporting traditions include rugby union (the year 11 team reached the final of the Yorkshire Cup in 2006), and athletics, with some pupils achieving local and national honours.

== Notable former pupils ==
- Derek Birdsall, graphic designer, who redesigned the Book of Common Prayer in 2000
- Ken Booth, E. H. Carr Professor of International Politics from 1999 to 2008 at Aberystwyth University
- Michael Eaton, former chief spokesman of the National Coal Board during the miners' strike
- Scott Grant KCB, Chief Royal Engineer from 1999 to 2004, Quartermaster-General to the Forces from 1998 to 2000, and Colonel Commandant from 1997 to 2004 of the Royal Engineers
- Henry John Poskitt, Roman Catholic Bishop of Leeds from 1936 to 1950
- Rich Johnston, cartoonist, writer and journalist
- Simon Thorp, Viz cartoonist
- Peter Townend, former social editor of Tatler
- Nick Revell, stand-up comedian and scriptwriter*

== See also ==
- List of the oldest schools in the United Kingdom
