= Pontefract Academies Trust =

English multi-academy trust

- Type: Academy Trust
- Purpose: Education
- Location: The Barracks Business Centre, Wakefield Road, Pontefract. WF8 4HH
- Services: Education
- Key people: Julian Appleyard OBE, CEO; Phil Jones, Chair of Governors
- Website: pontefractacademiestrust.org.uk
- Formerly called: Pontefract Education Trust

Pontefract Academies Trust is a multi-academy trust in the historic northern town of Pontefract, England. It is an exempt charity, regulated by the Department for Education The trust comprises nine academies, including two secondary schools and seven primary schools. It officially merged with Ark on 1 September 2026.

== Primary schools ==
The primary schools of the Trust consist of:

- Larks Hill J&I School
- De Lacy Primary School
- Orchard Head Junior Infant & Nursery School
- Carleton Park J&I School
- Rookeries Carleton Junior Infant & Nursery School
- Halfpenny Lane Junior Infant & Nursery School
- Northfield primary school

== Secondary schools ==
- Carleton High School
- The King's School
