= Healey, Ossett =

Village in West Yorkshire, England

Coordinates: 53.667922°N 1.591623°W

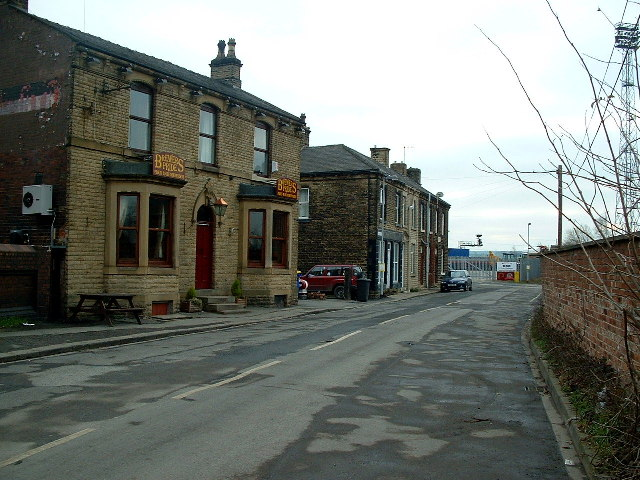
The 'Brewer's Pride' pub, Healey, formerly the 'Millers Arms Inn'

Healey is a small village and industrial district on the east bank of the River Calder in the southwestern outskirts of Ossett, near Wakefield in West Yorkshire, England. It developed during the industrial revolution when three cloth and fulling mills were built.

The abandoned Healey Mills Marshalling Yard is located to the east of the village, south of Ossett and west of Horbury between Wakefield Kirkgate railway station and Mirfield railway station on the former Manchester and Leeds Railway.

== History ==
There is evidence of human activity around Healey from prehistoric and historic times including Bronze Age burials, agriculture during the Roman period, quarrying but no agriculture during the medieval period, and ridge and furrow agriculture from the post medieval period. The River Calder was forded west of Healey by the Romans, and a ferry operated near to Healey New Mill.

The Calder and Hebble Navigation was built during latter half of the 18th century, and connected to the River Calder nearby by a lock. Healey Mill was established by 1791, Healey Low Mill by 1817. and Healey New Mill by 1827.

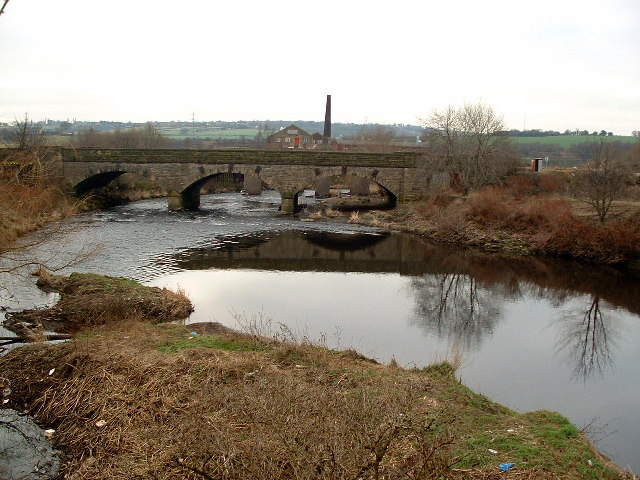
The 1850s railway bridge over the River Calder, the chimney of Healey New Mill in the background

The Manchester and Leeds Railway was built and passed through by 1840. As part of the construction a new cut was made in the Calder bypassing a sharp bend in the river, which in the course of the work severed the road to the mill. This resulted in a legal complaint from the owners of Healey New Mill which lay on the part of the Calder that would be bypassed. The courts found in the railway company's favour. A five arch bridge was built to carry the line over the new cut. Due to the delay in construction because of the court case, when the railway was opened, the Calder was crossed by a temporary wooden bridge. In 1851 the railway's owners announced that they planned to divert the river down the new cut, but the plan was never realised and a three span bridge was built replacing the wooden bridge.

By 1854 there were three separate mills and "The Millers Arms Inn" in the close area. The new cut was unconnected to the Calder River, the part north of the five span bridge was partially filled and used for the construction of a dyework (later becoming Calder Vale Mill), the southern part was used as a mill pond.

On Healey Road, Ossett Gas works was built in 1855, and a Sewage Works constructed to the south of it in the 1870s after the passing of the Local Government Board Act 1871. The original houses in Healey and on Healey Road were built in the late Victorian era.

In the 1960s the conversion of the sidings east of Healey into a modernised railway shunting yard brought several major changes. The route of the river Calder east of Healey was altered, being moved south to create more space for the new marshalling yard, the 1800s mill pond formed by the attempted re-routing of the Calder for the original Manchester and Leeds rail link was filled in, Healey Low Mill was demolished, the Healey Road sewage works removed, and three additional rail bridges built to carry the tracks across the Calder.

=== Healey Mills sidings ===
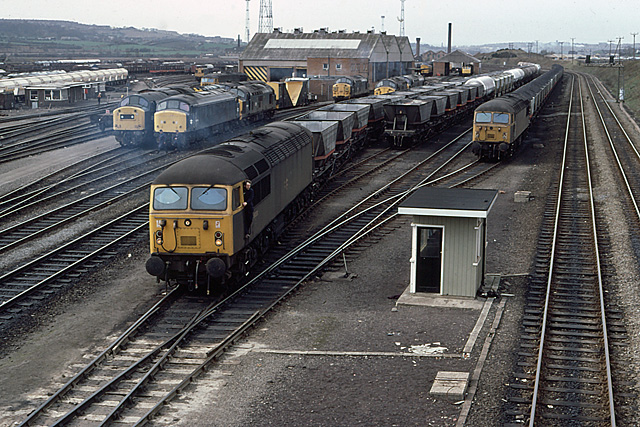
Healey Mill Yard and diesel depot in April 1982

By 1920 extensive railway sidings had been developed on the railway line east-southeast of Healey, named Healey Mill Sidings. In the 1960s, as part of a modernisation plan, the sidings were re-designed for more efficient wagon load handling.

Construction included cutting a new channel over 1,000 yards long for the River Calder south of the original, levelling of the site with over 1 million cubic yards of infill, the re-construction and extension of a road bridge at the east end of the site near Horbury Bridge, the construction of three railway bridges over the River Calder, and diversion of gas and electricity mains.

The new yard was built as a hump shunting (gravity) yard capable of handling 4,000 wagons a day. The reception sidings were built west of the River Calder, the main yard was built on the extended site of the former sidings. The main control tower was located south of the main line and the Calder Vale Dye Works near to the river. The yard opened in 1963 at a cost of £3.5 million. The diesel motive power depot at Healey Mills opened in 1967.

After the marshalling yard closed in 1987, the site was used for storage of trains and locomotives. After the privatisation of British Rail the site was operated by EWS; an assessment was made of a future requirement of six long doubled ended sidings and further short single ended sidings.

After 2010 the site's use was limited to crew changes; the driver depot at Healey Mills closed in 2012, being relocated to portacabins at Wakefield Kirkgate station after 4 February 2012.

== Today ==
Healey New Mill still exists and is used as industrial units. The mill and chimney are grade II listed buildings. The 1872 inn, The Millers Arms, exists as The Brewer's 1841. It was the founding place of Ossett Brewery in 1998.

Network Rail still own the Power Signal Box which is no longer operational, previously controlling trains from Horbury to Huddersfield (which includes the Transpennine route).

In 2011, Healey's only public transport service is the number 102 bus operated by Arriva Yorkshire on behalf of the West Yorkshire Metro which links to Wakefield via Ossett.
