= Ossett =

Town in West Yorkshire, England

Coordinates: 53.68°N 01.58°W

- Town
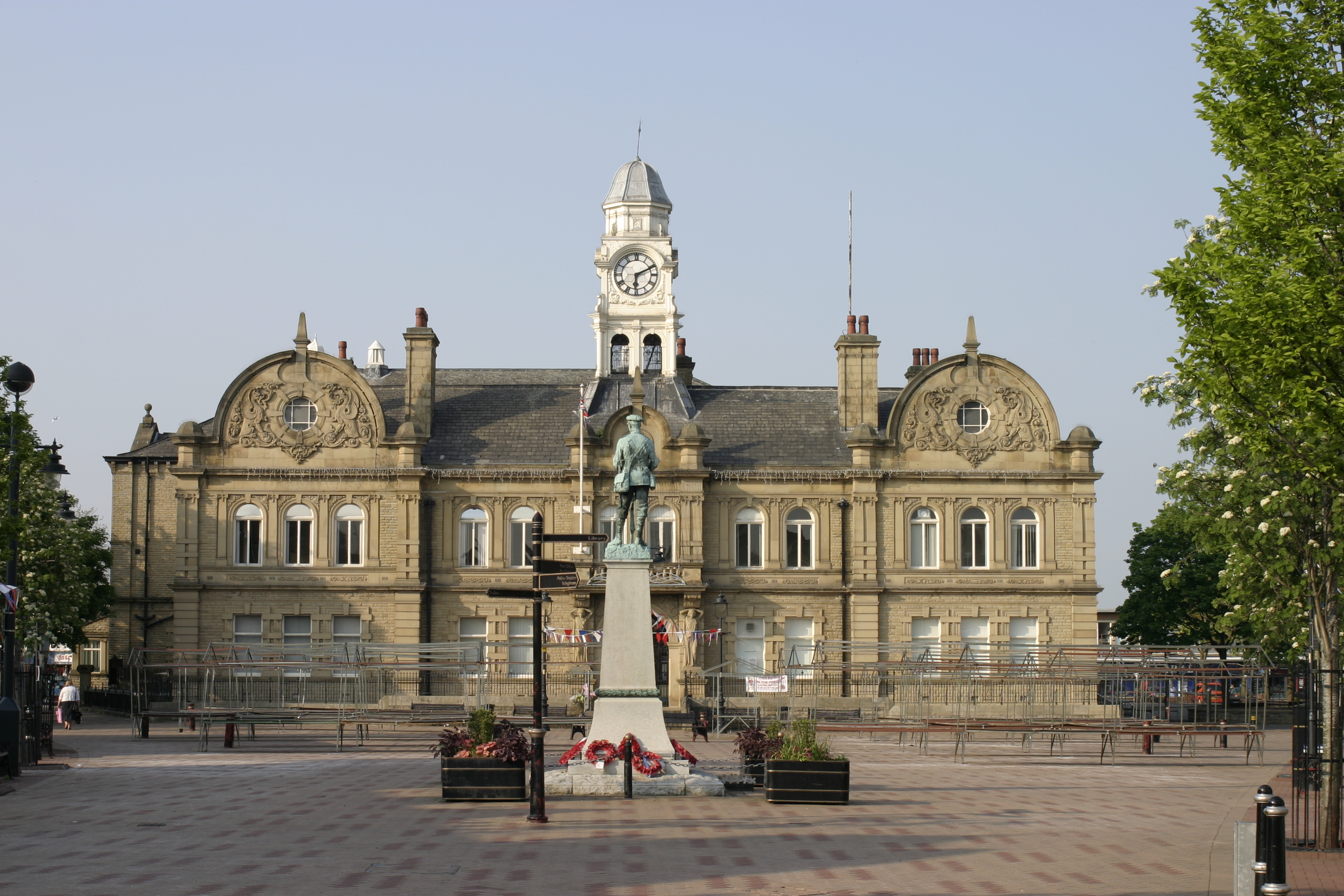
- Ossett Town Hall

- Location within West Yorkshire
- Population: 21,861 (2021 census)
- OS grid reference: SE279205
  - London: 186 mi SE
- Metropolitan borough: City of Wakefield
- Metropolitan county: West Yorkshire
- Region: Yorkshire and the Humber
- Country: England
- Sovereign state: United Kingdom
- Post town: OSSETT
- Postcode district: WF5
- Dialling code: 01924
- Police: West Yorkshire
- Fire: West Yorkshire
- Ambulance: Yorkshire
- UK Parliament: Ossett and Denby Dale

Ossett /ˈɒsɪt/ is a market and residential town in the Wakefield district, in the county of West Yorkshire, England. Historically part of the West Riding of Yorkshire, it is situated between Dewsbury, Horbury and Wakefield. At the 2021 census, the town had a population of 21,861. Ossett forms part of the Heavy Woollen District.

== History ==
=== Toponymy ===
The name Ossett derives from the Old English and is thought to be either "the fold of a man named Osla" or " a fold frequented by blackbirds". Ossett is sometimes misspelled as "Osset". In Ellis' On Early English Pronunciation, one of the founding works of British linguistics, the incorrect spelling is used. The British Library has an online dialect study that uses the spelling. One new alternative theory is that it is the place where King Osbehrt died after receiving fatal wounds when fighting the Great Heathen Army of the Vikings at York on 21 March 867. An exceedingly rare clustering of high status Anglian graves, one bearing the Anglian royal symbol of the dragon and the name Osbehrt, was found in the churchyard at Thornhill Parish Church, visible directly across the valley Ossett.

=== Origins ===
Ossett appears in the 1086 Domesday Book as "Osleset" in the Manor of Wakefield. The Domesday Book was compiled for William the Conqueror in 1086. "Osleset" was recorded as three and a half carucates which is the land needed to be ploughed by three teams of eight oxen. Woodland pasture measured "half a league long as much broad" (roughly six furlongs by six furlongs). Four villeins and three bordars lived in Osleset.

=== Spa ===
Ossett was, for a brief period in the 19th century, a spa town, having been founded by a local stonemason who was inspired by Harrogate and Cheltenham. The waters were popular with those seeking relief from certain skin diseases in the early 19th century, but it remained a small spa during this period. In the 1870s, a plan to transform Ossett into a "second Harrogate" ended in failure, and the spa closed as a result. The south-east of the town is still known as "Ossett Spa".

=== Industrial Revolution ===
Coal-mining was, up to the late 1960s, Ossett's second industry in terms of people employed and the first in terms of males employed. Coal has been mined since the 14th century and there were a large number of pits in Ossett during the 19th century. The pits included Old Roundwood, opened in 1851 mining the Gawthorpe seam. The Haigh Moor seam opened in 1860 and the Silkstone seam opened in 1893. Pildacre pit shut due to flooding in 1875 but remained as a source of water for Ossett. Westfield shut in the early 1900s. The Chidswell riot in 1893 was caused by striking miners trying to reach Westfield to stop other miners working. Another pit down Healey Road was also the scene of tension between police and striking miners. Low Laithes pit shut in 1926, however the seams later flooded and were responsible for the Lofthouse Colliery disaster in 1973. Greatfield shut in the 1950s, Old Roundwood shut in 1966 and Shaw Cross, on the Ossett/Dewsbury border near the current Dewsbury Rugby League stadium, closed in 1968.

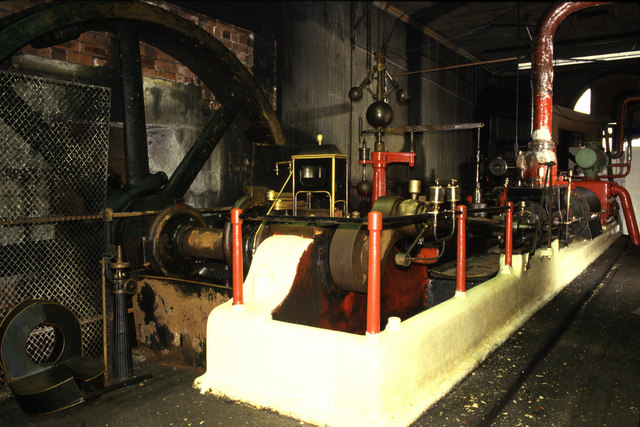
The steam engine at Runtlings Mill in 1987.

Author and local resident Stan Barstow said that Ossett and Horbury were the "border country" where the north-west of the coalfield merged with the south-east of the wool towns. Local historian John Goodchild said, "The place was essentially one of small mines and small mills". The town was once a thriving centre of the "shoddy" industry; recycling woollen garments. Whilst some mill towns employed mostly females in its textile sector, Ossett's mills always had roughly equal numbers of men and women. The town's mills were generally small, but they had a reputation as high-quality producers. Whitehead's Mill used to have a carnival float that said "We Export to the World" at the Gawthorpe May Pole parade.

During the 1970s, Woodhead Manufacturing employed 1,500 people on this site in its two premises fronting Church Street and Kingsway. The shock absorber business was the last part of the site operations to close in the early 1990s. The site is now a housing estate and Woodhead's exists in name only and is run from an industrial estate in Leeds. There is however, a large old 'mill type' building situated on Church Street, which, prior to its refurbishment, had shown Woodhead signage in large blue lettering on the buildings' facade. The building was for many years left in a very derelict and dangerous state, largely due to vandalism. Arson in particular inflicted significant damage, leaving the buildings' roof black and charred. Building work was attempted many times until the building was eventually renovated and converted into flats in 2016. The yard and building has a large stone wall and locked iron gates to the front, which edges right up to the pavement on Church Street, and high metal fencing to the rear, which edges up to a grassed area next to the large housing estate. The housing estate situated at the rear, is fairly large and has a selection of mixed style and sized modern houses and four-storey flats, occupied by singletons, couples and families.

=== Second World War ===
In the Second World War, Ossett was accidentally bombed on 16 September 1940. Ten High Explosive bombs were dropped. No one was killed, but a number of chickens and several properties were damaged. Later in the war a V-1's engine was reportedly heard to cut out, and came down at Grange Moor, to the west of the town.

== Governance ==
Although not granted by the College of Arms, this icon was adopted for the former Municipal Borough of Ossett.

Ossett cum Gawthorpe was a township in the ancient parish of Dewsbury; it became a civil parish in 1866, and was incorporated as the Municipal Borough of Ossett in 1890. Under the Local Government Act 1972, it became an unparished area in the City of Wakefield. In an earlier draft of the Act, Ossett was to be part of the Kirklees district on the grounds that the area was originally part of the parish of Dewsbury; after an appeal by the Ossett Labour Party, it was decided Ossett would be part of the Wakefield district.

Ossett has changed its parliamentary constituency several times. Since the 2024 election, Ossett has been part of the Ossett and Denby Dale constituency, which is currently represented in Parliament by Jade Botterill of the Labour Party. Between 2010 and 2024, it was part of the Wakefield constituency; the MPs during this period were Mary Creagh, Imran Ahmad Khan and Simon Lightwood.

In 1983, the town transferred from the Dewsbury seat to the Normanton constituency. When Ossett was part of the Dewsbury constituency, the MP was David Ginsburg, one of the Labour MPs who defected to the Social Democratic Party. On transferring to the Normanton constituency, the MP for many years was Bill O'Brien until he entered the House of Lords and was succeeded by Ed Balls.

Most of the town is in the Ossett ward on the local council, but the south-eastern part of the town is in the Horbury and South Ossett ward. The Ossett ward is extremely marginal, and has been won in the 21st century by Labour, Liberal Democrat, Conservative and UKIP candidates at different times. As of 3 September 2024, the ward is represented by one Conservative councillor and two Labour councillors, whereas Horbury and South Ossett is represented by three Labour councillors.

== Geography ==
=== Localities ===
South Ossett constitutes the southern part of the town. The northern part is known as 'Ossett and Gawthorpe'.

South Ossett is just north of Horbury with its main road being Storrs Hill Road. Much of the new building growth in Ossett has been concentrated in the South Ossett area. The area is close to countryside and is part of the Wakefield constituency and "Horbury and South Ossett" ward for elections.

=== Climate ===
Ossett experiences an oceanic climate (Köppen climate classification Cfb) similar to almost all of the United Kingdom.

Climate data for Ossett, West Yorkshire 1981–2010
| Month | Jan | Feb | Mar | Apr | May | Jun | Jul | Aug | Sep | Oct | Nov | Dec | Year |
|---|---|---|---|---|---|---|---|---|---|---|---|---|---|
| Mean daily maximum °C (°F) | 6 (43) | 6.2 (43.2) | 8.8 (47.8) | 11.6 (52.9) | 15.3 (59.5) | 18.1 (64.6) | 20.1 (68.2) | 19.1 (66.4) | 17 (63) | 12.9 (55.2) | 8.7 (47.7) | 6.1 (43.0) | 12.5 (54.5) |
| Mean daily minimum °C (°F) | 0.8 (33.4) | 0.5 (32.9) | 2.3 (36.1) | 3.7 (38.7) | 6.1 (43.0) | 8.7 (47.7) | 10.9 (51.6) | 10.9 (51.6) | 9.1 (48.4) | 6.4 (43.5) | 3.3 (37.9) | 1 (34) | 5.3 (41.6) |
| Average precipitation mm (inches) | 111.5 (4.39) | 70.3 (2.77) | 82.2 (3.24) | 76.9 (3.03) | 62.4 (2.46) | 78.2 (3.08) | 63.7 (2.51) | 81.4 (3.20) | 75.8 (2.98) | 107.7 (4.24) | 104.5 (4.11) | 114 (4.5) | 1,028.6 (40.51) |
| Average rainy days | 15.7 | 13.2 | 13.7 | 10.9 | 10.9 | 11.5 | 10.1 | 11.9 | 11.4 | 14.1 | 15.8 | 15.2 | 154.4 |
| Mean monthly sunshine hours | 51.5 | 64.8 | 96 | 134.2 | 167.1 | 153.5 | 172.5 | 161 | 126.6 | 101.3 | 57.8 | 50.2 | 1,336.5 |
Source: Met Office

== Demography ==
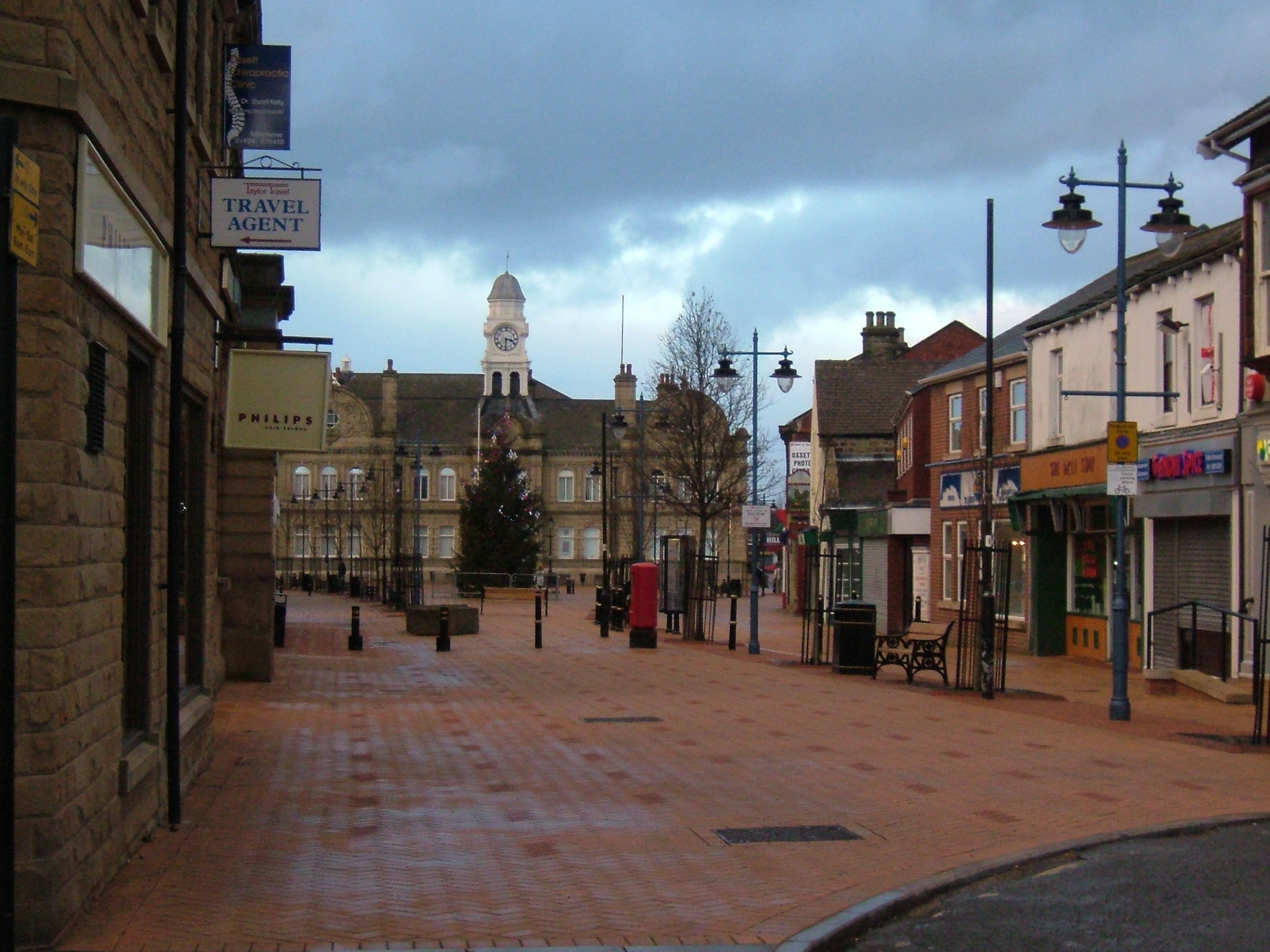
Ossett town centre, showing the town hall building

At the 2021 Census, the population was 21,861. Ossett's convenient proximity to the M1 motorway has led the old industrial town to become more affluent in recent years, attracting both industry and resident commuters to Leeds. This leaves Ossett with higher priced housing compared to nearby areas.

== Economy ==
There are four operational textile mills in the town: Ings Mill, on Dale Street, deals in recycled textiles; Burmatex Ltd, based at Victoria Mills on the Green produce carpet tiles; Edward Clay & Son Ltd, Wesley Street, manufactures felts for the mattress making and horticultural industries and Wilson Briggs & Son by the River Calder off Healey Road deals with textile mill waste and remnant processing. Other have been converted into units, some of the most prominent being Royd's Mill on the Leeds Road roundabout and the large congregation of mills in the Healey area. Some mills remain derelict.

Ossett is home to two real ale breweries. Ossett Brewery, located in Healey, and Bob's Brewing Company, formerly the Red Lion Brewery.

== Landmarks ==
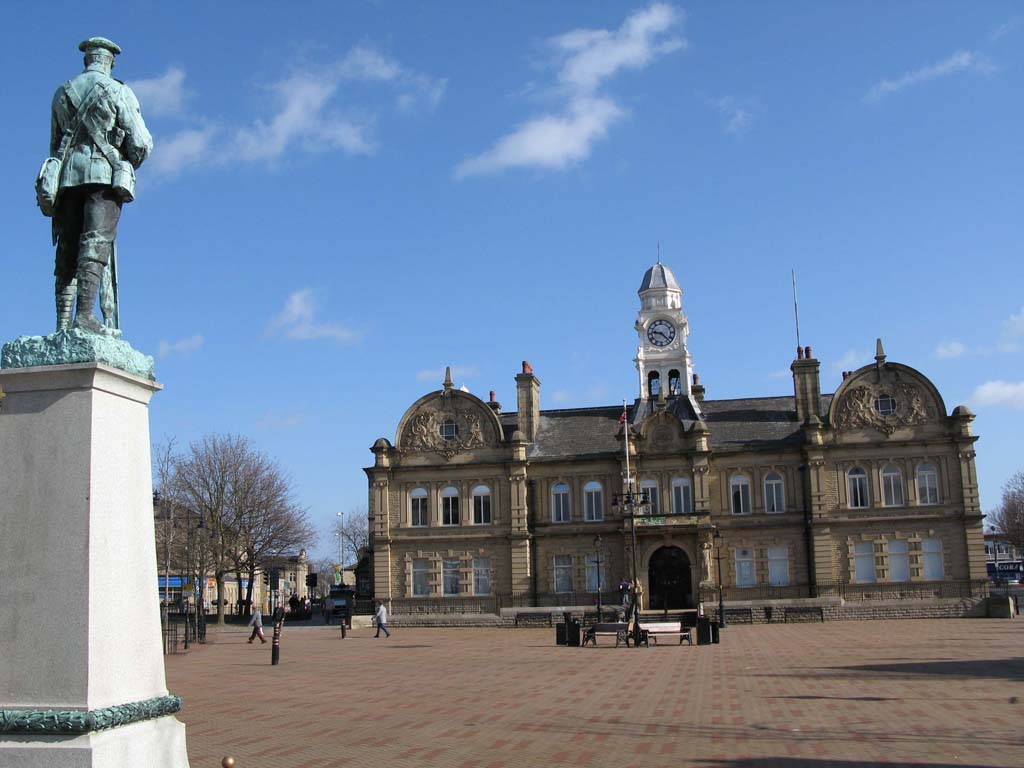
Ossett Town Hall Square

Trinity Church was consecrated in 1865 and its spire, which rises to 226 feet, is a landmark that can be seen for miles around. A red phone booth in Ossett town centre, opposite the Kingsway roundabout, is a grade II listed building.

Ossett Town Hall celebrated its centenary in June 2008. Gawthorpe, an area of north Ossett, is known for its landmark water tower.

== Transport ==
The Romans constructed a road from Halifax to Wakefield, and this road became a turnpike road in 1741. Its route roughly corresponds to the modern day Dewsbury Road. Streetside Post Office is a reminder of the Roman origins of the road. The M1 motorway between Junctions 40 and 42 to the east of Ossett was opened in April 1967. The stretch from junction 38 to 40 was opened in October 1968. The Highways Agency have plans to widen the M1 to 4 lanes between Chesterfield and Leeds. In 2005 a bus station was opened in the town built by West Yorkshire Metro replacing an earlier bus station constructed in the 1970s.

The railways arrived in Ossett in 1862 when the Bradford, Wakefield & Leeds Railway company opened a branch line to Flushdyke. The line was extended to Ossett in 1864 and then onto Dewsbury and Batley. Ossett railway station, located roughly where Southdale Gardens now is, was opened in 1889 by the Great Northern Railway. The line ran underneath Station Road and the bump in the road today is the only reminder of the bridge that used to exist there until its removal in the 1980s. The railway station closed in 1964. The town was close to four other railway stations: Chickenley Heath closed in 1911, Earlsheaton in 1953, Flushdyke closed in 1941 and Horbury & Ossett in 1970. It is now the largest town in Yorkshire and one of the largest towns in Britain without a railway station. Railway sidings and yards are still to be found at the old Horbury & Ossett railway station site and Healey Mills Marshalling Yard where Queen Elizabeth II spent a night aboard the Royal Train during her 1977 Silver Jubilee tour.

In June 2009, the Association of Train Operating Companies proposed Ossett, as one of seven English towns with a strong business case for the location of a new railway station. It is likely that an unstaffed station would be erected at Healey Mills.

Ossett bus station is situated in the town centre next to Prospect Road (B6128) and Ossett United's football ground. The bus station is managed and owned by West Yorkshire Metro, and was rebuilt in 2005; it has six stands and a real-time information board. The main operator at the bus station is Arriva Yorkshire. Buses run around the town and regularly to Wakefield and Dewsbury, and less frequently to Batley.

== Education ==
Until the late 1960s, Ossett had its own Grammar School. Founded in 1735 it grew out of the activity of the National Society for Promoting Education of the Poor, and its local committee formed in 1727. When sufficient funds had been raised, a small classroom was erected on waste land facing the chapel-of-ease in Ossett. The area given to the school increased throughout the 18th and 19th centuries, and the education it offered was initially largely linked with the church. In 1904, the old Grammar School had to move from the centre of Ossett, to make way for the construction of the new Town Hall. Temporary location was found in the Central Baptist schoolroom in old Church Street. Changes agreed included a decision that the School should have mixed-sex classes, the first of its kind in the West Riding of Yorkshire. In 1905/6 Ossett Corporation purchased Park House, built in 1867, off Storrs Hill for £2,500. This house, with its three acres of land became the new Ossett Grammar School in September 1906, with 95 pupils and a staff of 8. For the next 63 years the school underwent substantial building expansions, and growth in numbers. Enrolment was via success in the 11+ examination, and many pupils were educated to university entrance level. It ceased to be a grammar school in 1969 and became a Comprehensive School. Ossett now has nine primary schools; Gawthorpe Community Academy, Ossett Flushdyke School, Towngate Primary Academy; Ossett Holy Trinity C of E Primary School, St Ignatius Catholic Primary School, Ossett South Parade Primary, South Ossett Infant Academy, Ossett Southdale C of E Junior School and Dimplewell Infants School and Nursery. Ossett has one mainstream secondary school, Ossett Academy & Sixth Form College, on the site of the previous Ossett Grammar School, and also has The Grange School, which is an independent special school and Highfield School which caters for children aged 11 to 16 who have learning disabilities, using the buildings of the old North Ossett High School which closed in 1997.

== Religion ==
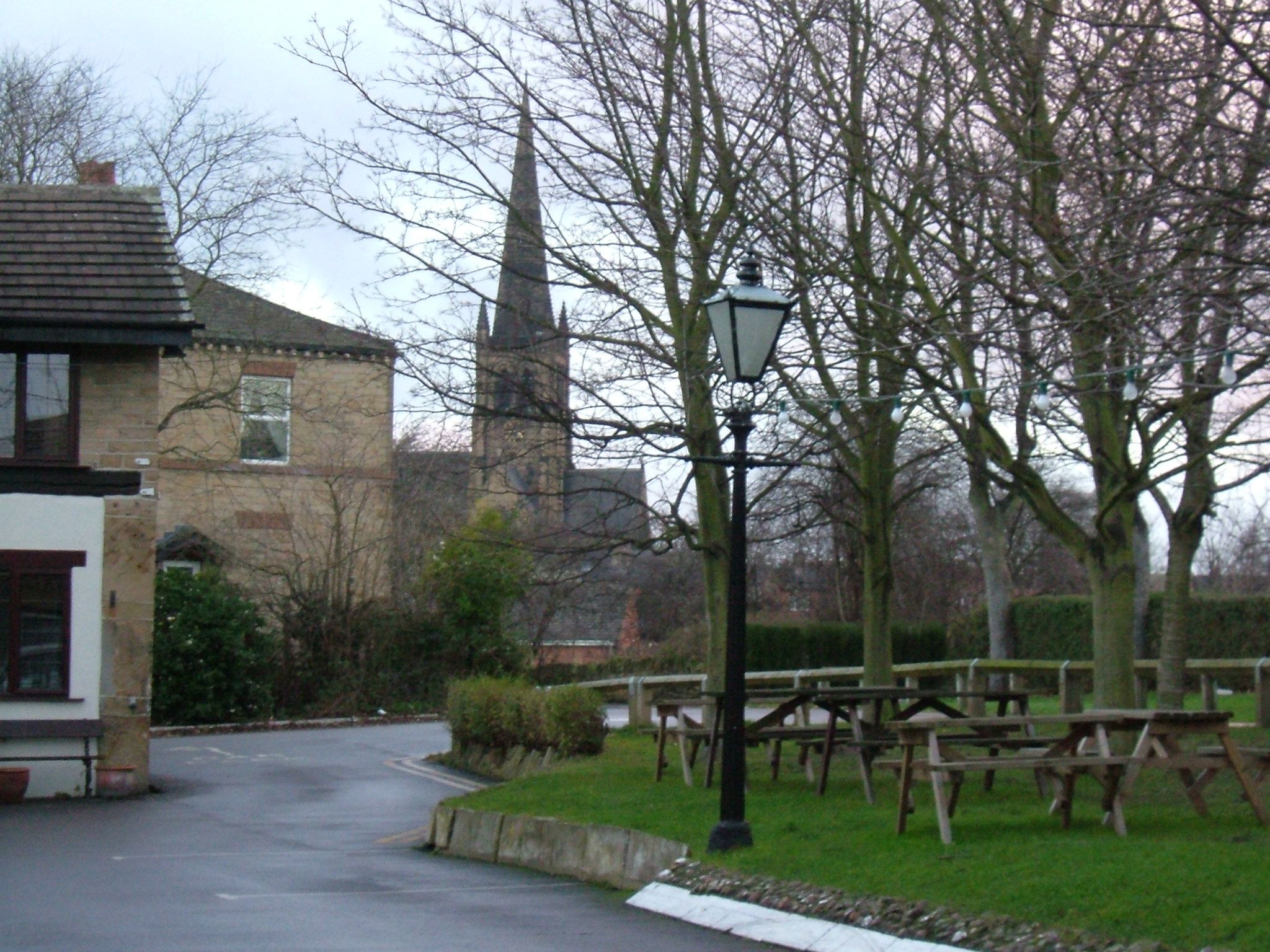
Holy Trinity Church, Ossett, viewed from Dale Street

There are seven churches in the town, each with their own particular identities and initiatives. Many of the leaders of these churches meet regularly to collaborate and support each other. In the 18th and 19th centuries, the town had a reputation as a centre of religious Nonconformism. Although Nonconformist churches were common all over West Yorkshire, Ossett was a particular hotbed. In 1890, seventeen different churches were recorded in Ossett, excluding "spiritualist churches". Trinity Church is one of the two Anglican churches in the town. The other is Christ Church, South Ossett. St Mary's Church on Dewsbury Road closed in 2002, and its parish was divided between Dewsbury (Chickenley) and Ossett and Gawthorpe (Gawthorpe).

St. Ignatius Roman Catholic Church was built in 1878. The Salvation Army is the only church in Gawthorpe. The Salvation Army building also acts as a community centre providing dinners for senior citizens and two parent and toddler groups. There is also a Kingdom Hall of Jehovah's Witnesses on Ventnor Way, and a spiritualist church in the town centre. The King's Way church on Ventnor Way is a Methodist and United Reformed church.

== Sport ==
Ossett Rugby are based at Ossett Cricket and Athletic Club and play at Southdale playing fields with two men's and one senior ladies team. Recently the club have offered Junior rugby with mini rugby for ages 2 and up, mixed age grades at under 9's and under 12's plus girls only teams to extend the rugby offering in the town to all ages.

Ossett Trinity, the local rugby league club, resigned from the Rugby League Conference in 2006. Ossett Cricket Club also play at Dimplewells. The Heavy Woollen District has its own cricket association and its own cricket team. Residents of Ossett are eligible to play for the Heavy Woollen District team.

Ossett hosted two semi-professional football teams, both played in the Northern Premier League Division One North: Ossett Town played at Ingfield, and neighbours Ossett Albion played at Queen's Terrace, more commonly known as Dimplewells. In February 2018, the two clubs announced an agreement to merge under the name Ossett United.

There was an Ossett Football Club in the 1890s, they played in the original West Yorkshire League, but the oldest current club in Ossett is Ossett Common Rovers, formed in 1910 and currently playing in the modern West Yorkshire League. Other clubs in Ossett include Ossett Wanderers, Ossett United and Ossett Panthers. Little Bull F.C., Ossett Two Brewers and AFC Two Brewers play in the Wakefield & District League.

The Yorkshire and the Humber branch of the Disability Sports Federation has its headquarters on the Longlands Industrial Estate in the town.

== Culture and media ==
Local news and television programmes are provided by BBC Yorkshire and ITV Yorkshire. Television signals are received from the Emley Moor TV transmitter.

Local radio stations are BBC Radio Leeds, Heart Yorkshire, Capital Yorkshire, Hits Radio West Yorkshire, Greatest Hits Radio Yorkshire, and Rhubarb Radio, a community based station.

The Wakefield Express and the Dewsbury Reporter report local news. The Wakefield Express publishes an Ossett Edition, and also contains an Ossett and district section. Ossett has a free magazine The Ossett Review established in July 2005. The Ossett Civic Trust produce a quarterly newsletter Ossett Times. The Horbury Ossett Community News, which is a free local weekly paper printed and distributed throughout the town and Horbury.

Gawthorpe hosts the annual World Coal-Carrying Championships (Easter Monday) and an annual Maypole parade in May. Ossett Beercart takes place on the first weekend of June. Ossett Gala takes place in July. The turning on of the Christmas lights is another focal point for the community, along with the fire station's bonfire on the Friday evening nearest to 5 November. The Ossett Beer Festival takes place annually at the Brewers' Pride pub, Healey Road, Ossett over the August bank holiday weekend.

- The town is mentioned in the song It's Grim Up North by The KLF.
- Ossett was defined as "wheeare the' black-leead t'tram lines" in both A Yorkshireman's Dictionary by Peter Wright and The Yorkshire Dictionary by Arnold Kellett, although neither book gives any explanation for this. One interpretation is that it was mocking the town's heavy pollution when it was industrialised. Another is that Ossett people were seen as fussy and pedantic.
- From Austin Mitchell's Talkin' Yorkshire (page 48):

In moments of extreme anger Ossett fish-puddlers have been known to resent "thou" and reply "Don't thee thou me thee thou thissen and see how tha likes thee thouing" but this is rare.

- Ossett is the home of Wakefield Orchestral Wind (WOW), an orchestral wind band with a varied repertoire including popular film music, show music, big band, classical and their conductor's own arrangements. The band plays regularly at local events, such as Ossett Gala, Horbury Show and Camphill Pennine Community Summer Fair.
- Software house Team17 was previously based there, and their most famous game – "Worms" – contained a Hell level with a sign saying, "Welcome to Ossett". In the sequel Worms 2, there is the cheat code 'OSSETT', which enables the levels from the first game.
- Ossett is defined in the "Meaning of liff" as "a frilly spare-toilet-roll-cosy".

== Notable people ==
- The astronomer Cyril Jackson (1903–1988), who moved to South Africa, was born in Ossett, and honoured the town when he named the asteroid 1244 Deira; the citation he submitted to the IAU boils down to "Ancient name of Ossett, Yorkshire". This is something of an exaggeration, as the Anglian Kingdom of Deira encompassed (at its height) most of Yorkshire.
- Benjamin Ingham (1712–1772), founder of the Inghamite Methodists was born in Ossett. He was educated at Batley Grammar School and Queen's College, Oxford. He was ordained in 1735 and accompanied John and Charles Wesley as a missionary to the colony of Georgia in the USA. In 1737, after his return to Ossett, Ingham started to establish the Inghamite Methodists after being banned in 1739 from preaching in churches. By 1755 there were over eighty Inghamite congregations, mainly in Yorkshire and Lancashire. A vestige of Ingham's Church still survives in the Lancashire/Yorkshire border area.
- Eli Marsden Wilson, (1877–1965) was a successful Ossett-born artist who had seventeen pictures exhibited at the Royal Academy. After studying at Wakefield College of Art, he moved to the Royal College of Art in London where he became a pupil of Sir Frank Short. The first picture Wilson exhibited at the R.A. in 1905 was an etching of Ossett Market as it was in Victorian times. There is a copy of "Ossett Market" by E. M. Wilson on display in Wakefield Art Gallery.
- Thomas Cussons (chemist) first established the Cussons personal care brand in Ossett. The initials of Thomas' eldest son John W. Cussons (1867–1922) can still be found on the wall of the original building, until recently the Yorkshire Bank on Station Road. Thomas's youngest son Alex T. Cussons (1875–1951), who was apprenticed in Ossett, went on to manufacture the famous Cussons Imperial Leather soap.
- Michael Taylor, born c.1944, who became notable in 1974 as a result of an Ossett murder case.
- Sir Edward Luckhoo, Governor General of Guyana, lived in Ossett in retirement, and is buried in the town.

=== Writers ===
- Novelist Stan Barstow (1928–2011), the author of A Kind of Loving, and twelve other novels was born in Horbury, yet lived much of his life in Ossett and attended Ossett Grammar School during the Second World War. A Kind of Loving was turned into a film, a radio play, a stage play and a television series. In his later life he lived in South Wales
- The crime novelist David Peace (b. 1967), originates from Ossett and set the first six of his books in the West Riding.
- Elaine Storkey, (née Lively): (b.1944), broadcaster, writer and academic, was brought up in Ossett and wrote for the Ossett Observer as a child. She was Head Girl of Ossett Grammar School in 1962, studied in Aberystwyth, became lecturer at Oxford and London Universities and was celebrated in 2019 in the US for her book Scars Across Humanity: Understanding and overcoming violence against women.
- Mabel Ferrett, poet, publisher, literary editor and local historian, was born in Ossett

=== Actors and musicians ===
- Robert Brydges Addison (1854–1920), composer and choirmaster, lived in Ossett with his father
- Black Lace, British pop group, notable for their 1984 single "Agadoo".
- Jill Summers (actress, known for playing Phyllis Pearce in Coronation Street), lived in the town.
- Helen Worth (actress, known for playing Gail Platt in Coronation Street) was born and brought up in Ossett.

=== Sportspeople ===
- Richard Wood, defender with Sheffield Wednesday F.C.
- Barry Wood, former Yorkshire, Lancashire and England cricketer, was born and brought up in Ossett.
- David Raw, cricketer

== See also ==
- Listed buildings in Ossett
- Listed buildings in Horbury and South Ossett
