= Mabel Ferrett =

British poet, publisher and local historian

- Born: Mabel Frankland; 30 April 1917; Ossett, West Riding of Yorkshire
- Died: 28 January 2011 (aged 93)
- Occupations: Poet, publisher, literary editor and local historian
- Organization: The Pennine Poets
- Spouse: Harold Ferrett
- Children: one

Mabel Ferrett (1917-2011) was a British poet, publisher, literary editor and local historian. She was one of the founders of the long-established Pennine Poets writing group. She established the Fighting Cock Press to publish work by northern authors.

== Personal life ==
She was born Mabel Frankland in Ossett, West Riding of Yorkshire. She attended Ossett Grammar School and became a teacher. She married in 1947 and thereafter lived in Heckmondwike, also in West Yorkshire. Ferrett died in 2011 aged 93.

== Career ==
Ferrett started the Pennine Poets writing group in 1966 in Elland, West Yorkshire. She founded the Fighting Cock Press in 1973. She edited the journal of the Pennine Poets, Pennine Platform, between 1973 and 1976, and Orbis poetry magazine between 1978 and 1980.

Her poetry won awards including the Julia Cairns award for poetry from the Society of Women Writers and Journalists. Her poetry was often on historical themes. She also wrote for local magazines and newspapers, including The Yorkshire Post. Her historical novel about Chartism in the Spen Valley was dramatised on BBC Radio 4.

Ferrett worked at the Red House Museum in Gomersal and also as a teacher. During the war she taught under challenging conditions at Armley National School in Leeds.

She was a founder member of the Spen Valley Historical Society. She was particularly known for her work on the Brontës and their circle.

== Bibliography ==
- The Lynx-Eyed Strangers (1956) (poetry)
- The Angry Men (1965) (historical novel)
- The Tall Tower (1970) (poetry)
- The Years of the Right Hand (1975) (poetry)
- Shirley Country (1973), republished as The Brontës in the Spen Valley (1978) (non-fiction)
- The Humber Bridge: selected poems 1955-1985 (1986)
- The Taylors of the Red House (1987)
- "Shirley by Charlotte Brontë: The Importance of Proper Names," Transactions of the Yorkshire Dialect Society (1988)
- A Short History of Hartshead (1993) (non-fiction)
- Scathed Earth: selected poems (1996)
- Imaginary Gates (2001) (poetry)
- After Passchendaele: A Writer’s War (2003) (autobiography)
- Spirit and Emotion (2006) (non-fiction)
