= Ossett Town Hall =

Municipal building in Ossett, West Yorkshire, England

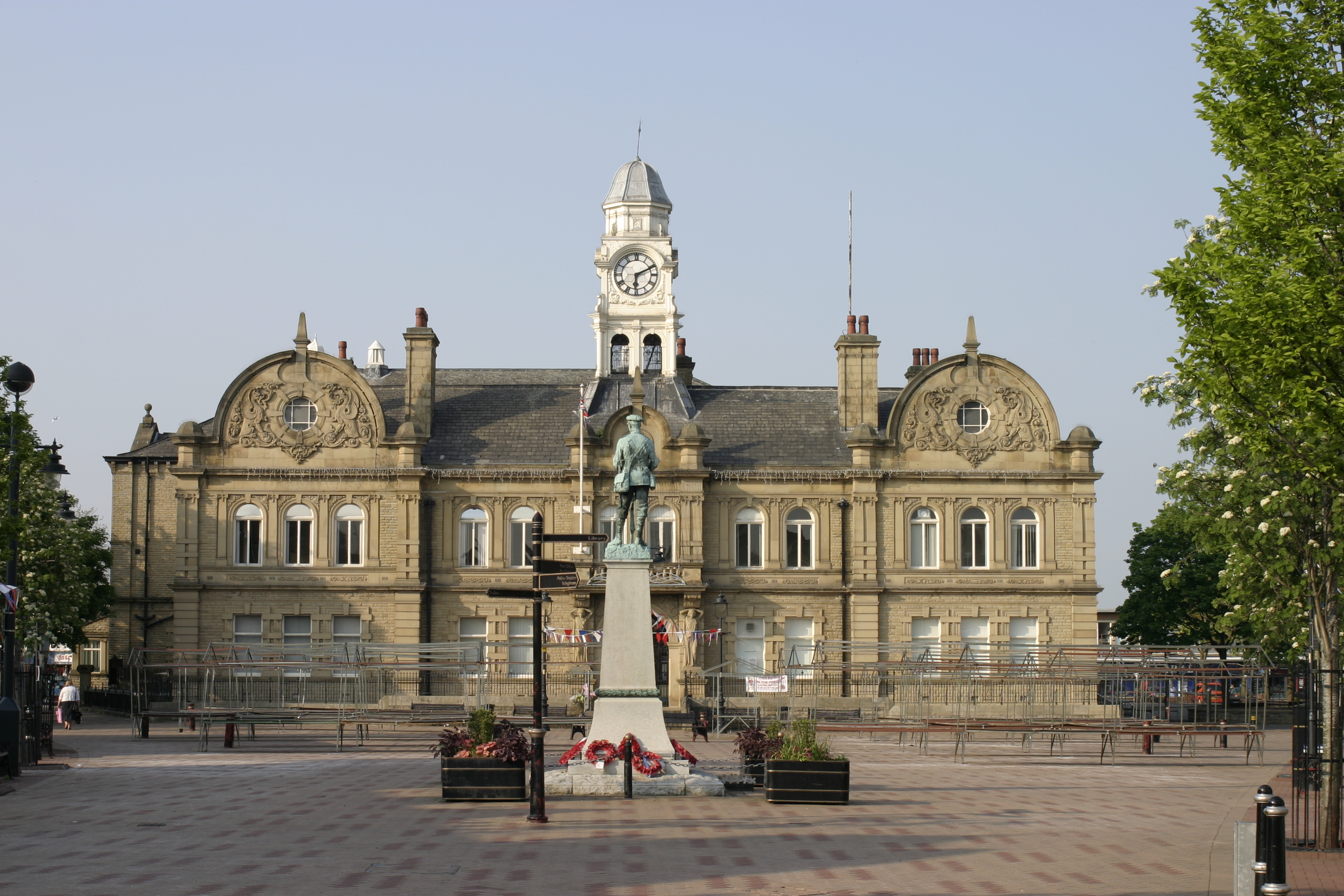
- Ossett Town Hall

- Shown in West Yorkshire
- 53.6800°N 1.5793°W
- Location: Market Place, Ossett

History
- Built: 1908

Site notes
- Architect(s): Walter Hanstock & Son
- Architectural style: Renaissance style

Listed Building – Grade II
- Official name: Town Hall
- Designated: 6 May 1988
- Reference no.: 1184149

Ossett Town Hall is a municipal building in the Market Place, Ossett, West Yorkshire, England. The town hall, which was the headquarters of Ossett Borough Council until 1974, is a grade II listed building.

== History ==
After significant population growth in the second half of the 19th century, particularly associated with coal mining, the area became a municipal borough in 1890 and civic leaders, who had been operating out of rented premises in New Street, decided to procure a dedicated town hall for the area. The site they initially selected at the corner of Bank Street and Illingworth Street was found to be unsuitable and instead they decided to make use of a site in the Market Place which had been occupied by the local grammar school before it moved to Park House, off Storrs Hill Road.

The foundation stone for the new building was laid by the mayor, Alderman John Hampshire Nettleton, on 27 February 1906. It was designed by Walter Hanstock & Son of Batley in the renaissance style, built at a cost of £22,000, which was financed by public subscription, and officially opened by the mayor, Councillor John Thomas Marsden, on 2 June 1908. The design involved a symmetrical main frontage with twelve bays facing onto the Market Place with the end three bays at each end slightly projected forward and topped with ornately carved pediments containing oculi. The central section of two bays, which also slightly projected forward, featured a round headed doorway flanked by caryatids supporting brackets carrying a stone balcony; there were round headed windows on the first floor flanked by Ionic order pilasters with a pediment above containing a roundel depicting local industries. At roof level was a two-stage clock tower with cupola and dome, containing a large Cambridge-chiming turret clock by William Potts & Sons and a set of five bells by Taylor of Loughborough. Internally, the principal rooms were the council chamber and the public hall, which featured a large gallery.

King George V and Queen Mary visited Ossett Market Place and talked to civic leaders outside the town hall in July 1912 and the young men of Ossett were called up at the town hall and billeted there during the First World War. A war memorial in the form of a soldier with a rifle was installed outside the town hall in 1920. The professional snooker and billiards player, Joe Davis, took part in a series of exhibition matches at the town hall in December 1948 to raise funds for local charities.

An organ, which had originally been designed and manufactured by John Compton for the Rialto Cinema in Bebington in Cheshire in 1933, was recovered from the cinema on its closure and installed in the public hall in January 1970. The opening concert was broadcast on the programme, The Organist Entertains, on BBC Radio 2. The building served as the headquarters of Ossett Borough Council for much of the 20th century but ceased to be the local seat of government when the enlarged Wakefield District Council was formed in 1974. A major programme of refurbishment works costing £2 million commenced at the town hall in March 2020.

== See also ==
- Listed buildings in Ossett
