= David Raw =

English cricketer (born 1944)

Personal information
- Full name: George David Raw
- Born: 14 November 1944 (age 81); Ossett, Yorkshire, England
- Batting: Right-handed

Domestic team information
- Years: Team
- 1967–1968: Cambridge University
- 1968: Cambridgeshire

Career statistics
Competition	First-class
Matches	6
Runs scored	82
Batting average	8.20
100s/50s	–/–
Top score	21
Catches/stumpings	–/–
- Source: Cricinfo, 19 July 2019

George David Raw (born 14 November 1944) is an English former first-class cricketer.

Raw was born at Ossett in November 1944. He studied at St Catharine's College, Cambridge. While studying at Cambridge, he made his debut in first-class cricket for Cambridge University against Sussex at Fenner's in 1967. He made five further first-class appearances for Cambridge, the last of which coming in 1968 against Leicestershire. He scored 82 runs in his six matches, at an average of 8.20 and a high score of 21. In addition to playing first-class cricket, he also played minor counties cricket for Cambridgeshire in 1968, making eight appearances in the Minor Counties Championship.
