= Stan Barstow =

English writer (1928–2011)

Stan Barstow FRSL
- Born: Stanley Barstow; 28 June 1928; Horbury, West Riding of Yorkshire, England
- Died: 1 August 2011 (aged 83); Baglan, Neath Port Talbot, West Glamorgan, Wales
- Education: Ossett Grammar School; Open University
- Occupations: Novelist, playwright and scriptwriter
- Spouse: Constance Kershaw (m. 1951, separated 1990)
- Partner: Diana Griffiths (1990–2011)
- Children: 2
- Writing career
- Literary movement: Social realism

Stanley Barstow FRSL (28 June 1928 – 1 August 2011) was an English novelist.

== Biography ==
Barstow was born in Horbury, near Wakefield in the West Riding of Yorkshire. His father was a coal miner and he attended Ossett Grammar School. He worked as a draughtsman and salesman for an engineering company. He was best known for his 1960 novel A Kind of Loving, which has been turned into a film, a television series, a radio play and a stage play. The author's other novels included Ask Me Tomorrow (1962), The Watchers on the Shore (1966) and The Right True End (1976). He frequently attended public events in Ossett, where he grew up, and Horbury, his birthplace.

Barstow's other works included Joby, which was turned into a television play starring Patrick Stewart, A Raging Calm, A Season with Eros, A Brother’s Tale, Just You Wait and See, Modern Delights and an autobiography, In My Own Good Time (2001). He also wrote plays and short stories. He was elected a Fellow of the Royal Society of Literature (FRSL) in 1999.

Barstow married Connie Kershaw in 1951, and they had two children. In the late 1980s, he met Diana Griffiths who was beginning to learn her trade as a writer with Barstow's help. He and Connie Kershaw separated in 1990, though never divorced. Stan started a new life with Griffiths, now a writer in her own right, with eight original plays and nearly twenty dramatisations to her credit. Later he lived in Pontardawe, South Wales, with her. Stan Barstow died on 1 August 2011, aged 83.

The Stan Barstow Memorial Garden in Horbury is named after him.

== Adaptations ==
His first novel, A Kind of Loving, has been adapted several times, starting with a 1962 film directed by John Schlesinger, which starred Alan Bates and June Ritchie. Barstow then adapted the novel for radio in 1964, followed by radio adaptations of the second book in the trilogy, The Watchers on the Shore, in 1966, and third, The Right True End in 1978. In 1978 he adapted all three books for a 10-part television series, titled A Kind of Loving, starring Clive Wood, Joanne Whalley and Susan Penhaligon.

In 1964, his short story The Human Element was filmed as an episode of Love Story.

Barstow adapted his 1968 novel, A Raging Calm, into a 7-part mini-series in 1974, starring Michael Williams, Alan Badel and Diana Coupland.

He adapted his 1964 novel Joby as 2-part television min-series in 1975. Directed by James Ormerod, it starred Patrick Stewart, Joanne Whalley, Richard Tolan and Lorraine Peters.

He created and wrote all episodes for the 1977 anthology series, The Cost of Loving. Directed by James Ormerod and David Reynolds, episodes featured actors such as Patricia Routledge, Jeff Rawle, Paula Wilcox, Jack Watson, Robert Brown and Anna Cropper.

In 1983 he adapted his 1980 novel, A Brother's Tale, as a 3-part television mini-series. Directed by Les Chatfield, it starred Trevor Eve and Kevin McNally.

== Filmography ==
This table does not include adaptations of Barstow's published stories. For those, see #Adaptations, above.

Year	Title	Notes
1965	Z Cars	Season 4, episode 19 - "The Luck of the Game"
1966	Armchair Theatre	Season 6, episode 7 - "The Pity of It All"
1970	A Family At War	Season 1, episode 3 - "Line of Battle"
1975	South Riding	All 13 episodes, based on novel by Winifred Holtby
1978	Premiere (UK TV series)	Season 2, episode 4 - "Travellers"
1993	The Man Who Cried	Television movie, based on novel by Catherine Cookson
2006	Calon Gaeth	Co-written with Diana Griffiths, based on novel by Siân James

== Bibliography ==
Novels

- A Kind of Loving (1960)
- Ask Me Tomorrow (1962)
- Joby (1964)
- The Watchers on the Shore (1966)
- A Raging Calm (1968)
- Through the Green Woods (1968)
- The Right True End (1976)
- A Brother's Tale (1980)
- Just You Wait and See (1986)
- B-Movie (1987)
- Give Us This Day (1989)
- Next of Kin (1991)

Short Story Collections

- The Desperados and Other Stories (1961)
- The Human Element and Other Stories (1969)
- A Season with Eros (1971)
- A Casual Acquaintance and Other Stories (1976)
- The Glad Eye and Other Stories (1984)
- The Likes of Us: Stories of Five Decades (2013)

Plays

- Stringer's Last Stand (1972) (with Alfred Bradley)
- Joby: a Television Play (1977)
- 'We Could Always Fit a Sidecar' in Out of the Air: Five Plays for Radio (1978)
- The Human Element, and Albert's Part: Two Television Plays (1984)

Autobiography

- In My Own Good Time (2001)
