= Shirley Nolan =

Founded the world's first bone marrow donor register (1942–2002)

- copyright Vic Grimmett (fair use)
- Born: Shirley Oakey; 10 February 1942; Cookridge, Yorkshire, England
- Died: 14 July 2002 (aged 60); Fairview Park, South Australia, Australia
- Occupation: Teacher
- Known for: The charity she founded made transplants possible for 4,000 people.

Shirley Nolan or Shirley Oakey (10 February 1942 – 14 July 2002) was a British teacher who set up the Anthony Nolan Register to allow Bone marrow transplants. Her son died and she was diagnosed with Parkinson disease taking her own life in 2002. The charity she founded made transplants possible for 4,000 people.

== Life ==
Nolan was born in Cookridge in 1942. Her father was a soldier at the time and her mother was a bus conductor. She attended Pontefract Girls' High School and went on to Trent Park College in Hertfordshire. She married James Gerald Nolan in 1962. She had studied at London's Guildhall School of Music and Drama and in 1963 she began teaching and in 1965 she was head of drama at a school in Rainham in Essex. In 1969 she travelled in Australia accompanied by a British man named as Albert Edward Vidler. They were living together in Adelaide when Anthony Nolan was born. Shirley was teaching literature and her partner had a delivery business.

In 1971 her son, Anthony Nolan, was born. He was quickly diagnosed with Wiskott–Aldrich syndrome, a rare inherited blood disorder.

In 1974 she founded the Anthony Nolan Register, based at the Westminster Children's Hospital.

Nolan was diagnosed with Parkinson's disease. The disease would not necessarily be fatal, but she was very ill with an increasingly poor quality of life. She criticised regulators who were not allowing stem cells to be used in research into a cure for Parkinson disease and she joined the Euthanasia Society.

== Death and legacy ==
Nolan died in July 2002 in Australia, aged 60, from an apparent suicide. She described her first attempt to take her life as "botched" and emergency medics created her recovery despite her written instructions. She was denied further painkillers but her friends knew that she intended to try again. Because they could not be implicated as accomplices, Shirley died alone using another cocktail of drugs.

The charity that she founded made transplants possible for 4,000 people. When she died there were 50 similar registers to her own, recording the bone marrow details of 7 million people.

The Anthony Nolan Register moved to St Mary Abbots Hospital in 1978 and to offices and research institute in north London, in the grounds of the Royal Free Hospital. The charity was renamed in 2001 as the Anthony Nolan Trust and again in 2010 to "Anthony Nolan".

In 2008 the "Anthony Nolan" charity created the UK's first cord blood bank, allowing mothers to donate the blood from their umbilical cord and placenta after they give birth, to use this blood in stem cell transplants.
