= Carleton, West Yorkshire =

Village in West Yorkshire, England

Coordinates: 53°40′34″N 1°17′38″W

Carleton
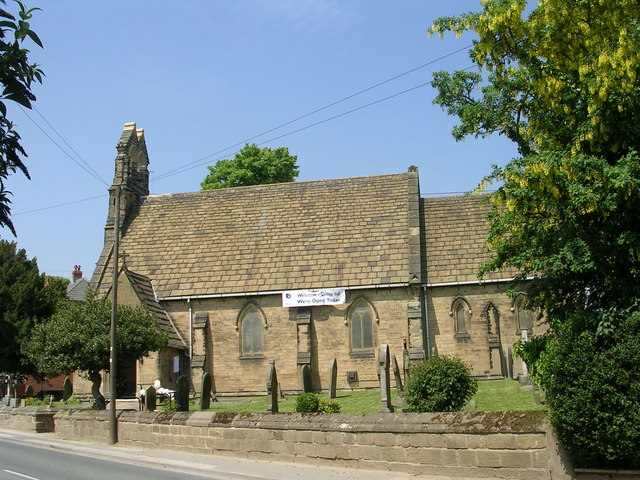
- St Michael the Archangel Church

- Location within West Yorkshire
- Metropolitan borough: Wakefield
- Metropolitan county: West Yorkshire
- Region: Yorkshire and the Humber
- Country: England
- Sovereign state: United Kingdom
- Police: West Yorkshire
- Fire: West Yorkshire
- Ambulance: Yorkshire

Carleton is a small village on the southern outskirts of Pontefract, in the Wakefield district, in the county of West Yorkshire, England. The village is home to the parish church of St Michael the Archangel, and two schools, Carleton High School and the Rookeries primary school. Pontefract RUFC is also based in the village.

Carleton was historically a township in the ancient parish of Pontefract in the West Riding of Yorkshire, in 1866 Carleton became a separate civil parish, on 1 April 1937 the parish was abolished and merged with Pontefract. In 1931 the parish had a population of 834.
