= John M. Goldman =

British physician (1938–2013)

- Born: 30 November 1938; London, England
- Died: 24 December 2013 (aged 75)
- Education: Magdalen College, Oxford
- Occupations: Haematologist; oncologist
- Known for: Development of new treatments for leukaemia; Pioneering work in bone marrow transplantation

John M. Goldman (30 November 1938 – 24 December 2013) was a British haematologist, oncologist and medical researcher. A specialist in chronic myeloid leukaemia, Goldman conducted pioneering research into leukaemia treatment – he was instrumental in the development of bone marrow transplantation as a clinical method, and later in the development of the drug imatinib. He was also a prolific author of scientific papers, was involved with numerous medical charities and had a decades-long surgical career at Hammersmith Hospital, London.

== Early life and education ==
Goldman was born in London in 1938 to Carl and Berthe Goldman, both Jewish refugees from Nazi Germany. Although he was briefly detained as an enemy alien, Carl Goldman served in the British Army during World War II, and established a successful medical practice in London; he later treated famous individuals such as Elizabeth Taylor and Rex Reed. John Goldman attended the Westminster School and performed in the school choir, but was barred from singing in Westminster Abbey, likely due to his Jewish background.

Goldman attended Magdalen College, Oxford, where he studied psychology and physiology despite originally applying to study classics. At one point during his Oxford years, Goldman and some friends drove across Eurasia to reach India; the Iranian authorities briefly arrested them during the journey, forcing Goldman's group to drug their guards with barbiturates to escape. After graduating from Oxford, Goldman trained in (and later taught) haematology and oncology at several medical schools and hospitals, including St. Bartholomew's Hospital, Harvard University, and the University of Miami.

== Medical career and leukaemia research ==
In 1971 Goldman joined the staff of Hammersmith Hospital, London, and became a specialist in the treatment of chronic myeloid leukaemia. During the 1980s, he conducted some of the first bone marrow transplants in Europe, and also developed precise molecular tests to detect residual leukaemia cells in the blood of patients. Goldman chaired the charity Leuka from its inception in 1982, launching a £10 million appeal to build the Catherine Lewis Centre, a specialist leukaemia centre, at Hammersmith Hospital; the centre opened in 2002. In 1988, Goldman became a member of the blood cancer charity and bone marrow transplant register Anthony Nolan. He worked as a trustee and medical director for Anthony Nolan for over 20 years, helping the charity to expand its reach and resources worldwide. He also helped establish the World Marrow Donor Association in 1990, and served (at various different times) as the president of the International Society for Experimental Haematology, the European Group for Blood and Marrow Transplantation, the European Haematology Association and several other medical and scientific organisations.

From the late 1990s onwards, Goldman was instrumental in promoting the use of the anti-cancer drug imatinib, working to refine and expand its clinical usage as a targeted therapy. He retired from Hammersmith Hospital in 2004, but continued to work as an advocate and benefactor of cancer research and treatment in the developing world. During his career, he published over 700 scientific papers, and was the editor of the journal Bone Marrow Transplantation from 1985 until his death in December 2013.

== Personal life ==
Goldman was married to Jeannine Fuller; after divorcing her, he lived with Constance Shaw. He was survived by his three children: a daughter from his marriage to Fuller, and a daughter and son from his relationship with Shaw. Goldman was an avid reader of history and classic literature, travelled extensively overseas, and was a passionate skier.
