= Kettlethorpe, West Yorkshire =

Suburb of Wakefield, England

Coordinates: 53.6440°N 1.5057°W

Kettlethorpe
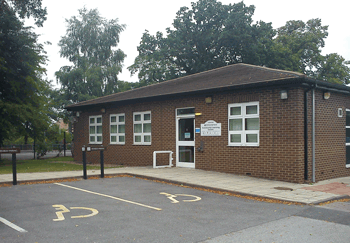
- Kettlethorpe High School Community Learning Centre

- Location within West Yorkshire
- Metropolitan borough: City of Wakefield
- Metropolitan county: West Yorkshire
- Region: Yorkshire and the Humber
- Country: England
- Sovereign state: United Kingdom
- Post town: WAKEFIELD
- Postcode district: WF2
- Dialling code: 01924
- Police: West Yorkshire
- Fire: West Yorkshire
- Ambulance: Yorkshire

Kettlethorpe, originally a separate village, is a suburb that lies 2.5 miles (4 km) south of Wakefield city centre, in West Yorkshire, England. The suburb has a secondary education school, Kettlethorpe High School, which is a specialist maths and computing college. It was deemed to be good by Ofsted in 2011 and again in 2016.

Kettlethorpe Hall was built in 1727 by the Pilkington family. It has been converted into two separate houses.
