= Watchmensch =

- Cover art for the 2009 comic Watchmensch, published by Brain Scan Studios. Artwork by Simon Rohrmüller

Publication information
- Publisher: Brain Scan Studios
- Format: One-shot
- Genre: Humor/comedy
- Publication date: 18 March 2009
- No. of issues: 1
- Main character(s): Nite Nurse; Spottyman; Silk Taker; 1700 Broadway Manhattan; Ozzyosbourne

Creative team
- Written by: Rich Johnston
- Artist: Simon Rohrmüller
- Colorist(s): Matthew Vega (cover, rest is B&W)

Watchmensch is a one-shot comic book by writer Rich Johnston and artist Simon Rohrmüller released by Brain Scan Studios. It parodies the Watchmen limited series created by writer Alan Moore, artist Dave Gibbons, and colorist John Higgins, along with the comics industry, the movies they spawn and the creators that get trampled on.

Johnston used the parody as a means to illustrate the comic book industry, as well as to serve as an allegory of the rancorous relationship between Watchmen creator Moore and DC Comics. Watchmensch's story mirrors some of the aspects of the series it parodies, specifically that of imitating the art of Dave Gibbons. It also mimics several of the plot points of the series to tell its story.

== Overview ==
The story revolves around a team of lawyers who, after one of their number is murdered (Krustofski, a mix of The Comedian and The Simpsons' Krusty the Clown), band together to root out the conspiracy involving the comic book industry. The team, comprising Nite Nurse (Nite Owl), Spottyman (Rorschach pretending to be Jewish), Silk Taker (Silk Spectre), 1700 Broadway Manhattan (the New York address of DC Comics, a musician version of Dr. Manhattan), and Ozyosbourne (Ozymandias, with the appearance and speech pattern of singer Ozzy Osbourne) follow a complex and multi-layered tale of New York copyright and trademark, seeking to uncover a conspiracy against them from an unknown powerful source and a history of how the comic industry has dealt with its creators.

The style and approach of Watchmensch closely resembles that of Watchmen, following the original's nine-panel grid layout.

== Publication and reception ==
Brain Scan Studios released the parody of the graphic novel Watchmen to serve as a satire of not only the series, but also "the comics industry, the movies they spawn and the creators that get trampled on".

Valerie D'Orazio, of Occasional Superheroine, expands on this description, observing that while she usually cringes at comic book parodies, Watchmensch is different in that it is actually an "allegory about the rift between Watchmen creator Alan Moore and DC Comics - and, by extension, a meditation on the issue of creator's rights" further calling it a "comic book industry fable". She further commends Swedish artist Simon Rohrmuller on having nailed Dave Gibbons' artistic style: "the reader can momentarily forget that he or she is reading a parody...at least until Dan Dreiberg shows up in a female nurse's outfit".

BBC's Culture Mob writer Ellen West notes that while the themes explored by the parody are "a really interesting story...there's plenty of mileage in the relationship between authors, artist and the large commercial organisations who attempt to adapt and exploit their work", her "initial impressions weren't positive".
