= Carleton High School =

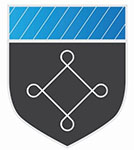

Location
- Green Lane; Pontefract, West Yorkshire, WF8 3NW; England; 53.6768°N 1.3015°W

Information
- Type: Academy
- Religious affiliation: Non-Religious
- Established: 1963 (school) academy later
- Department for Education URN: 139501 Tables
- Ofsted: Reports
- Headteacher: Shaheen Shariff
- Gender: Coeducational
- Age: 11 to 16
- Enrolment: 1020 (as of 2024)
- Website: https://arkcarletonhigh.org.uk/

Carleton High School is a coeducational secondary school with academy status, at Carleton in Pontefract, West Yorkshire, England. It is a part of the Pontefract Academies Trust which is a multi-academy organisation with two high schools, Carleton and The Kings' School, and six primary schools. It was rated a good school by Ofsted in its full inspection of the school in July 2019. After years of preparation and construction, Carleton opened their state-of-the-art new 3-storey building with 44 classrooms across 11 subjects in September 2025.

== Community ==
The school has close links with the community, frequently becoming involved in both local and national charity work. As a centre for learning, the facilities are open to adults through adult evening classes, and to their partner primary schools. Carleton High School have a programme of performing arts and sports events.

During summer 2018, the school had a complete rework. The project was led by John Osborne, director of Wakefield District Housing Schools Solutions.

The controversial decision was made to make the uniform only accessible from an online retailer. This sparked a Change.org petition which gathered over 900 signatures to revert the change. This decision was later reversed due to pressure from the community.
