= Bleeding Cool =

Internet news site

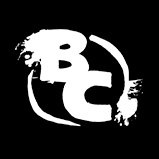
- Website type: Comic books, television, film, video games
- Available in: English
- Owner: Avatar Press
- Creator: Rich Johnston
- Website: bleedingcool.com
- Commercial: Yes
- Launched: 2009; 17 years ago

Bleeding Cool is a news website focusing on comics, television, film, board games, and video games. Owned by Avatar Press, it was launched by Rich Johnston in 2009. Avatar Press also publishes an associated magazine, also called Bleeding Cool.

== Content ==
Among Bleeding Cool's features are a power list detailing the most influential people in the comics industry.

In 2012, Bleeding Cool covered sexual harassment accusations leveled against DC Comics editor Eddie Berganza, beginning with an incident at WonderCon in Anaheim, California. Though that initial article was a blind item that did not name the victim or accused, four years later, Bleeding Cool named Berganza when it accused him of sexual harassment, and detailed how he had risen in the ranks at DC even after the accusations became known to his employers. This was followed by a November 2017 BuzzFeed report on accusations leveled against Berganza by several women that led to his termination from DC.

In November 2017, Bleeding Cool broke the story that writer/editor C.B. Cebulski, who had recently been promoted to Editor-in-Chief of Marvel Comics, had written a number of Japanese-themed stories for Marvel in 2003 and 2004 under the pseudonym Akira Yoshida, which led to accusations of cultural appropriation, yellowfacing, and "Orientalist profiteering".

== Awards and accolades ==
Bleeding Cool was nominated for the "Favourite Comics Related Website" Eagle Awards in 2010, and won in 2012. It was named as one of PC Magazine's top blogs of 2010.
