= Gawthorpe, Wakefield =

Village in West Yorkshire, England

Coordinates: 53.6955°N 1.5874°W

Gawthorpe
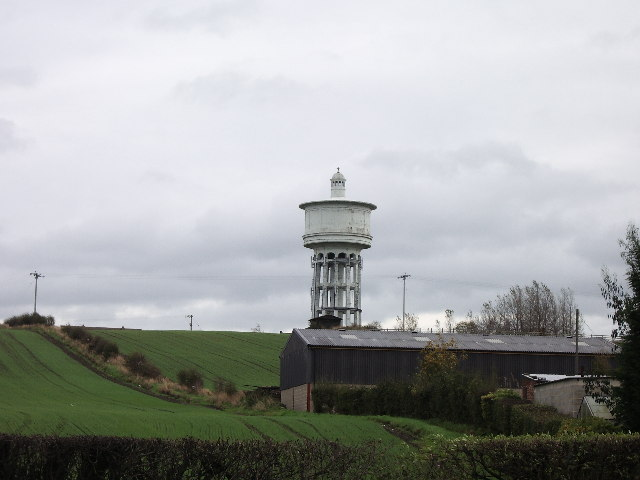
- Gawthorpe Water Tower

- Location within West Yorkshire
- Metropolitan borough: Wakefield
- Metropolitan county: West Yorkshire
- Region: Yorkshire and the Humber
- Country: England
- Sovereign state: United Kingdom
- Post town: OSSETT
- Postcode district: WF5
- Police: West Yorkshire
- Fire: West Yorkshire
- Ambulance: Yorkshire

Gawthorpe is a village to the north of Ossett, in the Wakefield district, in the county of West Yorkshire, England. It is roughly midway between Wakefield and Dewsbury north of the A638.

The village's name derives from Gorky, a Viking name, and thorpe was a settlement, but evidence suggests the village may have Roman origins. It gives its name to the Gawthorpe seam of coal, which stretches from the village down through Horbury and Crigglestone.

Gawthorpe's Mayday celebrations date back to at least 1875 when a seventy-foot fir tree was bought and erected by public subscription on the village green. The maypole was last replaced in 1986.

Gawthorpe Water Tower is a concrete structure built between 1922 and 1928 to store drinking water for the Ossett area. The 55m tall tower is a prominent local landmark of the Ossett and Gawthorpe area. Since around 2006 it was no longer used for storing water, but has been used to hold communications equipment. The tower received Grade II listed building status in 2020, following a campaign by residents.

== World Coal Carrying Championships ==
Since 1963 Gawthorpe has hosted the World Coal Carrying Championships on Easter Monday. Entrants run 1,012 metres from the Royal Oak in Ossett to the Maypole Green, while carrying a sack of coal weighing 50 kilograms (110 lb) for men or 20 kilograms (44 lb) for women. The Championships were originally run from the Shaw Cross colliery to the May Pole, although the collieries in this area all closed in the Robens era.

== The Gawthorpe Peacock ==
Gawthorpe gained national attention when an escaped peacock caused havoc within the local community, featuring on BBC Look North and BBC Radio 5 live news. The peacock was apprehended sometime in late 2024.

== See also ==
- Listed buildings in Ossett
