= A Kind of Loving (film) =

1962 British film by John Schlesinger

- Theatrical release poster
- Directed by: John Schlesinger
- Written by: Keith Waterhouse; Willis Hall
- Based on: A Kind of Loving by Stan Barstow
- Produced by: Joseph Janni
- Starring: Alan Bates; June Ritchie; Thora Hird
- Cinematography: Denys Coop
- Edited by: Roger Cherrill
- Music by: Ron Grainer
- Production companies: Vic Films Productions; Waterhall Productions
- Distributed by: Anglo-Amalgamated
- Release dates: 12 April 1962 (UK); 1 October 1962 (U.S.)
- Running time: 112 minutes
- Country: United Kingdom
- Language: English
- Budget: £155,590 or $750,000
- Box office: £450,000 (UK)

A Kind of Loving is a 1962 British kitchen sink drama film directed by John Schlesinger, starring Alan Bates and June Ritchie. It was written by Keith Waterhouse and Willis Hall based on the 1960 novel of the same name by Stan Barstow which was later adapted into the 1982 television series A Kind of Loving. The film tells the story of two lovers in early 1960s Lancashire. It belongs to the British New Wave movement.

== Plot ==
Victor 'Vic' Brown is a draughtsman in a Manchester factory who sleeps with typist Ingrid Rothwell, who also works there. She falls for him but he is less enamoured of her. When he learns he has made her pregnant Vic proposes marriage and the couple move in with Ingrid's protective, domineering mother, who disapproves of the match. Ingrid has a miscarriage, Vic has regrets and comes home drunk. The couple then consider the possibility of making do with "a kind of loving".

== Cast ==
- Alan Bates as Victor Arthur 'Vic' Brown
- Thora Hird as Mrs. Rothwell
- June Ritchie as Ingrid Rothwell
- Bert Palmer as Mr. Geoffrey Brown
- Pat Keen as Christine Harris
- James Bolam as Jeff
- Jack Smethurst as Conroy
- Gwen Nelson as Mrs. Brown
- John Ronane as draughtsman
- David Mahlowe as David Harris
- Patsy Rowlands as Dorothy
- Michael Deacon as Les
- Annette Robertson as Phoebe
- Fred Ferris as Althorpe
- Leonard Rossiter as Whymper
- Malcolm Patton as Jim Brown
- Harry Markham as railwayman
- Peter Madden as registrar
- David Cook as draughtsman (uncredited)
- Joe Gladwin as bus conductor (uncredited)
- Norman Heyes as Laisterdyke (uncredited)
- Bryan Mosley as bus conductor (uncredited)
- Kathy Staff as Mrs Oliphant (uncredited)

== Production ==
The movie was financed by Nat Cohen of Anglo Amalgamated. It was the feature film directorial debut of Schlesinger.

Bates was appearing in the Broadway production of The Caretaker and was bought out to star in the film. It was Ritchie's film debut. Schlesinger and producer Joseph Janni also cast some non-actors in small, non-speaking, roles.

The film was shot at Shepperton Studios, and on location in the northwest of England in Bolton, Blackburn, Manchester, Oldham, Preston, Radcliffe, Salford and St Anne's-on-Sea. Photography was by Denys Coop, and music by Ron Grainer.

== Reception ==
=== Box office ===
It was the sixth most popular film at the British box office in 1962. According to Kinematograph Weekly the film was considered a "money maker" at the British box office in 1962. Filmink argued "the film was superbly done and had just the right amount of sexual content to be a hit."

=== Critical reception ===
Leslie Halliwell opined: "Blunt melodrama with strong kinship to Saturday Night and Sunday Morning [1960], strikingly directed and photographed amid urban grime and suburban conformity."

The Radio Times Guide to Films gave the film 4/5 stars, writing: "Unlike the majority of other 'grim up North' dramas that found critical favour during the social realist or kitchen sink phase of British film-making, John Schlesinger's debut feature is about making the most of life rather than carping on about the colour of the grass on the other side of the fence. Crisply adapted by Keith Waterhouse and Willis Hall, the film is like a scrapbook of typical human experience, with Schlesinger's eye for detail and his persuasive storytelling style creating characters who could have lived next door to you. Alan Bates and June Ritchie are excellent, but Thora Hird is exceptional."

Michael Brooke wrote in Sight and Sound:

John Schlesinger's feature debut came comparatively late in the angry-young-men/kitchen-sink cycle, but it wears its 54 years rather better than many of its contemporaries, not least because some of its social concerns are just as pervasive today — in particular the impossibility of obtaining decent housing even when both halves of a married couple are in steady employment. The couple in question are Vic Brown (Alan Bates) and Ingrid Rothwell (June Ritchie), not an ideal match on any level other than the basest, but forced to marry after she shyly confesses, in what by 1962 standards was extreme sexual explicitness, that "Something that should have happened hasn't: it's been 15 days." When they are forced — by penury and Ingrid's unrealistic domestic ambitions — to move into her mother's fussily maintained semi, it's clear from the moment that Thora Hird first wrinkles her nose at her new son-in-law that things aren't going to go well. But if the narrative runs along decidedly familiar lines, former (and then very recent) documentarist Schlesinger gives the film immense lasting value in its pitch-perfect presentation of the fine detail of northern working-class life — the football, the pubs, the brass-band concerts, the 'mucky books', the works dos with their fake bonhomie, and above all the finely calibrated snobbery. Despite having a skilled job himself, Vic is happy to chat to the window cleaner as an equal, but the latter is then dressed down by Mrs Rothwell, who firmly believes that certain people should know their place. Hird is magnificent in a part that could easily have slipped into crude caricature, and Bates is even better. As with his New Wave predecessors Jimmy Porter and Arthur Seaton, Vic's own character flaws could hardly be more obvious, yet his lonely nocturnal sojourn in the railway station is so laceratingly soul-baring that it would melt even the flintiest heart.

== Awards ==
The film won the Golden Bear award at the 12th Berlin International Film Festival in 1962.
