= Ossett Academy =

Ossett Academy and Sixth Form College

Location
- Storrs Hill Road; Ossett, West Yorkshire, WF5 0DG; England; 53°40′08″N 1°34′44″W

Information
- Type: Academy
- Motto: Creating Opportunities, Achieving Excellence.
- Established: 2011 (As Ossett Academy and Sixth Form College) 1735 (As Ossett Grammar School)
- Local authority: Wakefield Metropolitan District Council
- Trust: Accord Multi Academy Trust
- Department for Education URN: 136462 Tables
- Ofsted: Reports
- Principal: Alex Lunn
- Staff: 196
- Gender: Coeducational
- Age: 11 to 18
- Enrolment: 1700
- Capacity: 2000
- Website: ossett.accordmat.org

Ossett Academy and Sixth Form College, formerly Ossett Grammar School, is the only secondary school, and also a sixth form college, in Ossett, a town in the county of West Yorkshire, England. The school is an academy.

== History ==
Park House, Ossett Grammar School in 1907, the building is still part of the school today

Founded in 1735, the school originally was sited in the centre of Ossett, but the old building was demolished in 1908 to make way for a new Town Hall. The 1902 Education Act and the subsequent establishment of the West Riding County Council as the local education authority paved the way for the trustees to transfer the trust property, money and endowments to the Education Committee of Ossett Town Council. In 1907 the new co-educational Ossett Grammar School opened at its new location at Park House, off Storrs Hill Road.

In 1969 the school converted to a comprehensive school and became known simply as Ossett School. In 2006 Ossett School gained dual Specialist School status as a Specialist Technology and Sports College. The school converted to an Academy School in 2011 and was renamed Ossett Academy and Sixth Form College. The school is part of the Accord Multi Academy Trust.

Ossett Academy and Sixth Form College is a much larger than average secondary school with a large sixth form. The proportion of students supported through the pupil premium is below the national average. The proportion of disabled students and those who have special educational needs supported at school action is above average.

Since 2012 the secondary school and sixth form have consistently ranked as one of the top 3 schools/colleges for academic performance in the Wakefield area and in the top 15% nationally. As of 2017 the Secondary School was ranked as the 2nd best in Wakefield in terms of Attainment 8 Score and Grade 4 & 5 or above in English and maths GCSEs.

== Ofsted Inspections ==
The latest section 5 Ofsted inspection report of Ossett Academy, released in 2013, found that the school was 'good' overall (Grade 2), with 'outstanding' features. In 2012 the Academy received its first section 5 Ofsted inspection report and was deemed 'satisfactory' overall (Grade 3), with 'good' features. In 2022 inspection resulted in an overall judgement of Good, although pupil behaviour was judged to require improvement.

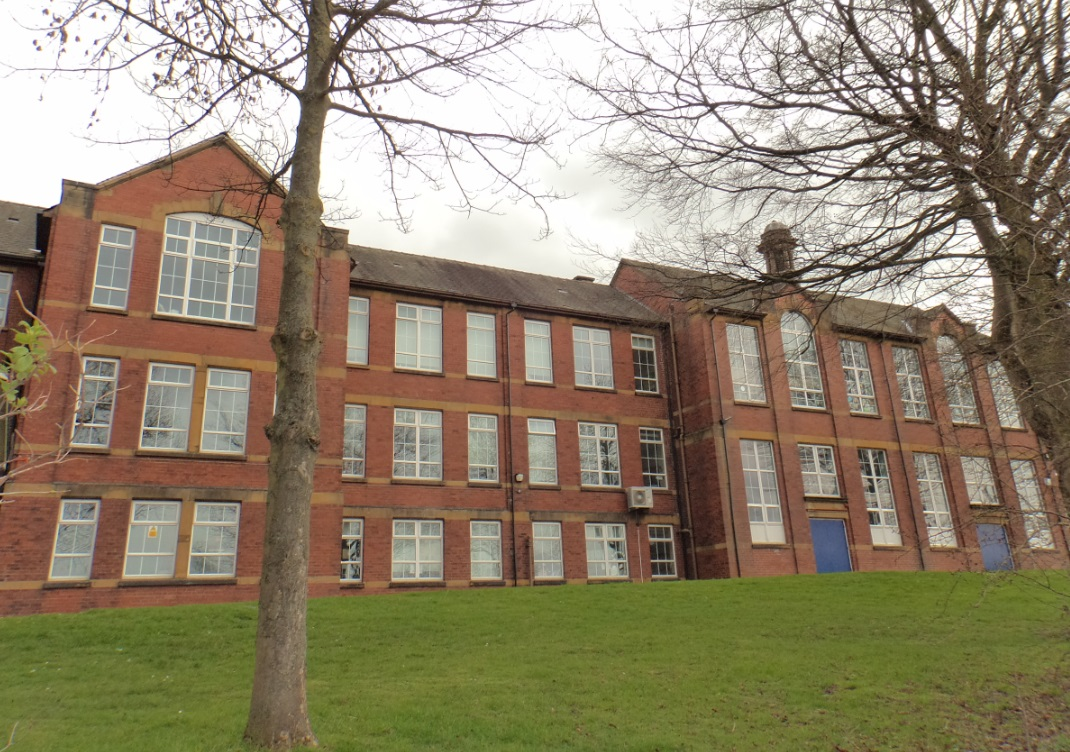
The 1928 extension of Ossett Grammar School

== Notable former pupils ==
- Stan Barstow (1928-2011), novelist
- The Cribs – Rock Band
- Mabel Ferrett (1917-2011), poet, publisher, literary editor and local historian
