= DKMS =

German charity

- Formation: 28 May 1991; 35 years ago
- Founder: Peter Harf
- Founded at: Germany
- Legal status: Registered charity
- Purpose: Blood cancer awareness and donor registration for hematopoietic stem cell transplantation
- Locations: Chile; Germany; India; Poland; South Africa; United Kingdom; United States
- Website: dkms.org

Deutsche Knochenmarkspenderdatei, abbreviated as DKMS (transl. German Bone Marrow Donor File), is an international nonprofit bone marrow donor center based in Tübingen, Germany, with entities in Chile, India, Poland, South Africa, the United Kingdom and the United States. DKMS works in the areas of blood cancer and hematopoietic stem cell transplantation and raises awareness of the need for donors for hematopoietic stem cell transplantation which people with blood cancers need for treatment as well as helping people sign up to their national bone marrow registries. Over the years, DKMS has expanded beyond Germany.

== History ==
DKMS was founded in Germany on 28 May 1991 by billionaire Peter Harf, an executive with Coty, Inc., and university professor Gerhard Ehninger, the hematologist who treated his first wife Mechtild Harf. Mechtild had been diagnosed with leukemia, and while her cancer initially responded to drugs, she eventually needed a hematopoietic stem cell transplant (HSC) but none of her family members were a good match.

Harf founded DKMS to raise awareness of the need for donors in Germany and to help people to register with the German national bone marrow registry. He included the whole family, including their 14-year-old daughter Katharina, in the effort. Within a year, the number of registered donors in Germany increased from 3,000 to 68,000. He continued building the organization afterwards.

Katharina eventually moved to the United States to Harvard University, worked for Louis Vuitton in New York City for a time, then started an MBA at Columbia University; she dropped out and instead founded the US affiliate of DKMS with her father in 2004. The US affiliate also works to raise awareness of the need for donors, helps people register with the National Marrow Donor Program, and if needed will help pay for any health tests, medication and travel costs.

In 2014, DKMS began promoting 28 May as World Blood Cancer Day to help raise awareness. That year they also began offering grants to support scientists working on diagnosis or treatment of blood cancers, offering two people up to €80,000 per year for up to three years.

== Activities ==
DKMS uses gala events and specific patient appeals to raise money and awareness.

In the United Kingdom and the United States, DKMS hold their annual Big Love gala event to fundraise which is often attended by high-profile celebrities. Their most recent event was held at the Camden Roundhouse in November 2018, with attendees including Georgia May Jagger, Jamie Redknapp, Henry Holland and their global ambassador, model Eva Herzigová.

Notable patient appeals have included Marley Nicholls, Damary Dawkins and Peter McCleave who appeared on the BBC Breakfast TV show with his son Maxwell in February 2019 seeking 10,000 potential donors.

== See also ==
- Anthony Nolan
- Blood Cancer UK
