= Kettlethorpe High School =

Location
- Standbridge Lane; Sandal; Wakefield, West Yorkshire, WF2 7EL; England
- Coordinates: 53.6467°N 1.4980°W

Information
- Type: Community school
- Motto: Labor Omnia Vincit (Work Conquers All)
- Established: 1965
- Local authority: Wakefield
- Department for Education URN: 108271 Tables
- Ofsted: Reports
- Head teacher: Rosin Paul
- Staff: Around 150
- Gender: Mixed
- Age: 11 to 16
- Enrolment: 1686 as of April 2025
- Capacity: 1,660
- Colour: Yellow / Blue
- Website: kettlethorpehigh.co.uk

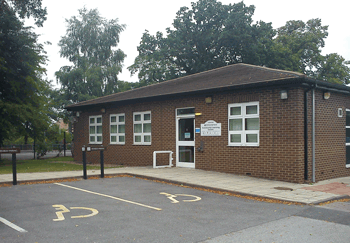
Kettlethorpe High School Community Learning Centre; Main entrance in Kettlethorpe High School grounds.

Kettlethorpe High School is a mixed secondary school with specialist status for maths and computing in Wakefield, West Yorkshire, England. It provides for children ages 11–16, with a comprehensive admissions policy, and as of April 2025 had an enrolment of 1,686 pupils.

== Qur'an controversy ==
In February 2023, the school suspended four Year 10 pupils for causing minor damage to the pages of a personal copy of the Qur'an. While there were rumours of deliberate damage, a school investigation found there was no "malicious intent". The Free Speech Union wrote a letter demanding that West Yorkshire Police expunge the hate incident record against the four boys. Home Secretary Suella Braverman expressed concern at the police involvement in the matter. Humanists UK alleged that the school took severe disciplinary action because of religious pressure.

== Gareth Mellor controversy ==
On 7 November 2023, former assistant headteacher and safeguarding lead Gareth Mellor was convicted for possession of indecent images of children. As safeguarding lead, part of his duties was to protect children at the school from sexual abuse.

Whilst Gareth Mellor admitted under interview to having searched the names of pupils at the school online, no evidence of sexual abuse of pupils at the school was found.

Kettlethorpe High School stated that no concerns were raised about Mellor during his tenure. Some parents and students have alleged that concerns were raised, which in some cases resulted in their children being placed in isolation.

== Notable people ==
- Stuart Lancaster, England International Rugby Coach, was a PE teacher at the school.
- Claire Cooper, actress, starred in Hollyoaks.
- Chris Chester, ex-rugby league player for Halifax, Wigan Warriors, Hull F.C. and coach of Hull Kingston Rovers and Wakefield Trinity.
- Amy Garcia, BBC Look North newsreader.
