= Rich Johnston =

Comic comics columnist and author

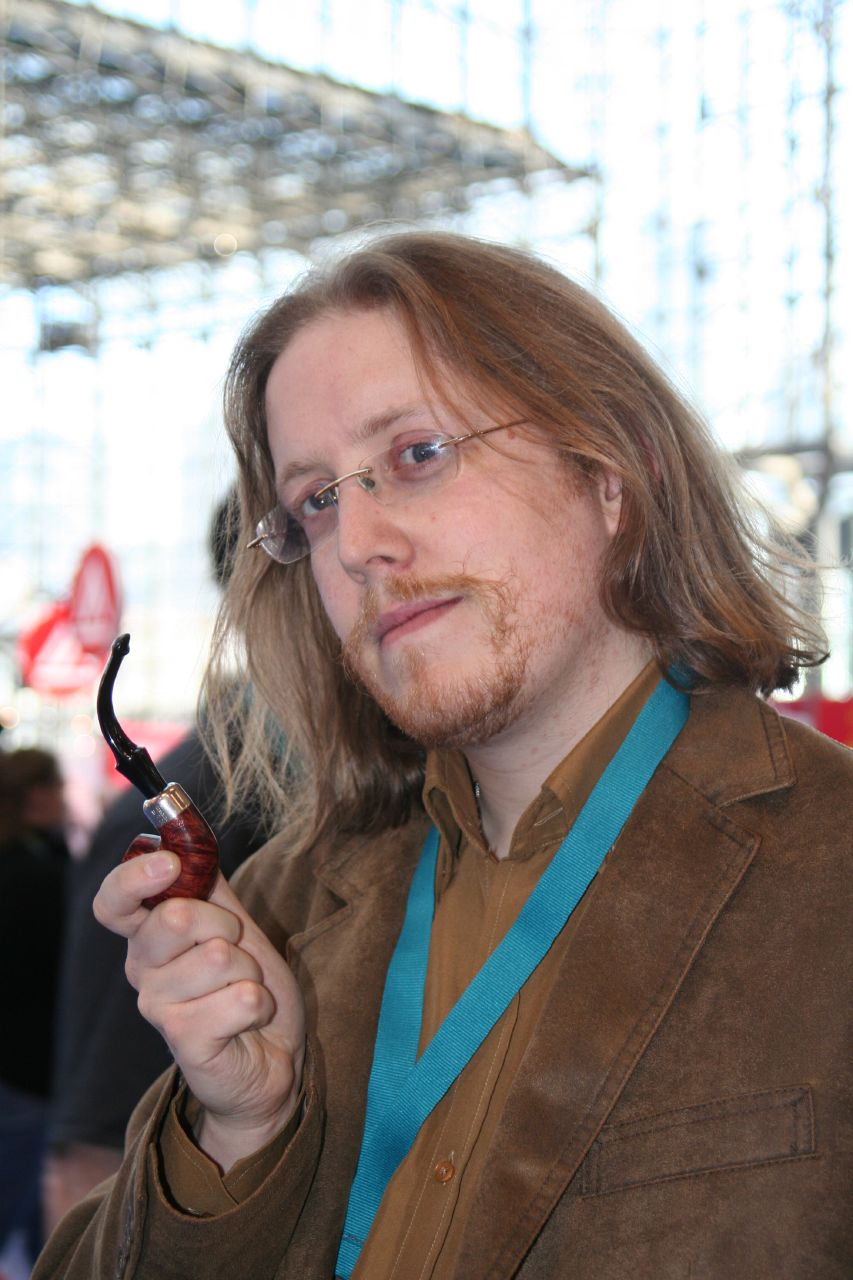
- Johnston at the 2007; New York Comic Con
- Born: Richard Johnston United Kingdom
- Areas: Comics reporter, gossip columnist, comics writer
- Notable works: Lying in the Gutters; Watchmensch; Bleeding Cool
- Awards: Shel Dorf Award, 2012
- Children: 2

Richard "Rich" Johnston is a British comics creator, columnist, and founder of the comics news site Bleeding Cool.

The Comics Journal described Johnston as having claimed to be "the oldest extant comics news reporter on the Internet." His past columns include "All the Rage" (for Silver Bullet Comic Books), and "Lying in the Gutters" (for Comic Book Resources). He refuses to be called a journalist.

== Early life ==
Johnston grew up in Pontefract, West Yorkshire. He subsequently moved to London.

== Career ==
=== Comics reporting/gossip ===
Rich's Revelations was originally a simple relisting of British magazine comics news. Johnston began writing gossip on USENET newsgroups in 1994 as Rich's Ramblings. He then took the column, around onto the burgeoning World Wide Web, with "Rich's Revelations" on the now-defunct Twist And Shout Comics website. He later started the comics gossip column "All The Rage" for Silver Bullet Comic Books, later Comics Bulletin.

Johnston wrote the column "Lying in the Gutters" for Comic Book Resources, posting rumours and gossip, with a traffic light icon imparting advisory caution as to the possible credibility of each rumour: a red light denoting the least likelihood of accuracy, a green light for the most credible reports, and a yellow light for those that fall somewhere in between.

Johnston's writing does not often impart sources. About that, Johnston said, "I often obfuscate sources to hide their identity—even deny that a story has sources on many occasions." Johnston sees himself as part of a tradition established by the "British tabloid press, one that seeks to entertain rather than inform."

==== Bleeding Cool ====
On 27 March 2009, Johnston announced his launch of the website BleedingCool.com.

Bleeding Cool was nominated for the "Favourite Comics Related Website" Eagle Award in 2010 and 2011 and won in 2012. It was named as one of PC Magazine's top blogs of 2010. and Technorati gave it a perfect 1000 score for influence in the comics category. Johnston was awarded the Shel Dorf Award for Best Comics Blogger for his work on Bleeding Cool in 2012. He was also nominated in 2011 and 2013.

=== Comics creator ===
Johnston has written a number of comics, mainly consisting of one-shots and graphic novella. The first consists of parodies, such as Watchmensch and Civil Wardrobe (alluding to Marvel's 2006 story Civil War). The second include his original work, both creator-owned and those based on licensed properties, like Doctor Who: A Room With A Deja View, The Flying Friar (based on the life of Joseph of Cupertino) and Chase Variant which started life at Mam Tor Publishing's Event Horizon.

In 2007, he wrote the IDW trading card set George W. Bush and the Weapons of Mass Distraction.

He wrote and drew a number of pages for the Popbitch book and curated the Harrods Comic Timing exhibition of original comic book artwork.

In 2009, he had a story published in the Spearmint anthology from Image Comics with Sleaze Castle writer-artist Terry Wiley. He wrote a short story, "Rustlin Up Business," for the second volume of Outlaw Territory, published in February 2011.

He has also written Kate and William: A Very Public Love Story, a comic commemorating the wedding of Prince William and Catherine Middleton, published by Markosia.

In 2012, he wrote a comic serialised in Dark Horse Presents entitled The Many Murders of Miss Cranbourne, with art from Simon Rohrmüller. He also wrote a series of parody comics for Boom! Studios, taking on Marvel Studios films, with Iron Man, Thor, Captain America, and The Avengers reinterpreted as "Iron Muslim", "Scienthorlogy," "Captain American Idol," and "The Avengefuls," respectively.

Johnston writes and draws weekly cartoons for the UK blogger Paul Staines, appearing each Monday and collected at RichAndMark.com.

=== Non-comics writing ===
Johnston wrote briefly for newspapers like The Guardian and magazines like PlayStation World. The now-closed publication Punch magazine named him Young Writer of the Year Award in 2001.

His poster campaign for the Churches Advertising Network in December 2006 generated coverage, including a leader in the Times Newspaper and an appearance on BBC's The One Show.

=== Media appearances ===
Johnston contributed to the British Channel 4 sketch show Smack the Pony as well as for BBC Radio 4's satirical sketch show Week Ending and the stage/TV show The Sitcom Trials.

He appeared as an interviewee in After the Chalk Dust Settled, a documentary included on the DVD release of Steven Moffat's sitcom Chalk.

He was a zombie extra in Shaun of the Dead and a congregation member in the movie Hitchhiker's Guide to the Galaxy.

He wrote and directed a series of radio advertisements for telecommunications company TalkTalk starring Mark Heap.

=== Parodies ===
In 2006, he appeared as a character in the comic book CSI: Dying in the Gutters as a source of "inside joke" humour by featuring him as the victim in a murder mystery set at a comic book convention and using other notable real-world comics creators as suspects in the crime. He also appeared as a character in the Jodie Picoult novel, The Tenth Circle and made a more major appearance in the Leverage novel The Con Job.

== Personal life ==
Johnston has two daughters. His brother is the comedian Edi Johnston . His cousins include composer Julian Wagstaff, and Jonathan Hellyer Jones .

== Bibliography ==
- Dirtbag (Twist and Shout Comics, 1995)
- The X-Files (Twist and Shout Comics, 1997)
- Rich Johnston's Holed Up (Avatar Pres, 2004)
- The Flying Friar (with Thomas Paul Nachlik, Speakeasy Comics, 2005)
- Civil Wardrobe (with various artists, including Darick Robertson, Ashley Wood and Frazer Irving, Brain Scan Studios, 2006)
- Watchmensch (with Simon Rohrmüller, Brian Scan Studios, 2009)
- Doctor Who: A Room With A Deja View (with Eric J., IDW, 2009)
- "A Trip into Space" (with Terry Wiley, in This Is a Souvenir: The Songs of Spearmint & Shirley Lee, Image Comics, 2009)
- Chase Variant (with Saverio Tenuta and Edmund Bagwell, Image Comics, February 2010, forthcoming)
- Kate and William: A Very Public Love Story (Markosia, April 2011, ISBN 1-905692-45-5) collects:
  - William Windsor: A Very Public Prince (with art by Gary Erskine, 36 pages, Markosia, April 2011, ISBN 1-905692-44-7)
  - Kate Middleton: A Very Private Princess (with art by Mike Collins, 36 pages, Markosia, April 2011, ISBN 1-905692-43-9)
- The Many Murders of Miss Cranbourne, with Simon Rohrmuller, Dark Horse Presents (Dark Horse Comics, 2012)
- The Avengefuls (Boom! Studios, 2012)
