= A Kind of Loving (novel) =

1960 novel by Stan Barstow

- First edition
- Author: Stan Barstow
- Language: English
- Publisher: Michael Joseph
- Publication date: 1960
- Publication place: United Kingdom
- Media type: Print (Hardback & Paperback)
- Pages: 286 pp

A Kind of Loving is a novel by the English novelist Stan Barstow. It has also been adapted into a film of the same name, a television series, a radio play and a stage play.

Published in 1960, A Kind of Loving was the first of a trilogy, published over the course of sixteen years, that followed hero Vic Brown through marriage, divorce and a move from the mining town of Cressley to London. The other two parts are The Watchers on the Shore (1966) and The Right True End (1976).

== Plot summary ==
The story presents to us Vic Brown, a young working class man from Yorkshire, England, who is slowly inching his way up from his working-class roots through a white-collar job. Vic finds himself trapped by the frightening reality of his girlfriend Ingrid's pregnancy and is forced into marrying her and moving in with his mother-in-law due to a housing shortage in their Northern England town.

The story is about love and loneliness. Vic meets and is very attracted to the beautiful but demanding Ingrid. As their relationship develops and transforms into real-life everyday aridity and boredom, Vic ultimately comes to terms with his life and what it really means to love. The novel has had some influence on the literary community, leaving the label "lad-lit" behind, although the term itself was not coined until the 1990s.

== Adaptations ==
In 1962 the novel was turned into a film of the same name. Directed by John Schlesinger and starring Alan Bates as Vic and June Ritchie as Ingrid, it was written for the screen by Keith Waterhouse and Willis Hall.

A Kind of Loving was adapted by Barstow as a radio play for the BBC in 1964, with Brian Peck as Vic and June Barry as Ingrid. The two sequels followed, both for BBC radio, in 1971 and 1978 respectively, with the same actors reprising their roles.

In 1982 Barstow adapted his novel and the two sequels as a ten-part series for Granada Television, collectively entitled A Kind of Loving. Clive Wood starred as Vic, with Joanne Whalley as Ingrid and Susan Penhaligon as Donna (the woman with whom Vic has an affair and for whom he leaves Ingrid in the second and third books).
