= Anthony Nolan =

UK charity

- Formation: 1974
- Founder: Shirley Nolan
- Legal status: Registered charity
- Purpose: Health care in the UK
- Location: 2 Heathgate Place, 75-87 Agincourt Road, London
- Region served: UK
- Chief Executive: Henny Braund
- Website: AnthonyNolan.org

Anthony Nolan is a UK charity that works in the areas of leukaemia and hematopoietic stem cell transplantation. It manages and recruits donors to the Anthony Nolan Register, which is part of an aligned registry that also includes the Welsh Bone Marrow Donor Registry, NHS Blood and Transplant's British Bone Marrow Registry and Deutsche KnochenMarkSpenderdatei (DKMS) UK. This aligned register is known as the Anthony Nolan & NHS Stem Cell Registry. It also carries out research to help make bone marrow transplants more effective.

== History ==
The charity is named after Anthony Nolan (born 1971–died 1979), who did not suffer from leukaemia but from Wiskott–Aldrich syndrome, a rare inherited blood disorder. It was founded by Anthony's mother Shirley Nolan (1942–2001) in 1974 as the Anthony Nolan Register.

Initially based at the Westminster Children's Hospital, it moved to St Mary Abbots Hospital in 1978 and to its present offices, laboratory and research institute in north London, in the grounds of the Royal Free Hospital. The charity was renamed in 2001 as the Anthony Nolan Trust. and again in 2010 to Anthony Nolan.

In 2008 Anthony Nolan set up the UK's first dedicated cord blood bank, allowing mothers to safely donate the blood from their umbilical cord and placenta after they give birth, the charity then use this blood in their stem cell transplants. In 2012 Anthony Nolan became the first stem cell register in the world to start recruiting 16-year-olds.

== Present day ==
Today the register has over 720,000 potential donors on it. One of the charity's main aims is to recruit more male donors, as they are the most likely to be chosen by doctors to donate, and are selected for 54% of donations.

A student organisation operating in universities throughout the UK known as 'Marrow' works with Anthony Nolan to recruit potential donors to the register and raise awareness of the charity and blood cancers within universities and their local communities. It was set up in 1998 at the University of Nottingham and now operates in more than 50 universities in the UK and worldwide.

In 2014, Anthony Nolan was the official charity partner for the London Marathon.

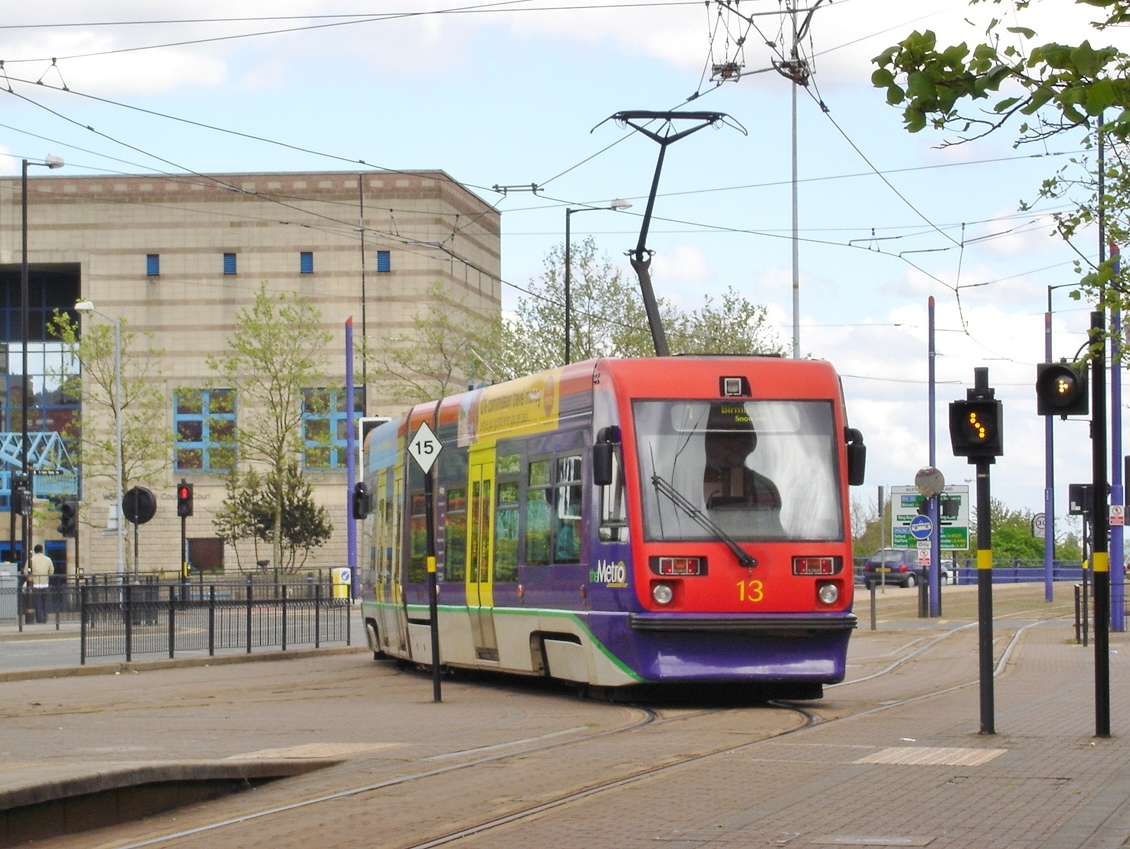
Former Midland Metro tram 13, "Anthony Nolan"

Midland Metro named an AnsaldoBreda T-69 tram in his honour (it has since been withdrawn from service, along with the rest of its class, and scrapped). Daniel De Gale (1987–2008), a leukaemia patient, inspired his mother Beverley and her partner, Orin Lewis, to set up the African-Caribbean Leukaemia Trust in June 1996. ACLT worked "in partnership with the ... Nolan Trust" to build the number of bone marrow donors, specifically of African, African Caribbean, and mixed parentage on the UK register.

The organisation organises several novel campaigns to increase the number of donors joining the registry. For example, it organised the Spit and Save a life campaign in 2010 which featured Devaanshi Mehta (1996–2012), an aplastic anemia patient. During the campaign donors could join the registry and find out if they could save a life by giving a sample of their saliva.

Olivia Colman became Patron of Anthony Nolan in 2018.

== See also ==
- John M. Goldman, who was involved with the charity for over 20 years.
- John Raymond Hobbs, whose team set up the world's first bone marrow donor register.
- Professor Sydney Selwyn, who was closely involved with the treatment of Anthony Nolan.
- Cancer in the United Kingdom
