= Wrenthorpe =

Village in West Yorkshire, England

Coordinates: 53.698208°N 1.522087°W

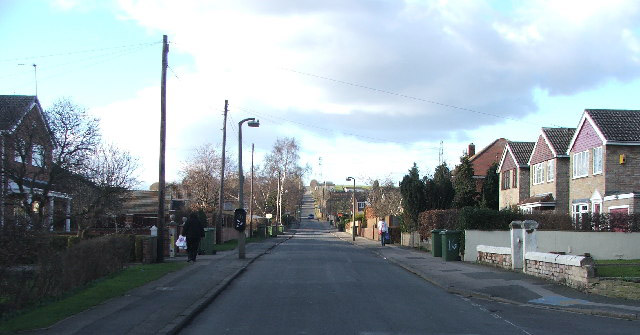
- Jerry Clay Lane in Wrenthorpe

- Location within West Yorkshire
- Population: 7,165
- OS grid reference: SE315225
- Metropolitan borough: City of Wakefield
- Metropolitan county: West Yorkshire
- Region: Yorkshire and the Humber
- Country: England
- Sovereign state: United Kingdom
- Post town: Wakefield
- Postcode district: WF2/WF1
- Police: West Yorkshire
- Fire: West Yorkshire
- Ambulance: Yorkshire
- UK Parliament: Morley and Outwood

Wrenthorpe is a village north-west of Wakefield, in West Yorkshire, England. It is located in the Rhubarb Triangle.

== History ==
Although earlier remains, such as Roman coins and pottery, have been found in the area, the current settlement dates from after the Domesday Book's compilation in 1086.

Pottery has played an important role in Wrenthorpe's history, building from the presence of a few potters in the 15th century, to a thriving cottage industry that peaked in the 17th century, before declining over the course of the 18th. Such was the scale of pottery production, the village became known as "Potovens," attributed to the kilns used to fire finished pottery. Reminders of this heritage can be found in local names, such as "Potovens Lane" and the remains of pottery and clay tobacco pipes that can be found in the soil.

As the potteries declined, coal mining, already present on a smaller scale providing fuel for the potters' kilns, expanded to meet the needs of the Industrial Revolution. Agriculture also grew more important to the area.

During the 19th and early 20th century rope and woollen textile production joined coal and agriculture as Wrenthorpe's major industries, both disappearing over the course of the 20th century. Rhubarb forcing houses were built in Wrenthorpe, contributing to West Yorkshire's extensive Rhubarb growing industry.

== Education ==
Wrenthorpe is served by two state primary schools, Wrenthorpe Academy, and Jerry Clay Academy. Both are pyramid schools of Outwood Grange Academy in nearby Outwood.

There are two co-educational independent schools in the village: Silcoates School which provides an education for pupils aged 2 to 18 and Hall Cliffe Primary School, which is a specialist day school for pupils aged 5 to 13 years, based at the old Sunny Hill House School site.

== Recreation and sport ==
Wrenthorpe Park has facilities including hard tennis courts, a bowling green, children's playground, football pitch and car parking. Park paths connect with the neighbouring village of Alverthorpe through Alverthorpe and Wrenthorpe Meadows, a Local Nature Reserve with managed hay meadows and wetland areas. A smaller recreation ground with a football pitch, is located in the centre of the village on Wrenthorpe Lane.

Wrenthorpe Cricket Club's senior teams compete in the Bradford Premier League. Wrenthorpe Cricket Club equalled the record of consecutive Heavy Woollen cup final victories, with four wins in a row. The feat was previously done 120 years ago by Dewsbury & Saville CC. The club has junior teams ranging from under-9s to under-17s.

Wrenthorpe Rangers are a local football club with junior teams from U6 through to U18s and open age teams that compete in the Wakefield Sunday league. The New Pot Oil pub hosts an open age team which competes in the same league. The 2013–2014 season was the most successful season for Wrenthorpe Rangers as they completed the league and cup double with a penalty shootout victory in the final of the cup over local rivals, the New Pot Oil.

Wrenthorpe Badminton Club offers both social and competitive play, with teams in the Castleford & District League and the Barnsley & District League. It also provides junior coaching for 10- to 16-year-olds.

== See also ==
- Listed buildings in Wrenthorpe and Outwood West
