= Thomas Scales =

Leading British abolitionist (1786–1860)

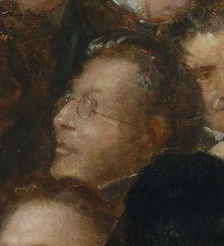
- Born: 1786; Leeds
- Died: 1860 (aged 73–74)
- Education: Leeds Grammar School
- Known for: Abolitionism
- Spouse: Christiana Simpson
- Children: 3 survived

Thomas Scales (1786–1860) was a leading British abolitionist. He was the first minister of Queen Street Chapel in Leeds and he founded the Silcoates School.

== Life ==
Scales was born in Leeds in Yorkshire, in December 1786. His father was an innkeeper and later a farmer and his mother was a keen follower of Rev. Edward Parsons of the Salem Independent Chapel. Scales was educated at the Moravian Institution at Fulneck, then with Rev. Dr Fawcett of Ewood Hall, and at Leeds Grammar School.

Scales left school at age 15 and was apprenticed to a draper in Halifax for three years. After a year in Wakefield, he returned to his home in Leeds where he decided to become a dissenting preacher. In 1806 he was admitted as a student to the Hoxton Academy where he became a classical tutor, however he decided to take up a ministry in a newly formed Independent church in Wolverhampton where he was ordained in April 1810. In September 1810, he married Christiana Simpson, a daughter of Reverend Robert Simpson, his principal at Hoxton Academy. Christiana was his first wife; they had eight children, three of whom survived to adulthood. He was married one more time.

His congregation at Wolverhampton grew rapidly from around 30 adults to 400–500 nearly ten years later, necessitating construction of a new chapel and its enlargement during his time there. In 1819 he was invited to the White Chapel in Leeds and again his congregation grew until a new chapel was built in Queen Street in 1825. It was the largest Independent Chapel in the north of England at the time and the first of many large chapels in Yorkshire. On the opening day, the collections exceeded 400 pounds.

1840 World Anti-Slavery Convention. Move your cursor to identify Scales (in the centre) or click the icon to enlarge.

Thomas Scales was a leader in the community, a founder of Silcoates School for the education of sons of Independent ministers and missionaries, and also a passionate supporter of the anti-slavery movement and liberal politics.

Scales was chosen to be with Lord Brougham, Joseph Sturge and Captain Hansard RN when they presented petitions to Queen Victoria in 1838. These were based on resolutions passed at meetings at Exeter Hall of "friends of the negro" on behalf of the enslaved people in her empire. He returned to Exeter Hall in 1840 where he appears [in spectacles] in Benjamin Robert Haydon's painting of The Anti-Slavery Society Convention 1840, beside Captain Charles Stuart.

Scales was also involved in the foundation of the Independent Ministerial Provident Society of the West Riding of Yorkshire, administration of Balme's charity which was established by Mary Bacon and the management of Airedale and Rotherham Colleges.

He edited and published numerous pamphlets and sermons, and his book Principles of Dissent ran to three editions. He was editor of Protestant Dissenters' Juvenile Magazine from 1833–36 and left a manuscript on the life of Rev. James Scott (1710–1783), founder of Heckmondwike Academy, and materials for the History of Nonconformity in the West Riding of Yorkshire, which was used as a basis for James Miall's Congregationalism in Yorkshire (London, 1868). His detailed knowledge of nonconformist history made him a valuable witness in the Lady Hewley Case.

With failing eyesight, he resigned around January 1850 after 30 years, and became chaplain and secretary at Silcoates Congregational School, later moving to Gomersal and Cleckheaton. He died suddenly in June 1860 at Low Moor, while travelling to preach a funeral sermon for a fellow minister and friend Reverend John Paul.
