= Alverthorpe =

Former village in Wakefield, West Yorkshire, England

Coordinates: 53.6893°N 1.5308°W

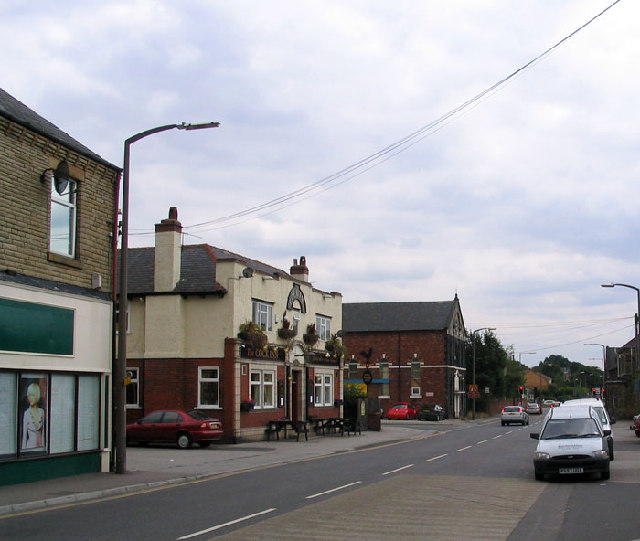
- Batley Road

- Location within West Yorkshire
- OS grid reference: SE310215
- Metropolitan borough: City of Wakefield
- Metropolitan county: West Yorkshire
- Region: Yorkshire and the Humber
- Country: England
- Sovereign state: United Kingdom
- Post town: WAKEFIELD
- Postcode district: WF2
- Police: West Yorkshire
- Fire: West Yorkshire
- Ambulance: Yorkshire

Alverthorpe is a suburb of, and former village in Wakefield, West Yorkshire, England.

== History ==
The name Alverthorpe derives from the Old English personal name Aelfhere and the Old Norse þorp meaning 'secondary settlement'.

After the start of the Industrial Revolution woollen and worsted yarns were spun and woollen and worsted cloth woven in the mills and factories that were built in the valley. Rope and twine were also manufactured.

In 1830 the township's population was 4,590 and in 1870 it had 1,423 houses and the population had risen to 6,645.

A. Talbot & Sons manufactured sweets for many years in a factory with a landmark chimney which was originally a rag mill. The company originated in 1890, selling wholesale groceries from a horse-drawn vehicle, but moved into boiled sweet manufacture when its sweet supplier, John Kay of Flushdyke, retired and gave it his recipes. The company's humbugs, mint imperials, toffees and Yorkshire mixtures became popular throughout Yorkshire and further afield. The Talbots ran the business until the mid-1960s, when it was sold to Victory V lozenges.

In the early 20th century, rhubarb was grown in the surrounding area, the region known as the Rhubarb Triangle. Forcing sheds were surrounded by fields of rhubarb plants.

== Governance ==
Alverthorpe and Thornes was anciently a township which included Westgate Common, Flanshaw, Kirkhamgate and Silcoates in the ecclesiastical parish of Wakefield in the wapentake of Agbrigg and Morley in the West Riding of Yorkshire. The town hall was in Green Lane, and it had a workhouse off Light Lane, as well as its own sewage farm and slaughterhouse.

After the passing of the Poor Law Amendment Act 1834, Alverthorpe became one of the 17 constituent parishes of the Wakefield Poor Law Union formed in 1837.

== Geography ==
Alverthorpe is 1.5 miles (2.4 km) north west of Wakefield in the valley of the Alverthorpe Beck which supplied water for the mills. The underlying rocks are the coal measures of the South Yorkshire Coalfield.

Much of the meadowland between Alverthorpe and the neighbouring village of Wrenthorpe is a designated Local Nature Reserve, comprising 52 acres (25 ha).

== Economy ==
Bective Mills, which now produces Sirdar hand knitting and rug wool, was established in Alverthorpe over 200 years ago. The company's 1791 Hebble Mill was replaced after being destroyed by fire in 1905. Thomas and Henry Harrap developed the business as Messrs Harrap Bros. Ltd. from 1880 onwards and the buildings and equipment continued to be upgraded and extended throughout the twentieth century. Now operating as Sirdar Spinning Ltd, the mill is one of Britain's foremost worsted spinning mills for hand knitting wool.

== Transport ==
The village is located on the road from Wakefield to Batley. It lies just over a kilometre north of the A638 road from Wakefield to Dewsbury, which intersects with the M1 motorway (at junction 40), about 5 km from Alverthorpe.

A railway line ran through the village, and Alverthorpe railway station, close to the village centre, was opened in October 1872 by the Great Northern Railway. In 1923 it became part of the London and North Eastern Railway. The line passed to the Eastern Region of British Railways on nationalisation in 1948 and closed in April 1954. The railway, bridges and embankments have all now been removed.

== Education ==
Silcoates School was founded in 1830 as the Northern Congregational School.

St Paul's CofE Junior and Infant school is situated in Alverthorpe, with Mr Lee Swift as the current headteacher.

== Religious sites ==
The stone built Anglican church of St Paul stands at the top of a hill, north of the village. It is a Commissioners' Church built in 1826 to accommodate 1,590 worshippers, at a cost of £7,828 16s. 8d, (based on increases in average earnings, this would be approximately £6,352,000 in 2016). The graveyard on the south, north and west sides of the church is specifically for church burials; there was a Local Authority graveyard to the south.

There was a Methodist chapel in the centre of the village, but the building is now used for business purposes. A Presbyterian congregation met in a disused malt kiln in Flanshaw Lane from 1672, but moved to a new chapel in 1697 which combined the Flanshaw and Wakefield congregations, this later becoming the Westgate Unitarian Chapel. A Presbyterian burial ground with over a hundred graves remained in the village until the tombstones were removed around 1905 and the ground was used for market gardening.

== Notable people ==
- Charles Annable (1905–1957) English professional rugby league footballer; his birth was registered in Alverthorpe
- R M A Kingswell (1909–1992), English rugby union official and president of the Rugby Football Union was from Alverthorpe
- Paul Sykes (1946–2007), British heavyweight boxer, weightlifter, writer, prisoner and debt collector, buried in Alverthorpe
- Harry Willcock (1896–1952), born in Alverthorpe, British Liberal activist and the last person in the UK to be prosecuted for refusing to produce an identity card

== See also ==
- Alverthorpe railway station
- Listed buildings in Wrenthorpe and Outwood West
