= Edward Parsons (minister) =

Congregational minister

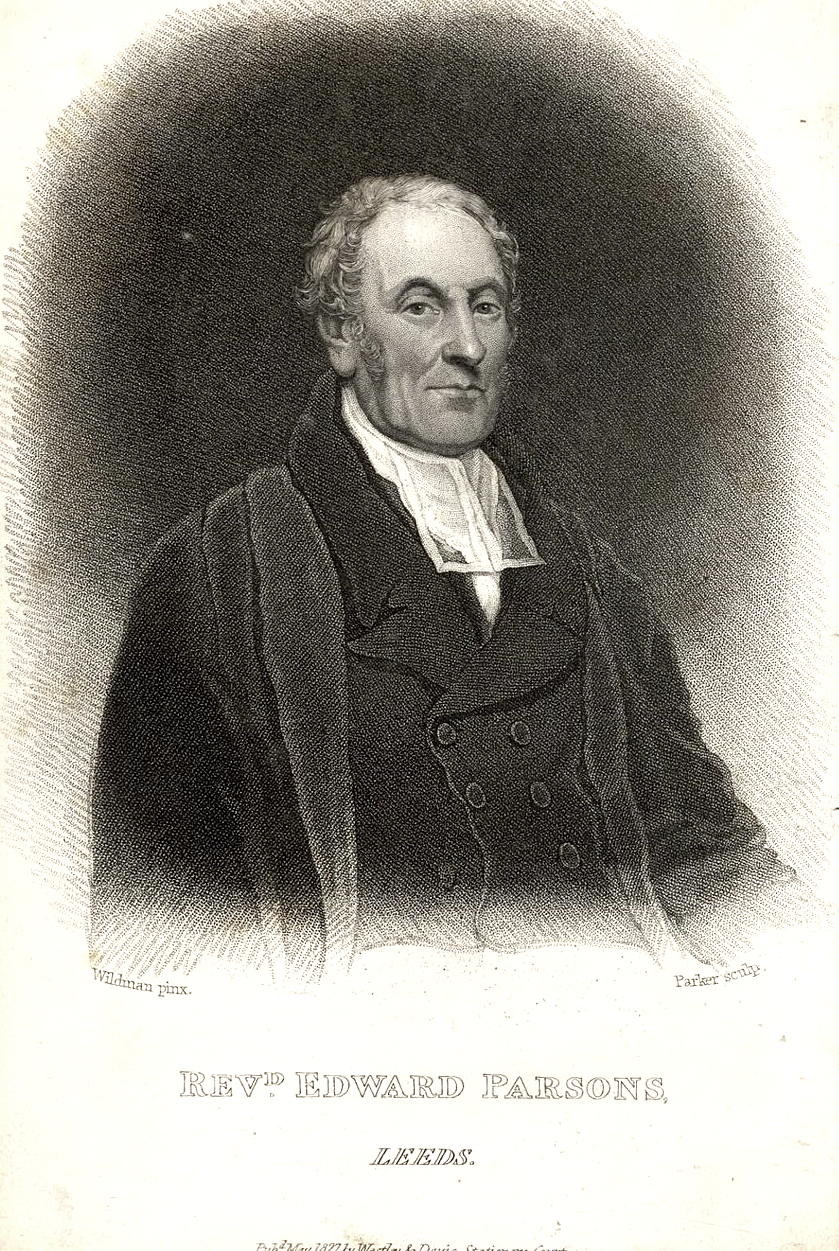
Edward Parsons, 1827 engraving

Edward Parsons (1762–1833) was an English Congregational minister and writer.

== Life ==
From an Irish background, he was born in Stepney on 16 July 1762. Backed by Selina Hastings, Countess of Huntingdon, he became one of the early students of Trevecca College. On leaving the college he went to Tunbridge Wells to minister in Lady Huntingdon's Connexion, and then to Norwich, where his health failed under stress of work.

After a brief ministry at Bristol, Parsons went to Wigan at the Countess's request, and drew a good congregation there. He spent 1781 at the St Saviourgate chapel in York. Early in 1784 he went to London to take charge of the chapel in Mulberry Gardens, Wapping, but shortly afterwards he leftLady Huntingdon's Connexion.

Joining the Congregationalists, Parsons preached for some months at the independent church in Cannon Street, Manchester; and then became assistant at the White Chapel, Leeds. On 17 February 1785 the minister, John Edwards, died, and Parsons succeeded him. The White Chapel, though several times enlarged, became too small for the congregation, and the new Salem Chapel was built in 1791. From 1786 Parsons preached annually for forty years at Tottenham Court Chapel.

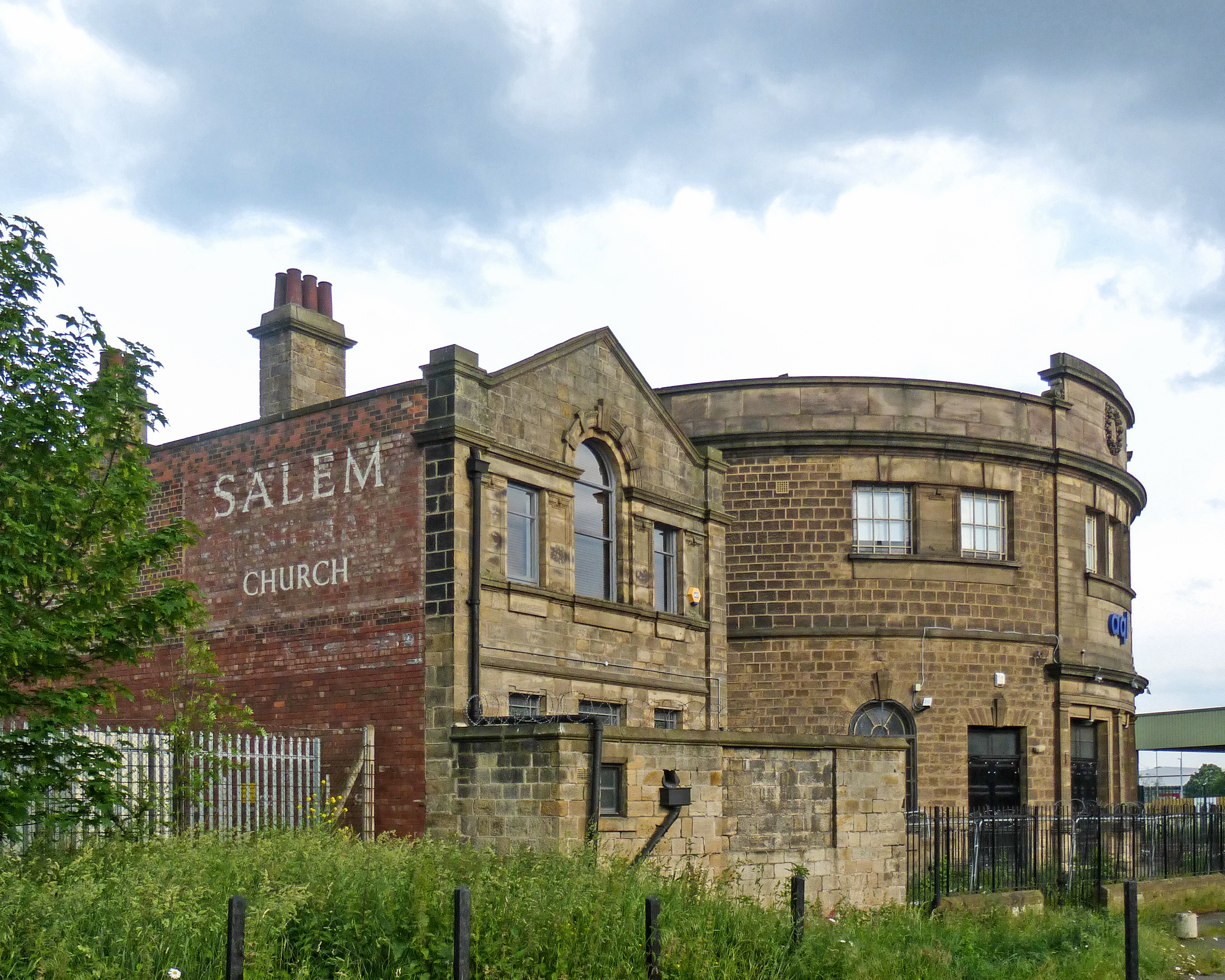
Salem Chapel, Leeds, 2014 photograph

In 1795 Parsons took a major part in the establishment of the London Missionary Society, of which he was a director for some years. In August 1813 he assisted in organising an auxiliary of the society at Leeds for the West Riding of Yorkshire. He was one of the trustees of the Evangelical Magazine from its beginning, in 1793, till his death. In 1832 he resigned his post at Leeds, but still occasionally preached in London. He died at Douglas, Isle of Man, on 29 July 1833.

== Works ==
Parsons was popular as a preacher, and published many separate sermons. Among tracts which he issued between 1791 and 1832 are:

- Under the pseudonym "Vindex", A Letter to the Author of a Candid Inquiry [into the Democratic Schemes of the Dissenters], Leeds, 1801; 2nd edit., entitled A Vindication of the Dissenters against the Charge of Democratic Scheming. It was replied to by "The Inquirer" in The Guilt of Democratic Scheming fully proved against the Dissenters, Bradford, 1802. Parsons retorted in an Appendix to his Vindication, and stated "The Inquirer" to be William Atkinson of Bradford.
- On Self-Possession in Preaching, London, 1832.
- Tracts for Infant Churches, London, 1832.

He also edited:

- The works of Philip Doddridge, Leeds, 1802–5, 1811, and of Jonathan Edwards, Leeds, 1806 (with Edward Williams;
- David Simpson's A Plea for the Deity of Jesus, London, 1812, with a memoir of the author, and a preface entitled The Spirit of Modern Socinianism exemplified;
- The works of Stephen Charnock, London, 1815; and
- With Thomas Scales and Richard Winter Hamilton, A Selection of Hymns … for the Use of the Protestant Dissenting Congregations of the Independent Order,’ Leeds, 1822, 1835.

Parsons abridged Daniel Neal's History of the Puritans, London, 1812.

== Family ==
Parsons was twice married. By his second wife, a daughter of James Hamilton, M.D. (1740–1827), of Dunbar, and of Winterfield Hall, Belhaven, he had a large family, including Edward Parsons (1797–1844), the eldest son, and James Parsons (1799–1877), both ministers.
