= Trinity Church, Ossett =

Church in Ossett, West Yorkshire, England

Trinity Church
- Church of the Holy and Undivided Trinity
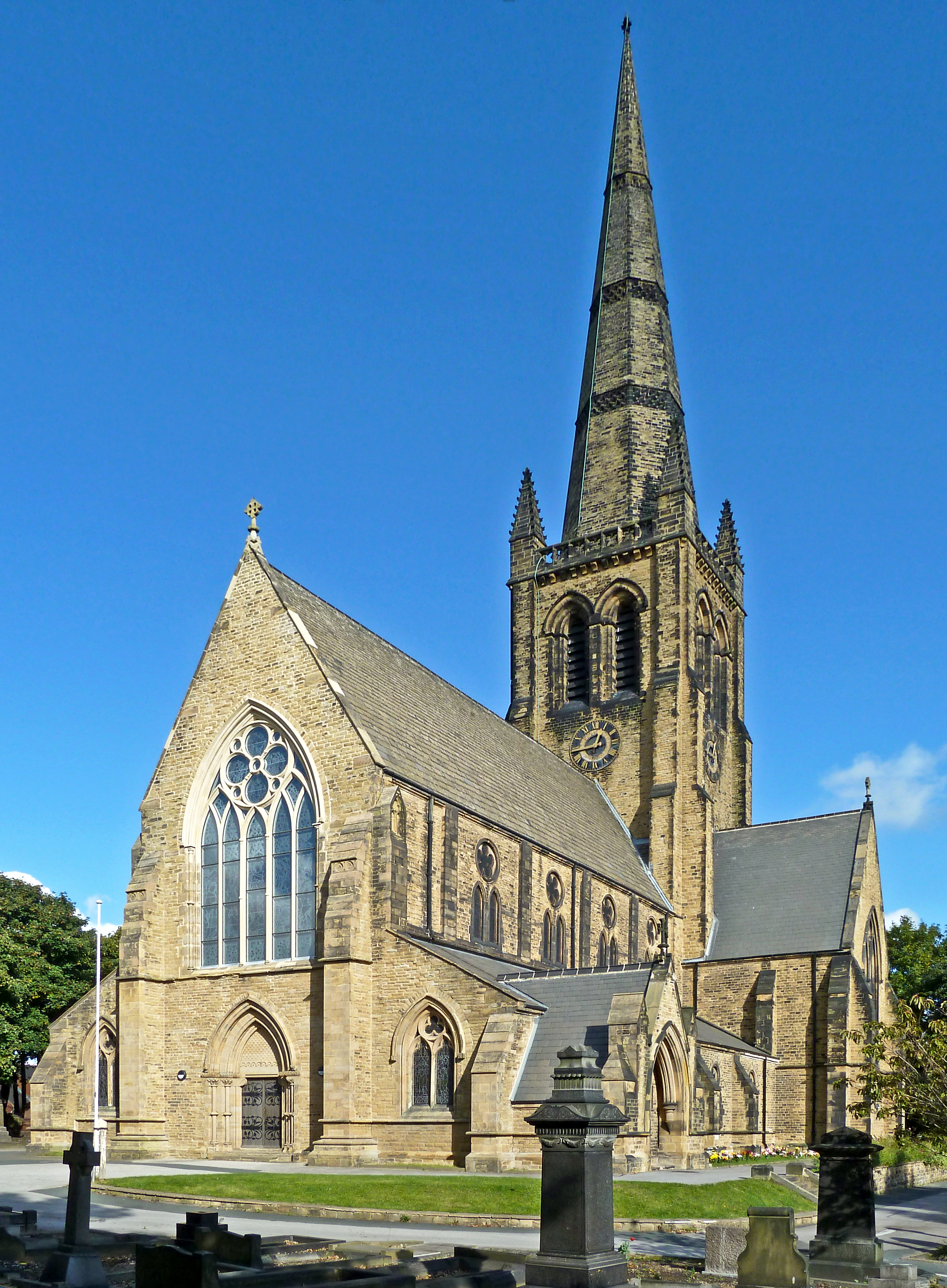
- Trinity Church from the south-west (October 2012)

- Location in West Yorkshire
- 53.68609°N 1.58270°W
- Location: Ossett, West Yorkshire, England
- Denomination: Church of England

History
- Dedication: Holy Trinity
- Dedicated: 14 July 1865

Architecture
- Heritage designation: Grade II*
- Designated: 6 May 1988
- Architect: William Henry Crossland
- Style: Gothic Revival
- Years built: 1862-1865
- Construction cost: £20,000 (1865)

Specifications
- Length: 145 ft (44 m)

Administration
- Province: York
- Diocese: Leeds
- Archdeaconry: Pontefract
- Deanery: Wakefield
- Parish: Ossett-cum-Gawthorpe

The Church of the Holy and Undivided Trinity, more commonly known as Trinity Church, is the main Church of England parish church for the market town of Ossett, West Yorkshire, England. Located on plateau some 300 feet (91 m) above sea level, the church's 226 feet (69 m) high spire is a local landmark, making the church amongst the tallest in the country. Built from 1862 to 1865 in the Gothic Revival style, the church has been designated a Grade II* listed building since 1988 by Historic England.

== History ==
During the late 1850s, it was realised that the then present church, at that time located in the market place in the town centre, was too small for the growing population of Ossett and that a new site would have to be found. The church at that time was a small building dating from 1806, replacing an older chapel founded in 1409.

In 1862, Benjamin Ingham donated £1,000 (equivalent to £59,100 in 2017) towards the cost of a new church better suited to the town. Due to space constraints at the market place site, the new church was to be laid out on a new site adjoining a recently opened cemetery on the northern outskirts of the town. The architect put in charge of designing the new building was William Henry Crossland of Halifax. Crossland was a pupil of Sir George Gilbert Scott, whose influences can be seen in the present building.

The foundation stone was laid by the vicar, Rev. Thomas Lee, on 30 June 1862. The cost of building the church was initially estimated at £8,000 (equivalent to £473,000 in 2017), but due to alterations and additions, the final cost was actually in excess of £20,000 (equivalent to £1.1 million in 2017). Construction took three years and the final stone was laid atop the spire in May 1865, again by Lee. The new church was consecrated by Robert Bickersteth, Bishop of Ripon, on 14 July 1865. The old church was demolished the following year.

In more recent years, the church has had several restorations, most notably at the turn of the 21st century thanks to a £190,000 grant from English Heritage. This grant enabled the replacement of the roof slates and the removal of the building from the 'Heritage at risk' register in 2003. Subsequent grants of £15,000 have enabled restoration of the large west and east windows with new tracery and restored stained glass.

== Architecture ==
=== Exterior ===
Described by Nikolaus Pevsner as a "large and impressive church", the building is cruciform in layout with nave, transepts, central tower and chancel. The nave is formed of five bays with lean-to aisles and south porch, stepped buttresses separating each bay. The nave aisles have small, paired lancets and cinque-foiled circles for windows, the clerestory above formed of larger versions of the same, except the westernmost bay which is blind. The west facade is formed of a large five-light window with a four-spoked circle window at the top. Below the west window is the west door, the tympanum above the door is decorated with rows of fish-scale carvings.

The transepts, formed of one bay each, are lit by large four-light windows in their gable ends, a corner buttress rising from the aisle roofs midway along the length of the transept. Each transept gable has two corner buttresses. The chancel, formed of two bays, is accompanied by lean-to aisles of one bay length each, and is lit by a large and decorative 5-light window, similar in design to that of the west window, featuring a sexfoil circle window at its head.

The arms of the church are topped by steep slate-covered roofs, that of the nave being higher than the transepts or chancel. The tower rises from the meeting of these roofs, formed of three stages. The tower has angle buttresses on all four corners, rising to crocketed pinnacles above a pierced, bracketed parapet. The lower stage of the tower is lit on the north, east and south faces by simple twin windows either side, that of the west side being blocked by the nave roof. A stair turret rises from the north chancel aisle to the lower stage of the tower. The second stage of the tower contains a clock face on all four faces, centred around a small circular window. The upper or belfry stage contains paired louvred bell openings. Above the tower is a tall, octagonal stone spire with three pierced bands of ashlar. The building is designed with Decorated Gothic influences.

=== Interior ===
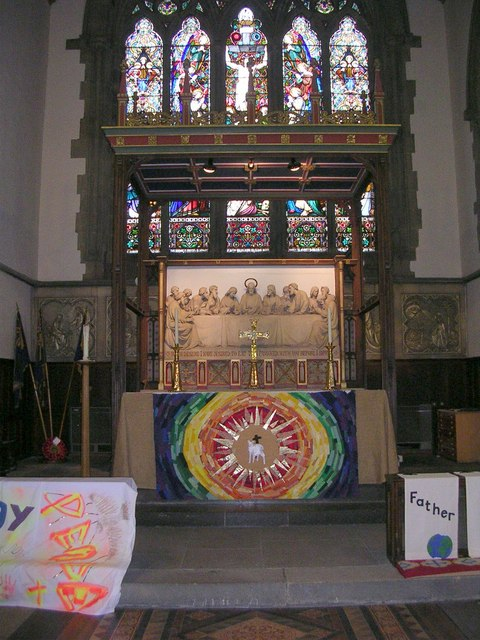
Altar

The nave has alternate red and grey granite piers, rising to elaborate capitals cared with figure-heads and foliage. The clerestory above is marked by colonettes forming an arcade. The nave aisles are simple, sparsely decorated and of the lean-to type, with windows depicting events from the Old Testament (south aisle) and New Testament (north aisle).

The crossing tower sits on four massive piers, each with an additional red granite colonette in their corners. Above the tower arch in the nave is a large empty space, formerly filled by a wall painting, removed or white-washed over at an unknown date. Above the nave is a tall wooden roof, scissor braced on the wall of the tower.

The interior contains stained glass windows throughout except in the nave clerestory, which is clear glass. The east and west windows were made by O'Connor of London, the west window depicting the Resurrection and funded by Ingham; the east window depicting the Crucifixion, funded by the Whitaker family of Ossett. Clayton and Bell manufactured the north transept window, which shows the Annunciation, as well as the western most nave aisle windows.

The church has various fittings and memorials, include a royal coat of arms above the west door, brought from the 1806 church, an octagonal pulpit adorned with images of the Four Evangelists, an 18th century circular font, also brought from the old church and a reredos depicting the Last Supper. The organ, located over two cases in the north transept, was originally constructed by Isaac Abbott of Leeds in 1886 and rebuilt by Abbott & Smith in 1927, replacing the organ from the previous church which was initially transferred to the new building. The organ was further restored from 1987 to 1988 by T. J. Jackson. The organ has three manuals and forty stops.

=== Materials ===
The exterior is constructed mostly from Yorkshire stone, with new lighter stone for the recently restored window tracery and Welsh slate for the roofs. The spire uses three bands of ashlar as part of its construction. The nave arcade shafts are made from red and blue polished Aberdeen granite, with Caen stone used for the font.

=== Dimensions ===
- Length: 145 feet (44 m)
- Width: 56 feet (17 m)
- Height of nave roof ridge: 67 feet (20 m)
- Height of tower: 110 feet (34 m)
- Height of spire: 116 feet (35 m)
- Total height of tower and spire: 226 feet (69 m)
- Area: 965 square metres (10,390 sq ft)

== Bells ==
Until 1865, the tower of the new church was empty, when Ingham gave £800 for the casting of a new, heavy ring of eight bells. These bells were cast at John Taylor & Co of Loughborough, Leicestershire in 1865, the tenor weighed 26 and a half long cwt (1,350 kg). The bells arrived in Ossett in June 1865, travelling by rail from Loughborough to Flushdyke and then by road to Ossett. The first peal on the bells and in Ossett was on 10 November 1866. By 1889, the heaviest two bells were unringable, so they were rehung on new bearings by James Shaw. The bells were hung in a large timber frame, made concurrent with the casting of the bells.

In 1934, the bells and fittings were transported back to Taylor's foundry in Loughborough, where in the intervening 70 years, great strides had been made in the casting and tuning of church bells. As such, the 1865 peal were now considered to be tonally poor, and were recast, with additional metal, to make a new peal of ten. The bells were hung in the original timber frame from 1865, with a new oak extension made to carry the additional bells. The bells were dedicated on 22 December 1934, by James Seaton, Bishop of Wakefield. The first peal on the bells was on 2 November 1935, comprising 5,165 changes of Grandsire Caters in 3h 33m.

This ring of ten was augmented to twelve in 1987 with two new treble bells cast by Taylor's, plus an additional thirteenth bell, a sharp second, to allow for a true ring of eight without using the heaviest bells. The four trebles of the ring of twelve were hung in a new cast iron frame, made by Taylor's in 1987 to extend the original oak frame.

The ring of twelve was augmented to a ring of fourteen in 2012 by casting a further two treble bells, again by Taylor's, to make only Britain's second diatonic ring of fourteen bells, after Winchester Cathedral, which were augmented to fourteen in 1992. To fit the extra bells in, the tenor was moved and rehung in a new cast iron frame, the two new treble bells were then inserted in the space formerly occupied by the tenor, also in a new cast iron frame. The money for the augmentation, £42,000, was given by an anonymous donor, whose identity remains unknown.

In 2016, the ring of fourteen was augmented again to become the only diatonic ring of fifteen in the world with the new bell cast by Taylor's. This bell was hung in the 2012 extension frame. The tower thus contains sixteen bells; a diatonic ring of fifteen and a fifth sharp, giving the band two lighter rings of eight and one lighter ring of ten in addition to the heaviest eight and ten bells. There are only five other towers in the world with sixteen or more change ringing bells, which are Christ Church Cathedral, Dublin, Ireland; St Martin in the Bullring, Birmingham; Winchester Cathedral; Worcester Cathedral and the Swan Tower in Perth, Australia. The tenor bell at Ossett weighs 27 long cwt 1 qr 25 lbs (3,077 lb or 1,396 kg), striking the note 'D'.
