= Silcoates School =

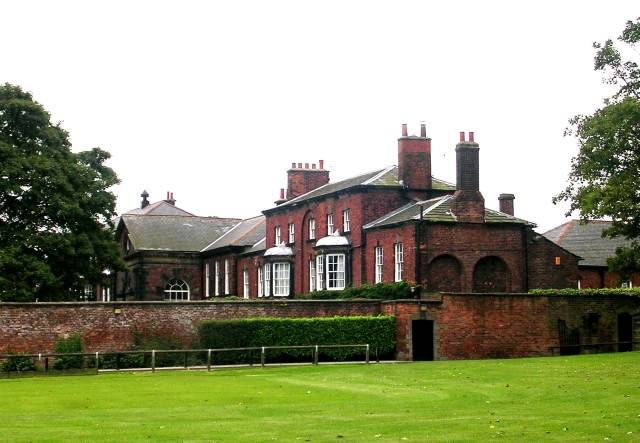
- Silcoates viewed in the direction of the Headmaster's House, formerly Silcoates Hall

Location
- Wrenthorpe Lane; Wakefield, West Yorkshire, WF2 OPD; England
- 53°41′41″N 1°31′48″W

Information
- Motto: Clarior ex Ignibus; A light forged in flames
- Religious affiliation: United Reformed Church (Previously Congregationalist)
- Established: 1820; 206 years ago
- Founder: Reverend Thomas Scales
- Department for Education URN: 108303 Tables
- Headmaster: Mr Chris Wainman (from September 2021)
- Gender: Mixed
- Age: 3 to 18
- Houses: Evans', Moore's, Spencer's, Yonge's
- Colours: Yellow; Green; Blue; Red
- Publication: The Silcoatian
- Website: www.silcoates.org.uk

Silcoates School is a co-educational independent school in the village of Wrenthorpe near Wakefield, England.

== History ==
The school was founded in 1820 as the Northern Congregational School at Silcoates House, for the board and education of the sons of Nonconformist clergy, and was situated close to Ossett and Horbury, each of which had unusually large Nonconformist populations. It was a boys' boarding school until 1995, receiving pupils from around the world. Girls were admitted into the sixth form from 1976, with female boarders accommodated in the Coach House. The school now exists as a co-educational day school with a campus on the border between the villages of Wrenthorpe and Alverthorpe.

Silcoates School is made up of three separate, but closely linked, sections: a Senior School for boys and girls aged 11 to 19 (Year 7 to the Upper Sixth Form); a Junior School for boys and girls aged 4 to 11 (Year 1 to Year 6); and Pre-School for boys and girls aged 2 to 4.

== Motto ==
The school's motto is "Clarior ex Ignibus" (brighter through the flames), commemorating a fire of 1904 which caused the school to move into temporary exile in Saltburn, on the coast of North Yorkshire between Whitby and Middlesbrough.

== Houses ==
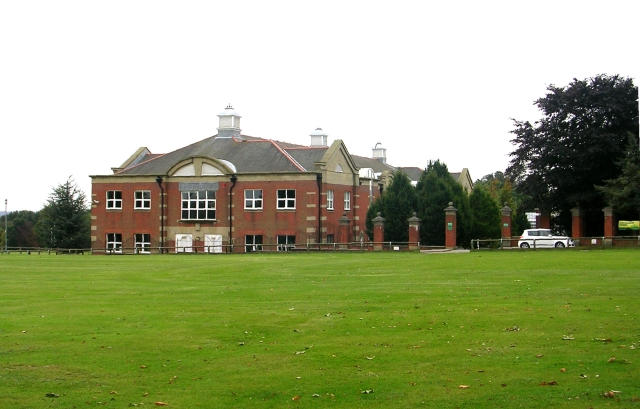
Silcoates School

There are four houses representing significant headmasters:

- Evans' (Yellow and green tie)
- Spencer's (Blue and green tie)
- Moore's (Light green and green tie)
- Yonge's (Red and green tie)

== Curriculum ==
The majority of pupils usually take a minimum of 9 GCSEs, and 4 AS and 3 A2-Levels in the Sixth Form, with many progressing on to degree level courses. There is a wide and varied selection of subjects to choose from at GCSE and A Level, including some specialist and vocational programmes.

== Notable former staff and pupils ==
- Imran Ahmad Khan (born 1973), Member of Parliament (MP) for Wakefield (December 2019-May 2022); suspended and resigned; convicted child sex offender.
- Hugh Banton (1949), Progressive rock icon, member of Van der Graaf Generator
- Andrew Burt (1945–2018), Actor
- George Entwistle (born 1962), Former Director General of the BBC
- J. S. Fletcher (1865–1935), historian, writer of historical and detective novels
- Josh Holling (born 1996), cricketer
- John Horam (born 1939), Conservative Party Member of Parliament (MP) for Orpington
- Karim Ahmad Khan (born 1970), Prosecutor of the International Criminal Court
- Richard O'Dwyer (born 1988), Creator of TVShack.net
- Sir William Peel (1875–1945), colonial governor of Hong Kong
- Sir Henry Norman Rae (1860–1928) Liberal MP for Shipley
- James Guinness Rogers (1822–1911), Nonconformist divine
- Oliver Rowland (born 1992), British racing driver
- Thomas Scales was chaplain and secretary at the school in 1850.
- William Thomas Stead (1849–1912), journalist, campaigner, victim of RMS Titanic disaster
- David Stiff (born 1984), County Cricketer
- Tim Stimpson (born 1973), International rugby player
- Theodore Taylor (1850–1952), Businessman, Liberal politician, Profit-sharing pioneer
- Maurice Yonge (1899–1986), zoologist
- Edwin Lawrence Godkin (1831-1902), American journalist and newspaper editor

== See also ==
- Listed buildings in Wrenthorpe and Outwood West
