= Listed buildings in Wrenthorpe and Outwood West =

Wrenthorpe and Outwood West is a former ward in the metropolitan borough of the City of Wakefield, West Yorkshire, England. It contains five listed buildings that are recorded in the National Heritage List for England. All the listed buildings are designated at Grade II, the lowest of the three grades, which is applied to "buildings of national importance and special interest". The former ward includes the village of Wrenthorpe, parts of Outwood, and Alverthorpe, and the surrounding area. The listed buildings consist of houses, and house and school, and a church.

== Buildings ==
Name and location	Photograph	Date	Notes
Red Hall; 53.69791°N 1.50964°W		Late 17th century	A former manor house that has been extended and much altered, it is in red brick, with stone dressings, a stone slate roof, and two storeys. The original part has two bays, to the left is a gabled cross-wing with a later addition to the front, and to the right is a two-bay extension. On the front is an arcade of three round arches on square piers with keystones. Within the arcade are two mullioned windows and an entrance, and above it is a band and a shield. In the left cross-wing are early window openings, and elsewhere most of the windows have been altered.
Silcoates House and School; 53.69492°N 1.53006°W		c. 1748	The school was added to the house in the 1870s, it was largely rebuilt in 1907 after a fire, and there have been later additions. The house is in brick with stone dressings, moulded gutter brackets, and a hipped Welsh slate roof. There are three storeys and three bays, and two-storey two-bay side wings. In the centre bay is a recessed round-arch containing a round-arched doorway with Tuscan engaged colonnettes, a frieze, and a dentilled triangular pediment. The outer bays contain two-storey canted bay windows with domed roofs, and the windows are sashes. The school to the left has a range of two storeys and seven bays, and contains a giant pedimented projecting wing with a Venetian window flanked by paired Ionic pilasters, and an oculus in the tympanum. Beyond this are further ranges.
St Paul's Church, Alverthorpe; 53.69222°N 1.53174°W		1823–25	The church is in sandstone with a slate roof and crested ridge tiles. It consists of a wide nave, a small chancel, a vestry, and a west tower. The tower has three stages, angle buttresses, a west porch with a Tudor arched doorway, a five-light west window, and an embattled parapet on machicolations. The chancel has a four-light east window, angle buttresses, and turrets with pinnacles.
Melbourne House; 53.70910°N 1.52886°W		1856–57	Built by John Wroe, founder of the Christian Israelite Church, and nicknamed "Prophet Wroe's Mansion"; now a nursing home. The building is in stone, with sill bands, a moulded eaves cornice, and a deep parapet. There are two storeys and a symmetrical front of seven bays, and four bays in the right return. On the corners and flanking the middle bay are giant Ionic pilasters. In the centre is a recessed distyle Ionic portico, and there is a similar portico in the right return. The windows are sashes in raised surrounds.
1–7 Railway Terrace, Outwood; 53.71510°N 1.50889°W		1870s (probable)	A terrace of seven brick houses with Welsh slate roofs. There are two storeys and each house has two bays. The middle house projects slightly under a gable, the other houses have half-hipped roofs, and all have decorative bargeboards. The doorways have fanlights, the windows are sashes, and all the openings have arches in polychromatic brickwork. Each return contains three small stair windows.
