= Adam Beaumont =

British businessman, investor and trustee

- Born: August 1972 (age 54); Stockport, Greater Manchester, England
- Education: University of Leeds
- Occupations: Founder and CEO of aql CEO of BlueWave Communications; Founder of NorthInvest
- Years active: 1998–present
- Title: Professor
- Partner: Not Known

Professor Adam Beaumont DL (born August 1972) is an English businessman, angel investor, trustee and digital entrepreneur. He is the CEO of telecommunications provider aql, a visiting professor of cyber security at the University of Leeds and the Honorary Consul of the Republic of Estonia to the Northern Powerhouse and the Isle of Man.

== Early life and education ==
Beaumont was state educated. He was born in Stockport, England.

He has a PhD in physical chemistry and a BSc in colour and polymer chemistry from the University of Leeds.

== Career ==
After completing his PhD, Beaumont began his career at age 24 with a three-year stint as the University of Leeds' youngest lecturer in physical chemistry, including quantum mechanics and thermodynamics.

He then spent some time in secure mobile communications for the Defence Evaluation Research Agency (DERA), an agency of the Ministry of Defence. Beaumont was involved in building the agency's first cyber teams.

Beaumont founded telecommunications platform company aql in 1998, and is the company's CEO. aql has provided £1m of support for Parkrun.

In 2008, he purchased the Salem Chapel, a 1791 Grade II listed building in Leeds and restored it. The restored chapel houses aql's head office, and has hosted the launch of government initiatives, including the Northern Powerhouse concept and the first Northern Powerhouse Partnership report.

He is a founder and board member of IXLeeds, an independent internet exchange outside London. He has also founded ManxIX, an internet exchange on the Isle of Man.

In 2015, Beaumont founded the not-for-profit investment platform NorthInvest. As an angel investor, he invests between £20,000 and £400,000 in early-stage tech companies, including CBiS Education, Deekit, ID Health, Memento VR, Gravity Industries, handi, jet-drone company Hydra, artificial diamond innovator Dyman, and satellite startup Kappazeta. NorthInvest raised over £2 million for startups in Q1 2020 and over £22 million throughout that year. More recently, he co-founded and became a trustee of Leeds International Aid, whose aims are to provide assistance to victims of war or natural disasters.

After aql acquired Isle of Man-based communications provider BlueWave Communications in 2015, Beaumont became the company's CEO. BlueWave operates the island's Starlink ground station.

Beaumont is active internationally, leading the founding delegation to create UK TechLink. More recently, he led a delegation of northern business leaders on an April 2017 trade mission to San Francisco as part of the government's Northern Powerhouse initiative.

In January 2018, he helped launch Transport for the North's Strategic Transport Plan to transform transportation in the North of England over the next 30 years.

== Honours and other endeavours ==
Beaumont was appointed a visiting professor of cyber security at the University of Leeds in October 2017. He is also a governor of Leeds City College. He is a patron of Leeds Community Foundation and the major supporter of Child friendly Leeds.

In June 2017, Beaumont was appointed as a Trustee of the Eden Project. He was also a Non Executive Director of the Eden Project International Board, the team responsible for initiating Eden projects in China, Ireland, Dubai, US. Latterly he became a notable donor to Eden (£320k) via his company aql. He was a key driver of Eden Project North until his resignation as a Trustee, alleging a lack of confidence in members of the Eden Executive and Trustee team.

Beaumont was named International Director of the Year 2017 for Yorkshire and the North East by the Institute of Directors. He was named Director of the Year for Innovation in 2018. He was named International Director of the Year in 2019. He was named as a Maserati 100 Entrepreneur in 2019.

He was appointed to the board of the Leeds City Region Enterprise Partnership (LEP) in 2017.

He was named Honorary Consul of the Republic of Estonia to the Northern Powerhouse and the Isle of Man in April 2018.

Beaumont joined the UK5G Advisory Board in March 2018. His mobile network BlueWave received permissions to operate 5G in the Isle of Man

A regular keynote speaker on topics including cyber security and mobile security, Beaumont delivered the opening address at the Huddersfield leg of the Duke of York's prestigious Pitch@Palace entrepreneurship competition in February 2018. In April, he gave two talks at CYBERUK 2018, the National Cyber Security Centre's (NCSC) annual flagship conference. In 2022, he addressed the Global Air and Space Chiefs Conference.

He is part of Leeds City Region's team that successfully bid on a place on Massachusetts Institute of Technology's (MIT) two-year Regional Entrepreneurship Acceleration Programme (REAP). Beaumont and the team are now alumni of the programme.

In 2018 he created and funded the "Beaumont Awards" – an award for outstanding final year research which has the potential to positively impact society, inspired by the achievements in research-led public education by Michael Faraday.

He was made a Deputy Lieutenant of the West Yorkshire Lieutenancy in 2023. He is also an Honorary Group Captain in the RAF serving as a Royal Auxiliary in the City of London 601 Squadron.
