= Aql (company) =

British telecommunications company

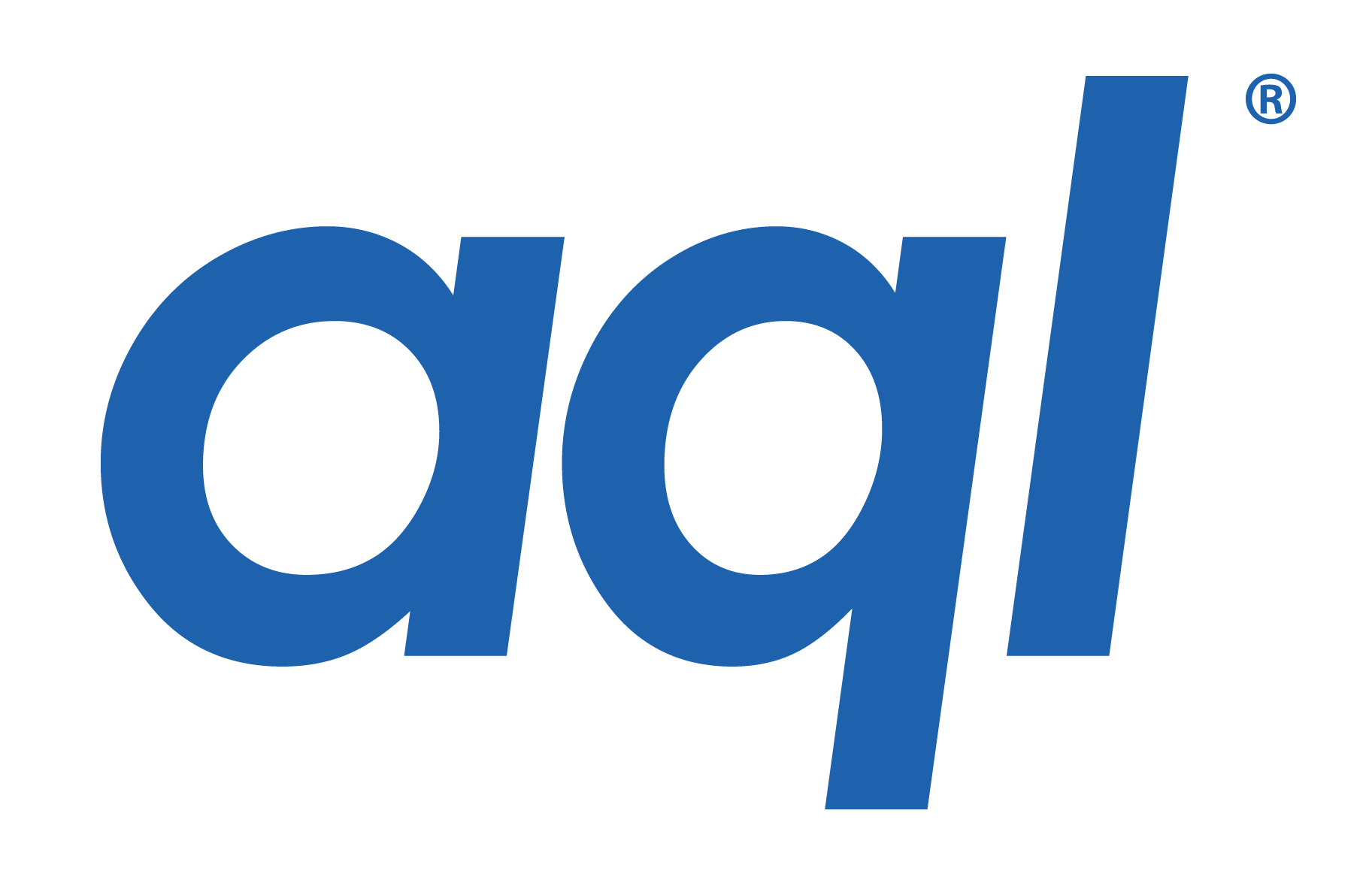
- Type: Private
- Industry: Telecommunications
- Founded: 1998
- Founder: Professor Adam Beaumont
- Headquarters: Hunslet, Leeds, West Yorkshire, England
- Key people: CEO; Professor Adam Beaumont

aql is a telecommunications company based in Leeds, UK. It is principally known for operating carrier neutral data centres, and for providing services relating to colocation, mobile messaging, VoIP telephony, and secure 4G/5G mobile connectivity for the internet of things (IoT).

The company's head office is located at the historic Salem Chapel in Hunslet, Leeds.

== Company history ==
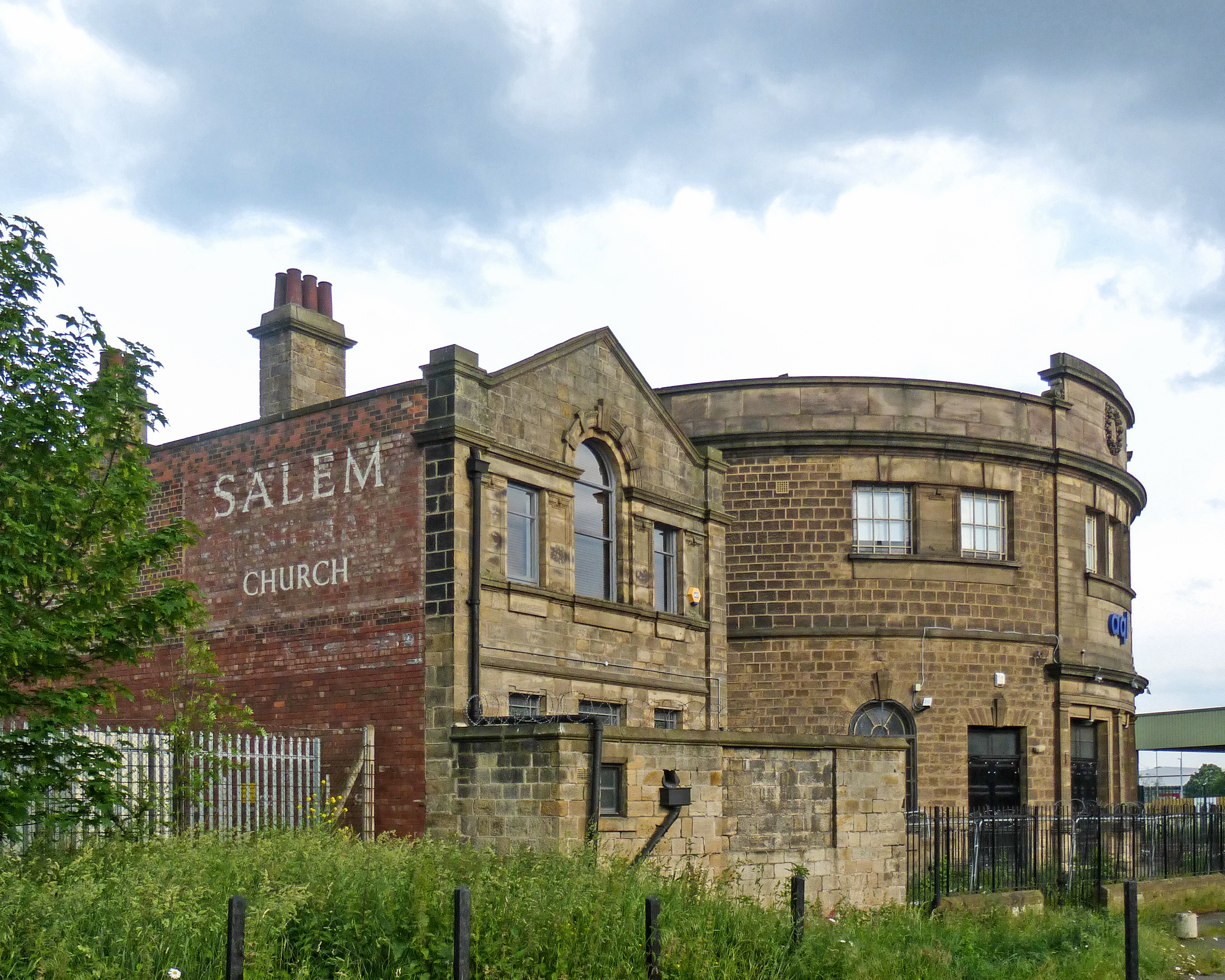
aql head office, Salem Chapel, Leeds

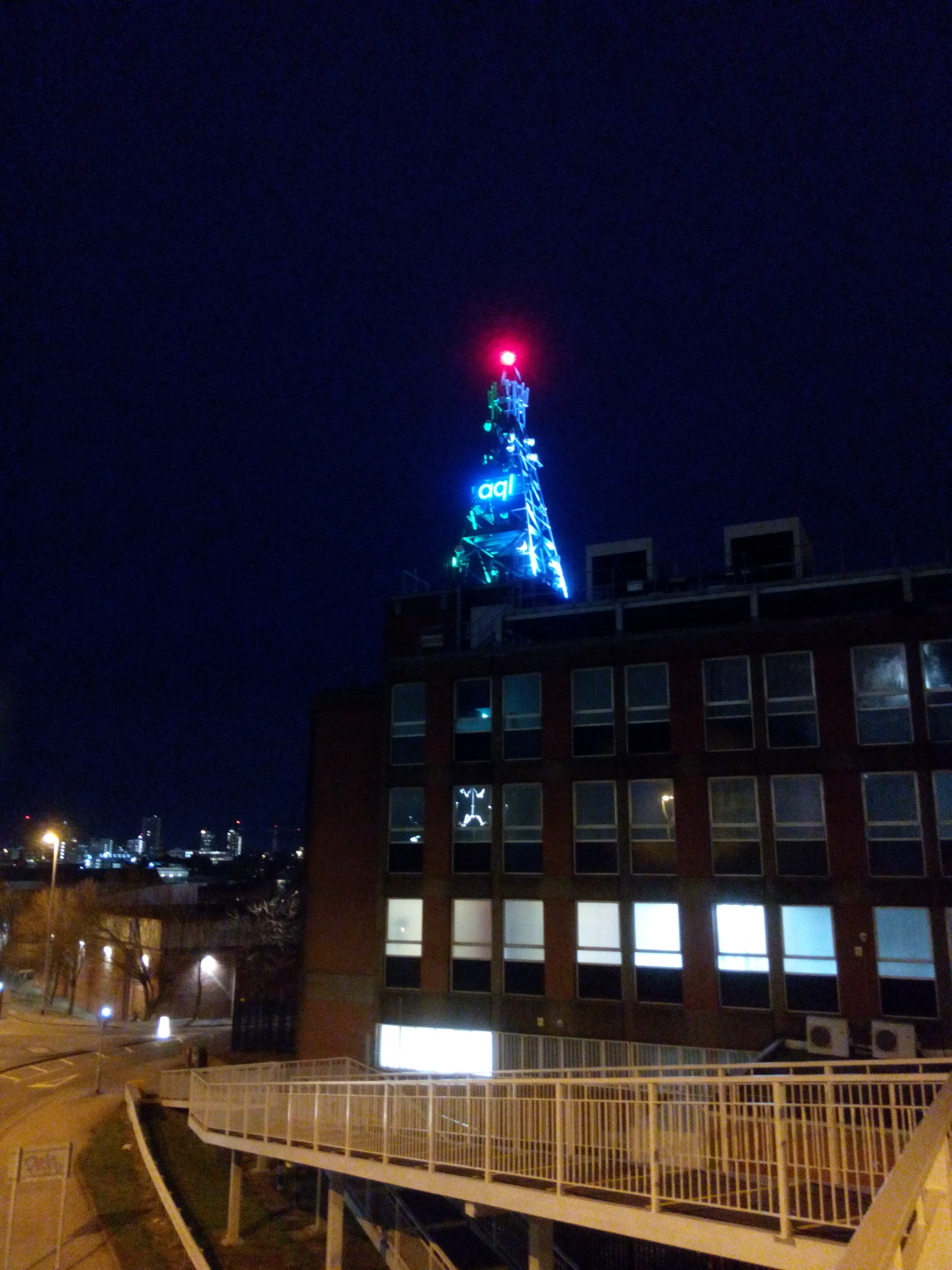
A mast in Hunslet, Leeds, in 2018, broadcasting internet optically from one of aql's Leeds data centres to the Greenhouse block of flats.

aql was founded in 1998 by former University of Leeds lecturer and Ministry of Defence communications specialist Professor Adam Beaumont as a domain name registrar and email and web hosting company.

By 2003, aql had expanded into wholesale telecommunications, supplying UK phone numbers to the broadband industry to support IP telephony/VoIP services, providing mobile messaging services and supplying wholesale messaging platforms to international and UK networks. The company is responsible for more than 94 million numbers on 42 different telecoms networks. It also hosts 40 million UK numbers for voice services.

Beaumont purchased Salem Chapel in 2009. The Grade II listed building was renovated and restored to house aql's head office, including two data centres, an exhibition space and a conference facility.

The firm had a turnover of £7 million and employed around 40 people in 2013.

Also in 2013, aql announced plans to invest £43 million to build a data centre on the former site of Yorkshire Chemicals in Hunslet, Leeds.

The company acquired a 57,000 sq ft former council building located at South Point, Leeds for around half a million pounds in 2015. The company announced plans to convert the site into another data centre.

In September 2015, aql purchased Isle of Man-based BlueWave Communications following the death of its founder, former The Apprentice contestant Stuart Baggs.

In March 2017, aql won the contract to serve the UK's universities, colleges and teaching hospitals with secure data storage via a framework contract operated by Jisc.

aql unveiled its first autonomous vehicle in April 2018, and announced a consortium of partners, including Gulf Oil, the University of Leeds, Leeds and Bradford city councils, Citu and CitiPark, to trial the vehicles in Leeds.

== IXLeeds ==
Since 2011, one of aql's Salem Chapel data centres has housed the Leeds internet exchange, IXLeeds. IXLeeds is the UK's only fully independent internet exchange outside London. Beaumont co-founded the exchange, and serves as company secretary.

== Leeds' WiFi telephone boxes ==
In 2013, aql reconditioned 24 Giles Gilbert Scott-designed red telephone boxes. The boxes were painted blue, converted into solar-powered free WiFi access points, and placed around Leeds city centre.

The boxes are known as Leeds Electronic Ordnance and Digital Information System, or LEODIS, after the old English name for the city of Leeds.

In July 2017, aql announced that the initiative had seen 100,000 unique users since its introduction.

== Sponsorship and local support ==
In May 2017, aql was announced as the Communications Sponsor for Lendy Cowes Week 2017. In addition to sponsoring the event, aql competed in the 50-nautical mile race around the Isle of Wight. CEO Adam Beaumont was joined at the helm by blind sailor Lucy Hodges MBE. In June 2018 it was announced that aql had struck a 5-year deal to continue sponsoring the event.

Also in May 2017, aql was among the local companies to offer support and financial backing to Leeds' bid to become European Capital of Culture 2023.

Since 2000, aql has sponsored a live webcam overlooking Millennium Square, Leeds.

The company is a patron of Leeds Community Foundation.
