= List of tallest church buildings in the United Kingdom =

From the Middle Ages until the advent of the skyscraper, Christian church buildings were often the tallest buildings in the United Kingdom. Indeed, it was not until the building of the BT Tower in London in 1962 that St Paul's Cathedral was no longer the city's tallest structure.

The United Kingdom no longer features as prominently on the list of tallest churches worldwide, but in 1311, Lincoln Cathedral surpassed the Great Pyramid of Giza to become the world's tallest building. Salisbury Cathedral is the present tallest church building in the country, standing at a height of 123 metres (404 feet), and it remains amongst the tallest medieval churches in the world.

== Extant churches ==
Note: This list does not include church buildings which have been reduced in height, either through rebuilding or damage due to disaster. These buildings are incorporated into the list of tallest churches buildings. The height referred to in the table includes weathervanes etc on spires and pinnacles. Actual architectural height may be lower.

=== Churches 200 feet or taller ===
Rank	Name of Church	Height (m)	Height (ft)	Location	Notes	Image
1	Salisbury Cathedral	123	404	Salisbury, Wiltshire	Tallest church in the United Kingdom, amongst the tallest medieval churches in the world.	
2	St Paul's Cathedral	111	366	City of London	London's tallest structure from 1710 to 1962; previous tallest in London until Great Fire of London.	
3	Liverpool Anglican Cathedral	101	331	Liverpool	Tallest church in the United Kingdom without a dome or spire, amongst the tallest non-spired churches in the world. Largest church in the UK by area, longest Cathedral in the world.	
4	Norwich Cathedral	96	315	Norwich, Norfolk		
5	Preston, St Walburge	94	309	Preston, Lancashire	Tallest non-cathedral church in the United Kingdom, tallest Roman Catholic church in the country.	
6	Edinburgh, St Mary's Cathedral	90	295	Edinburgh	The tallest of the three Cathedrals in the UK with three spires. Tallest church in the UK outside of England.	
7	Louth, St James	89	293	Louth, Lincolnshire	Tallest Church of England parish church in the country. Architectural height of 288 feet.	
8	(Old) Coventry Cathedral	88	290	Coventry	Cathedral destroyed in the Coventry Blitz on November 14, 1940; only the tower and spire remain intact. New Cathedral built adjoining old. Architectural height 284 feet.	
9	Westminster Cathedral	87	284	London	Tallest Roman Catholic Cathedral in the country.	
10	Grantham, St Wulfram	87	283	Grantham, Lincolnshire	Architectural height 274 feet	
11	Warrington, St Elphin	86	281	Warrington, Lancashire		
12=	Liverpool Metropolitan Cathedral	85	278	Liverpool		
12=	Kensington, St Mary Abbots	85	278	Kensington, Greater London	Tallest parish church in London.	
14	Chichester Cathedral	84	277	Chichester, West Sussex		
15	St Mary Redcliffe	84	274	Bristol	Commonly misquoted as 292 feet high, which includes the deep foundations and substructure. Architectural height 262 feet.	
16	Lincoln Cathedral	83	272	Lincoln, Lincolnshire	Formerly tallest building the world from 1311 to 1549 when spire collapsed in a storm. Tallest medieval non-spired church in the country.	
17	Boston Stump	81	271	Boston, Lincolnshire	Architectural height 267 feet.	
18	Derry, St Eugene's Cathedral	78	256	Derry		
19	Kilburn, St Augustine	77	253	Kilburn, Greater London		
20	Lichfield Cathedral	77	252	Lichfield, Staffordshire	The only medieval cathedral in the United Kingdom with three spires.	
21	Truro Cathedral	76	249	Truro, Cornwall		
22	Wakefield Cathedral	75	247	Wakefield	Tallest church in Yorkshire.	
23	Hulme, St Mary	73	241	Hulme, Greater Manchester		
24=	Lancaster Cathedral	73	240	Lancaster		
24=	Salford Cathedral	73	240	Salford, Greater Manchester		
26=	Canterbury Cathedral	72	236	Canterbury		
26=	Newark-on-Trent, St Mary Magdalene	72	236	Newark-on-Trent, Nottinghamshire	Tallest church in Nottinghamshire. Architectural height 231 feet.	
26=	Coventry, Holy Trinity	72	236	Coventry	Tallest surviving church in Coventry.	
26=	Halifax, All Souls	72	236	Halifax, West Yorkshire		
30	York Minster	72	235	York	Largest medieval Cathedral in the United Kingdom.	
31	St Michael and All Angels, Mount Dinham, Exeter	71	233	Exeter	Tallest church in Devon.	
32	Chesterfield, St Mary and All Saints	70	230	Chesterfield, Derbyshire	Famous for its twisted spire.	
33=	Trinity Church, Ossett	69	226	Ossett, West Yorkshire		
33=	Westminster Abbey	69	225	London		
33=	Gloucester Cathedral	69	225	Gloucester		
33=	Glasgow, St Mungo's Cathedral	69	225	Glasgow		
36	Bath, St John	68	222	Bath		
37	Derry, St Columb's Cathedral	67	221	Derry		
38=	Leicester Cathedral	67	220	Leicester		
38=	Albion United Reformed Church	67	220	Ashton-under-Lyne		
40	Durham Cathedral	66	218	Durham	Largest surviving Romanesque cathedral in the United Kingdom.	
41	Ely Cathedral	66	217	Ely, Cambridgeshire	Known as the 'Ship of the Fens' due to its huge size above the surrounding flat marshes.	
42=	Bristol, Christ Church Clifton	65	212	Clifton, Bristol		
42=	Derby Cathedral	65	212	Derby		
42=	Church of Our Lady and the English Martyrs	65	212	Cambridge		
42=	Ashbourne, St Oswald	65	212	Ashbourne, Derbyshire		
46=	Oundle, St Peter	64	210	Oundle, Northamptonshire		
46=	Bottesford, St Mary the Virgin	64	210	Bottesford, Leicestershire		
46=	Armagh, St Patrick's Cathedral (Roman Catholic)	64	210	Armagh		
46=	Dorking, St Martin	64	210	Dorking, Surrey		View from the south east
49	South Dalton, St Mary	63	208	South Dalton, East Riding of Yorkshire		
50=	Plymouth Cathedral	62	205	Plymouth		
50=	St Mary's Cathedral, Glasgow	62	205	Glasgow		
52=	Worcester Cathedral	62	203	Worcester		
52=	Newcastle Cathedral	62	203	Newcastle-upon-Tyne	Architectural height 194 feet.	
54=	Southampton, St Mary	61	202	Southampton		
54=	Bournemouth, St Peter	61	202	Bournemouth		
54=	Spitalfields, Christ Church	61	202	Spitalfields, Greater London		
54=	Bodelwyddan, Marble Church	61	202	Bodelwyddan, Denbighshire		
54=	Birmingham, St Martin	61	202	Birmingham		
59=	St John the Divine, Kennington	61	200	London		
59=	Oxford, University Church of St Mary the Virgin	61	200	Oxford	Architectural height 191 feet.	
