= Arla Aylesbury =

British dairy

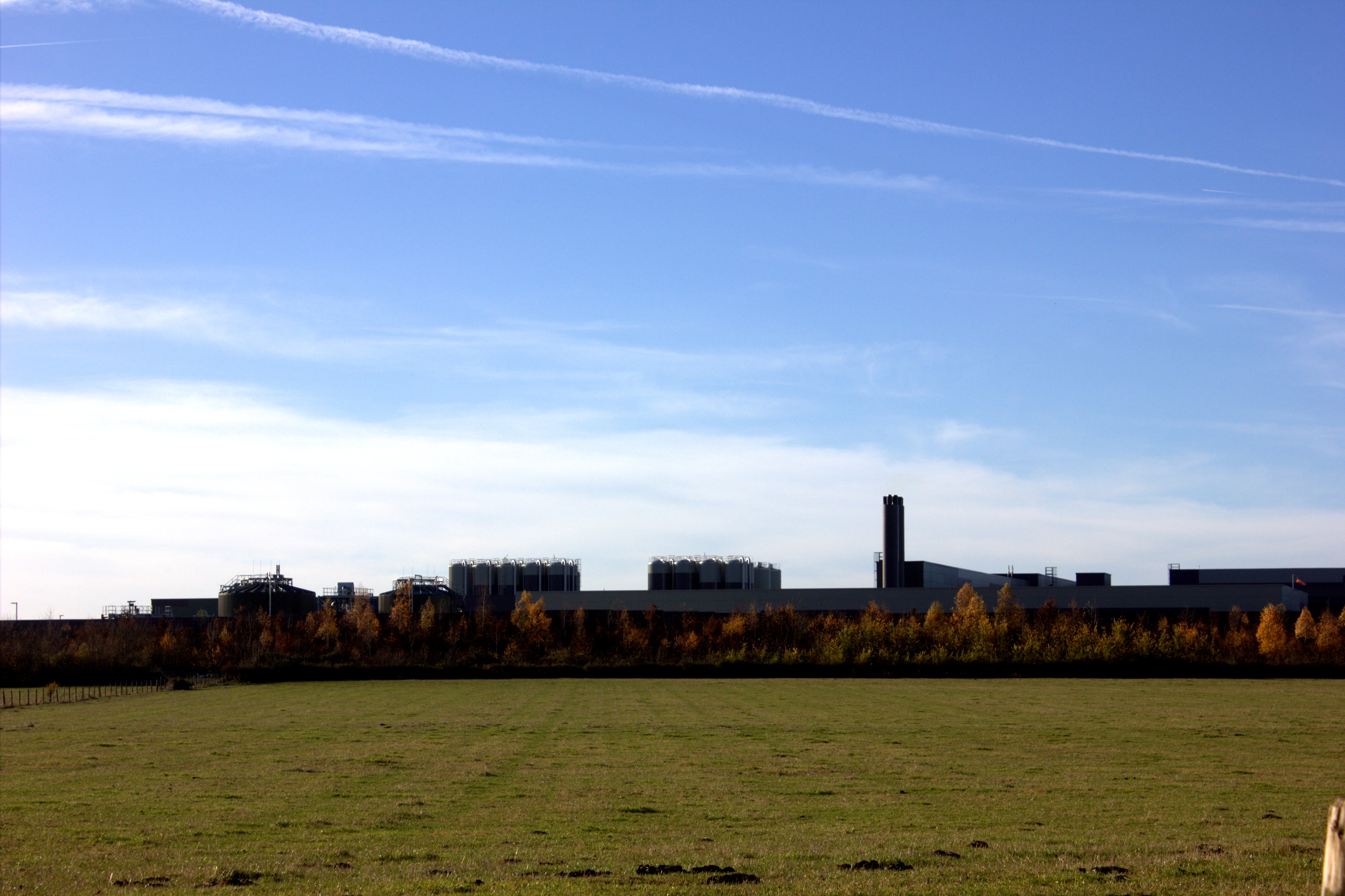
- Seen in November 2016

- Location within Buckinghamshire

General information
- Type: Dairy
- Location: Buckland, Buckinghamshire, HP22 5EZ, England
- Coordinates: 51.812°N 0.73°W
- Elevation: 90 m (295 ft)
- Current tenants: 700 staff
- Construction started: February 2012
- Inaugurated: 28 May 2014
- Cost: £150m
- Client: Arla Foods UK
- Owner: Arla Foods UK

Technical details
- Floor area: 36 acres

Design and construction
- Main contractor: Caddick Construction

Website
- Arla Aylesbury

Arla Aylesbury is the largest dairy in the UK; at opening it was the world's biggest dairy, processing over 1.75 billion pints (1 billion litres) of milk per year, around 10% of the milk in the UK.

It is owned by Arla Foods UK which is a subsidiary of Arla Foods, a large producer of dairy products in Scandinavia.

== History ==
The UK dairy industry is worth around £3.7bn.

=== Construction ===
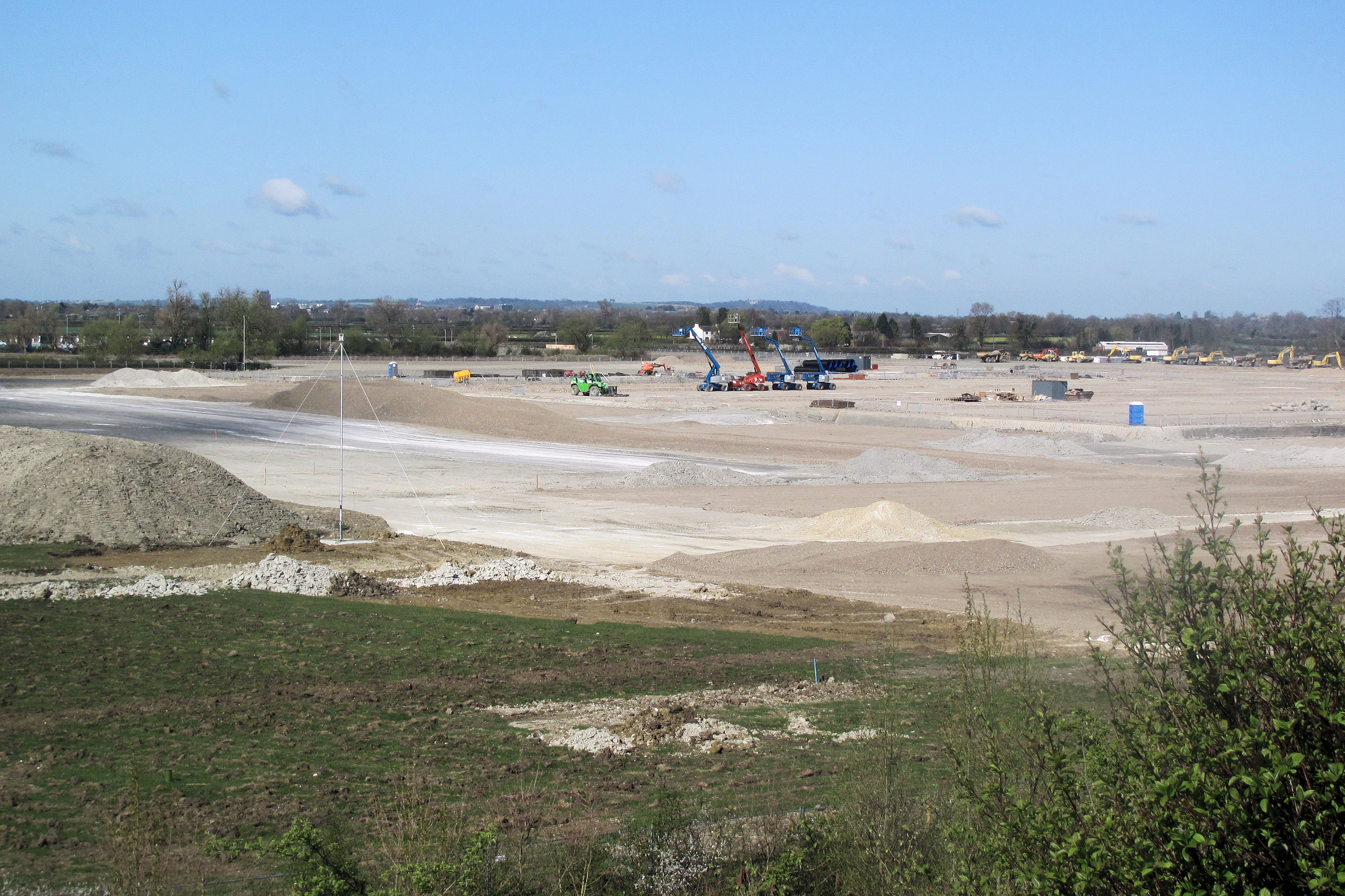
Under construction April 2012

The first investment proposal for the dairy came in November 2009. Planning permission was submitted in September 2011. Construction started in February 2012, by Caddick Construction.

The plant was officially opened on 28 May 2014, with Åke Hantoft, the Chairman of Arla Foods, in attendance.

=== Visits ===
The site was shown in an episode of the BBC Two series Inside the Factory on 7 May 2015, where Gregg Wallace met the 'milk robots'.

=== Incidents ===
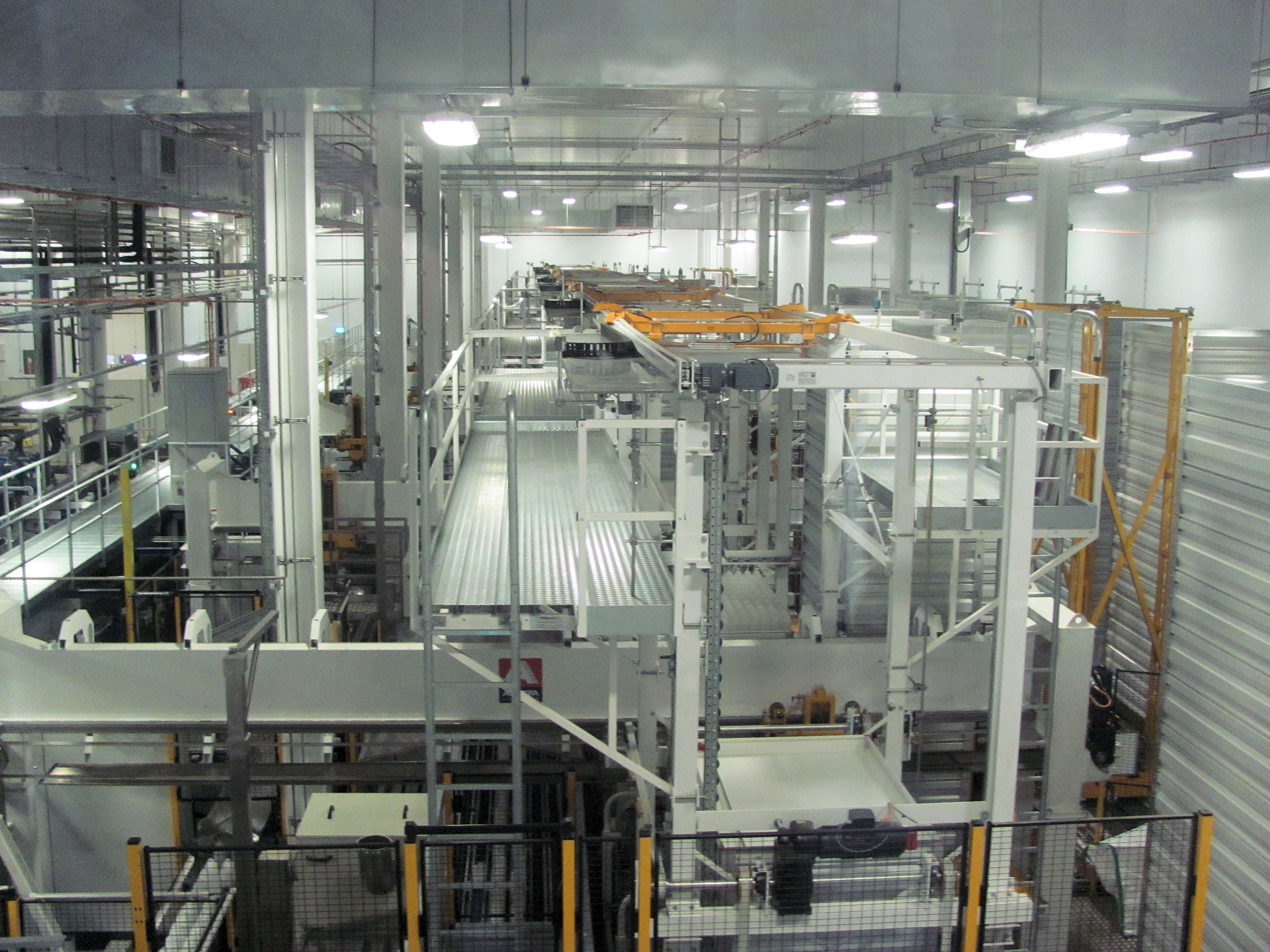
Bottles being made in October 2014

Around 30 protesters from Animal Rebellion on 31 August 2021 visited the plant. Eight protestors were arrested, and appeared at High Wycombe magistrates on 21 July 2022, but were acquitted, as no provable damage had taken place.

== Production ==
It can process up to 420,000 pints (240,000 litres) of milk per hour. Arla Foods UK processes 6.1 billion pints (3.5 billion of litres) of milk per year, turning over £2.2bn. It has eight processing lines, with eight bottle sizes. Around 900 farmers supply milk to the site; Arla UK represents around 2,800 British dairy farmers.

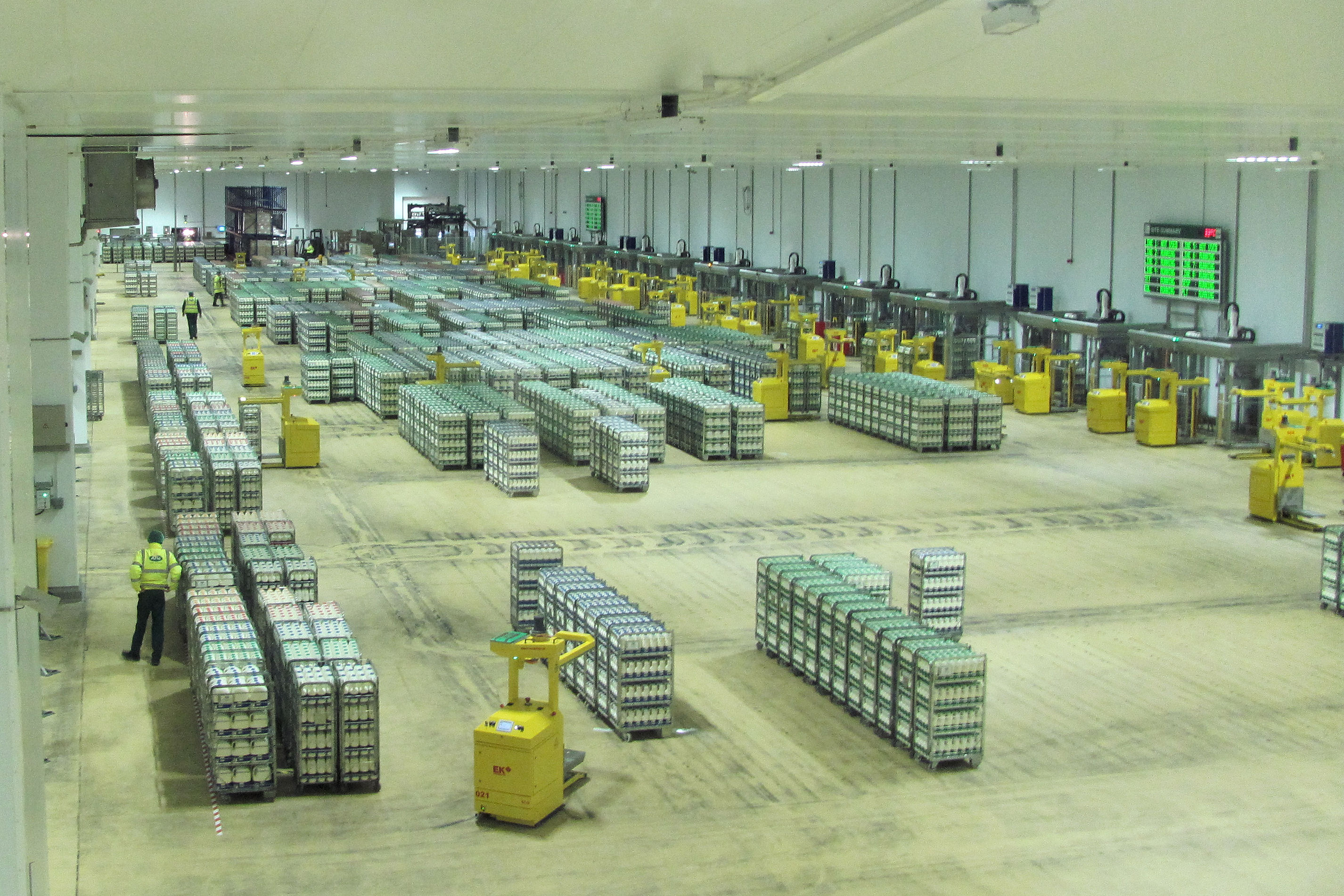
Robots in October 2014

It produces about five bottles per second and makes around 400 deliveries from the site each day. In despatch, all the milk is transported by robots - it is the only dairy in the UK like this, working with RFID technology. Without robots, it would require around 300 workers in despatch. Around 30% of UK dairy farms have robotic systems.

Arla in the UK makes around 43% of Britain's butter.

== Structure ==
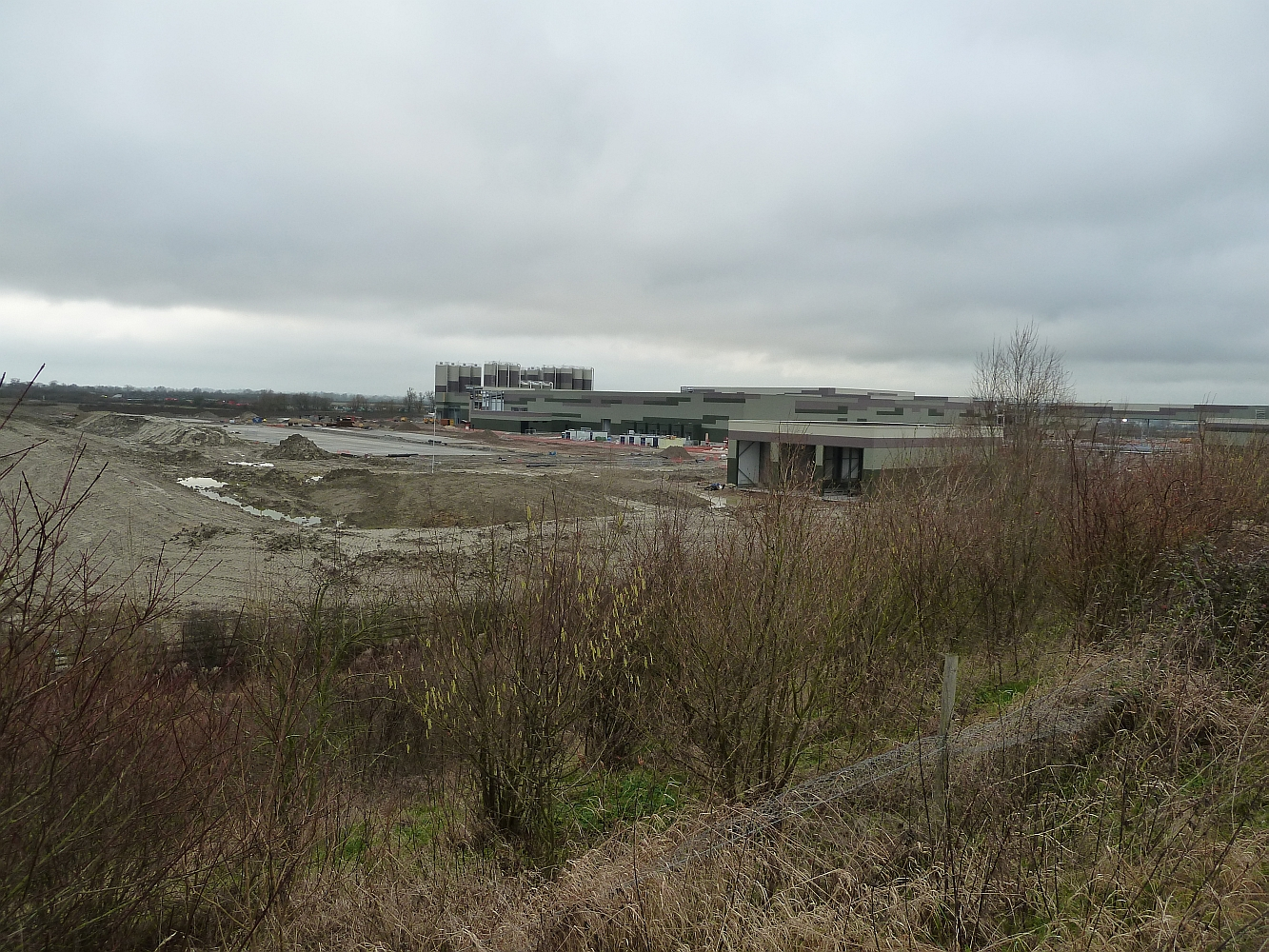
Under construction in April 2012

It is situated north of the A41 in Aylesbury Vale, and between this to the south and the Aylesbury Arm of the Grand Union Canal to the north. The total site is 70 acres.

== See also ==
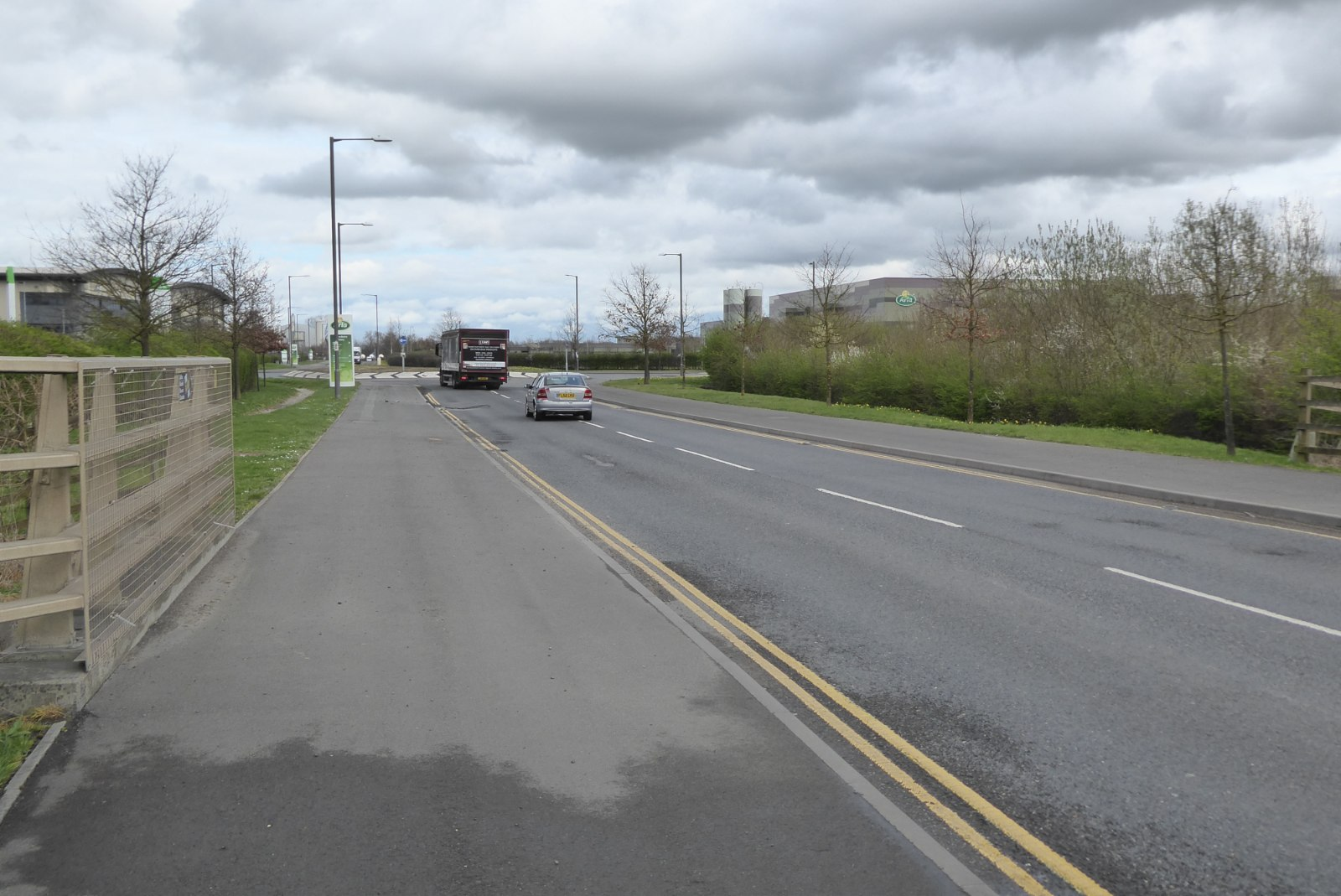
Entrance in March 2024

- CCE Wakefield, Europe's largest soft drinks factory, in West Yorkshire
- Davidstow Creamery in Cornwall, the largest cheese factory in the UK
- Tirlán site at Ballyragget in County Kilkenny, built in the 1960s by Avonmore Creameries, the site was part-owned by Unigate until 1978. It claims to be the largest dairy site in Europe, the company was known as Glanbia until 2022
