= CCE Wakefield =

Soft drinks factory in Yorkshire, England

CCEP Wakefield
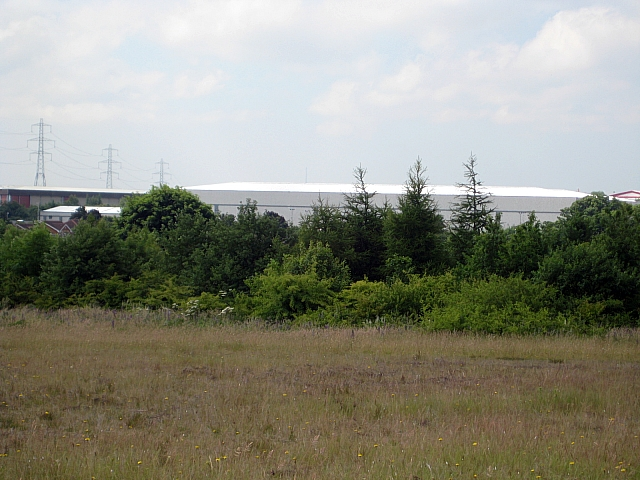
- View of the can factory with the soft drinks plant behind (2009)

- Location within West Yorkshire Location within England

General information
- Type: Soft drinks factory
- Location: Wakefield, WF2 0XR, England
- Coordinates: 53.719°N 1.521°W
- Elevation: 95 m (312 ft)
- Current tenants: 450 staff
- Completed: 1989
- Inaugurated: 2 October 1989
- Cost: £90m
- Client: Coca-Cola & Schweppes Beverages
- Owner: Coca-Cola Europacific Partners

Website
- CCE Wakefield

CCE Wakefield is a large soft drinks factory in West Yorkshire owned by Coca-Cola Enterprises UK; it is the largest soft-drinks factory in Europe (by volume of drinks produced).

== History ==
=== Construction ===
In March 1988 Schweppes and Coca-Cola announced that they would jointly build the largest soft drinks factory in Europe, to cost £55m. It would be built by 1991, with 470 employees. The joint venture of Schweppes and Coca Cola had UK sales of £450m.

Hoval boilers were installed, three of 4000kW, made in Newark-on-Trent. There was a £300000 order for 26 stainless steel vessels for Wincanton Engineering of Sherborne. Most of the plant was designed in Uxbridge. Nacanco operated the canning plant.

It was built in 1989 at the Wakefield 41 Business Park in Outwood.

=== Opening ===
In April 1988 a single-union agreement was signed with the Amalgamated Engineering Union. In August 1988 the Transport and General Workers' Union threatened action at Coca Cola's 26 plants in the UK, if the agreement went ahead. 900 TGWU workers at Coca Cola plants started a work to rule, and an overtime ban in August 1988.

It was officially opened on 2 October 1989. In 1989 it could produce 4,000 cans per minute; by late 1990 it was making 6,000 cans per minute. The Lingwall Gate Action Group claimed that the canning facility made air pollution. 220,000 trees were planted.

From the five years after 2009, Coca-Cola invested over £100m in the plant, and £240m had been invested at the site before 2009. The main office of CCEP is in Milton Keynes.

Coca-Cola has six factories in the UK.

=== Visits ===
- Prince Richard, Duke of Gloucester visited at 10.30am on 22 October 1990
- The site was visited by David Cameron, when Prime Minister, in 2010 and June 2014.

== Production ==
The site produces 6,000 cans of soft drinks per minute, which is 100 per second, and up to 2,200 PET bottles a minute (HDPE bottle caps); this works out to up to one billion litres of soft drink a year. The factory can produce 40,000 PET bottles (empty) an hour.

Robotics were introduced in 2015.

Next door is a factory of (former) Rexam, that produces the metal cans. The plant sources its water from the nearby Ardsley Reservoir which is 1.2 miles (2 km) to the west.

=== Production in the UK ===
In the 1950s Coca-Cola was supplied by a joint venture with Watney Combe in the south of England. There was one factory around 1951, in Willesden.

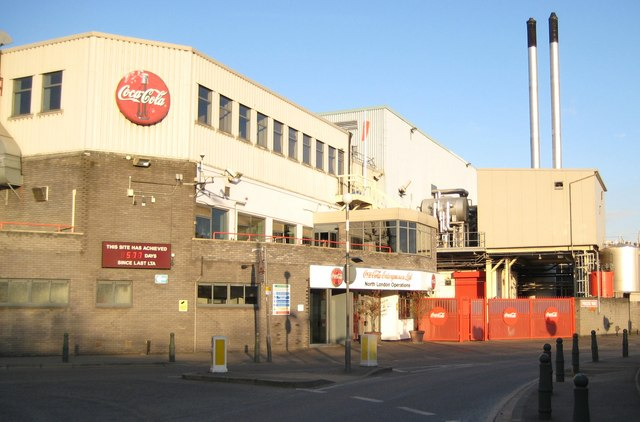
Enfield factory in March 2008

In 1964 Fanta was introduced, which replaced 'Orangedew', and the Enfield plant opened, producing 48 million bottles a year. This factory is on the Eley Industrial Estate.

A factory at Heathfield, Devon opened in 1967.

Coca Cola in Milton Keynes first opened around 1977, the first UK canning plant, costing £4m.

It produces a third of the UK's requirement.

Coca-Cola had wanted to build a similar plant for south of England. Swindon rejected their plans on 27 February 1990. In October 1990 Coca-Cola decided to open a 54-acre site in Northampton, but never did.

Coca-Cola had a four acre distribution centre at Winwick Quay near Warrington; this was sold in 1993 and moved distribution to Wakefield.

=== Incidents ===
Contract worker 42 year old David Douglas fell 30 ft through a roof and died in Pinderfields Hospital on 21 September 1995.

== Structure ==
It is situated on the north of the Wakefield 41 industrial estate, next to the M1 motorway, about 0.62 miles (1 km) from junction 41. The site has an area the size of 16 football pitches, but when aggregated with the company's own solar farm (1.5 miles (2.4 km) further north), the footprint covers 33 football pitches.

== See also ==
- Arla Aylesbury, UK's and world's largest dairy
- Manor Bakeries at Carlton, South Yorkshire, the largest bakery site in Europe, constructed from 1972 costing £11m, opened around 1975
