= Alverthorpe railway station =

Disused railway station in West Yorkshire, England

Alverthorpe

General information
- Location: Alverthorpe, City of Wakefield; England
- Coordinates: 53.6878°N 1.5275°W
- Grid reference: SE313213
- Platforms: 2

Other information
- Status: Disused

History
- Original company: Great Northern Railway
- Pre-grouping: Great Northern Railway
- Post-grouping: London and North Eastern Railway

Key dates
- October 1872: Station opens
- 5 April 1954: Station closes
Location

Alverthorpe railway station served the village of Alverthorpe near Wakefield in the English county of West Yorkshire.

== History ==
Opened by the Bradford, Wakefield and Leeds Railway, the station had two platforms. It became part of the London and North Eastern Railway during the Grouping of 1923. The line then passed on to the Eastern Region of British Railways on nationalisation in 1948, closing a mere six years later. Although the station was closed to normal passenger and freight traffic from 5 April 1954, passenger facilities were retained for special and excursion trains.

== The site today ==
The station was situated on an embankment northeast of Batley Road, after the railway crossed over the road on a bridge near the junction with Grasmere Road. The location is marked by a row of terraced houses. Nothing now remains on site, and the two sides of the triangular junction northeast of the station that connected it with the line between Wakefield and Leeds have been dismantled. Trains still use the eastern part of the triangle, bypassing the site between Outwood and Wakefield Westgate stations on the Wakefield Line.

Preceding station	Disused railways	Following station
Flushdyke	London and North Eastern Railway; Great Northern Railway	Lofthouse and Outwood
Flushdyke	London and North Eastern Railway; Great Northern Railway	Wakefield Westgate
