= Outwood, Wakefield =

Settlement in West Yorkshire, England

Coordinates: 53.712°N 1.500°W

Outwood
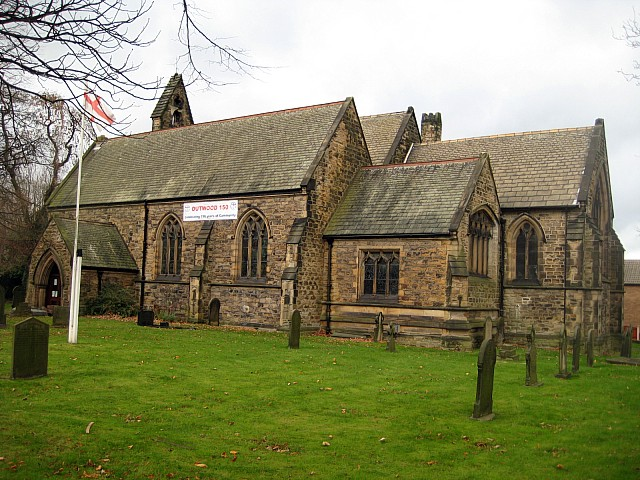
- Church of St. Mary Magdalene

- Location within West Yorkshire
- Population: 7,623
- OS grid reference: SE330240
- Metropolitan borough: City of Wakefield
- Metropolitan county: West Yorkshire
- Region: Yorkshire and the Humber
- Country: England
- Sovereign state: United Kingdom
- Post town: Wakefield
- Postcode district: WF1
- Police: West Yorkshire
- Fire: West Yorkshire
- Ambulance: Yorkshire
- UK Parliament: Morley and Outwood

Outwood is a district to the north of Wakefield, in West Yorkshire, England. The district is centred on the A61 Leeds Road south of Lofthouse. It grew up as a pit village and was only a small settlement until the 1970s, when construction of new houses caused it to grow and merge with neighbouring settlements such as Wrenthorpe and Stanley. In 2001, it had a population of 7,623.

== History ==
Not recorded in Domesday Book, it is possible the settlement of Outwood gets its earliest literary mention in around 1400 in "The Lyttle Gest of Robyn Hode". Transcribed from at least a century of oral renditions telling the stories of Robin Hood and published in print form a century later in 1500, the prominent work features a mention of the name or phrase 'Outwoods'. This is quite possibly the earliest mention in any work of literature of one of England's greatest national myths alongside King Arthur and Joseph of Arimathea.

Outwood was the site of a pit disaster on 4 March 1879, when 21 people were killed in an explosion at Deep Drop Colliery.

In 1905, the miners left homeless by the Kinsley evictions camped at Outwood Hall Farm, off Victoria Street, until they were able to return to their homes in Kinsley.

The area near the railway station was once the site of Lofthouse pit, that is known for the disaster in March 1973 that claimed the lives of several miners. The coal mine closed in 1981, and many of the coal miners subsequently took transfers to the new Selby Coalfield and left the village. The site of the mine is now a golf course, now closed, and housing estate.

The Wakefield 41 Industrial Estate is also situated near to Outwood.

The parish church St Mary Magdalene was dedicated in 1858.

Outwood was formerly a chapelry in the parish of Wakefield, on 31 December 1894 Outwood became a civil parish, being formed from part of Stanley cum Wrenthorpe, on 1 April 1936 the parish was abolished and merged with Stanley and Wakefield. In 1931 the parish had a population of 9254.

== Transport ==
Outwood railway station is an unstaffed station, served by Northern, offering rail services towards Leeds, Wakefield, Doncaster and Sheffield. The A61 (Leeds Road) runs through the middle of Outwood, connecting towards Leeds to the north and Wakefield to the south. Junction 41 of the M1 is also close-by.

== Education ==
Outwood is home to Outwood Grange Academy, one of the largest secondary schools in the UK with over 2,100 students. The local primary schools are Outwood Primary Academy Ledger Lane (headteacher Rachael Skirrow) and Rooks Nest Academy (headteacher Kimberley Dawson).

== Sport and recreation ==
Outwood is home to one park. Outwood Park has facilities for football, 5 a side, crown green bowling and a children's play area. Outwood is also home to two other playing fields and another play area. Local teams include Nightingale Football Club and Outwood Rangers Junior Football Club.

== Local agriculture ==
Outwood is located within the Rhubarb Triangle. Because of its mining history Outwood has good supplies of soot and ash to condition its soil, which provide good conditions for the plant to grow.

== Economy ==
CCE Wakefield is a main factory, with the rest of the Wakefield 41 industrial estate.

== See also ==
- Listed buildings in Wrenthorpe and Outwood West
