= John Edwards (minister) =

British minister, born 1714

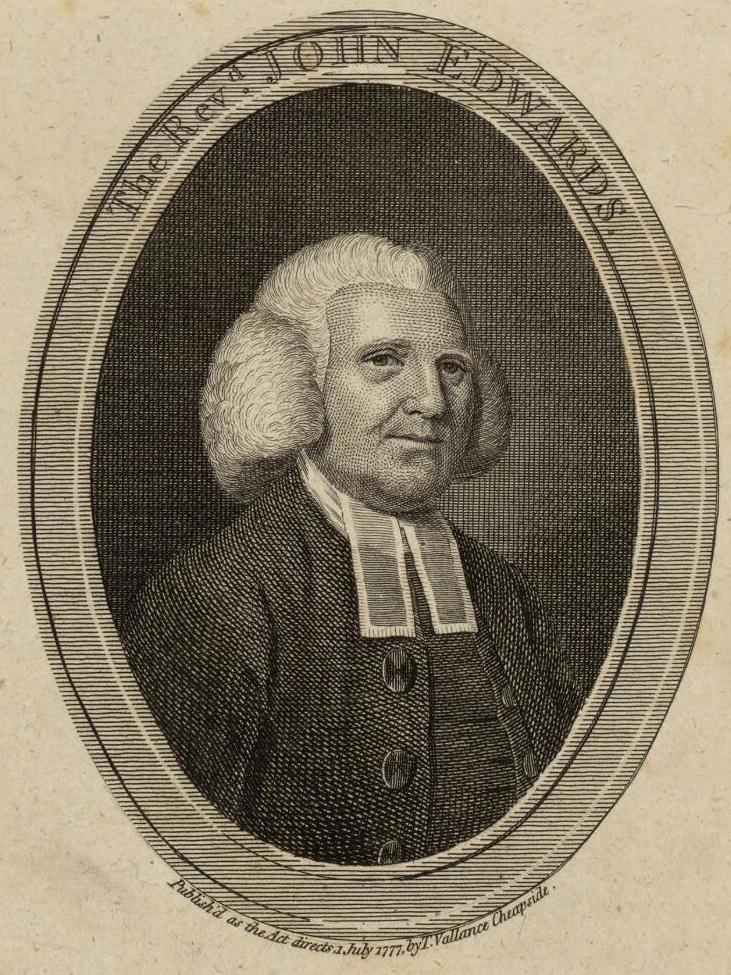
Portrait of John Edwards

John Edwards (1714–1785), was a British dissenting minister at Leeds, Yorkshire.

Edwards was a Methodist preacher who broke with the Wesleyans and set up an Independent church in 1755 at the White Chapel in Hunslet Lane, Leeds.

In 1758 he published A Vindication of the Protestant Doctrine of Justification and its Prechers and Professors from the unjust Charge of Antinomianism; extracted from a letter of the Rev. Mr. Robt. Trail, a minister in the city of London, to a minister in the country, his object being to testify to the world the doctrines advanced by him in his public ministry, which were laid down by Robert Trail in this letter. In 1762 he published The Safe Retreat from impending Judgments, the substance of a sermon preached by Edwards at Leeds, a second edition of which was issued in 1773. At the end of this sermon is advertised 'The Christian Indeed,' another work by the same author. Edwards also edited A Collection of Hymns and Spiritual songs for the use of Serious and Devout Christians of all Denominations, of which a second edition, "with alterations", was published in 1709. He died in 1785.

A mezzotint portrait after John Russell, engraved by James Watson, was published by Carington Bowles in 1772.
