= Flushdyke railway station =

Disused railway station in West Yorkshire, England

Flushdyke

General information
- Location: Ossett, West Yorkshire
- Coordinates: 53.6853°N 1.5666°W
- Grid position: SE287210
- Platforms: 2

History
- Original company: Great Northern Railway
- Pre-grouping: Great Northern Railway
- Post-grouping: London and North Eastern Railway

Key dates
- 7 April 1862: Opened
- 5 May 1941: Closed
Location

Flushdyke was a Great Northern Railway station on Wakefield Road in Flushdyke, West Yorkshire. The station originally opened (as Ossett) on the north side of Wakefield Road on 7 April 1862, was renamed Flushdyke when the later Ossett station opened two years later, and at some date moved to the south side of the road bridge. It was closed from 5 May 1941. Steps from the road led to two side platforms, each with a shelter.

Preceding station	Disused railways	Following station
Ossett	London and North Eastern Railway; Great Northern Railway	Alverthorpe
