= Salem Chapel, Leeds =

Former chapel in West Yorkshire, England

Coordinates: 53°47′32.4″N 1°32′27.6″W

Salem Chapel is a former Congregational church, located on Hunslet Lane, Leeds, West Yorkshire, England. It is situated opposite the former Tetley's Brewery.

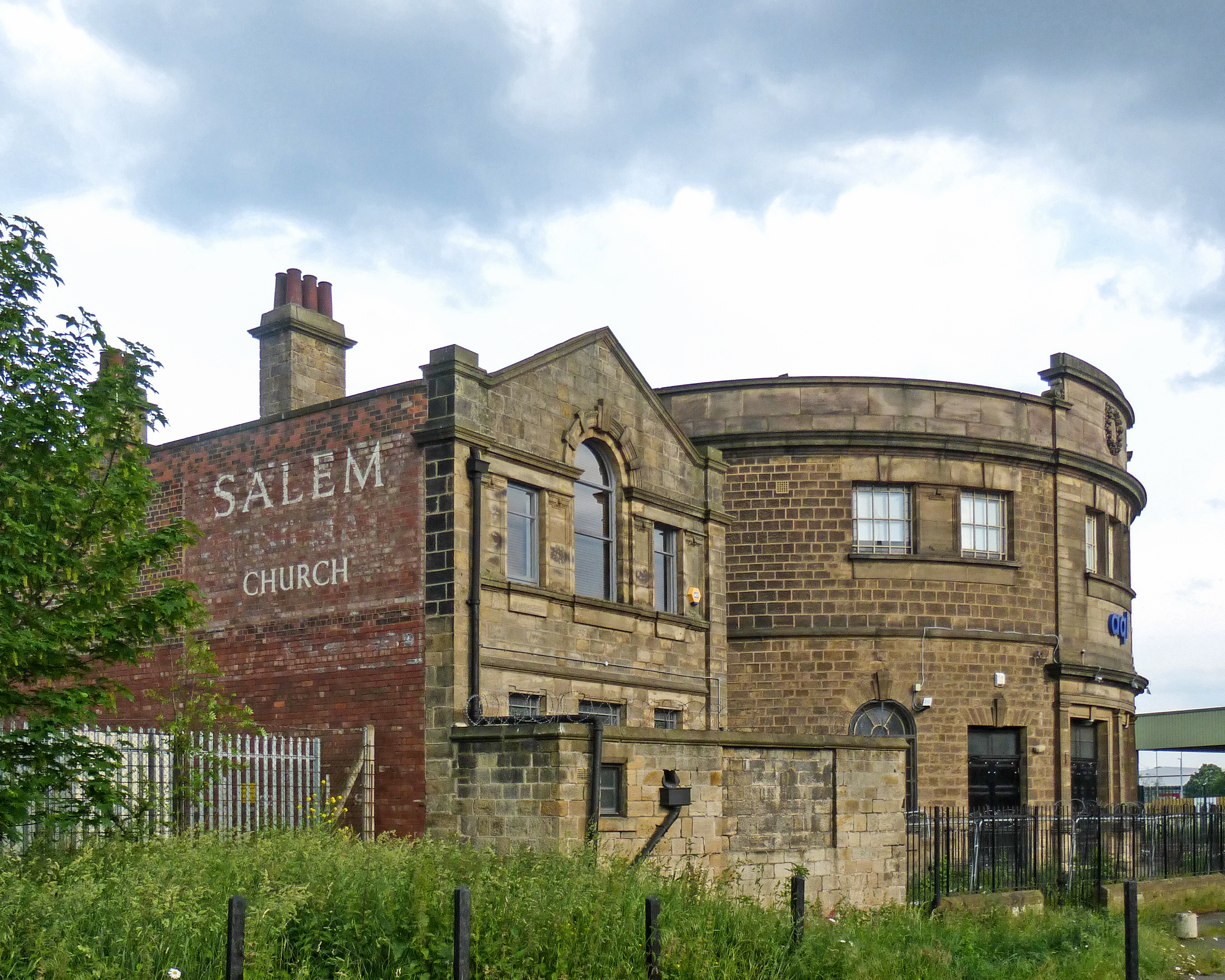
Salem Chapel, Leeds

== History ==
Built in 1791 by the Rev Edward Parsons, Salem is the oldest surviving non-conformist chapel in Leeds city centre.

Salem Chapel is a Grade II listed building and its distinctive curved façade was added in 1906.

The historic chapel was the birthplace of Leeds United Football Club in 1919. Salem's hall was the venue for a public meeting in which Leeds City F.C. was disbanded over financial misdemeanours, and Leeds United F.C. was formed.

The chapel was closed as a place of worship in 2001. The psychologist and writer Reverend Harry Guntrip preached the last sermon.

== Present ==
In 2009, the building was purchased by Professor Adam Beaumont, founder of telecommunications company aql. Beaumont funded the renovation and restoration of the chapel, which now houses aql's head offices, as well as data centres, an exhibition space, a bar and a 370-seat glass-floored auditorium.

On 17 November 2011, Salem Chapel was awarded a blue plaque by the Leeds Civic Trust in recognition of its architectural and religious significance. The plaque was unveiled by the Lord Mayor of Leeds, Councillor Rev’d Alan Taylor.

As of April 2018, Salem Chapel is also home to the Estonian Consulate for the North of England and the Isle of Man.

== Auditorium ==
Salem Chapel is often used to host the launch of Government initiatives. In February 2015, Salem Chapel hosted the then-Prime Minister David Cameron and then-Chancellor of the Exchequer George Osborne for talks as part of the government's Northern Powerhouse proposal. Osborne returned to Salem Chapel in February 2017 with Lord Jim O'Neill to launch the inaugural Northern Powerhouse Partnership (NPP) report. In January 2018, it was used to launch Transport for the North's Strategic Transport Plan to transform transportation in the North of England over the next 30 years.

In addition to Cameron, Osborne and O'Neill, Salem Chapel's auditorium has hosted other notable figures for events and talks, including Britain's first astronaut Helen Sharman OBE and Bas Lansdorp, CEO and co-founder of Mars One, as part of 2018's Leeds International Festival; Tiina Intelmann, Estonian Ambassador to the United Kingdom, and Matt Hancock, Secretary of State for Digital, Culture, Media and Sport.

The launch of Leeds: Cradle of Innovation, a book on the history of innovation in the city by urban geographer Rachael Unsworth and local historian Steve Burt, was held at Salem Chapel on 14 June 2018.

It is among the venues used for Leeds Digital Festival and Leeds International Festival and has hosted the annual FinTech North since the event's inception.

== Salem's ministers ==
- 1784–1833 – Rev Edward Parsons
- 1833–1841 – Rev John Ely
- 1841–1866 – Rev Wm. Hudswell
- 1866–1875 – Rev Henry Tarrant
- 1876–1890 – Rev George Hinds
- 1891–1929 – Rev Bertram Smith; Rev Francis Wrigley
- 1929–1933 – Rev Arthur Briggs
- 1929–1938 – Rev Harry A. Turner
- 1934–1946 – Rev Harry J.S. Guntrip
- 1944–1946 – Rev Vernon Sproxton
- 1946–1954 – Rev J. Norman Beard
- 1949–1956 – Rev Reg. Williams
- 1954–1968 – Rev Norman Charlton
- 1966–1968 – Rev Jean Mortimer
- 1969–? – Rev Graham J. Cook
- 1976–1982 – Rev Adrienne Savage (sharing with Cottingley)

Also associated with Salem, the ministers of the South Leeds Team:

- 1968–1973 – Rev Alice H. Platts
- 1971–1976 – Rev Tony Addy
- 1973–? – Rev Geoff. Rodham
- 1977–? – Rev Simon Swailes
- 1981–? – Rev Colin E. Richards

== Gallery ==
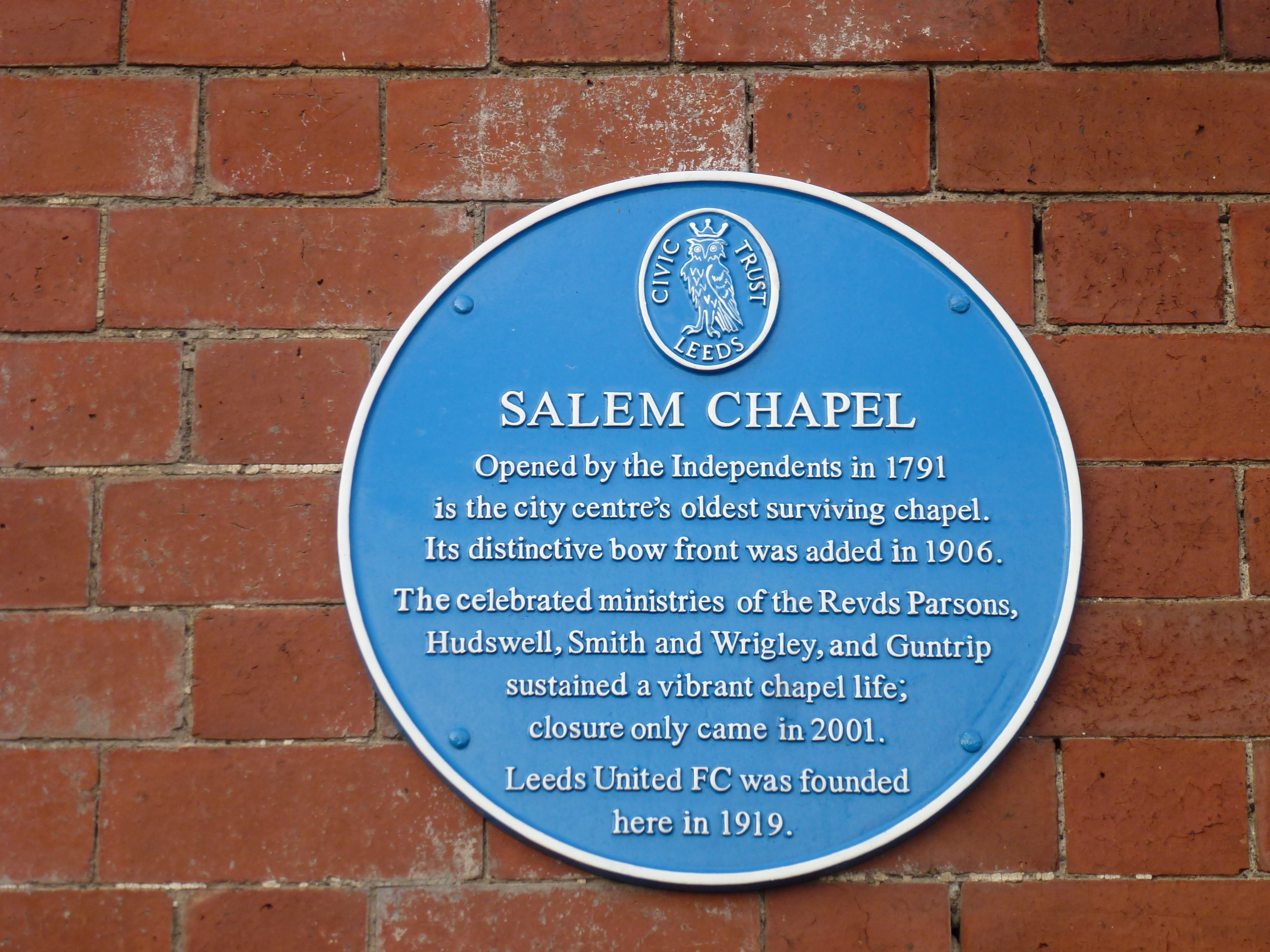
Leeds Civic Trust blue plaque, Salem Chapel, Leeds

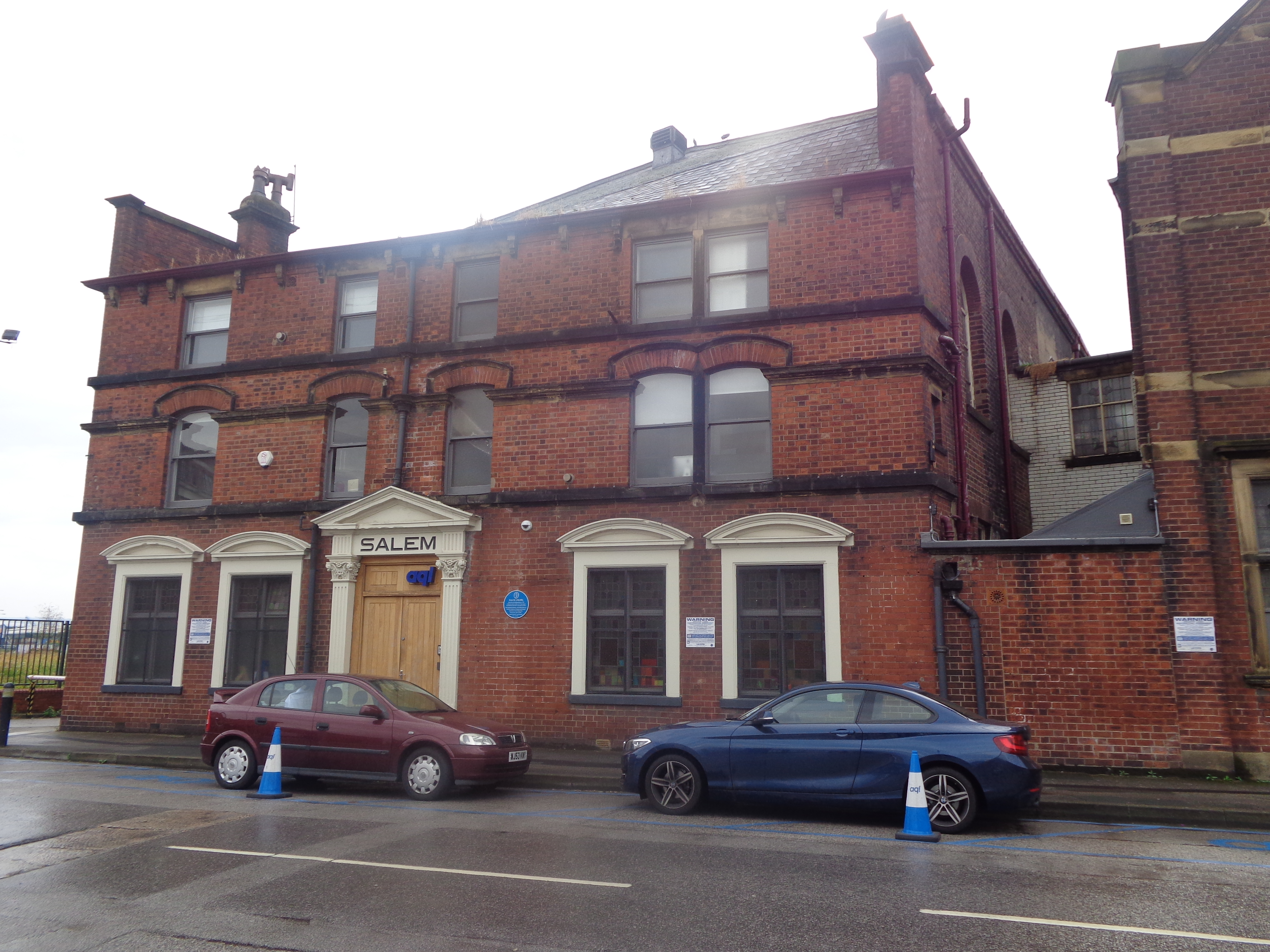
Salem Chapel, Leeds

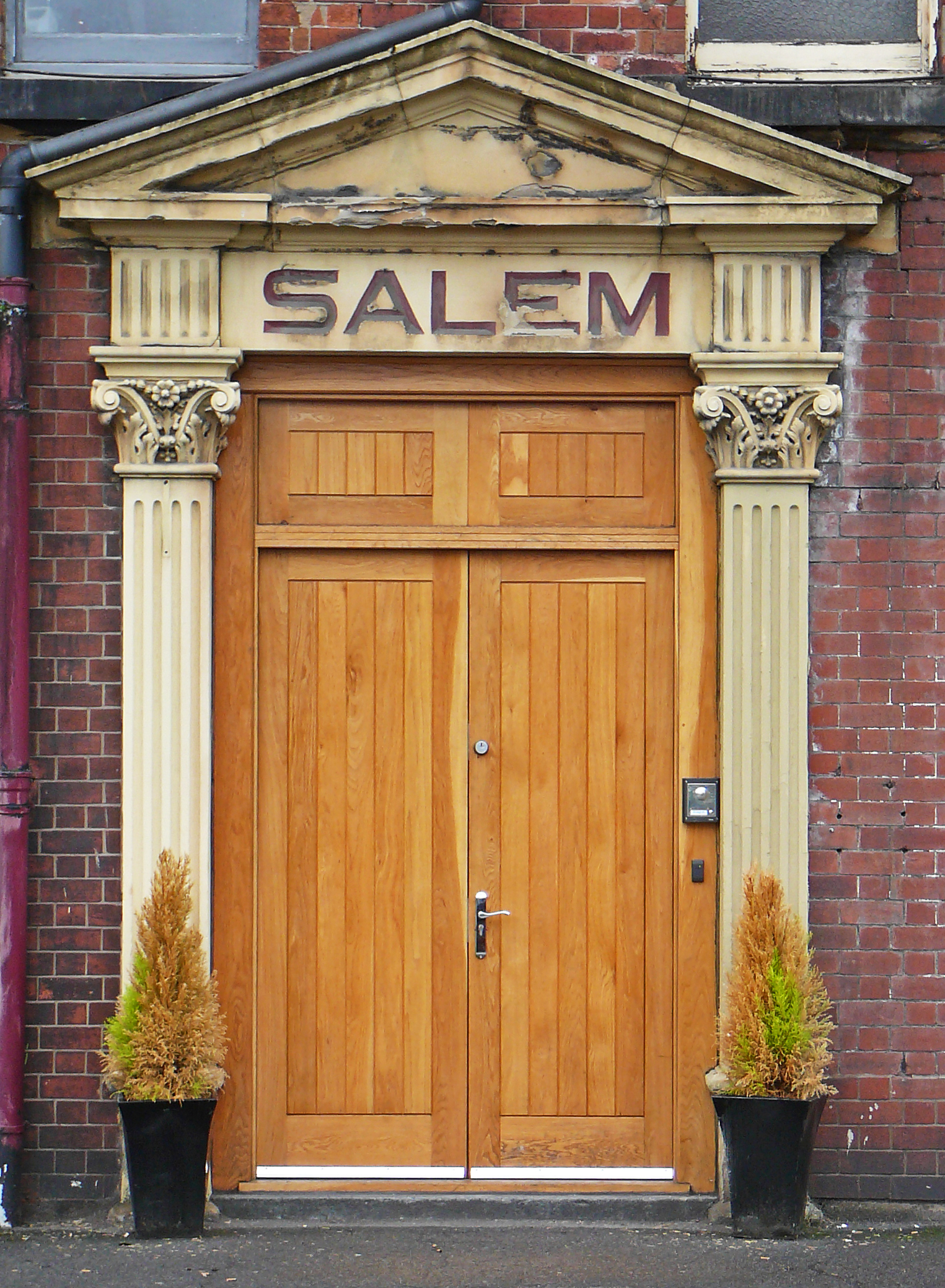
Door, Salem Chapel, Leeds

== See also ==
- Architecture of Leeds
- List of places of worship in the City of Leeds
