= R. M. A. Kingswell =

Richard Martin Alford Kingswell (1 August 1909 – 4 June 1992) was an English rugby union official who was president of the Rugby Football Union between 1972 and 1973.

Whilst RFU president he received credit from the Irish rugby authorities and supporters for taking an England team to play in Dublin in 1973, after Wales and Scotland had refused to play their triple crown matches at Lansdowne Road, Dublin because of the Troubles. This promoted the famous quote from the England captain, John Pullin following England's defeat in the match, "We may not be very good but at least we turn up".

== Personal details ==
He was the son of Mr and Mrs JG Kingswell. He married Miss Mary Talbot Auty at Batley Congregational Church on 1 July 1936.

A solicitor by occupation he worked with his uncle, WH Kingswell in the partnership of Messes Brown, Wilkin and Scott.

== Rugby career ==
He was Honorary Secretary and President of Yorkshire RFU before becoming President of the Rugby Football Union between 1972-1973.

He played his club rugby for Wakefield RFC and Headingley and played 51 times for Yorkshire between 1929 and 1938.

He was Captain of Headingley in 1936-37 and served on the Headingley committee for over 40 years and was President in 1968-9.

A scrum half he was once a non playing replacement for England and featured in the final trials.

According to the Yorkshire Rugby Union Centenary booklet

"Kingswell was primarily and most effectively a scrum half, impeccably courageous in defence and a model of classical tackling, but at the insistence of the county he adapted himself to centre-three quarter and even attempted wing forward to contribute the assets of his experience and unflagging spirit. His playing characteristics were transferred to his administrative obligations and for twelve years Dick Kingswell became much the symbol of Yorkshire Rugby Union that Bob Oakes had been"
