= Portrait of John Carr =

Painting by William Beechey

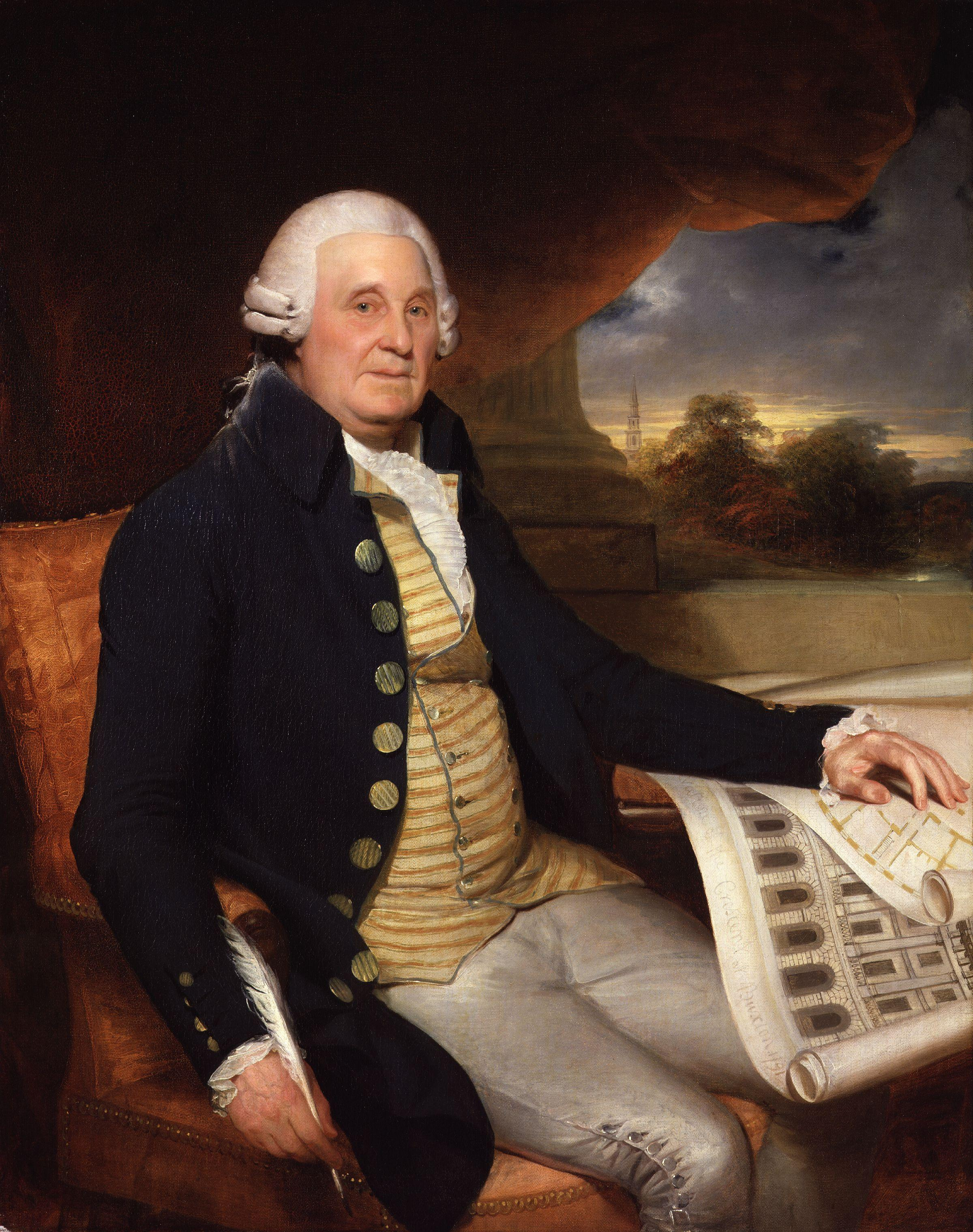
- Artist: William Beechey
- Year: 1791
- Type: Oil on canvas, portrait painting
- Dimensions: 127 cm × 100.5 cm (50 in × 39.6 in)
- Location: National Portrait Gallery, London

Portrait of John Carr is a 1791 portrait painting by the British artist William Beechey. It depicts the English architect John Carr, particularly associated with the many buildings he designed in the North of England. He is shown seated at the age of seventy six holding the plans for Buxton Crescent. In the distance is the spire St Peter's the Carr-designed and funded church in his hometown of Horbury in Yorkshire.

The painting is now in the collection of the National Portrait Gallery in London having been acquired in 1958, but is on long-term loan to Beningbrough Hall. Another version is in the York Mansion House where Carr served as Lord Mayor, showing him with his chain of office. In 1793 a print based on the original painting was produced by the engraver Charles Howard Hodges.

== Bibliography ==
- Ingamells, John. National Portrait Gallery Mid-Georgian Portraits, 1760–1790. National Portrait Gallery, 2004.
- Wragg, Brian. The life and works of John Carr of York. Oblong, 2000.
