= West Riding of Yorkshire =

One of the historic subdivisions of Yorkshire, England

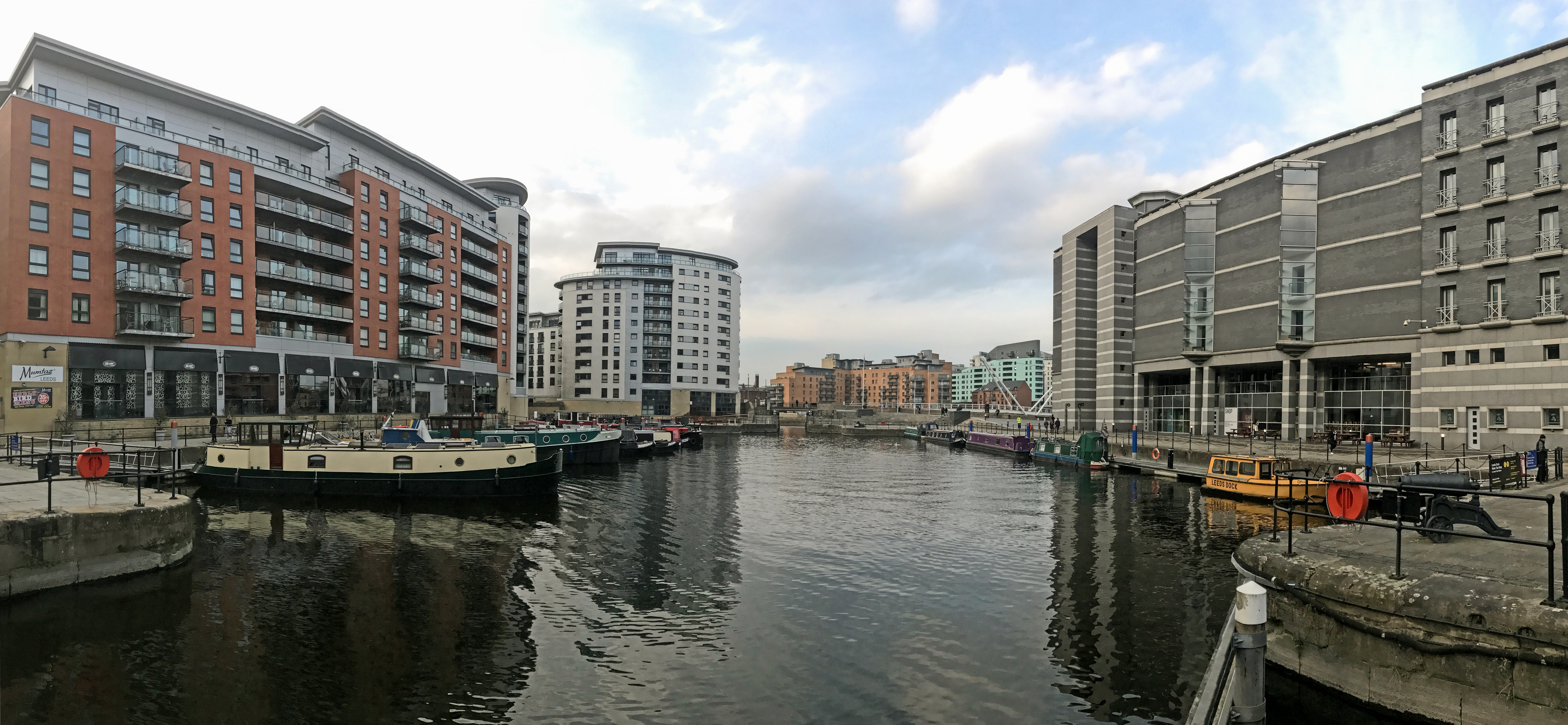
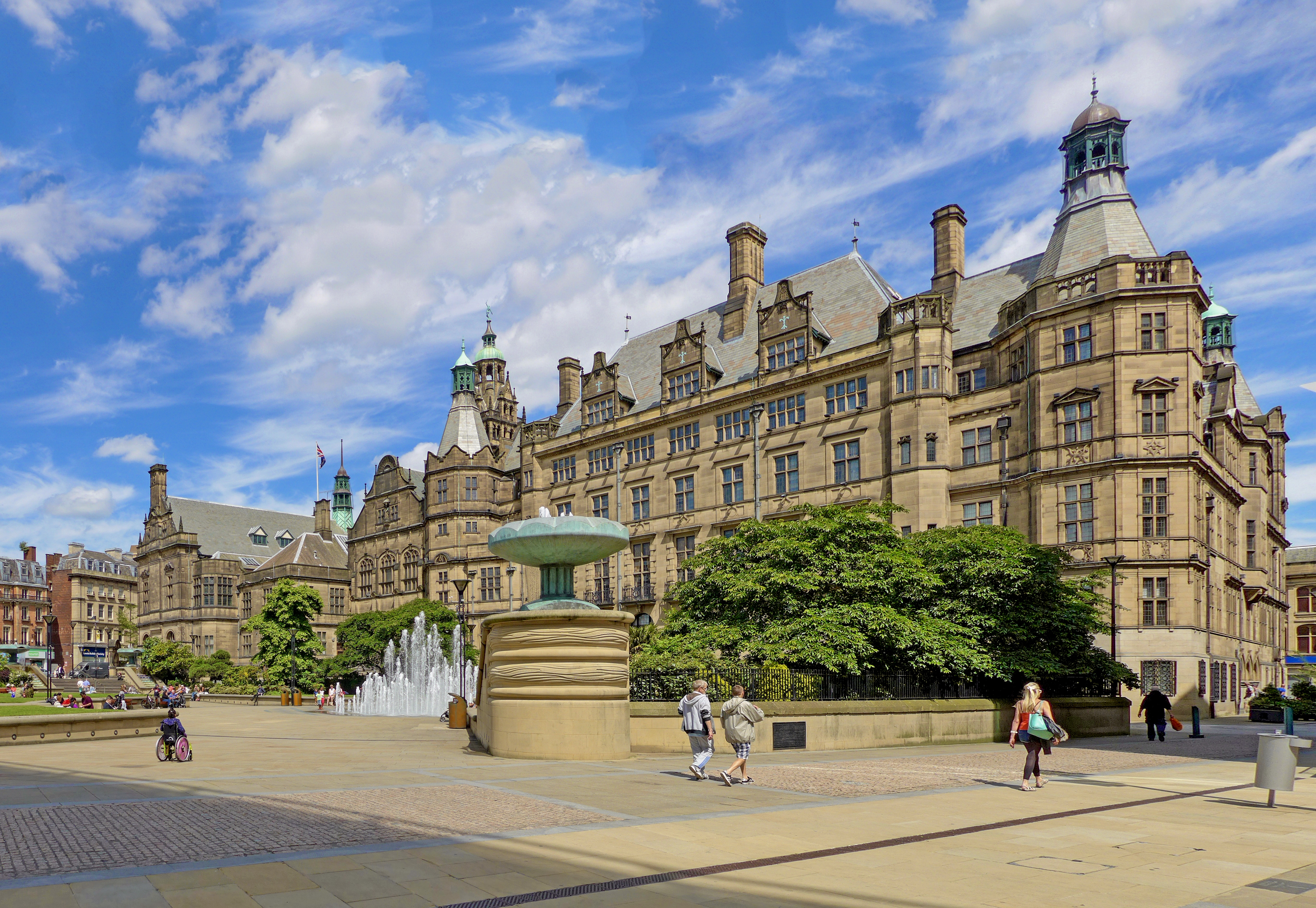
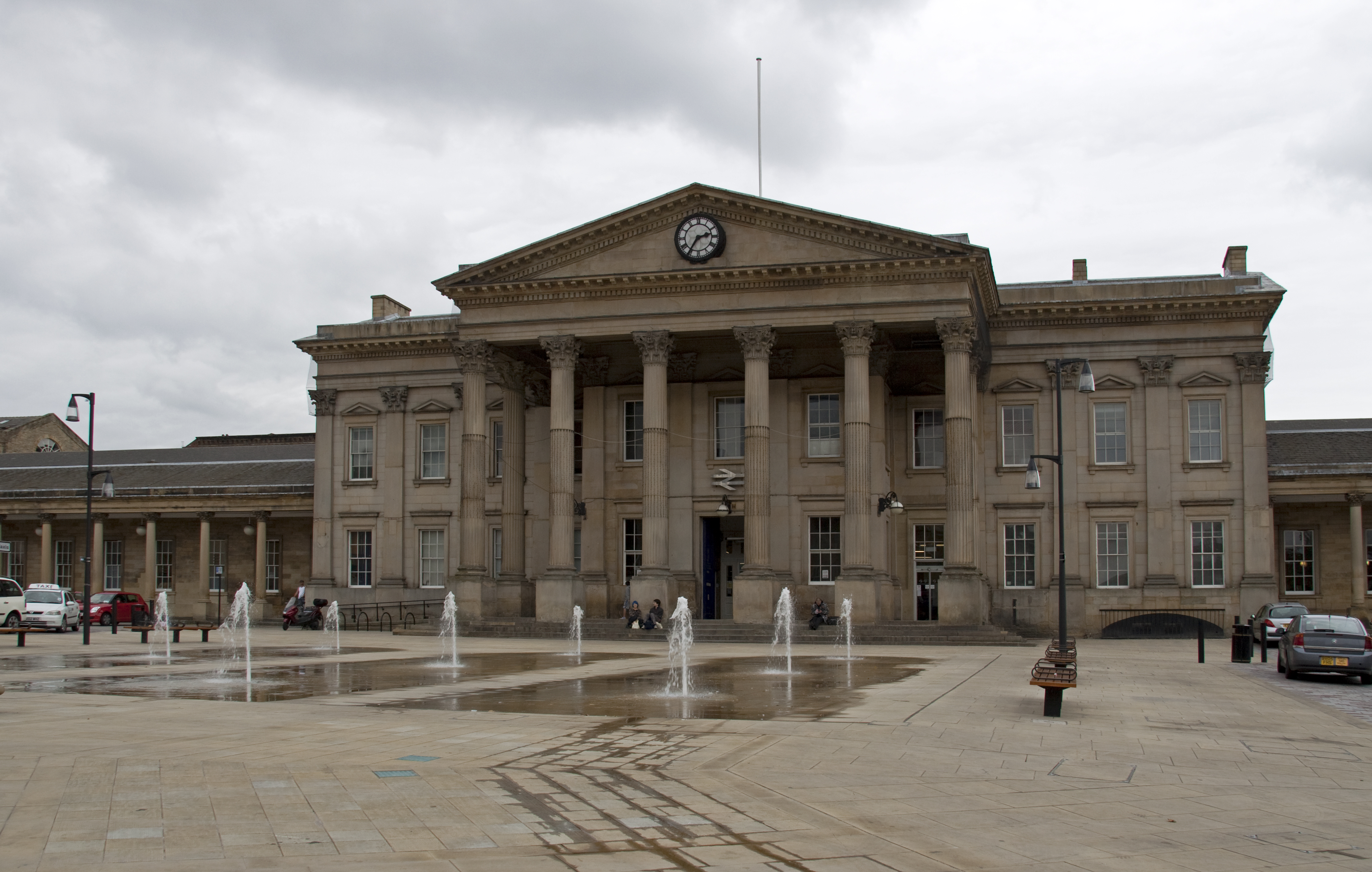
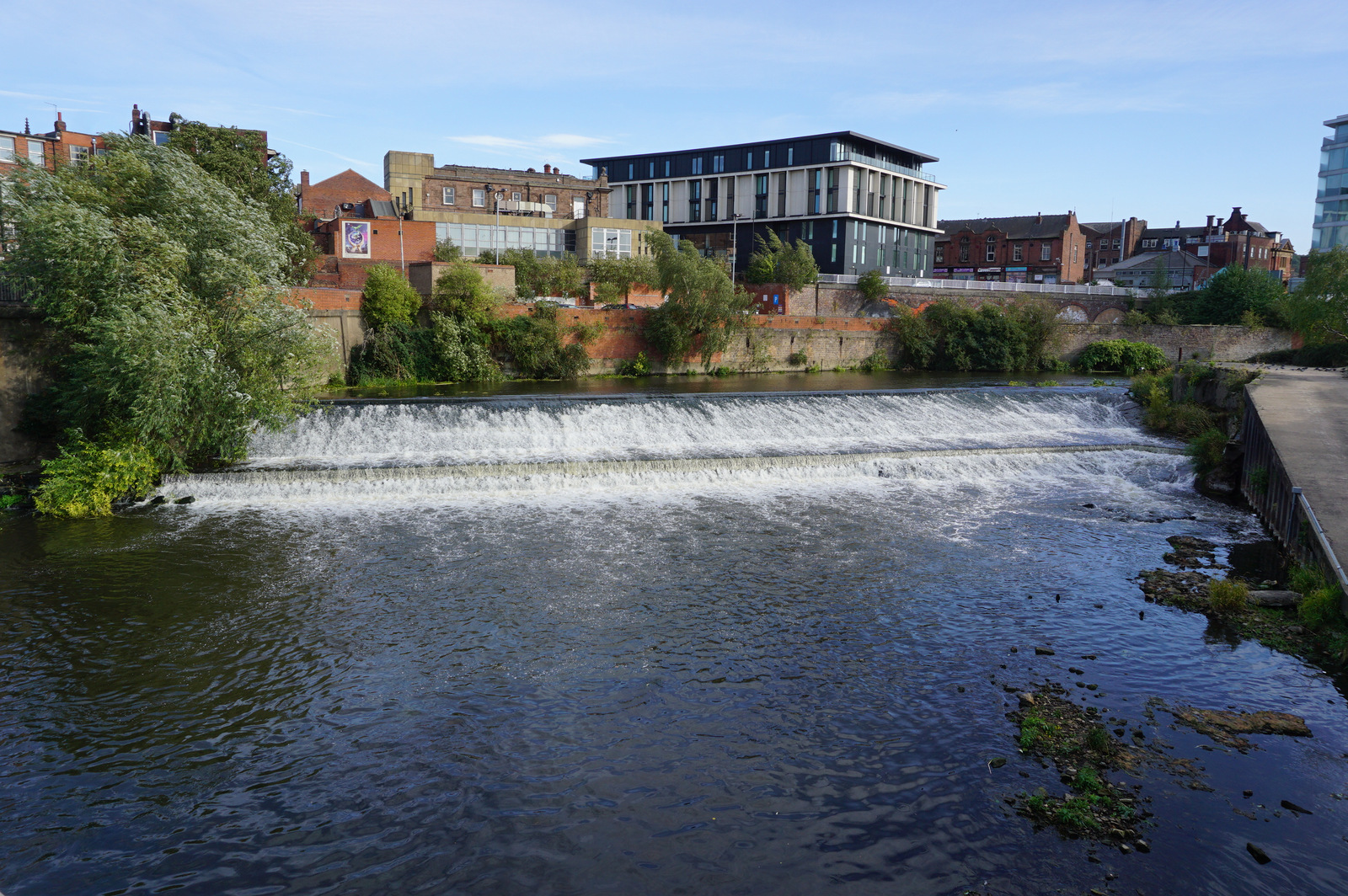
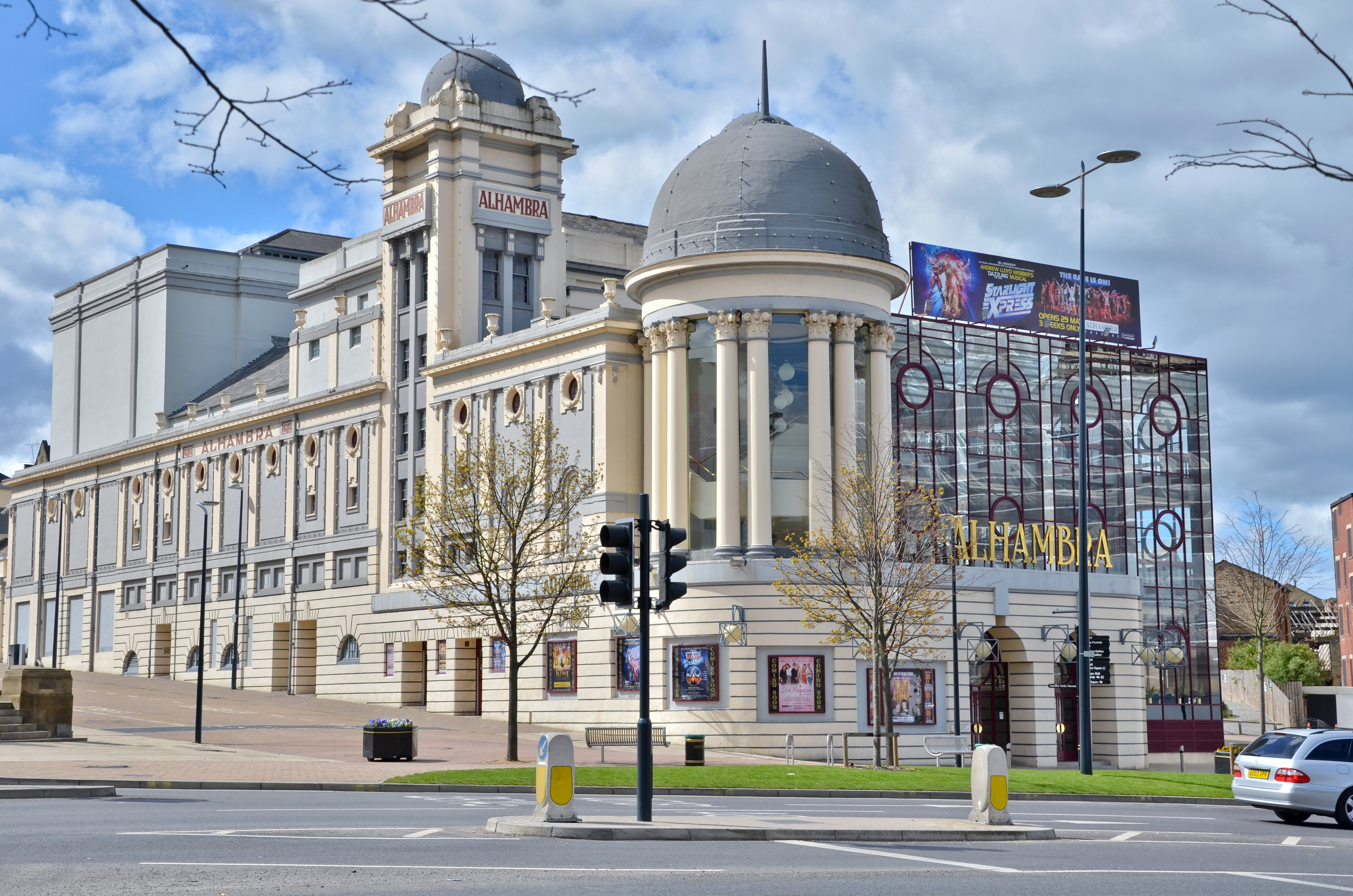
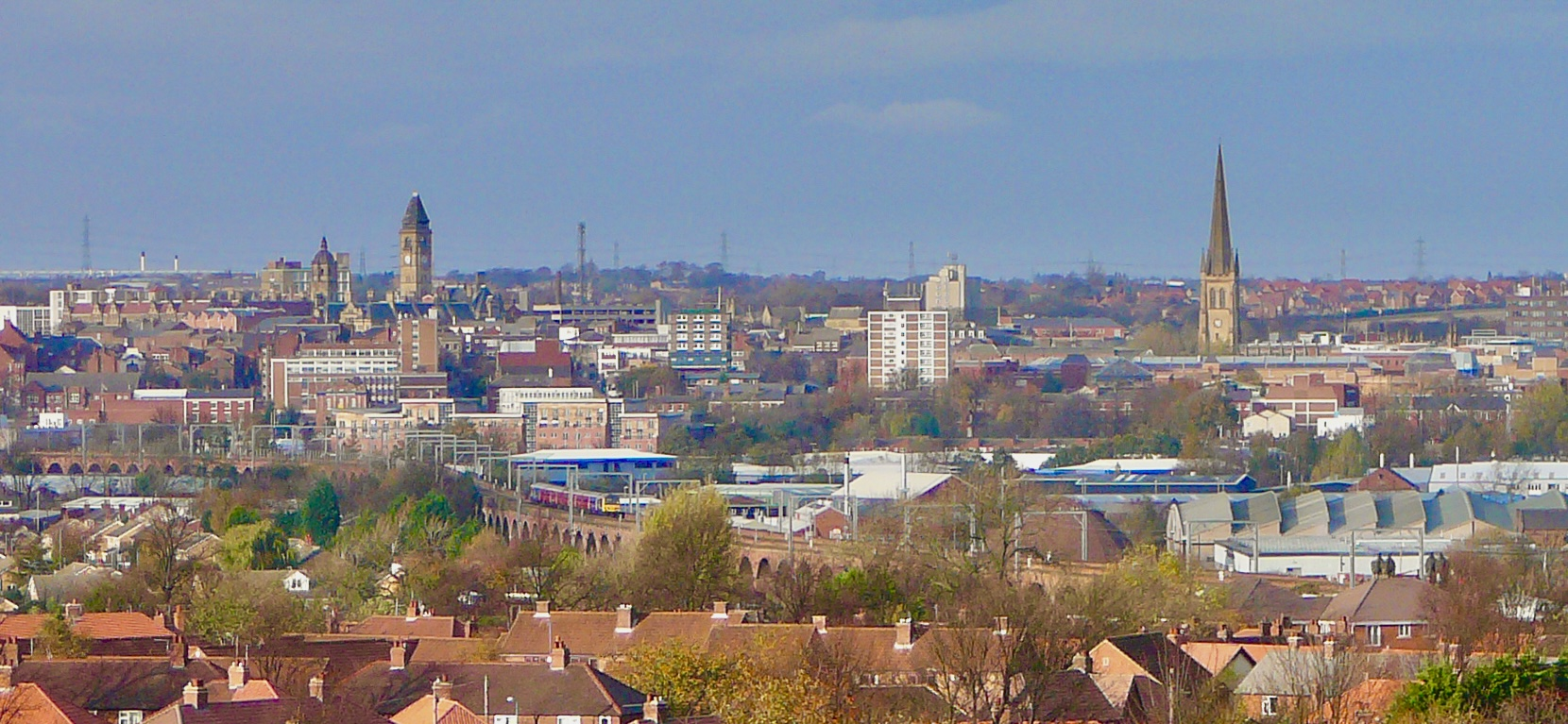
- From top to bottom, left to right; Leeds, Sheffield, Huddersfield, Rotherham, Bradford, Wakefield

- 1888–1974: County of York in England: West Riding (red), North Riding (light green), and East Riding (very pale green)
- Area
  - 1911: 1,685,409 acres (6,820.61 km^{2})
  - 1961: 1,621,068 acres (6,560.23 km^{2})
  - Coordinates: 53.86°N 1.15°W
- Population
  - 1901: 1,538,572
- History
  - Created: Historic riding: AD 889; Administrative county: 1889
  - Abolished: Historic riding: not abolished; Administrative county: 1974
  - Succeeded by: West Yorkshire; South Yorkshire; North Yorkshire; Lancashire; Cumbria; Greater Manchester; Humberside
- Status: Ancient riding, then administrative county
- Chapman code: WRY
- Government
  - HQ: Wakefield
  - Motto: Audi consilium (Heed counsel)
- Coat of arms of West Riding County Council

The West Riding of Yorkshire is one of three historic subdivisions of Yorkshire, England. From 1889 to 1974 the riding was an administrative county named County of York, West Riding. The lieutenancy at that time included the city of York and as such was named "West Riding of the County of York and the County of the City of York". The riding ceased to be used for administrative purposes in 1974, when England's local government was reformed.

Contemporary local government boundaries in Yorkshire largely do not follow those of the riding. West Yorkshire lies entirely within the former area of the riding, as does most of South Yorkshire and the south-west of North Yorkshire. The riding also included areas that are now part of Cumbria, Lancashire, Greater Manchester, and the East Riding of Yorkshire.

== History ==
The subdivision of Yorkshire into three ridings or "thirds" (Old Norse: Þriðungr) is of Scandinavian origin. The West Riding was first recorded (in the form West Treding) in the Domesday Book of 1086.

Unlike most English counties, Yorkshire, being so large, was divided first into the three ridings (East, North and West) and, later, the city of York (which lay within the city walls and was not part of any riding). Each riding was then divided into wapentakes, a division comparable to the hundreds of southern and western England and the wards of England's four northernmost historic counties.

== Geography ==
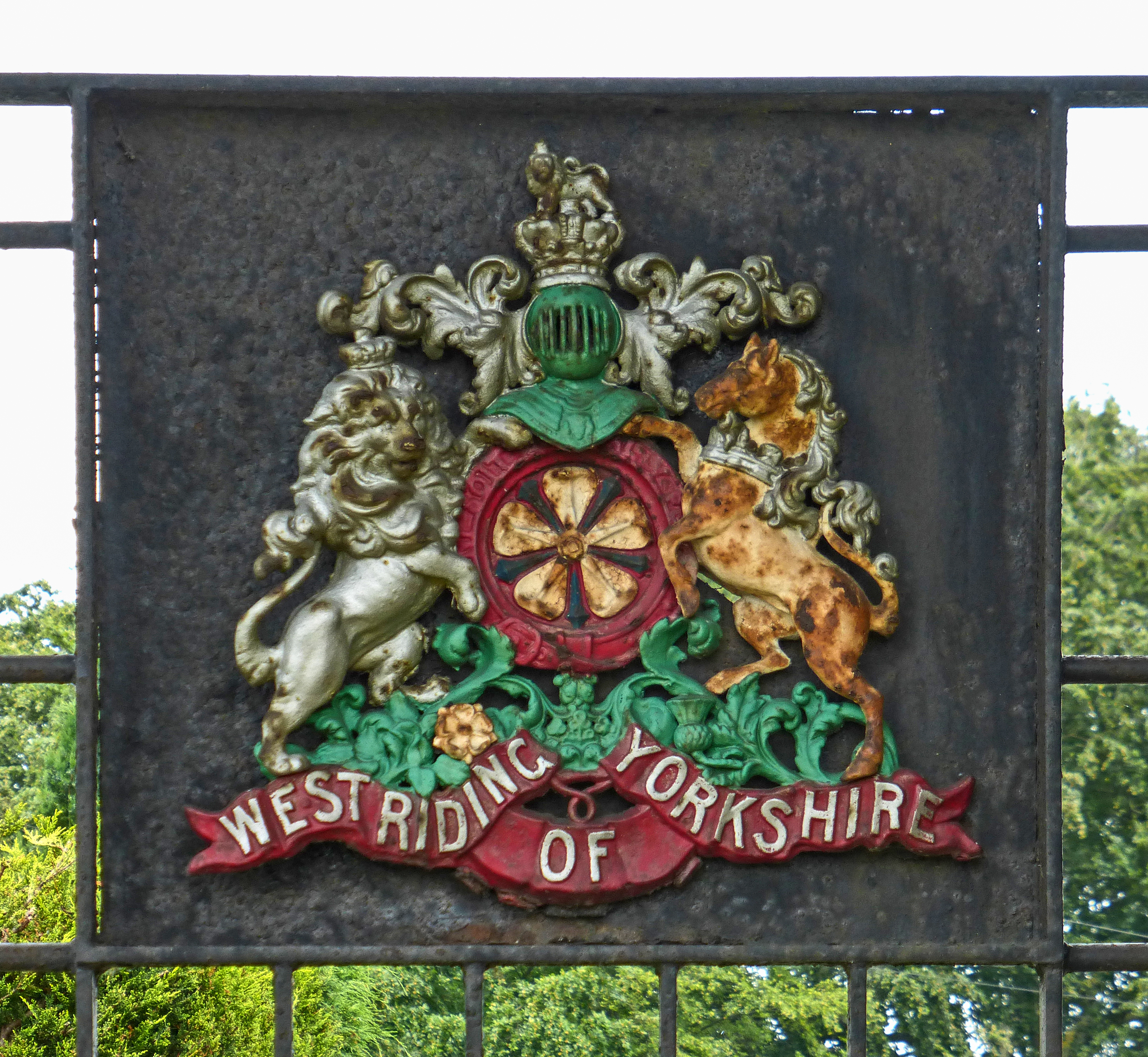
A variation of the West Riding's coat of arms seen in Wetherby, now in West Yorkshire

The West Riding encompassed 1,771,562 acres (7,169.26 km^{2}) from Sheffield in the south to Sedbergh in the north and from Dunsop Bridge in the west to Adlingfleet in the east.

The southern industrial district, considered in the broadest application of the term, extended northward from Sheffield to Skipton and eastward from Sheffield to Doncaster, covering less than one-half of the riding. Within this district were Barnsley, Batley, Bradford, Brighouse, Dewsbury, Doncaster, Halifax, Huddersfield, Keighley, Leeds, Morley, Ossett, Pontefract, Pudsey, Rotherham, Sheffield, Todmorden (partly in Lancashire until 1888, when fully incorporated into Yorkshire) and Wakefield. Major centres elsewhere in the riding included Harrogate and Ripon.

Within the industrial region, other urban districts included Bingley, Bolton on Dearne, Castleford, Cleckheaton, Elland, Featherstone, Handsworth, Hoyland Nether, Liversedge, Mexborough, Mirfield, Normanton, Rawmarsh, Rothwell, Saddleworth, Shipley, Skipton, Sowerby Bridge, Stanley, Swinton, Thornhill, Wath-upon-Dearne, Wombwell and Worsborough. Outside the industrial region were Goole, Ilkley, Knaresborough, Otley and Selby. The West Riding also contained a large rural area to the north including part of the Yorkshire Dales National Park (the remainder of the park being in the North Riding).

=== Administrative county ===
The administrative county was formed in 1889 by the Local Government Act 1888, and covered the historic West Riding except for the larger urban areas, which were county boroughs with the powers of both a municipal borough and a county council. Initially there were five in number: Bradford, Leeds, Huddersfield, Halifax, and Sheffield. The City of York (also a county borough) was included in the county for census and lieutenancy purposes. The number of county boroughs increased over the years; Rotherham gained this status in 1902, Barnsley and Dewsbury in 1913, Wakefield in 1915 and Doncaster in 1927. The boundaries of existing county boroughs were also widened.

Beginning in 1898, the West Riding County Council was based at the County Hall in Wakefield, which was inherited by the West Yorkshire Metropolitan County Council in 1974.

The Local Government Act 1888 included the entirety of Todmorden with the West Riding administrative county, and also in its lieutenancy area ("county"), though the postal address for Todmorden was Lancashire. Other boundary changes in the county included the expansion of the county borough of Sheffield southward into areas historically in Derbyshire such as Dore.

Fingerposts erected in the West Riding until the mid-1960s had a distinctive style. At the top of the post was a roundel in the form of a hollow circle with a horizontal line across the middle, displaying "Yorks W.R.", the name of the fingerpost's location, and a grid reference. Other counties, apart from Dorset, did not display a grid reference and did not have a horizontal bar through the roundel. From 1964, many fingerposts were replaced by ones in the modern style, but some of the old style still survive within the West Riding boundaries.

By 1971 1,924,853 people (or 50.85% of the West Riding's population) lived in the administrative county, against 1,860,435 (or 49.15%) in the ten county boroughs.

Settlements of The West Riding
All cities in the historic West Riding appear in bold, as well as:
The settlements now in the ceremonial county of West Yorkshire - Blue
The settlements now in the ceremonial county of South Yorkshire - Red
The settlements now in the ceremonial county of North Yorkshire - Orange
The settlements now in the administrative East Riding - Green
The Ainsty of York - White
The settlements now in different administrative counties - Purple

=== Divisions ===
==== Ancient riding ====
===== Earlier =====
In the Domesday Book of 1086 they were eleven wapentakes; these were as follows:

Domesday name	Later name	Also known as/ division names	Other status post-Domesday	
Agbrigg			Agbrigg and Morley (temporarily)	
Morley		Blackston Edge, Bradfordale or Sowerbyshire	Agbrigg and Morley (temporarily)	
Ainsty	Ainsty of York		Joined the City of York (quasi-outside the Riding system) in the 15th century	
Barkston	Barkston Ash		Jointly known as Elmet	
Skyrack	Skyrack Upper	Airedale	Jointly known as Elmet	
Skyrack	Skyrack Lower	Airedale	Jointly known as Elmet	
Burghshire (of Aldborough)	Claro Upper	Wharfedale, Nidderdale, of Knaresborough, Riponshire or Kirbyshire	Liberty and Honour	
Burghshire (of Aldborough)	Claro Lower	Wharfedale, Nidderdale, of Knaresborough, Riponshire or Kirbyshire	Liberty and Honour	
Strafforth	Strafforth and Tickhill Upper	of Mexborough, of Tickhill, Hallam or Hallamshire	Liberty or Honour	
Strafforth	Strafforth or Tickhill Lower	of Mexborough, of Tickhill, Hallam or Hallamshire	Liberty or Honour	
Craven/ Cravenshire	Staincliffe West	Ribblesdale or Bowland	Temporarily merged into Staincliffe and Ewecross	Honour
Craven/ Cravenshire	Staincliffe East	Staincliffe, of Skipton or Craven	Temporarily merged into Staincliffe and Ewecross	Honour
Ewecross			Temporarily merged into Staincliffe and Ewecross	
Osgoldcross		Marshland	Liberty	
Staincross				

==== Later ====
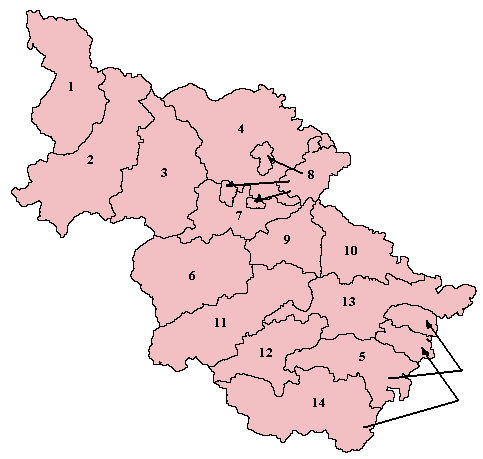
Wapentakes

In the end of regular use, the wapentakes were:

1. Ewcross
2. Staincliffe West
3. Staincliffe East
4. Claro Lower
5. Strafforth and Tickhill Lower
6. Morley
7. Skyrack Upper
8. Claro Upper
9. Skyrack Lower
10. Barkston Ash
11. Agbrigg
12. Staincross
13. Osgoldcross
14. Strafforth and Tickhill Upper

=== Riding as a county ===
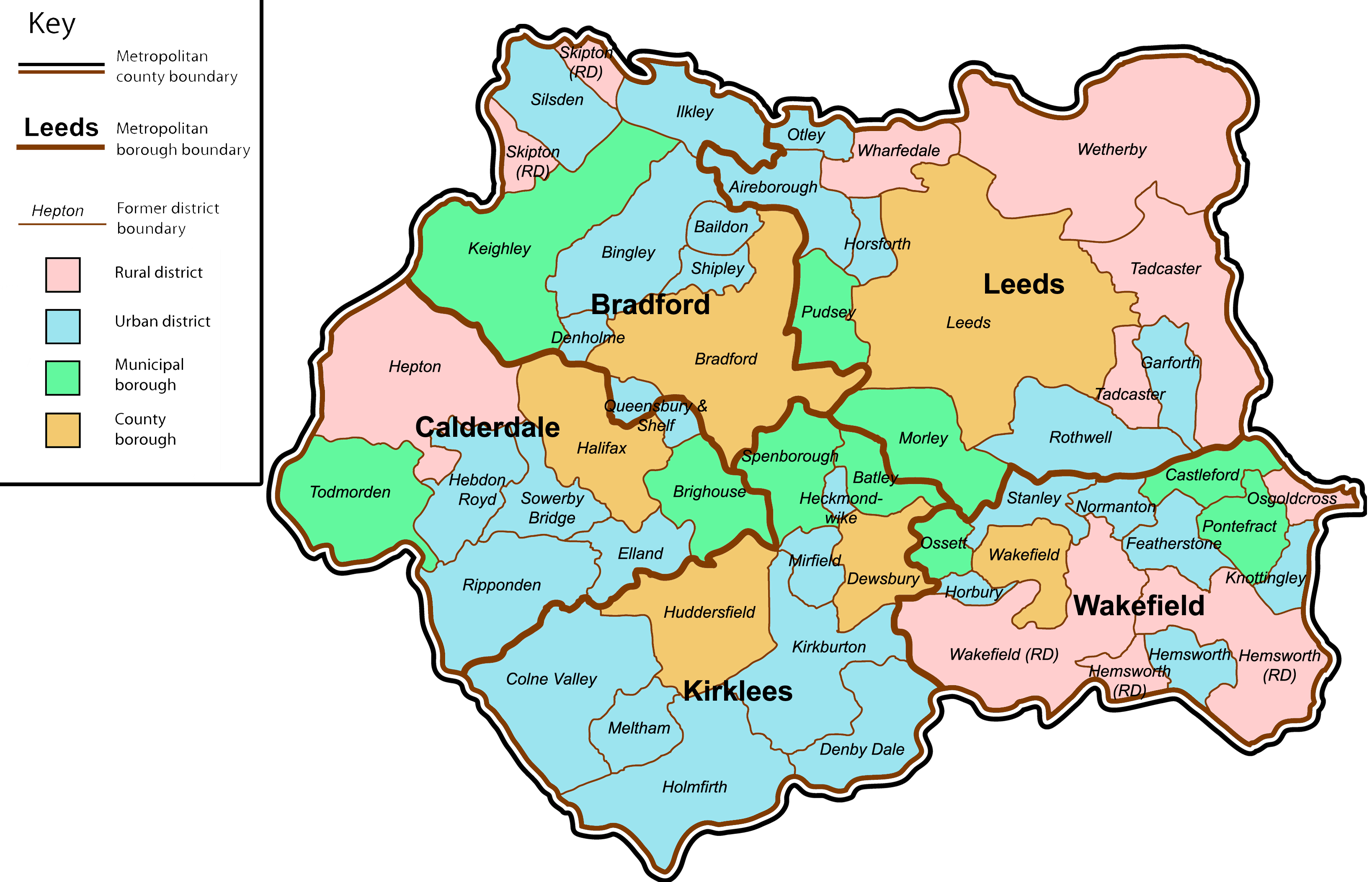
The system of districts and boroughs of the West Riding which formed West Yorkshire

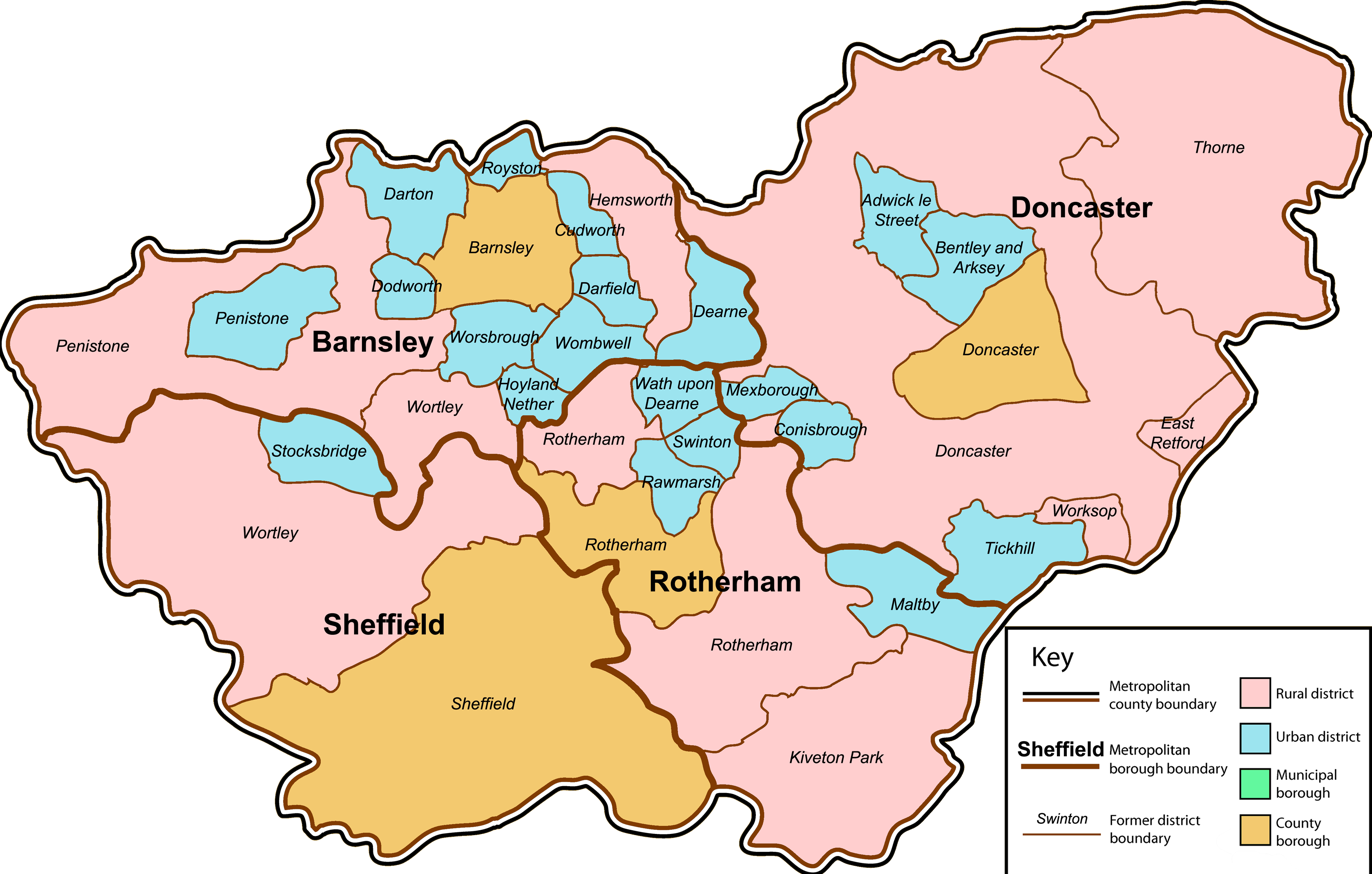
The system of districts and boroughs of the West Riding which formed South Yorkshire

During the West Riding's time as a county; rural districts, Urban districts and municipal boroughs were under the administrative county while county boroughs were in the wider geographic county.

== Current usage ==
The Official West Riding flag registered with the Flag Institute (2013)

The term "West Riding" continues to be used by organisations based in the historic area of the riding, such as the West Riding Sailing Club, the Ramblers, the West Riding County Football Association, and the Freemasons. It is also retained in the name of some British Army squadrons, such as the 106 (West Riding) Field Squadron, and some historical re-enactment groups. A flag designed to represent the West Riding was registered with the Flag Institute charity in 2013.

== See also ==
- Custos Rotulorum of the West Riding of Yorkshire – List of Keepers of the Rolls
- List of Lords Lieutenant of the West Riding
