= Horbury Town Hall =

Municipal building in Horbury, West Yorkshire, England

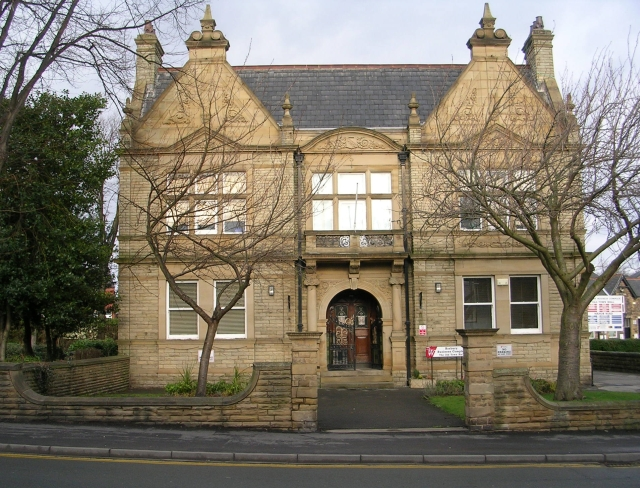
- Horbury Town Hall

- Shown in West Yorkshire
- 53.6612°N 1.5600°W
- Location: Westfield Road, Horbury

History
- Built: 1903

Site notes
- Architect(s): Walter Hanstock & Son
- Architectural style: Renaissance style

Horbury Town Hall is a former municipal building in Westfield Road, Horbury, West Yorkshire, England. The structure, which is now used as business centre, is a locally listed building.

== History ==
Following significant population growth, largely associated with the yarn spinning and cloth manufacturing industries, Horbury became an urban district in 1894. In this context the new civic leaders decided to procure a town hall: the site they selected, on the north-east side of Westfield Road, was occupied by a private house rented by a builder, William Thickett. The foundation stone for the new building was laid by the chairman of the council, Joshua Harrop, on 30 July 1902. It was designed by Walter Hanstock & Son in the Renaissance style, built by Henry Fallas & Sons in buff brick with stone dressings at a cost of £6,100 and was officially opened by Harrop on 2 October 1903.

The design involved a symmetrical main frontage with three bays facing onto Westfield Road; the central bay featured a round headed porch with wrought-iron gates and a stone surround flanked by Ionic order columns surmounted by brackets supporting an entablature and a balcony. On the first floor, there was a mullioned and transomed window and, at roof level, there was an entablature and segmental pediment containing a coat of arms in the tympanum. The outer bays were fenestrated by pairs of sash windows on the ground floor and by mullioned and transomed windows on the first floor; the gables above, which contained panels bearing carvings, were flanked and surmounted by pedestals. Internally, the principal rooms were the council chamber and the offices of the town clerk, the surveyor and the treasurer. At the rear of the site, stables and garaging were erected for the council's horses, carts and road rollers.

A brass plaque was erected in the town hall to commemorate the lives of local people who had died in the Second Boer War. A stained glass window was also installed in memory of a former lord of the manor, Sir Gervase Clifton, who, in 1653, had transferred a tract of common land into a trust for the benefit of the people of the town: located to the north-west of the town hall, it was landscaped in 1904 and initially became known as Sparrow Park and later as the Horbury Memorial Park. A war memorial, in the form of a pillar with a flared capstone sitting on a pedestal, was installed in the park after the First World War.

The building continued to serve as the headquarters of Horbury Urban District Council for much of the 20th century, but ceased to be the local seat of government when the enlarged Wakefield District Council was formed in 1974. It was subsequently converted for use as a business centre.
