= Sowerbyshire =

Sowerbyshire (/ˈsoʊərbi-, ˈsaʊərbi-/), formerly a small shire of northern England in Norman times, was the name given the region surrounding the West Yorkshire town of Sowerby. It was administered as a graveship (one of twelve subdivisions of the manor of Wakefield) during the 14th and 15th centuries; court leet for the subinfeudatory manors, such as Halifax and Wadsworth, met at Sowerby or Halifax from 1433, before 1430 it met at Wakefield. The shire was designated a Royal Chase and may have once have been of strategic importance, Sowerby being the site of a Norman motte-and-bailey castle, unusual for this part of England.
