= Horbury Academy =

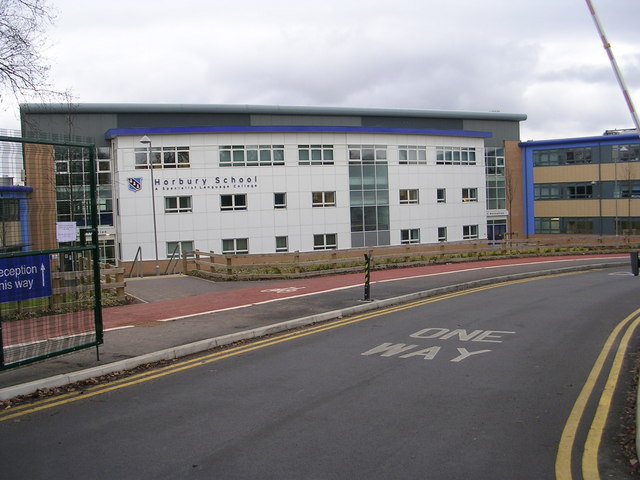
- New school building (2010)

Location
- Wakefield Road; Horbury; City of Wakefield, West Yorkshire, WF4 5HE; England; 53.6614°N 1.5473°W

Information
- Type: Academy
- Local authority: Wakefield
- Department for Education URN: 138707 Tables
- Ofsted: Reports
- Headteacher: Mr Ash
- Gender: Mixed
- Age: 11 to 16
- Website: http://www.horburyacademy.com/

Horbury Academy (formerly Horbury School) is a mixed secondary school located in Horbury in the City of Wakefield, West Yorkshire, England.

The school previously held specialist status as a Language College, and a new building was completed in 2009 on the same site as the old one. In September 2012 Horbury School Converted to academy status and was renamed Horbury Academy. The school offers GCSEs and BTECs as programmes of study for pupils.

== Notable former pupils ==
- Lee Beachill, squash player
- James Bree, footballer
- Ryan, Gary and Ross Jarman, founding members of The Cribs
