= St Peter and St Leonard's Church, Horbury =

Horbury Church
- The Parish Church of St Peter, Horbury
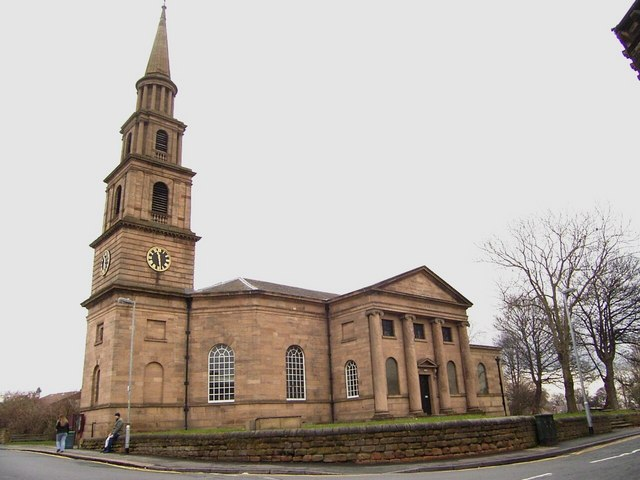
- Horbury Parish Church
- Horbury Church
- 53.6610°N 1.5548°W
- OS grid reference: SE 29515 18368
- Location: Horbury, West Yorkshire
- Country: England
- Denomination: Church of England
- Churchmanship: Traditional Anglo-Catholic
- Website: Parish website

History
- Status: Parish Church
- Founded: Anglo Saxon origins
- Dedication: St Peter and St Leonard
- Consecrated: 1794 (present church)

Architecture
- Heritage designation: Grade I listed building
- Architect: John Carr
- Style: Georgian (architecture)
- Groundbreaking: 1790
- Completed: 1794
- Construction cost: £8,000

Specifications
- Materials: Sandstone

Administration
- Province: Province of York
- Diocese: Diocese of Leeds
- Parish: Horbury

Clergy
- Bishop: The Rt. Revd. Tony Robinson (AEO)
- Vicar(s): Fr. Christopher Johnson, SSC

St Peter and St Leonard's Church, Horbury is in Horbury, West Yorkshire, England. It is an active Church of England parish church and part of the Wakefield deanery in the archdeaconry of Pontefract, diocese of Wakefield and commonly known as St Peter's. It is on the site of a Norman church built in about 1100, and probably an Anglo-Saxon church before that. The present church, by local architect John Carr, was completed in 1794. It is a prominent local landmark and has been designated a Grade I listed building by English Heritage.

== History ==
Horbury was a chapelry of All Saints Church in Wakefield and has probably had a chapel since before the Norman Conquest in 1066. Earl Warenne, Lord of the Manor of Wakefield built a church in the Norman style in 1106. It had a tower, nave and small chancel.

In 1509 William Amyas of Horbury Hall left money to the "belles of Horbury Church". The "Devil's Knell" was tolled after midnight on Christmas morning, the tenor bell tolled for an hour, then four fours were struck followed by a strike for every year since the birth of Christ. This tradition was discontinued but survives in Dewsbury.

The parish registers record the burial of two soldiers following the Battle of Wakefield.

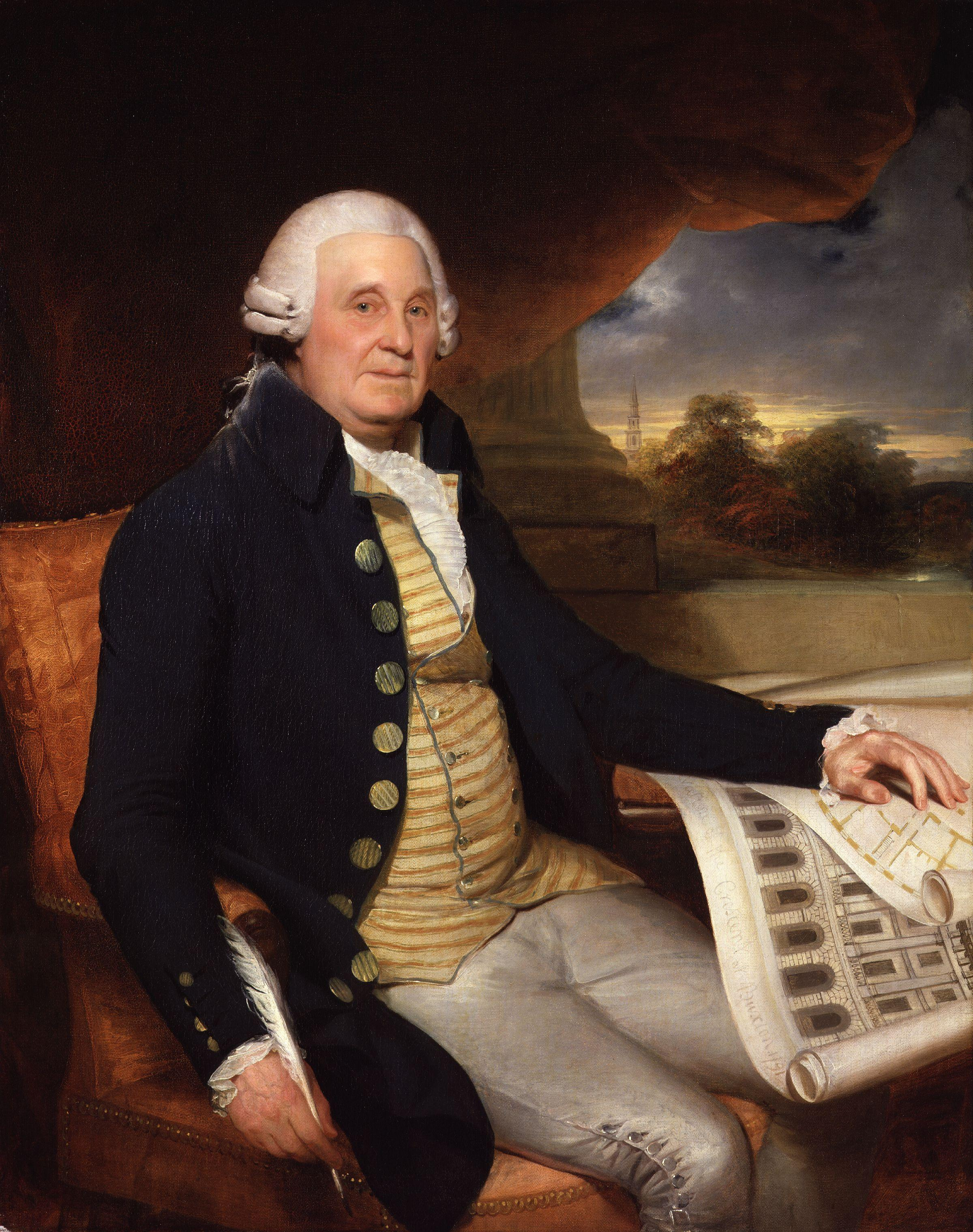
Portrait of John Carr by William Beechey, 1791. The spire of the church can be seen in the distance

In the late 1780s John Carr, son of a Horbury stonemason and former Lord Mayor of York, offered to build a new church at his own expense. It cost £8,000 (equivalent to £1,040,000 in 2025}), plus a further £2,000 for the bells and organ (equivalent to £260,000 in 2025}). The foundation stone for the new church was laid in 1790 and it was opened in 1794.

The vestry was built in 1884. The rotunda and spire were rebuilt 1899, when more bells were added. A south chapel commemorating the First World War was added in 1920.

A mission church, now St John's Horbury Bridge, was started in a room in what is now the Post Office in 1864. The curate, Sabine Baring-Gould wrote the hymn "Onward Christian Soldiers" in 1865 for the Whitsun procession to Horbury Church. Another mission was set up at Horbury Junction in 1887 and replaced by St Mary's Church in 1893.

=== Present day ===
The parish stands in the Anglo-Catholic tradition of the Church of England. As it rejects the ordination of women, the parish receives Alternative Episcopal Oversight from the Bishop of Wakefield (currently Tony Robinson).

== Structure ==
The church is built in local ashlar sandstone with a grey slate roof in the Classical style.

=== Exterior ===
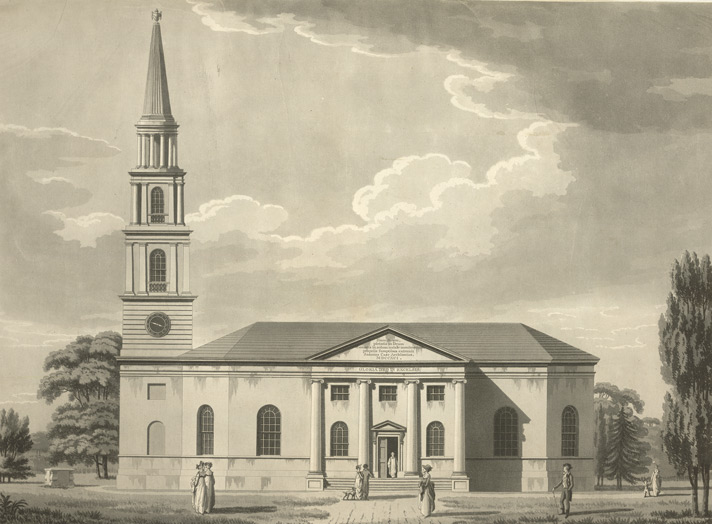
Aquatint of Horbury Church from 1791

The church has a square west tower in four reducing stages surmounted by a colonnaded rotunda with a small fluted, conical spire. The first stage is constructed of smooth ashlar stone with round-arched and square blind windows. The second stage is rusticated with a clock to the four faces. A round-arched bell-chamber is on the third stage and the fourth stage is similar with columns.

The five-bay nave has octagonal ends and three-bay north and south wings. The nave has tall, round-arched windows. The south wing has four Ionic columns supporting a pediment in the form of a portico over a central double-door which also has a pediment. There are round-arched windows at ground-floor level and square windows above. The north wing is plain with central entrance with an architrave and pediment. The vestry is to the north-east and has a round-arched entrance and door flanked by tapering pilasters supporting a frieze and cornice. There is a chapel to south-east.

The pediment is inscribed: HANC AEDEM SACRAH PIETATIS IN DEUM ET AMORIS IN SOLUM NATALE MONIMENTUM PROPRIIS SUMPTIBUS EXTRUXIT JOANNES CARR ARCHITECTUS ANNO CHRISTI MDCCXC1 GLORIA DEO IN EXCELSIS

=== Interior ===
Inside, the bay divisions are marked by fluted Corinthian pilasters. A west gallery with a panelled front containing the organ is supported by Tuscan columns. The shallow vaulted ceiling has an elaborate frieze terminating in shallow segmental coving.

=== Fixtures and fittings ===
The tower contains eight bells, five cast in 1792 by Thomas Mears, and three in 1899 by Mears & Stainbank at the Whitechapel Bell Foundry.

The church is furnished with straight-backed panelled pews with rounded ends. The communion rail is made from green/brown marble. An octagonal panelled pulpit dated 1917 was given in memory of Richard and Martha Ann Popplewell.

There are memorials to John Carr and his family in the chancel. Carr was buried in a vault along with some of his nephew's family – John Carr of Carr Lodge, Horbury, his wife, Hannah Maria (Marsden) and one of their granddaughters, that had been forgotten until its discovery in 1950, when repairs were made to the vestry floor.

Above the door contains a Funerary hatchment for John Carr of Carr Lodge. This contains a black dexter for John Carr and a white one for his wife, Hannah Maria (Marsden) daughter of William Marsden of Wakefield.

== See also ==
- Grade I listed churches in West Yorkshire
- Listed buildings in Horbury and South Ossett
