= William Sykes (businessman) =

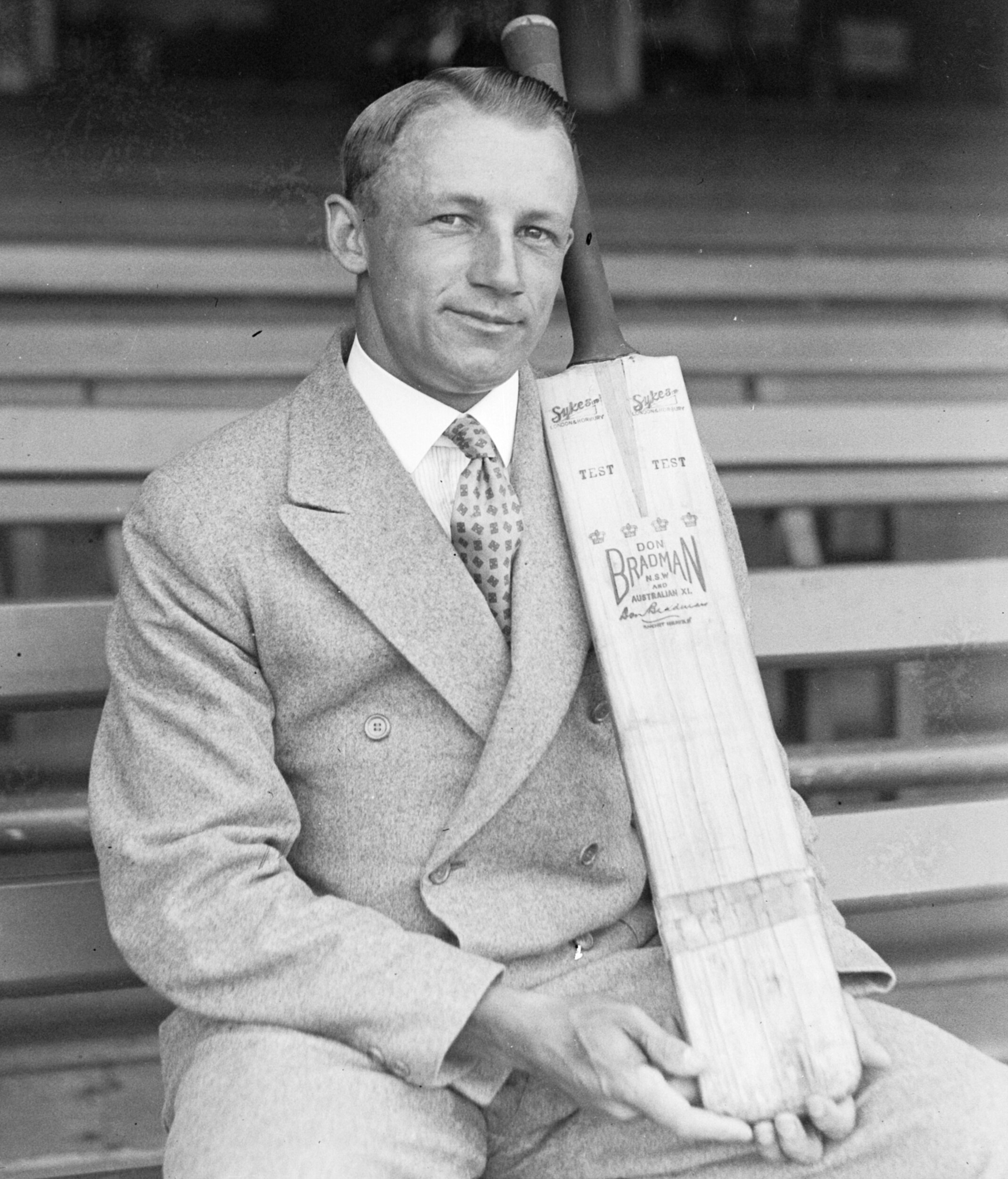
Donald Bradman with a Wm. Sykes cricket bat

William Sykes (1852–1910) was an English businessman. Sykes was just 23 when, against the advice of his father he married and then with his own and his new wife's savings purchased a saddler business in Horbury, England, in about 1874. He married Louisa Abstemia Crabtree (1850–1928) in 1874.

The business prospered and a few years later added footballs to the other leather goods it was making. The Sykes Zig-zag branded football was used in many leading events including the FA Cup finals of 1936, 1937, 1939 and 1946.

Sykes subsequently expanded his business by dealing in cricket bats, before moving into their manufacture. Donald Bradman, widely acknowledged as the greatest Test batsman of all time, used bats produced by Sykes throughout his career. in 1929, shortly after Bradman scored the then highest First-Class innings of 340 while playing for New South Wales at the Sydney Cricket Ground, Sykes signed him up to help promote what became known as the Don Bradman bat, or the Autograph bat.

William Sykes was joined in the business by his sons Henry Osbourne Sykes 1875–1939 married Maud Berry in 1899 and William Oates Sykes 1884–1935 married Ethel May Marshall in 1907. Early in the 20th century, Wm. Sykes & Sons merged with other sporting manufacturers, eventually becoming part of the Slazengers Sykes Gradidge and Ayres organisation.
