= Horbury =

Village in West Yorkshire, England

Coordinates: 53.6595°N 1.5566°W

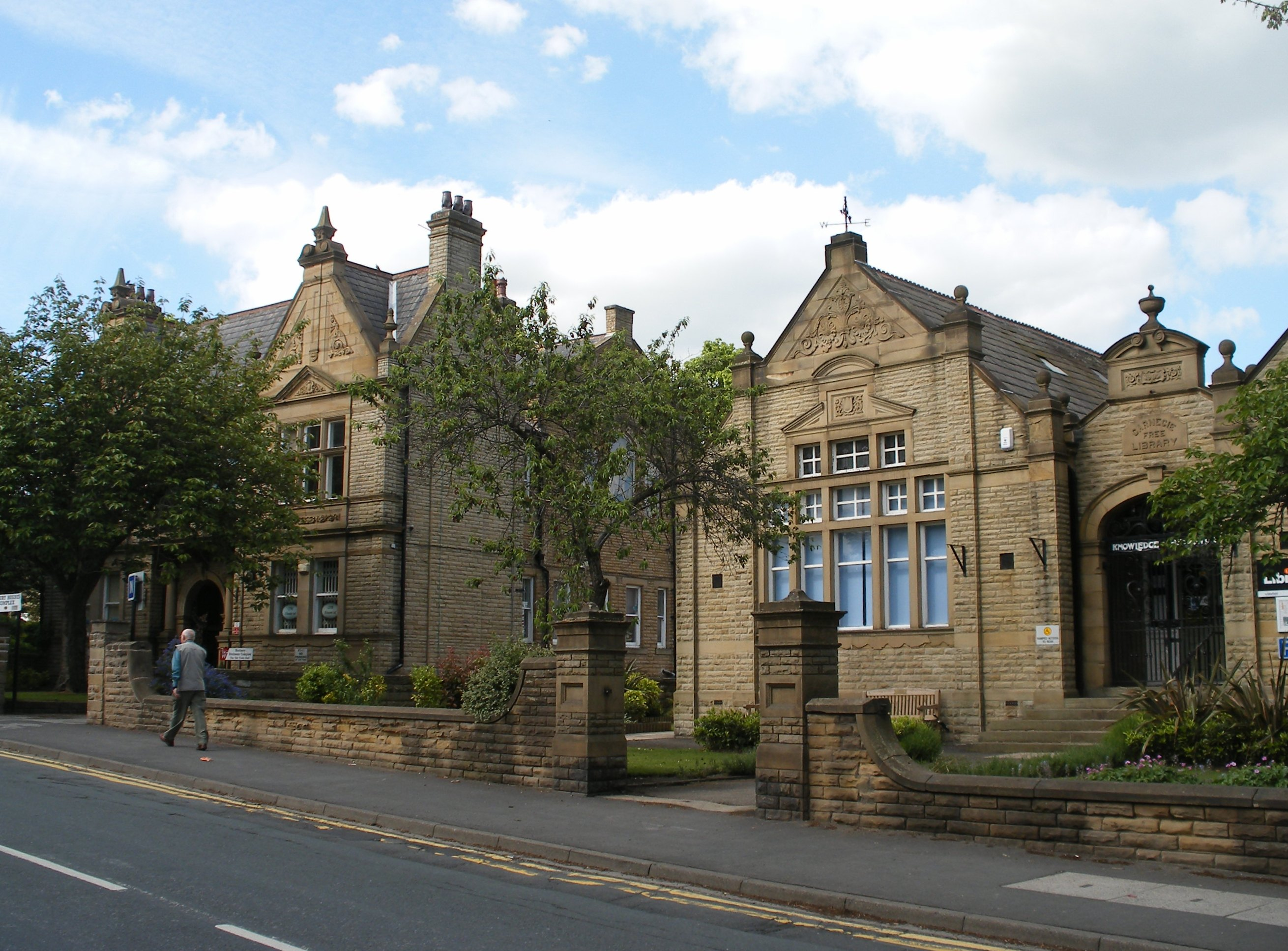
- Horbury Town Hall and Library

- Location within West Yorkshire
- Population: 10,002 (2001)
- OS grid reference: SE294182
- Metropolitan borough: City of Wakefield
- Metropolitan county: West Yorkshire
- Region: Yorkshire and the Humber
- Country: England
- Sovereign state: United Kingdom
- Post town: Wakefield
- Postcode district: WF4
- Dialling code: 01924
- Police: West Yorkshire
- Fire: West Yorkshire
- Ambulance: Yorkshire
- UK Parliament: Ossett and Denby Dale

Horbury is a town in the City of Wakefield in West Yorkshire, England. Historically in the West Riding of Yorkshire, it is situated north of the River Calder about three miles (5 km) south west of Wakefield and two miles (3 km) to the south of Ossett. It includes the outlying areas of Horbury Bridge and Horbury Junction. At the 2001 census the Horbury and South Ossett ward of Wakefield Metropolitan District Council had a population of 10,002. At the 2011 census the population was 15,032. Old industries include woollens, engineering and building wagons for the railways. Horbury forms part of the Heavy Woollen District.

== History ==
=== Toponymy ===
The name Horbury is attested in 1086 as (H)orberie. It is derived from Old English horu 'dirty land' and burh (in its dative form byrig), which translates as 'filthy fortification' or 'stronghold on muddy land'. Other spellings include Orberie, Horbiry and Horberie. The name possibly referred to a fortification near an old fording point of the River Calder.

=== Manor ===
The settlement predates the Domesday Book of 1086 in which Horbury and Crigglestone, on the south side of the River Calder, were the only parts of the Manor of Wakefield not described as "waste". The survey recorded about 40 people and four ox-drawn ploughs in 'Orberie' and 'Crigeston' combined. About 400 acres (1.6 km^{2}) of land were in cultivation and much woodland. Horbury had a church dating from about 1106 which was a daughter church of the church in Wakefield and possibly replaced an earlier Saxon church. The Norman church had a tower, nave and chancel.

The Manor of Wakefield was given by the crown to the Earls Warenne in 1106 and was held by them until 1359. Sir Robert de Horbiry and Sir John de Horbiry were stewards to the Earl de Warenne, who granted Sir John the village of Horbury and its lands for life. After the death of Sir John de Horbury in 1306, it became one of the constituent 'graveships' of the Manor of Wakefield.

The oldest surviving house in the town is Horbury Hall in Church Street, built by Ralph Amyas, deputy steward of the Manor of Wakefield. It has been dated by dendrochronology to 1474. Other old buildings include the tithe barn. The land in Horbury was divided into three great fields, Northfield, Southfield and Westfield, and remains of medieval ridge and furrow of strip cultivation are visible in Carr Lodge Park.

=== Horbury Bridge ===
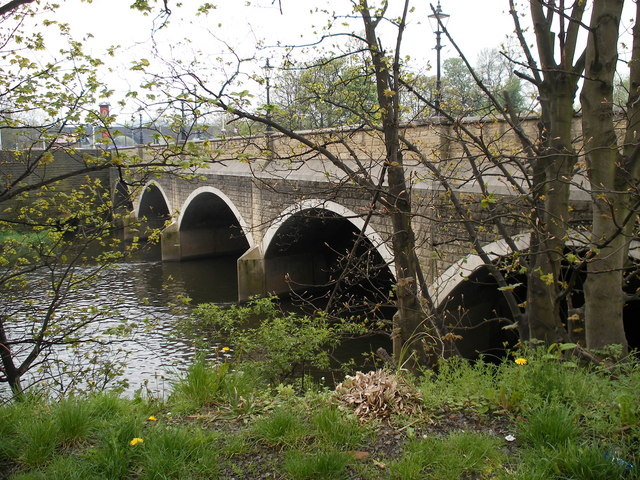
Bridge over the River Calder

A wooden bridge spanned the River Calder on the road from Wakefield to Huddersfield in the 15th century. Money for its upkeep was left in local wills dated 1404 and 1492, a custom that continued into the 16th century. A stone-arched bridge that replaced the wooden structure in the 17th century lasted until it partly collapsed in 1918. A new bridge was completed in 1930 and was repaired in 1991 at a cost of £2 million. Horbury Bridge was flooded after heavy rain in 1946.

=== Industrial history ===
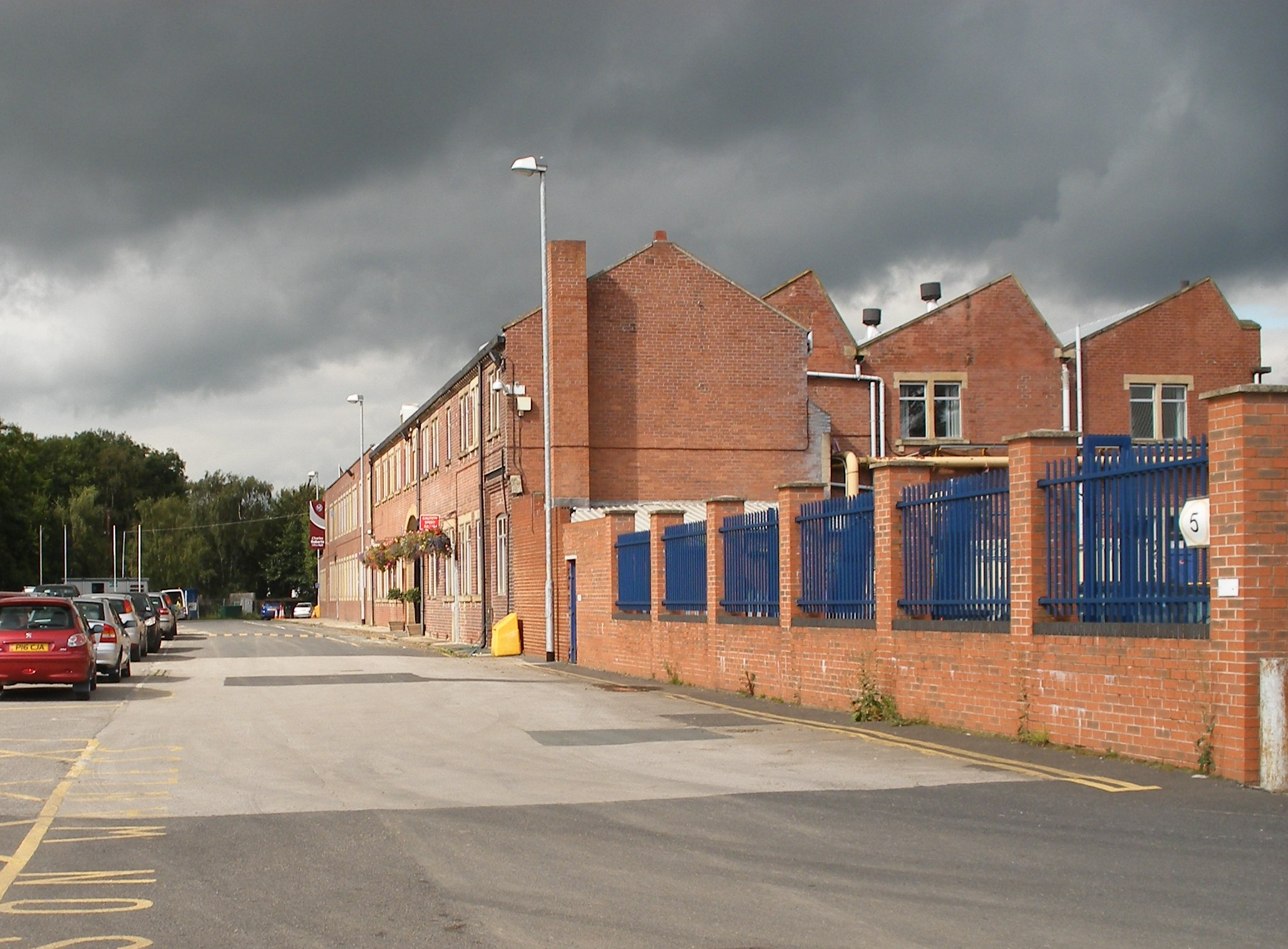
Charles Roberts Works

Wool spinning and cloth manufacture were important originally as cottage industries. At the start of the Industrial Revolution steam engines were installed at Race's Mill in Dudfleet and Foster's Mill on Engine Lane in 1795. Resistance to the implementation of new textile machinery and the factory system was shown when Luddites, who blamed the new factories for depriving weavers from earning a living in a time of widespread hunger and poverty, destroyed Fosters Mill.

Albion Mills and Millfield Mills were built in the 1870s. William Sykes's sports goods works, which became part of Slazengers, was established at about this time. Slazenger had four factories which produced sports equipment. Since the factories closed the name is preserved in Slazengers Sports and Social Club, which has facilities and floodlit grounds for many different sporting activities.

Charles Roberts (1831–1892) who described himself as a joiner, moved the Buffer and Wagon Works he had established on Ings Road, Wakefield to a site at Horbury Junction in 1873. Between 1901 and 1956 the company built 110,000 railway wagons of varying types and by 1945 Charles Roberts and Co.'s works covered 45 acres including the adjacent site of the Horbury Junction Iron Company which it had taken over in 1923. During the First World War the firm was among the first to employ women who were employed to forge shell covers. During the Second World War, the wagon works was used for armament manufacture, and made 1,300 Churchill tanks, half a million naval shells and one and a half million trench mortar bombs. The Horbury Junction Iron Company site was used to build tram bodies for Blackpool and Sheffield trams.

The works later became owned by Procor and then Bombardier Inc. The last vehicles constructed at the site were Bombardier Voyager trains, the plant closed in 2005; the engineering company Eddison & Wanless now occupies the site.

In 1905, Richard Sutcliffe (1849–1930), who had worked as part-time manager at Hartley Bank Colliery across the valley in Netherton, opened his Universal Works on the site of the old dye house mill on the Horbury-Wakefield boundary in 1905 and started to manufacture conveyor belts and mining machinery. In 1972 the company employed 742 people at its Horbury site.

== Governance ==
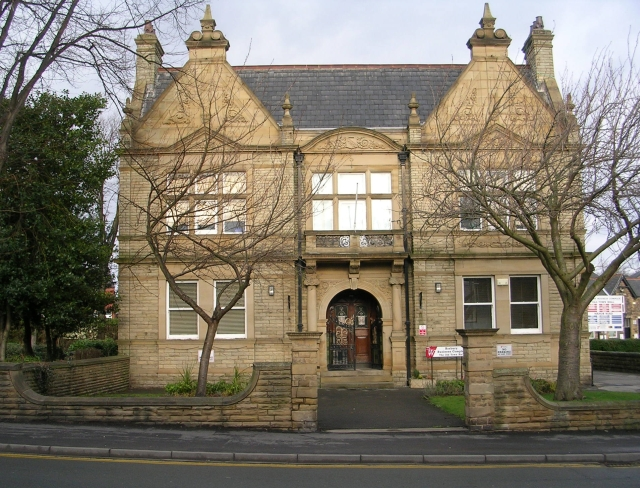
Horbury Town Hall

Historically Horbury was a chapelry in the parish of Wakefield, in the lower division of the Wapentake of Agbrigg and Morley and part of the West Riding of Yorkshire. Following the implementation of the Poor Law Amendment Act 1834, Horbury became one of the 17 constituent parishes of the Wakefield Poor Law Union formed in 1837. Horbury Town Hall was commissioned by the Urban District Council; its foundation stone was laid by Joshua Harrop on 30 July 1902 and it was built by Henry Fallas & Sons of Horbury.

== Geography ==
Horbury encompasses the neighbourhoods of Horbury Bridge, named after the crossing of the River Calder and Horbury Junction, named after the railway junction. It covers an area of 1,162 acres (470 ha). The River Calder flows generally west to east in a wide valley across the south of the town alongside the Calder and Hebble Navigation which made the river navigable to Sowerby Bridge. The town centre is on a hill on the north side of the River Calder and most of the land slopes towards the river. The A642 Wakefield to Huddersfield road bypasses the town to the south of the town centre with a branch road to Horbury Junction. The B6128 goes through the town centre and connects with Ossett to the north. The M1 motorway passes to the east of the town with the nearest access at J40 A638 in Ossett.

Location grid

== Demography ==
In 2008 Horbury had a largely white population compared with Yorkshire and the Humber.

Horbury Compared in 2008
2008 UK Population Estimates	Horbury	Yorkshire and the Humber	England
Total population	9,998	5,213,200	51,446,200
White	98.6%	90.6%	88.2%
Asian	0.5%	5.7%	5.7%
Black	0.1%	1.3%	2.8%

=== Population change ===
The population of Horbury in 2001 was 10,002

Population growth in Horbury from 1881 to 1961
Year	1881	1891	1901	1911	1921	1931	1951	1961
Population	5,050	5,673	6,736	7,509	7,829	7,791	7,965	8,642
Horbury CP/Ch

== Transport ==
A network of local buses, coordinated by West Yorkshire Metro connects Horbury with Wakefield, Dewsbury, Ossett, and Huddersfield. The M1 motorway to the east of the town is accessed at junctions 39 at Durkar and 40 at Ossett.

Proposals were made for a railway through Horbury in the 1830s and an Act of Parliament was passed for the Manchester and Leeds Railway engineered by George Stephenson in 1836. Horbury has had three stations, Horbury & Ossett at Horbury Bridge of 1840, Horbury Junction on Green Lane of 1853 and Millfield Road at Horbury Junction opened in 1927. All are closed.

== Media ==
Local news and television programmes are provided by BBC Yorkshire and ITV Yorkshire. Television signals are received from the Emley Moor TV transmitter. Local radio stations are BBC Radio Leeds, Heart Yorkshire, Capital Yorkshire, Hits Radio West Yorkshire, Greatest Hits Radio Yorkshire, and Rhubarb Radio, a community based station. The town is served the local newspaper, Wakefield Express and The Horbury Ossett Community News which is a free local weekly paper printed and distributed throughout the town and Ossett.

== Education ==
Horbury Town School on Tithe Barn Street was enlarged in 1789 but it is not known when it was built. By 1870 there were 113 pupils paying fees of 3d to 6d weekly. It closed in 1886. The "Gaskell School" was built on New Road in 1842 by Daniel Gaskell of Lupset Hall. It was used until 1887. St Peter's Church of England School was founded in 1849 close to the church. It was replaced by the present school in the early 1980s. In September 2010 St Peter's Junior School amalgamated with Clifton Infant School to form a new primary school. A new building is proposed to be built on the current St Peter's site with a completion date of September 2012.

Horbury Council School catering for all age groups on Northfield Lane was opened in 1913 becoming Horbury County Secondary Modern in 1952. The infant school remained on the site and the junior school moved to the Wesleyan School at Horbury Junction. In 1962 secondary pupils moved to a new school. The Northfield Lane school became Horbury County Junior School and Horbury County Infant School. After a fire in 2000 and a £1m upgrade the schools amalgamated, becoming Horbury Primary School in 2002.

Horbury Academy (formerly Horbury School) caters for pupils aged 11 to 16 in a new building completed in 2009 on the same site as the old one.

== Religion ==
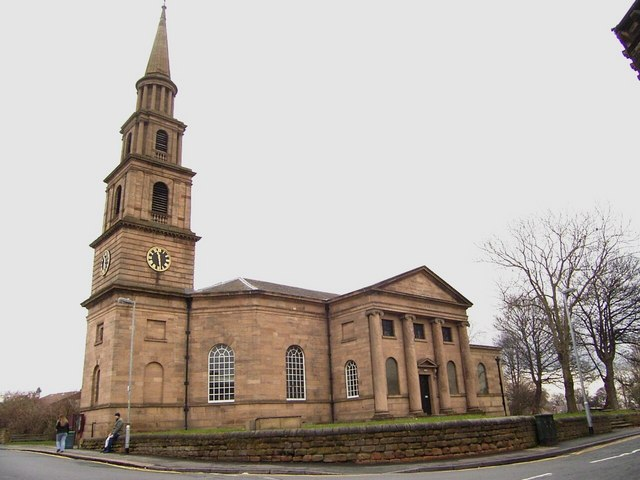
St Peter and St Leonard's Church

Horbury had a chapel of ease to the Church of All Saints in Wakefield, from before the time of the Domesday Book. The chapel was replaced by a Norman chapel with a nave and tower that stood until it was replaced by the present church in 1790. St Peter and St Leonard's Church, the parish church, was designed by John Carr, the Horbury-born architect who built it in the Georgian neo-classical style between 1790 and 1794 at a cost to himself of £8,000. He is buried in a vault beneath the north aisle.

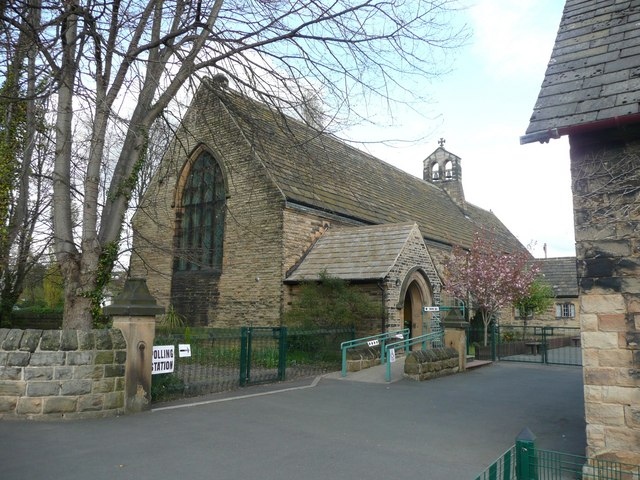
St John's Church, Horbury Bridge

The foundation of St John's Church at Horbury Bridge was in a mission meeting in a room in what is now the hairdressers in 1864. Funds were raised and the church was built with stone from Horbury Quarry in 1884. The curate, Sabine Baring-Gould, wrote the hymn "Onward Christian Soldiers" in 1865 for the Whitsun procession to Horbury Church. Another mission was set up at Horbury Junction in 1887 and St Mary's Church was built in 1893.

A Methodist society was established in Horbury in about 1746, meeting for worship in a private house in Cluntergate. In 1765 the congregation built a chapel seating perhaps 200, also in Cluntergate, adjacent to the house which later became the Working Men's Club. In 1824 a branch of Methodism called the New Connexion erected a chapel in Northgate; the Society was short-lived but the building survives to this day - as a private house. The Primitive Methodists built their first chapel in Horbury in 1841 in High Street, and four years later the Wesleyans built a chapel on the adjoining plot to replace the one in Cluntergate. The Free Methodists built a small chapel in Queen Street in 1857 which served them until 1900, when they built a larger one at the bottom of Bank Street which was bought by Nettleton's in 1958.

The Primitive Methodists built a larger chapel in 1875 on the site of their 1841 building, and the Wesleyans similarly replaced their 1845 chapel in 1884. The Wesleyans had established a mission in Horbury Junction in 1878 and built a chapel there in 1887.

In 1958, many years after Methodist Union, the congregations of the former Wesleyan and Primitive churches amalgamated using the 1884 Wesleyan building for worship and the Primitive's Sunday school for other activities. The congregation of the Horbury Junction chapel joined them in 1969.

In 2012 the 1884 building, having been found to be unsafe, was demolished and a new church was constructed further back from the High Street and connected to the old Sunday School. The new building was formally opened on 10 September 2016.

The Salvation Army corps' former headquarters on Peel Street is now disused, the congregation moving to the Leeds Road, Gawthorpe, Ossett premises. The former Tithe Barn Christian Centre, Westfield Road, is now similarly disused.

== Public services ==
Horbury Library on Westfield Road was built in 1905 with a donation from the Carnegie foundation. It celebrated its centenary in 2005 with the making of a community tapestry, which now hangs in the library. Horbury is policed by the West Yorkshire Police force from Ossett Police Station and is within the DA, Wakefield division, which covers the whole district. The statutory emergency fire and rescue service is provided by the West Yorkshire Fire and Rescue Service from Wakefield Fire Station. Hospital services are provided by the Mid Yorkshire Hospitals NHS Trust. Pinderfields Hospital is the nearest hospital with an Accident and Emergency department. Community health services, including GPs, district and community nurses, dentists and pharmacists, are co-ordinated by Wakefield District Primary Care Trust. Waste management is co-ordinated by the local authority. Horbury's distribution network operator for electricity is CE Electric via Yorkshire Electricity. Yorkshire Water manages Wakefield's drinking and waste water with a Waste Water Treatment Works for the Horbury area on Dudfleet Lane.

== Notable people ==
Architect John Carr was born in Horbury in 1723. His nephew bought Sunroyd House in 1789 and renamed it "Carr Lodge". Horbury Bridge is known as the home of Onward, Christian Soldiers, the hymn written by Sabine Baring-Gould, when he was curate of the Horbury Bridge church. Stan Barstow, author of Joby and A Kind of Loving, was born in Horbury. In his autobiography, he said that Ossett and Horbury were the "border country" where the north-west of the coalfield merges with the south-east of the wool towns. William Baines, born in 1899, was a pianist and prolific composer who died in 1922 of tuberculosis; he composed two hundred works, the majority for solo piano.

Two children from Horbury, Christianne and Robert Shepherd, died of carbon monoxide poisoning while on holiday in Corfu in October 2006. Their deaths resulted in changes to health and safety policies in the travel industry. A memorial garden was opened at Horbury Primary School, which they both attended.

== See also ==
- Listed buildings in Horbury and South Ossett
