= Richard Sutcliffe (engineer) =

Irish mining engineer and inventor

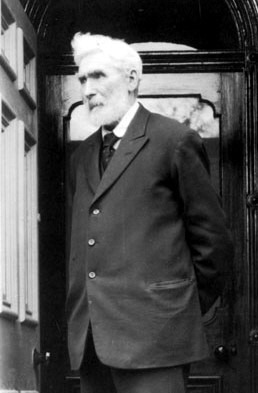
- Born: 26 January 1849; County Tipperary, Ireland
- Died: 23 July 1930 (aged 81); Horbury, England
- Occupations: mining engineer and inventor
- Known for: invented the first coal cutting machine and underground belt conveyor system

Richard Sutcliffe (26 January 1849 – 23 July 1930) was an Irish mining engineer and inventor, active in England who invented the first underground belt conveyor system for mining.

== Early life and family ==
He was born on a farm in Knockatoreen, Grange, County Tipperary on 26 January 1849. His parents were Joseph and Rachel Sutcliffe (née Deeves), who were of English descent originally from Hebden Bridge in West Yorkshire. He had two brother and one sister, and the family were protestant.

Sutcliffe met his wife, Grace Davis, when her father came to Ireland as a pit sinking contractor. They married on 16 May 1874. They had 8 children: Mary Elizabeth, Rachael Davis, Grace Margaret, Richard Joseph, Joseph Davis (died age 22 in 1902), William, James Thomas (died age 12 in 1896), and Alice Clark.

== Career ==
Sutcliffe's father opened a coal yard to supplement their income from the family farm, and Sutcliffe and his brothers all worked there. From 1867, Sutcliffe worked as a clerk at the Wolfhill Colliery in Queens County (now County Laois). He received a Colliery Manager's Certificate of Competency, and was promoted to manager of the mine in 1876, but he left for England to take up a position as surveyor at the Earl of Durham's Warraton Colliery, near Birtley and Chester-le-Street in County Durham later that year. He returned to Ireland between 1878 and 1884 to manage Clogh Colliery, Castlecomer.

The family relocated to Barnsley in 1885 to work in Oaks Colliery. From 1887 he started working on developing a coal cutting machine, patenting his first in 1892, a world's first. In 1905 he invented the world's first underground conveyor belt. This invention revolutionised the mining industry by greatly reducing the amount of labour needed to transport coal. His company, Richard Sutcliffe Ltd., based in Horbury near Wakefield pioneered the manufacture of conveyor belts used in the mining and assembly line industries. His company devised many other types of mining equipment.

After his death, his children took over his business which was later bought out by a larger company.

== Death and legacy ==
Sutcliffe died on 15 July 1930 at his home in Horbury. In 2009, a plaque was erected to him at this address.

== References and further reading ==
- Sutcliffe, Richard Joseph Sutcliffe, Edward D. Richard Sutcliffe: The Pioneer of Underground Belt Conveying. Surrey, UK: R.W. Simpson & Co, 1948
