= Listed buildings in Horbury and South Ossett =

Horbury and South Ossett is a former ward in the metropolitan borough of the City of Wakefield, West Yorkshire, England. The area covered by the ward contains 26 listed buildings that are recorded in the National Heritage List for England. Of these, two are listed at Grade I, the highest of the three grades, and the others are at Grade II, the lowest grade. The area contains the town of Horbury, the south part of the town of Ossett, and the surrounding region. Most of the listed buildings are houses. The other listed buildings include three churches, grave covers in a churchyard, a public house, a former lock-up, a former school, several convent buildings, a gas decontamination centre, and two items on the Calder and Hebble Navigation, a lock, and a lock marker stone.

== Key ==
Grade	Criteria
I	Particularly important buildings of more than special interest
II	Buildings of national importance and special interest

== Buildings ==
Name and location	Photograph	Date	Notes	Grade
Two grave covers 53.66110°N 1.55495°W	—	Medieval	The grave covers are in the churchyard of the Church of St. Peter and St. Leonard, and are not in their original site. They are in stone, and both have a cross carved in relief. The left cover tapers, and the right cover is broken at the bottom.	II
Horbury Hall; 53.66071°N 1.55451°W		1478–92	A timber framed hall house, later encased, at the front partly in stone, and elsewhere in brick, partly rendered, with a stone slate roof. There are two storeys, a two-bay open hall, and a one-bay solar with a chamber beneath. The windows have been inserted later.	I
Shepherds Arms Public House; 53.65907°N 1.55010°W		1538	A private house, later a public house, it has a timber framed core, it was extended in 1593, later encased in stone, and modernised in 1964. The building is stuccoed, and has a stone late roof. There are two storeys and a T-shaped plan, with a front range of three bays, and a gabled wing. Most of the openings are modern replacements.	II
37 and 39 Queen Street, Horbury; 53.66089°N 1.55538°W		16th century (probable)	A pair of shops with a timber framed core, encased in brick in the 19th century, and rendered on the front. There are two storeys, two bays, and a rear wing. In the ground floor are shop fronts, above are altered windows, and at the rear are two casement windows with cambered heads. Inside, there is exposed timber framing.	II
10 and 12 High Street, Horbury; 53.65950°N 1.55415°W		1637	A house, later altered, extended, and used for other purposes. It is in stone, rendered on the front, with quoins, and stone slate roofs with coped gables. There are two storeys, a front range of three bays, and at the rear are wings and an outshut. On the front, at the left, is a doorway with a quoined and moulded surround, and a dated Tudor arched lintel. To the right are inserted shop fronts, and at the rear is a three-light mullioned window.	II
18 and 20 Twitch Hill, Horbury; 53.66093°N 1.55274°W	—	17th century	A house later altered, extended, and divided, it is in stone, partly rendered, with quoins, the left wing is in brick, and the roof is in stone slate with coped gables, There are two storeys and an H-shaped plan, consisting of a front range of two bays, and rear wings, that on the left longer. In the centre are paired doorways with architraves, and the windows are sashes.	II
Sowood Farmhouse; 53.66710°N 1.57048°W	—	1689	The farmhouse is in stone with quoins and a stone slate roof. There are two storeys, three bays, and a rear outshut. Between the house and the outshut is timber framing. The central doorway has a quoined surround, an inscribed and dated Tudor arched lintel, and sunk spandrels. There is one mullioned window with the mullions removed, and the other windows are sashes.	II
33 Tithe Barn Street, Horbury; 53.66108°N 1.55623°W	—	Early 18th century	The house is in rendered stone with a stone slate roof. There are two storeys and three bays. On the front are two doorways, and the windows are mullioned, with some missing millions, and inserted sashes.	II
1 Northfield Lane, Horbury; 53.65864°N 1.54726°W		1739	A stone house with quoins and a stone slate roof. There are two storeys and two bays. The doorway has a lintel inscribed with the date and initials, and an incised sundial. The windows have been altered.	II
47, 49 and 51 Tithe Barn Street, Horbury; 53.66111°N 1.55538°W		Early 18th century	A row of three brick houses with stone slate roofs. There are two storeys, and an H-shaped plan, with a middle range of two bays and outer gabled projecting wings. Most of the windows are sashes. The right bay has a band that carries round into the right return, which has four bays, and in the right bay is a segmental carriage entrance.	II
Carr Lodge; 53.66233°N 1.55109°W		1770–75	A large house, with a rear wing added later, and subsequently used as offices, it is in brick on a stone plinth, with a band, a moulded eaves cornice and a hipped Welsh slate roof. The main block has two storeys and the wing has three. The front is symmetrical with five bays, and in the centre, five steps with swept stone sides and square terminal piers lead up to an ionic portico, and the windows are sashes. The rear wing has four bays, and contains sash windows, Venetian windows, and a tall stair window.	II
Hall Croft; 53.65884°N 1.54913°W		Late 18th century	A country house, later a club, it is in brick, rendered on the sides and rear, with a band, a moulded eaves cornice, and a hipped stone slate roof. There are two storeys, five bays, and a later three-bay rear wing. On the front, over the middle three bays, is a pediment on two small consoles. The central doorway has a moulded architrave, the windows are sashes, and at the rear is a round-arched stair window.	II
Church of St. Peter and St. Leonard, Horbury; 53.66103°N 1.55480°W		1790–94	The church was designed by John Carr in Classical style, a vestry was added in 1884, and the Lady Chapel as a war memorial in 1920–21. It is built in sandstone with a hipped grey slate roof. The church consists of a nave with octagonal ends, north and south transept-like wings, a northeast vestry, a southeast chapel, and a square west tower. The tower has four reducing stages, the bottom stage is in smooth ashlar and contains windows, the next is rusticated with a clock face, the third stage has round-arched bell openings and coupled pilasters, and the top stage has recessed angle columns. On the top is a rotunda of columns with a conical fluted spire. On the south wing is a portico with four attached Ionic columns carrying a dentilled pediment.	I
Lydgate Manor; 53.66014°N 1.55694°W		Late 18th to early 19th century	A stone house, partly rendered, with sill bands and a hipped stone slate roof. There are three storeys and a symmetrical front of three bays. The central doorway has a moulded architrave and a triangular pediment on consoles, and the windows are sashes with architraves.	II
Grove House; 53.65762°N 1.54774°W	—	c. 1810	A stone house with a hipped stone slate roof. There are two storeys, five bays, and a single-storey extension on the left. The central doorway has a moulded surround and a fanlight, and the windows on the front are sashes, most with rusticated lintels. At the rear are casement windows and a tall round-headed stair window.	II
25 New Street, Horbury; 53.66089°N 1.55232°W	—	Early 19th century	A weaving shed later converted into a house, it is in stone and has a fascia with paired gutter brackets, and a stone slate roof. There are two storeys, a symmetrical front of five bays, and nine bays at the rear. In the centre is a doorway with pilaster jambs, flanked by large canted bay windows, and in the upper floor are sash windows. At the rear are two doorways, a tripartite window, and a taking-in door in the upper floor converted into a window.	II
Former lock-up 53.66103°N 1.55607°W		Early 19th century	The former lock-up is in stone with quoins and a stone slate roof. There are two storeys and one bay. In the ground floor is a doorway at the front, and a window with a grill at the rear. External steps lead up to a doorway in the upper floor.	II
Jenkin House; 53.66079°N 1.56506°W	—	Early 19th century	A house later used for other purposes, it is in stone with a stone slate roof. There are three storeys, and a symmetrical front of three bays. In the centre is a doorway with a moulded architrave, and a triangular pediment on console brackets. This is flanked by two-storey bow windows, the windows divided by Tuscan colonnettes. The other windows are sashes, the window above the doorway with a moulded architrave. At the rear is a round-headed stair window.	II
Former school 53.66100°N 1.55634°W		Early 19th century	The building has been used for various purposes, including a school, a parish hall, and a works, is in stone with a stone slate roof, There are three storeys and three bays, with the gable end facing the street. The windows are tripartite casements, or are fixed, and in the gable end is an inscribed plaque.	II
Lock marker stone 53.65061°N 1.53570°W	—	c. 1838	The marker stone is on the south side of the Horbury Cut of the Calder and Hebble Navigation. It consists of a stone post with rounded top inscribed "100 yd".	II
Lock on Horbury Side Cut; 53.65811°N 1.57983°W		c. 1838	The lock is between the Horbury Cut of the Calder and Hebble Navigation and the River Calder. It is in stone, and contains a single pair of wooden lock gates.	II
Christ Church, South Ossett; 53.67044°N 1.57260°W		1851	The church is in stone with a Welsh slate roof, and is in Early English style. It has a cruciform plan, consisting of a nave, a south porch, north and south transepts, a chancel with a northeast organ chamber, and a west tower. The tower has reducing buttresses, a stair tower to the north, a bracketed embattled parapet, and a low pyramidal roof. Most of the windows are lancets, and in the south transept is a wheel window.	II
Main Ranges, St. Peter's Convent; 53.66292°N 1.55724°W		1862–64	The convent was designed by Henry Woodyer, and it was extended in 1869–71 and in 1883. It is built in red brick, with dressings in yellow sandstone, the east range is in stone, and the roofs are in Welsh slate. The building consists of four ranges around a courtyard, with a tower at the internal southwest corner. The north range has a single storey, and the other ranges have two storeys and attics. The windows have pointed arches, the stair windows are mullioned and transomed, and in the roofs are dormers. The tower has a frieze of small slender lancets at high level, and above this, corbels support small corner buttresses. Over the corbel table is a copper splay-footed spire.	II
Chapel, St. Peter's Convent; 53.66288°N 1.55676°W	—	1869–71	The chapel was designed by Henry Woodyer and the south chapel was added in 1898. It is in red brick, with dressings in yellow sandstone, and Welsh slate roofs. The chapel consists of a nave, north and south transepts, a south chapel, and an apsidal east end. Most of the windows are lancets, and in the transepts are wheel windows.	II
Church of St Mary the Virgin, Horbury Junction; 53.65652°N 1.54395°W		1891–93	The church was designed by Bodley and Garner in Decorated style. It is in stone, and consists of a nave, lean-to north and south aisles, a south porch, a north door, and a chancel with a north vestry and a south chapel. At the west end are two buttresses joined at the top by an arch carrying a square bellcote with a pyramidal roof, and there is a simpler bellcote at the east end of the nave. The east window is large, with three lights.	II
Gas Decontamination Centre; 53.66115°N 1.55932°W		1939	The gas decontamination centre is in red brick with sills in blue brick, and a flat asphalted concrete roof on steel L-beams. The building has a single storey and a rectangular plan, about 75 metres (246 ft) long and 7 metres (23 ft) wide. At the south-east corner is a water tank tower with a flat concrete roof and a boiler room beneath. In the west and east fronts are six top-hung windows.	II
