= Graveship =

Estate subdivision in medieval England

Graveship (Old English: grafansċip) was a subdivision of a medieval estate each was under a grave that was selected every year. An example is the manor of Wakefield, which was managed with 12 graveships. The OED defines a graveship as: "In the West Riding of Yorkshire: a district, in some instances a subdivision of a large parish, in others comprising a number of parishes; so called as having formerly been administered by a grave or a body of graves."

== Grave ==
The term has ancient origins, Morehouse in "The History and Topography of the Parish of Kirkburton and of the Graveship of Holme" defines Grave (prepositus in Latin deeds) as probably derived from the Anglo-Saxon Lenere or the German Graf (Middle-German grave) and in that sense means an officer, whose duty it was to collect the lord’s rents and/or execute administrative orders in the graveship. In most of England, the official would have been termed a reeve but in the manor of Wakefield, he was termed a grave. He was selected at the Michaelmas Great Court Leet by four sworn men of the graveship, at which point either the grave or a designated deputy took an oath of service.

== List of Graveships of the Manor of Wakefield ==
- Alverthorpe
- Hipperholme
- Holme (Note: This particular graveship shares a name with other places: Holn/Holne/Holme, the township and village, Holnfrith/Holnfirth/Holmfirth was the forest consisting of seven townships (Upperthong, Austonley, Holme, Cartworth, Hepworth, Wooldale and Fulstone) but were administered as a single township and Holne/Holme was the name of the graveship which administered Holmfirth along with another six: Thurstonland, Shelpley, Shelley, Burton (Kirkburton) Emley and Flockton.)
- Horbury (Note: The Manor of Wakefield was given by the crown to the Earls Warenne in 1106 and was held by them until 1359. Sir Robert de Horbiry and Sir John de Horbiry were stewards to the Earl de Warenne, who granted Sir John the village of Horbury and its lands for life. After the death of Sir John in 1306, it became one of the constituent 'graveships' of the Manor of Wakefield.)
- Ossett
- Rastrick
- Sandal
- Scammonden
- Sowerby
- Stanley
- Thornes
- Wakefield

== List of other Graveships ==
- Howgrave

== See also ==
- Reeve

== Notes, citations, and references ==
=== References ===
- 'graveship' Yorkshire Historical Dictionary. Accessed 12-4-2020.
- Fraser, C M; Emsley, K, eds. (1977). Wakefield Manor Court Rolls. Vol. v.1. Yorkshire Archaeological Society.
- Map of Wakefield Manor in Wakefield Manor Court Rolls, v.1 p. 26
- Walker, J.W. (1966). Wakefield its History and People. Vol. 1, 2 (3rd ed.). S.R. Publishers.
- Barber, Brian. "The Records of the Manor of Wakefield: A UNESCO-Recognised Resource" (PDF). Yorkshire Archaeological & Historical Society.
