= List of Heartbeat episodes =

Heartbeat is a British period drama television series which was first broadcast on ITV between 10 April 1992 and 12 September 2010. Set in the fictional town of Ashfordly and the village of Aidensfield in the North Riding of Yorkshire during the 1960s, the programme is based on the "Constable" series of novels written by ex-policeman Peter N. Walker, under the pseudonym Nicholas Rhea. During the course of the programme, 372 episodes of Heartbeat aired, including nine specials over eighteen series.

== Series overview ==
Series	Episodes	Originally released	
Series	Episodes	First released	Last released
1	10	10 April 1992	12 June 1992
2	10	18 April 1993	20 June 1993
3	10	3 October 1993	5 December 1993
4	16	4 September 1994	25 December 1994
5	15	3 September 1995	10 December 1995
6	17	1 September 1996	25 December 1996
7	24	31 August 1997	22 February 1998
8	24	6 September 1998	28 February 1999
9	24	26 September 1999	5 March 2000
10	24	22 October 2000	8 April 2001
11	24	28 October 2001	14 April 2002
12	25	6 October 2002	18 May 2003
13	25	7 September 2003	6 June 2004
14	26	5 September 2004	5 June 2005
15	26	11 September 2005	2 July 2006
16	24	29 October 2006	5 August 2007
17	24	11 November 2007	28 September 2008
18	24	12 October 2008	12 September 2010

== Episodes ==
=== Series 1 (1992) ===
No. overall	No. in series	Title	Directed by	Written by	Original release date
1	1	"Changing Places"	Roger Cheveley	Johnny Byrne	10 April 1992
PC Nick Rowan and his wife Kate, a doctor, move up from London to begin a new life in Aidensfield. Nick, after meeting his superior, Sergeant Oscar Blaketon, along with PC Phil Bellamy and PC Alf Ventress, deals with matters concerning local troublemaker Claude Greengrass and local boy Alan Maskell. Meanwhile, Kate is disappointed by her meeting with local doctor Alex Ferrenby, but goes to the aid of Alan's mother with a premature birth.
2	2	"Fruits of the Earth"	Tim Dowd	Johnny Byrne	17 April 1992
Nick finds himself investigating cases of drunken hikers and a flasher on the moors, but his most troubling involves locating a missing man whose wife has been having an affair. Kate seeks to help the Maskell family out as Alan's father stubbornly refuses to let his wife use contraception pills for the sake of her health. Blaketon hires a strict cleaner to prepare Ashfordly police station for inspection, much to Phil and Alf's dislike.
3	3	"Rumours"	Ken Horn	David Lane	24 April 1992
Nick and Kate become concerned for the wellbeing of a local shopkeeper when rumours spread of his being improper to a group of young boys he is friends with, leading to his shop being boycotted. Matters become suspicious when a break-in leads to the theft of some masonic items. Greengrass decides to offer his services to two elderly women, but soon regrets it when he starts to think he can make money from the arrangement.
4	4	"Playing with Fire"	Eric Wendell	Rob Gittins	1 May 1992
Nick has his hands full as he deals with a wayward but uncontrollable horse, a spiteful local magistrate, and a serious case of arson at a local farm. Ferrenby is disapproving of Kate's efforts to help Alan's girlfriend, Sandra Murray, with an unwanted pregnancy. Blaketon is suspicious when Greengrass offers information on a gang of salmon poachers operating in the area.
5	5	"Nowt But a Prank"	James Ormerod	Barry Woodward	8 May 1992
Nick finds himself dealing with a tense land dispute between local farmer Dick Radcliffe and his new neighbour Matthew Chapman, as the latter refuses to allow Radcliffe to reach his farm over the only available route. When some local boys conduct a prank on Chapman, it soon puts Nick and Radcliffe in danger, leaving Blaketon and Kate to find a way to defuse the situation.
6	6	"Old, New, Borrowed and Blue"	Tim Dowd	Alan Whiting	15 May 1992
Blaketon is eager to find the burglar behind recent break-ins, who has a habit of tidying up before stealing valuables, though Nick is also concerned a local church organist is using deception to access the valuables of elderly people. Ferrenby begins reconsidering offering Kate a job. Alan's wedding day finally arrives, but the happy occasion is nearly spoiled by troublemakers.
7	7	"Face Value"	Terry Iland	David Lane	22 May 1992
Blaketon has his men prepare for a peaceful demonstration being led by Paul Melthorn, a charismatic politician leading the group. However, Nick faces accusations of assault from Melthorn with one of the demonstrators, that soon places a strain on his relationship with Kate. At the same time, Greengrass becomes involved with two local lads who turn to burglary and get themselves into trouble.
8	8	"Outsiders"	Tim Dowd	Peter Barwood	29 May 1992
Former circus man Joseph Lazlos arrives in Aidensfield with his family to see his birthplace before his eventual death, but their arrival soon brings problems. His son Milos sparks up a friendship with the local vicar's daughter, much to the chagrin of her father and her future fiancée. Nick and Kate find themselves risking their reputations to help Lazlos' family out, especially when the village church is broken into and money is stolen.
9	9	"Primal Instinct"	Ken Horn	Brian Finch	5 June 1992
Retired Scotland Yard detective Andrew Gerrard is found murdered by his wife and mother-in-law, prompting Ashfordly police to assist in the matter, though when Nick becomes involved he soon begins to question the alibis of the two women. Kate feels uneasy when one of the visiting detectives begins flirting with her. Greengrass comes to the aid of Alan, after he inadvertently causes him to handle stolen cars with his new business.
10	10	"Keep On Running"	Gavan Theoditis	Johnny Byrne	12 June 1992
Nick travels to London for an interview, and at the same time goes looking for Alan after he disappears from home, but soon questions moving back to the city as Kate is not adamant on leaving Aidensfield behind. Greengrass faces trouble when a local sheep farmer accuses him of rustling his livestock, yet while he protests his innocence, Blaketon is more than happy to see him suffer despite the accuser's story slowly not tallying up.

=== Series 2 (1993) ===
No. overall	No. in series	Title	Directed by	Written by	Original release date
11	1	"Secrets"	Bob Mahoney	Adele Rose	18 April 1993
Nick finds himself investigating a robbery late at night, in which the victim lost their van, goods, and their own clothes, and quickly suspects the involvement of Lord Ashfordly's erratic son, Robert, whose behaviour does not help their situation. Kate finds herself rushed off her feet as Aidensfield's mothers become heavily worried by a recent outbreak of chickenpox in the area.
12	2	"End of the Line"	Bob Mahoney	David Martin	25 April 1993
An elderly visitor from London, Frank Milner, arrives in Aidensfield with the intention of punishing Nick for his involvement in arresting their granddaughter. Kate finds herself coming to the aid of a young child that is seriously ill, until Milner puts her own life in danger. Greengrass conducts a barn clearance that turns up an old car, but he soon regrets selling it to Nick when he discovers its true value.
13	3	"Manhunt"	Ken Horn	David Lane	2 May 1993
Armed robbers imprison Nick in the cellar of the Aidensfield Arms, alongside Greengrass and the landlord George Ward. The following day, Nick discovers two important leads to the robbery, one of which involved Greengrass's dog Alfred recognising one of the robbers. Both he and Phil soon find themselves on the hunt for a known criminal with a heart condition, until they discover his wife and daughters are intent on misleading them.
14	4	"Bitter Harvest"	Ken Horn	Jane Hollowood	9 May 1993
Local cattle farmer Reg Manston finds his livelihood in ruins when his livestock are found to be infected with foot-and-mouth disease, but Nick and Kate soon discover the infection came from a neighbouring farm, and the link between the two cases soon leads to a tragedy no-one foresees. George is surprised when his niece Gina is sent to him from Liverpool to help him out in the Aidensfield Arms.
15	5	"Over the Hill"	Tim Dowd	Johnny Byrne	16 May 1993
Ken Marston, a black soldier, goes AWOL following an accident involving his bullying sergeant, prompting Ashfordly police to co-operate with military police in tracking him down, though Nick has some concerns regarding the circumstances of the case. Kate deals with a widowed mother, Helen Sanford, who faces losing her son following the loss of her husband, only for the situation to worsen.
16	6	"Bang to Rights"	Tim Dowd	Brian Finch	23 May 1993
Kate prevents Rosie Tiniswood from committing suicide, leading Nick to investigate the woman's claims that her husband was wrongfully convicted for a crime he did not commit, despite being a known criminal. Phil makes plans to marry his new girlfriend but is suddenly assaulted by a stranger for unknown reasons, but soon Gina and Greengrass provide him with clues that lead him to discover his new relationship is seriously flawed.
17	7	"A Talent for Deception"	Terry Marcel	Jonathan Critchely	30 May 1993
Nick investigates a serious hit-and-run accident near Aidensfield, and suspects Kate's former boyfriend, Peter Hughes, of being the driver that caused it, just as his wife is feeling uncomfortable seeing Hughes again. Phil attempts to organise a talent contest for his local football club, unaware someone seeks to sabotage it, while Greengrass tries to capitalise on his good fortune with a pair of outsiders but soon regrets it.
18	8	"Baby Blues"	Catherine Morshead	Veronica Henry	6 June 1993
A group of hippies arrive in the area and soon cause problems for a family-run toy store owned by Marjorie Doubleday, but Nick has to intervene when Doublday's infant child is abducted, and soon connects it with the disappearance of a local woman. Greengrass decides to train up a racehorse, but causes considerable trouble for Blaketon when he trains it within Aidensfield.
19	9	"Wall of Silence"	Terry Marcel	Jane Hollowood	13 June 1993
Nick finds himself dealing with a number of break-ins around Aidensfield, including at Ashfordly Hall, that has resulted in the theft of money, gin, and pheasants. At the same time, Kate has to save Susan Rawlings, the daughter of Lord Ashfordly's former gamekeeper, after she is rushed to hospital following an illegal abortion. Both Nick and Kate soon discover a wall of silence that makes them suspect their cases are connected to each other.
20	10	"Missing"	Terry Marcel	Adele Rose	20 June 1993
A stolen painting turns up in Aidensfield, prompting Nick to investigate where it came from after it transpires it was given to a couple of workers of a travelling fair, who later decided to sell it on. Kate comes to the aid of an elderly woman who is suffering emotional problems that she soon links to the woman's son. Greengrass begins having health issues, and soon finds himself instructed to change his diet on health grounds.

=== Series 3 (1993) ===
No. overall	No. in series	Title	Directed by	Written by	Original release date
21	1	"Speed Kills"	Terry Marcel	David Martin	3 October 1993
Nick finds himself on the hunt for stolen drugs taken during a break-in at the village surgery, which also saw Ferrenby critically injured by the thieves, and gets a lead when a friend of Gina's collapses following a girl's night out. Kate becomes concerned for the wellbeing of a pregnant woman who has suffered miscarriages in the past, and attempts to discover what was behind her recent troubles that could endanger her unborn child.
22	2	"Riders of The Storm"	Tim Dowd	Brian Finch	10 October 1993
Heavy snow derails a passenger train near Aidensfield, leaving several people badly injured, including Ferrenby and Gina's cousin. As a rescue effort is mounted, Nick discovers one of the passengers was Stevie Walsh, a recently released convict who has returned to the area for unknown reasons. At the same time, Kate finds herself assisting Walsh's former wife, as she finds herself going into labour with a child she is having with another man.
23	3	"Dead Ringer"	Tim Dowd	Johnny Byrne	17 October 1993
Bellamy finds himself in trouble when a rental storage linked to his address is found to be in possession of items stolen during a burglary, causing him to be suspended from duty, but Nick believes he is innocent when he learns someone is out to frame him. Greengrass decides to conduct a greyhound racing scam with the unwitting help of a former trainer's grandson and his dog, until Kate warns the trainer of his scheme.
24	4	"Going Home"	Bob Mahoney	Johnny Byrne	24 October 1993
Local landowner Martin Lessor is nearly shot by a German visitor, Victor Kellerman, prompting Nick to investigate what the motive was after the suspect is caught trying to leave the country. Ferrenby dies while on holiday from a brain haemorrhage no one knew about, leaving Kate and the villagers of Aidensfield in deep shock. Greengrass decides to help some Irish gypsies organise a bare-first fight right under Blaketon's watchful gaze. [Final appearance of Dr. Alex Ferrenby.]
25	5	"A Chilly Reception"	Catherine Morshead	Eric Wendell	31 October 1993
Nick finds himself investigating a spate of incidents that seem intent on disrupting the wedding of Susan Siddons, and soon discovers a visitor might be linked to events. Greengrass supplies fish for Siddons' wedding, unaware his supplier gave him stolen goods. Kate receives a visit from her aunt Eileen concerning an inheritance from her uncle, but is reluctant to divulge why she will not accept it.
26	6	"The Frighteners"	Alan Grint	Brian Finch	7 November 1993
Jane Thompson, an elderly woman, becomes a victim of harassment when she receives frightening phone calls after turning down an offer on her property. Nick and Kate become concerned someone wanted her out after various incidents led to her being moved into a nursing home. As they delve into the matter further, they soon learn that Thompson was likely targeted by someone in relation to an upcoming planned development in the area.
27	7	"Father's Day"	Terry Marcel	Brian Finch	14 November 1993
Nick is placed in a delicate situation when Blaketon's estranged son Graham is accused of assaulting a local disco's DJ outside a village hall, though Kate discovers that the young man had good reason when she finds herself dealing with a young woman who visited the disco. Greengrass provides a local pig farmer and her son with a letter revealing they have a fortune to inherit, but they soon face trouble when they try to spend it.
28	8	"Endangered Species"	Tim Dowd	Michael Russell	21 November 1993
Local lad David Stockwell hears noises in the woods one night that soon leads to his mother being the victim of a hit-and-run and eager to have her son stay quiet on what happened; Nick investigates and finds evidence that there is an illegal badger-digging ring operating in the area. Greengrass takes interest in selling shares in a racehorse, only to accidentally short-sell to many of the residents around Aidensfield. [First appearance of David Stockwell.]
29	9	"An American in Aidensfield"	Catherine Morshead	Peter Palliser	28 November 1993
American motorcyclist Charlie Dameron visits Aidensfield and finds himself accused of draft dodging by Korean War veteran Fred Manchester, and Nick investigates the accusation. Kate finds it necessary to convert the village police house into a temporary surgery after Ferrenby's practice is put up for sale. Greengrass tries to cheat a local farmer out of two vintage motorbikes in his possession.
30	10	"Bringing It All Back Home"	Bob Mahoney	Michael Russell	5 December 1993
Nick faces potential changes in his life when a police inspection of the Aidensfield police house by a senior officer, Inspector Crossley, leads to Kate considering a job offer at a surgery in Whitby. Greengrass faces trouble from the Inland Revenue over his previous good fortune. A trip out to Whitby offers a chance for Gina to pursue a singing career and Blaketon an opportunity to bond with his son during his free time.

=== Series 4 (1994) ===
No. overall	No. in series	Title	Directed by	Written by	Original release date
31	1	"Wild Thing"	Ken Horn	Michael Russell	4 September 1994
Inspector Crossley demands Ashfordly police uncover the truth behind a spate of attacks on sheep, but when Greengrass' dog Alfred is suspected of the trouble, Nick is convinced that the evidence against the animal points to another suspect. Kate accepts a posting at the Whitby surgery of Dr. Radcliffe but faces problems with his receptionist. Greengrass decides to sort out his debt with the Inland Revenue in his own unique way.
32	2	"Witch Hunt"	Catherine Morshead	Brian Finch	11 September 1994
Marjorie Salter succumbs to arsenic poisoning alongside her husband Harry when renovating the former home of her late great aunt. Inspector Crossley immediately suspects the couple's housekeeper, Nancy Bellow, of poisoning them, though Nick is uncertain of his theory. When the Salters are poisoned again, Kate soon uncovers the truth, but not before Crossley's actions have severe consequences.
33	3	"Mid Day Sun"	Baz Taylor	Jonathan Critchely	18 September 1994
Local garage owner Jim Swaby is rushed to hospital by Kate when his health worsens, only for it be discovered that he is infected with rabies. As police and local authorities work to prevent a potential outbreak, Nick and Blaketon lead the investigation into finding the dog Swaby got the infection from. Their hunt soon discovers the animal was brought in by a family from abroad, and their only child is searching for it, unaware of the danger they are in.
34	4	"Turn of The Tide"	Tim Dowd	Johnny Byrne	25 September 1994
Nick and Ventress find themselves asked by CID to go undercover as part of an investigation into a possible smuggling operation being run out of Whitby, and soon discover a local shipping company is connected, leading them to coerce the owner to entrap the smugglers. Kate provides assistance to a teenage girl who she fears wants an abortion. Greengrass decides to become a meat trader, though Blaketon is sceptical of his plans.
35	5	"Love Child"	Ken Horn	Brian Finch	2 October 1994
Sandie Sanderson breaks into local council offices in a quest to find the child she gave up for adoption, prompting Nick to track her down when she mistakenly abducts the wrong child from its parents, unaware her own child adopted by them is dead. Greengrass is accused of harming peregrine falcons when he seeks to stop them harming pigeons, until fresh evidence proves a local gamekeeper is to blame.
36	6	"Nice Girls Don't"	Baz Taylor	Jane Hollowood	9 October 1994
Gina spends a night out celebrating with a local rugby team's latest win, but her return home sees her followed by a male driver who forces her off the road and assaults her. However, when it comes to telling the police, she finds doubt being raised on her recollection of events, before she is pressured by local family of the main suspect in the matter to drop the case. Nick decides to investigate further, believing Gina's assault should not be ignored.
37	7	"Trouble in Mind"	Tim Dowd	Johnny Byrne	16 October 1994
Nick and Kate find themselves investigating the strange case of Dennis Parker, a man who has no memory of the past seven years, who has turned up in Aidensfield but is wanted for inquiries to a serious crime they were somehow involved in. Greengrass finds himself bothered by a man obsessed with one of Alfred Hitchcock's films fan, especially as he suggests that they should burn down each other's property for the insurance.
38	8	"Fair Game"	Matthew Evans	Veronica Henry	23 October 1994
Nick investigates the tragic death of local businessman Jack Temple-Richards during a fox hunt, after a postmortem finds he had taken an abnormally high dose of sleeping pills, prompting Nick to question the wife Samantha when he uncovers evidence she was having an affair (see also episode 75). Greengrass gets his hands on some prize-winning fighting cockerels, unaware others seek to acquire them for illegal cockfighting matches.
39	9	"Red Herring"	Ken Horn	Michael Russell	30 October 1994
Russian sailor Vladimir Ivanov goes missing from his trawler in Whitby, only to turn up in Aidensfield in the hope of seeking political asylum. But he soon disappears when his actions attract the attention of British intelligence. Nick and Kate soon discover he lied about possessing sensitive information, when they find him seeking help from a local Russian priest, leading both to concoct a plan to return him to his ship before he is discovered.
40	10	"Arms and The Man"	Tim Dowd	Jonathan Critchely	6 November 1994
Following a shooting accident on the farm of Second World War veteran Ron Cooper, Nick becomes concerned that he may have been holding unlicensed munitions, which are soon justified when Greengrass discovers some local children might have gotten their hands on explosives. Meanwhile, Kate faces difficulties with the couple's marriage due to her work taking her away from home of late.
41	11	"Treading Carefully"	Catherine Morshead	Lizzie Mickery	13 November 1994
Aidensfield suffers from a spate of thefts that see lead being stolen from local rooftops, but while Blaketon thinks Greengrass is involved, Nick is convinced the thefts are being done by a gang of young men that recently arrived in the area. Kate finds her work life and marriage coming under constant strain, but she is soon convinced to patch things up with her husband, especially when she has surprising news they can enjoy.
42	12	"Bad Blood"	Matthew Evans	Steve Trafford	20 November 1994
Nick investigates a break-in at a local farm owned by Arthur Jacobs, who constantly feuds with his older brother Darcy over their late father's will, but Kate suspects there is more to this when Arthur's wife voices her fears regarding Darcy. Gina is delighted when an old boyfriend from Liverpool comes to visit her, much to George's dislike, but it is not long before he begins causing trouble with his inability to be honest.
43	13	"Assault and Battery"	Tim Dowd	Freda Kelsall	27 November 1994
Local poultry farmer Mervyn Sykes is found dead after being killed by his own shotgun, prompting Nick to investigate the circumstances, especially after Sykes had become a victim of a campaign claiming he mistreated chickens on his property. Greengrass decides to make some money by selling surplus eggs as free range, but soon has trouble when his customers come back angry over finding out the poor quality of his products.
44	14	"Lost and Found"	Ken Horn	Johnny Byrnes	11 December 1994
Widower Howard Franklin arrives in Aidensfield to bury his late wife's ashes in her family's plot, but a mix-up with his luggage sees Nick and Kate helping him make peace with his estranged mother-in-law. The annual country fete sees Blaketon seeking to maintain a firm presence, while Greengrass attempts to nobble a rival's dog before a dog racing competition.
45	15	"A Bird in the Hand"	Matthew Evans	Jonathan Critchely	18 December 1994
Nick and Kate both become concerned for the wellbeing of elderly sheep farmer Tom Abbott, after someone lets his sheep out of their pens and infects some unpasteurised milk that leaves a young girl seriously ill, leading the couple to discover Abbott's problems may be linked to troublemakers at home and from a neighbouring farm. Greengrass turns private detective to trace a missing relative, and recruits Gina to help him out.
46	16	"A Winter's Tale"	Tim Dowd	Brian Finch	25 December 1994
Two young children seeking to raise money at Christmas so that their sick brother can receive treatment abroad decide to steal pine trees from the estate of Lady Janet Whitly, borrowing Greengrass' truck in the process. Nick soon finds out what they are doing when the pair are caught by their father, but his concern for the family leads to him trying to convince Whitly into being lenient and providing help to the sick boy's family.

=== Series 5 (1995) ===
No. overall	No. in series	Title	Directed by	Written by	Original release date
47	1	"Wishing Well"	Alister Halum	Johnny Byrne	3 September 1995
Nick and Blaketon attempt to locate a stolen hoard of gold after a piece of it is unknowingly used to vandalise local property, and soon suspect an elderly widow's late husband must have located it when they discover that someone else is searching for the hoard. District nurse Maggie Bolton provides help to Kate with her surgery patients, unaware she is secretly conducting blood tests on herself due to deep concerns on her health. (First appearance of Maggie Bolton)
48	2	"Expectations"	Tim Dowd	Lizzie Mickery	10 September 1995
Nick becomes concerned over the disruptive and unruly behaviour of Joe Norton, the leader of a group of boys, whilst he investigates a spate of clothing thefts around Aidensfield that coincide with the arrival of a gypsy woman. Meanwhile, Kate is taken to hospital when she goes into labour, but the results of her self-administered tests lead to the joyous moment of birth being overshadowed with grim news.
49	3	"Thief in the Night"	Tim Dowd	Jane Hollowood	17 September 1995
Nick spends as much time as possible with Kate, as his dying wife makes plans to help him prepare for a life without her. Maggie becomes deeply worried about how he will cope, especially with him raising the couple's newborn daughter as a single parent. As news reaches close friends and family, Nick struggles to cope with his grief when the inevitable time comes, especially when he discovers an unlikely culprit behind a spate of petrol thefts.(Final appearance of Kate Rowan)
50	4	"Domestic"	Allister Halum	Brian Finch	24 September 1995
Nick struggles to maintain his policing duties while looking after his infant daughter Katie, six weeks after Kate's funeral, especially when a dispute between neighbours gets out of hand, prompting Nick's mother Ruby to visit to offer her help. Greengrass decides to arrange a darts match involving his nephew Norman, in hopes of making money from his exceptional skill in the game, unaware Norman has his own plans.
51	5	"Vacant Possession"	Tom Cotter	John Stevenson	1 October 1995
Brenda Booth is angered when her employer Frank Mellor puts up a cottage for sale that he had promised to her and her boyfriend Eddie King, leading Nick to investigate a spate of incidents that Frank blames on Eddie. Ruby attempts to find romance with Sergeant Blaketon, following the death of Nick's father, but eventually realises it will not work, prompting her to bring in Kate's aunt Eileen to help Nick with raising Katie.
52	6	"We're All Allies Really"	Ngozi Unwurah	Peter Tinniswood	8 October 1995
Nick is concerned when locals resent the arrival of German visitor Dieter Lotschmeyer, especially as his father was a bomber pilot that killed the parents of a local moorland rescue team member, but soon prompts co-operation when Dieter gets into trouble. Greengrass comes to the aid of an elderly man visiting the region with his wife by helping them fulfil a lifelong dream of driving a locomotive, even if it means nearly causing chaos in the process.
53	7	"Sophie's Choice"	David Innes Edwards	Rob Gittins	15 October 1995
Nick and Maggie become concerned for the mental health of the wife of local teacher Barry Jackson following a spate of incidents but are soon shocked when she dies after the couple's house is set on fire. Gina and Eileen become worried about a young girl when their father expresses rude but defensive behaviour around their child. George competes against Greengrass by entering a stray for some pigeon racing.
54	8	"Gone Tomorrow"	Graeme Harper	Freda Kelsall	22 October 1995
Parish councillor Bernard Conway disappears during an ongoing dispute with farmer Ted Halliwell, leading Nick to investigate what happened when he learns what the dispute was about. Eileen offers to help raise money for charity for local woman Hester Jarvis but is surprised when they refuse to call the police when it goes missing. Ventress fears for his future when he thinks he saw a UFO during a stormy night.
55	9	"Toss Up"	David Innes Edward	James Robson	29 October 1995
Nick investigates a spate of burglaries around Aidensfield being committed by someone disguised with a cloth bag over their head, but gets a lead when Maggie is targeted by the culprit. A serious car accident that claims the life of a young girl prompts Blaketon to order an investigation, whereupon Ashfordly police become suspicious that a recent arrival staying with Greengrass is involved with drugs.
56	10	"It's All in the Game"	Tom Cotter	Ron Rose	5 November 1995
Nick is reunited with his old friend Jill Criddle, a police sergeant from London, during his daughter's christening. When divisional CID requests assistance from Ashfordly police in a major investigation concerning crime boss Frank Armstrong, Nick and Jill find themselves working together to seek answers at his recently opened gambling den in Scarborough. They soon learn he plans to fix a race at an annual horse racing event, involving a horse whisperer who Greengrass recently took in, so while Jill puts herself at risk staying close to Armstrong, Nick works to prevent the scheme succeeding.
57	11	"Vigilante"	Graeme Harper	Brian Finch	12 November 1995
Miriam Wakefield is heartbroken when her husband dies from a heart attack after trying to apprehend a robber in their home, and promptly pursues the culprit, local criminal Terry Tinniswood, when his family obstructs her chances for justice. Blaketon is not impressed with the ideas of overzealous special constable Hector Cowley, though he delights when Greengrass is accused by him of sabotaging Cowley's hobby, until Cowley's wife reveals the truth during an annual fete.
58	12	"Unfinished Business"	Tom Cotter	Jane Hollowood	19 November 1995
Greengrass and David unearth an unexploded bomb, following an accident while working on the foundations for a new house for Ventress in Aidensfield. As the village is evacuated, after the army arrives to defuse it, Nick and Blaketon find themselves attempting to locate a missing young boy who disappeared from a local school event, but soon have another problem on their hands when the search turns up a dead man's body in the home of a local station master.
59	13	"Saint Columba's Treasure"	Gerry Mill	Jonathan Critchely	26 November 1995
Blaketon becomes suspicious when Greengrass takes an interest in a rumour concerning a hidden treasure in the area, following the death of a local scholar, but when he pursues after him into some old abbey tunnels, both men are trapped when there is a cave-in that seriously injures Blaketon. Ashfordly police finds themselves dealing with a spate of thefts around Aidensfield, until local garage owner and undertaker Bernie Scripps provides a clue to the thief's identity.(First appearance of Bernie Scripps)
60	14	"Sitting Off the Dock of The Bay"	John Darnell	Rob Gittins	3 December 1995
As his colleagues seek to shut down a pirate radio ship broadcasting in the area, Nick is forced to go undercover as a DJ when Maggie's brother Danny, a DJ aboard the ship, brings evidence that its owner is smuggling LSD into the area. Greengrass decides to make his own whiskey on his property, but George soon suspects what he is doing, providing an opportunity for Blaketon to see him convicted for his illegal still.
61	15	"Blood Sports"	Gerry Mill	Brian Finch	10 December 1995
Charles Carter arrives in the area with his young son Simon, following a bad divorce with his wife Michelle Blanchard, but Maggie becomes concerned for the couple's child when he collapses from polio, and Michelle fears her behaviour with Simon has placed Charles in serious danger. Greengrass tries to make use of local rugby player Ken Fairbrother for his own ends, prompting Blaketon to intervene and advise him against the arrangement. In the course of his enquiries, Nick meets newly arrived local teacher Jo Weston.

=== Series 6 (1996) ===
No. overall	No. in series	Title	Directed by	Written by	Original release date
62	1	"Kids"	Tim Dowd	Brian Finch	1 September 1996
Derek Ramsey escapes police custody, and when his girlfriend, single mother Dorothy McGowan, is attacked in her home, Blaketon suspects Ramsey of the crime, but Nick finds there is more to the matter. Greengrass faces trouble when he is accused of stealing after becoming Aidensfield's new lollipop man. George faces trouble when Lord Ashfordly increases the rent on his pub. Nick develops feelings for Jo following further meetings.
63	2	"Old Colonials"	Ken Horn	Ron Rose	8 September 1996
Nick finds himself investigating livery stable owner Bill Ruane, who has serious financial problems and is struggling to keep control over his business after refusing to sell his property to one of Lord Ashfordly's staff, especially when they come under suspicion for burglary. Greengrass is unhappy to see his nephew Norman again, but reluctantly agrees to do business with his American soldier friend in the sale of items, unaware they are stolen. Jo decides to enter a relationship with Nick after bonding with Katie.
64	3	"Forget Me Not"	James Hazeldine	Jane Hollowood	15 September 1996
Tailor shop employee Alan Davies becomes immensely frightened when he begins receiving disturbing phone calls, photos and messages at his home in Aidensfield, leading Nick to discover that they may have been intended for Davies' new neighbour, Adrian Shaw, in connection to a young girl's death they caused. George decides to begin offering cooked meals at the Aidensfield to deal with the increased rent, with Gina bringing a chef to help, until she causes trouble for them.
65	4	"A Long Shot"	Tim Dowd	David Lane	22 September 1996
Jo becomes concerned that her pupil, Len Schofield, is being abused by his father Harry, especially when Maggie discovers bruises on the boy's body, but the matter turns out to be something else, especially when Len runs away from home. Greengrass decides to borrow one of Lord Ashfordly's horses for his latest moneymaking scheme, but things soon go wrong when he tries to return the animal back to its stables.
66	5	"Something of Value"	Gwennan Sage	Johnny Byrne	29 September 1996
Ashfordly police finds itself investigating the theft of valuable wine and port from a warehouse, but Nick is concerned when Ventress begins acting funny during the investigation. When he confronts his colleague about his behaviour, Nick soon learns Ventress owes a gambling debt to Charlie Wallace, a haulier owner who committed the robbery. Offering to help, Nick and Ventress set up a trap for Wallace, after Greengrass comes across the stolen goods on Lord Ashfordly's estate.
67	6	"Frail Mortality"	Michael Cocker	Keith Temple	6 October 1996
Susan Watkins is put into a coma after being run down in an accident, with Maggie in serious trouble when she is blamed for the accident, prompting Nick to come to her defence when evidence emerges that places suspicion on a father and son who both loved the victim. Greengrass suffers bad luck when he tries to sell a Russian tea urn he recently bought, and offers to help a local woman with their dead cat when he believes Bernie has a talent for taxidermy.
68	7	"Snapped"	Gerry Mill	Peter Gibbs	13 October 1996
Brian Rogers is fired by his boss for the mistaken belief he has caused accidents at a local hotel, creating a situation that Blaketon is forced to try to mediate, until Roger's mother steps in to calm her son down. Aidensfield residents, including Gina and Greengrass, are taken in by a visiting fashion photographer and his models, but Nick suspects there is more to them than meets the eye. Jo begins questioning her relationship to Nick, assuming he does not love her.
69	8	"Catch Us If You Can"	Tim Dowd	Brian Finch	20 October 1996
Nick investigates a spate of attack on jukeboxes that were recently installed in the area, including an attack on Greengrass and his new associate Reggie Rawlins, leading him to suspect a jukebox supplier is using thugs to eliminate any competition the company is facing. Ventress finds himself tasked with arranging a family wedding, but is ashamed when he is conned by a fraudster who took advantage of the situation he was in.
70	9	"Giving the Game Away"	Ken Horn	Guy Meredith	27 October 1996
Nick is surprised when his black friend Errol Jones turns up in Aidensfield and agrees to help the local cricket team, but soon questions are raised about a large quantity of money he possesses, until Nick discovers the real reason for Errol being in the area. Maggie discovers a farmer who was robbed is in possession of banned pesticides, which leads police to discovering the culprit in the theft. Ruby visits the area in hopes of getting Nick and Jo back together at Eileen's request.
71	10	"The Championship"	Gerry Mill	Jane Hollowood	3 November 1996
Following a quoits match against Aidensfield, Hollinsby team captain Donald Smethwick witnesses his wife flirting with one of his players, Jack Abbott, who had recently argued with his own wife Jean. The distraction causes Smethwick to crash his team's coach on the moors. Nick is forced to cut short an evening meal with Jo's parents to join the villagers attending the accident. The incident soon presents a tragic situation that Nick has to handle, after Abbott dies from his injuries.
72	11	"Who Needs Enemies?"	Graham Moore	Brian Finch	10 November 1996
Nick finds himself investigating a serious assault on a young boy on the edge of a golf club, but he soon has suspicions that the culprit is one of the club's members who may be conducting illicit business affairs. Blaketon worries for his job security when a police inspector arrives at Ashfordly police station to make an inspection. Greengrass is forced to go to hospital before he can put down a bet for some associates, and does anything he can to avoid seeing them as a result.
73	12	"Thanks to Alfred"	Graham Wetherell	Rob Gittins	17 November 1996
Nick investigates the suspicious death of Sylvia Philips after her body was found on the moor, but when it turns out she died elsewhere he soon finds himself questioning her estranged husband, her son, and her lover, which soon produces answers that seem to conceal the truth behind the matter. Greengrass offers to help the agent of The Masked Marvel, a wrestler, after Alfred accidentally bites them, but his solution soon causes the wrestler to feel unhappy on his career's future.
74	13	"Obsessions"	Tom Cotter	Peter Gibbs	1 December 1996
Nick comes to the aid of Sandra Croft, a young woman living in Aidensfield who nearly dies in a house fire. She swiftly tries to become part of his life, but his rejection of her affections soon leads her to do everything she can to destroy his life. Greengrass decides to launch a tourism business that soon goes wrong when his first customers, a married couple, suffer problems that nearly wreck their marriage.
75	14	"The Best Laid Plans"	Gwennan Sage	Freda Kelsall	8 December 1996
Susannah Temple-Richards returns to Aidensfield to restart her life after serving time for accidentally killing her husband (see episode 38), but she soon faces trouble when her former cellmate escapes and holds her hostage, around the same time that Nick is investigating a recent post office robbery. Greengrass decides to buy a deceased veteran's bureau in hopes of finding a fortune, which soon does not end well when he believes he has bought a dud.
76	15	"Bygones Be Bygones"	Gerry Mill	Peter Gibbs	15 December 1996
A series of poison pen letters are sent around Aidensfield that put their recipients on edge, leaving Nick and Bellamy to track down where they came from when it becomes clear they were all typewritten and written on one of the typewriters that were recently acquired by Greengrass. Jo becomes concerned when her father Graham Weston is approached by a businessman keen to make him invest in a scheme, and she is soon justified when Nick discovers more about Graham's visitor.
77	16	"Old Friends"	Ken Horn	Ron Rose	22 December 1996
Nick and Phil find themselves assisting in a major CID operation to track down Ronnie Savage, an escaped prisoner, and are assigned to keep surveillance on a known associate who runs a fishery in Whitby, but the situation soon gets worse when Bellamy disappears without warning. Eileen becomes surprised when she is reunited with Antonin Clarion, a French Second World War pilot she had a relationship with, who soon gives her a dilemma that requires her to consult with Maggie.
78	17	"Charity Begins At Home"	Tom Cotter	Jane Hollowood	25 December 1996
Heavy snow causes problems around Aidensfield on Christmas Eve night, causing a bus load of elderly people to get lost, trapping Bellamy and Ventress in their car, and stranding David out on the moors while trying to help out Greengrass. For Nick and Jo, they find themselves dealing with a more serious issue when a plane crash lands near Jo's cottage, and the pair discover its pilot has disappeared, leaving behind a heavily pregnant woman.

=== Series 7 (1997–1998) ===
No. overall	No. in series	Title	Directed by	Written by	Original release date
79	1	"Bad Apple"	Ken Horn	Peter Gibbs	31 August 1997
Nick is not convinced that Keith Megson, a known thief, is involved in a spate of break-ins that occur shortly after he is given bail by Greengrass, despite Blaketon's determination to prove otherwise. Jo announces to her parents that she has become engaged to Nick, but while Graham approves of his daughter's news, her mother Fiona is keen to voice her firm dislike to the arrangement, soon souring the maternal bond between the two women.
80	2	"Pig in the Middle"	Tom Cotter	Brian Finch	7 September 1997
Special constable Hector Cowley suddenly disappears from his home in Aidensfield, prompting Nick and Blaketon to investigate whether it was linked to a dispute he had with a neighbouring pig farmer, until they discover that things are not what they appear to be at home. Greengrass is reunited with Ellen Birley, an old friend, but soon regrets letting her stay with him for a while. Gina finds herself running the Aidensfield Arms on her own when she receives news that George must stay away due to ill health.
81	3	"Small Beer"	Gerry Mill	Bill Lyons	14 September 1997
Nick and Jo become concerned for the wellbeing of young schoolboy Dennis Cross after he disappears when his mother is found dead, but when Greengrass tries to convince him not to run away to London, his claims she has a sister lead Jo and Maggie to discovering hidden secrets about his family. Blaketon suspects an inside job when there is a break-in at a local factory, but the investigation soon causes problems for one of its employees when it digs up their past they had tried to conceal.
82	4	"Closing Ranks"	Tom Cotter	Jane Hollowood	21 September 1997
Bellamy is horrified when his grandmother is the victim of two muggers operating in Ashfordly, but his efforts to seek justice land both him and Nick in trouble, leaving Blaketon and Ventress to resolve the case by seeking help from another mugging victim. Greengrass is engaged by two greedy women who need help finding a fortune their late father hid. Jo struggles to deal with her mother, Fiona, despite learning that Fiona's health has begun to decline.
83	5	"Leaving Home"	Ken Horn	David Lane	28 September 1997
Nick finds himself trying to keep the peace between ex-soldier Clive Thompson, visiting the area after the Second World War, and local farmer Bill Walker, when their children begin seeing each other during Thompson's visit. Greengrass is coerced by an old friend to help ship stolen cigarettes to a fence, and he seeks help from Blaketon. Jo and Graham brace themselves for the worst when Fiona is taken to hospital as her health declines.
84	6	"Fool For Love"	Tim Dowd	James Stevenson	5 October 1997
Local businessman Derek Lightfoot suffers from a string of incidents that he claims are being done by Susan Williamson, a visitor to the area, but Nick soon doubts his accusations when he looks further into the matter and the relationship between the two people. Greengrass offers his services to an Australian couple seeking antiques, but soon regrets it. Jo provides support for Graham, as her father struggles with his grief in the wake of Fiona's death.
85	7	"The Family Way"	Ken Horn	Brian Finch	12 October 1997
Nick attempts to investigate recent arrival Charlie Fenton after he puts a young boy in hospital and prompts their grandfather to seek justice, but soon question why Blaketon wants the matter dropped. Greengrass finds himself visited by his brother Cyril, who is trying to conduct an affair despite being married. Gina takes on help at the Aidensfield Arms in the form of her new boyfriend Steve Adams. Graham spends time with Jo as he continues to struggle with his grief.
86	8	"Friendly Fire"	Tom Cotter	Peter Gibbs	19 October 1997
Lay preacher Richard Ealham is shot in what appears to be an accident, whilst helping local farmers deal with a stray dog, but Nick soon discovers that the incident was deliberate and questions who wanted to kill Ealham. Greengrass gets caught up in a dispute between two brothers who co-own a local bakery, when each wish to have control of their father's secret bun recipe. Gina receives word that her uncle will not be returning, leaving her concerned about the Aidensfield Arms' licence.
87	9	"Sons and Lovers"	Gerry Mill	Susan Wilkins	26 October 1997
Nick finds himself dealing with Lord Ashfordly's sister, Lady Patricia Brewster, when she causes problems when visiting due to her frequent drinking, but then things become more serious when he learns that the woman is dealing with a difficult marriage that is going wrong. Greengrass helps an associate arrange an illegal shooting party on Lord Ashfordly's land, unaware that a visiting vicar seeks to prevent him doing so for reasons that soon confuse him.
88	10	"Playing With Trains"	Gerry Poulson	James Stevenson	2 November 1997
Recently released from prison, Eddie Ainsworth takes advantage of his son Terry's love of trains to plan a job, prompting his wife Molly to inform Ashfordly police that goods made by her employer are to be robbed when she fears Terry is unaware of his father's true nature. Greengrass is doing work in a couple's garden when he comes across some Roman coins, and so goes treasure hunting for more while the pair are away for a few days, but his luck does not hold out well.
89	11	"What the Butler Saw"	Tim Dowd	Garry Lyons	9 November 1997
Nick finds himself involved in the investigation of an attempted murder of a local estate worker, and soon links it to stolen antiques and the disappearance of a butler from Aidensfield that Eileen had suspicions about. Greengrass decides to set up a pool competition, but his plan backfires and cause Gina to break up with her new boyfriend. Maggie is shocked when her husband, Dr. Neil Bolton, moves into the area after taking a post at Ashfordly General Hospital.
90	12	"Affairs of the Heart (Nick Rowan's & Jo Weston's wedding)"	John Anderson	Jane Hollowood	16 November 1997
Nick and Jo's wedding day has finally arrived despite their families not making things easy for the pair, but soon a bigger problem emerges when he comes a woman seeking help for her lover, whom she injured in an argument, only to strand Nick on the moors after taking his car. Greengrass attempts to take advantage of some jellied eels brought by Nick's grandfather, but soon causes a scene. Blaketon discovers his superiors have doubts about his health, and may wish for him to retire.
91	13	"Peace and Quiet"	Tim Dowd	Peter Barwood	23 November 1997
PC Mike Bradley is transferred to Aidensfield to stand in for Nick whilst he is away on his honeymoon. At the same time, armed robbers use Greengrass' latest venture to pull off a wages job, using both him and Gina as hostages. Mike soon finds himself stumbling onto the scene and raises the alarm after someone is shot, but as his colleagues scramble to attend to the scene, the pursuit of the suspects soon put Blaketon's health in serious danger. (First appearance of PC Mike Bradley)
92	14	"Substitute"	Gerry Mill	Ron Rose	30 November 1997
Ventress is shocked when the Deighton family, a group of Irish criminals, return to the area after beating up a colleague of his a few years ago, and becomes determined to find out their plans at great risk to his own life. Greengrass allows a group of girl guides and their leader to camp on his land, but then has to help them when three of the girls get into trouble. Blaketon faces compulsory retirement after his heart attack. Neil confronts Maggie over the ending of their previous relationship after the death of their child.
93	15	"In on the Act"	Gerry Mill	Veronica Henry	7 December 1997
Following Blaketon's retirement, Nick returns from his honeymoon with Jo to find he has been promoted to sergeant. He soon has to investigate a deliberate accident on a young stunt driver that he links to a troubled family. Greengrass is amongst several people in Aidensfield who dislike Trevor Lammas, a local window cleaner, who they decide to make suffer for causing them problems. Eileen finally makes a decision in regard to her old flame, and moves out in preparation for departure to France.
94	16	"The Queen's Message"	John Anderson	Peter Gibbs	21 December 1997
Christmas brings bad luck for Rex Hawkins, a TV rental and repairman, after he is found attacked outside the Aidensfield Arms following choir practice for a concert, but Nick soon discovers he has bigger problems as he owes money to a criminal who sold him several stolen and defective TV sets. Greengrass gets into a spot of bother when he accidentally damages a figurine he sold to Gina, and tries to place the blame on Blaketon's handling of the village post office.
95	17	"Brainstorm"	Garth Tucker	Peter Barwood	4 January 1998
Mike faces trouble when former race driver Russell Palmer dies in custody under his watch after being arrested for a drunken brawl, but Nick is suspicious that Palmer's cousin is trying to conceal information about the man's death as DI Shiner investigates the matter. Greengrass decides to set up a taxi business in Bernie's garage and discovers a new radio system for it can pick up police transmissions, but his efforts to profit from both soon come undone.
96	18	"Bad Penny"	Garth Tucker	Peter Barwood	11 January 1998
Mike faces questions of staying in the area when DI Shiner reveals that an undercover operation he assisted in has fallen apart in court, and that the men he tried bringing down may seek revenge, though he does not expect his old flame from the case turning up out of the blue. Greengrass meets aristocratic traveller Tessa while poaching fish, and soon finds romance when they find they have a lot in common. Nick begins contemplating moving his family abroad.
97	19	"Appearances"	Brian Farnham	Carolyn Sally Jones	18 January 1998
Nick finds himself investigating a spate of burglaries around Aidensfield that target specific items, after John Upton and his family become the latest victims, but the matter is soon complicated when his daughter Ruth is assaulted by the thieves when trying to collect some belongings from home. Greengrass and Bernie meet with an artist who works on modern art, and soon both are inspired to make up their own creations to impress a visiting expert.
98	20	"Local Knowledge"	Gerry Mill	Brian Finch	25 January 1998
As Nick prepares to move to Canada with Jo and Katie, he finds himself dealing with one final investigation when Blaketon spots a former criminal he arrested appear in Aidensfield, shortly before his post office is robbed by a young couple. Greengrass and local farmer Nathaniel Clegghorn attempt to prove their homes are haunted to attract visitors, and soon begin sabotaging each other. Neil decides to take over the village surgery, though his plans are an unwelcome surprise for Maggie. [Final appearance of Sgt Nick Rowan]
99	21	"The Enemy Within"	Garth Tucker	Susan Wilkins	1 February 1998
Blaketon's former army sergeant, Jim Ryan, turns up in Aidensfield following his wife's death, but Neil soon fears he has developed mental problems when his behaviour changes, leading Blaketon to fear for Mike's safety after he tries stop Ryan causing trouble. Greengrass finds himself conned into buying stolen sheep from Charlie Blunkett, and soon seeks revenge when they refuse to refund his money by exposing him for sheep rustling.
100	22	"Unconsidered Trifles"	Gerry Mill	Jonathan Critchley	8 February 1998
Blaketon finds himself in trouble when his car is involved in a hit-and-run after being stolen on the same night, but refuses to explain where he was at the time of the incident, prompting Ventress to investigate after Mike finds drugs in the vehicle that were left behind by the culprits. Greengrass decides to make some money by having Bernie reassemble some old motorcycles from a widow's barn, but his plans come apart when neither live up to expectations.
101	23	"Heroes and Villains"	Brian Farnham	Peter Gibbs	15 February 1998
Trevor and Stuart Chivers break into the home of Gerard Sefton, an elderly First World War hero, after he is taken to hospital following an accident, but while Trevor is more interested in making money for new things, Stuart takes a shine to Sefton's life, just as Mike begins investigating their recent behaviour. Maggie reconciles with Neil following a home birth, after discovering that she still retains feelings for her husband.
102	24	"Love Me Do"	Sue Dunderdale	Jane Hollowood	22 February 1998
Mike is handling discos for teenagers around Aidensfield, but the following morning he is surprised when Maureen Dodds, a young girl, claims she is being stalked. As Ashfordly police find themselves being given a shake up by new police sergeant Raymond Craddock, they soon find themselves on the hunt for Maureen when she disappears during the night. The hunt for her soon leads to secrets being exposed, when it becomes clear who her stalker truly was. [First appearance of Sgt Raymond Craddock]

=== Arrivals ===
- PC Mike Bradley – ("Peace and Quiet", Episode 13)
- Sgt Raymond Craddock – ("Love Me Do", Episode 24)

=== Departures ===
- Sgt Nick Rowan – Moves to Canada to join the Royal Canadian Mounted Police after his secondment to Ashfordly Police ends. ("Local Knowledge", Episode 20)

=== Series 8 (1998–1999) ===
No. overall	No. in series	Title	Directed by	Written by	Original release date	UK viewers (millions)
103	1	"Snake in the Grass"	Gerry Mill	Jane Hollowood	6 September 1998	11.68
Mike finds himself working as a mediator to keep the peace between a farming couple and their new neighbours, but the matter is soon complicated when both sides suddenly come down with food poisoning, prompting both him and Neil to investigate what caused it. Gina returns to Aidensfield following her uncle's funeral and is soon surprised when her aunt Mary Ward arrives to help her out. Greengrass attempts to recover a debt, but winds up being stuck with a python by mistake.
104	2	"Fall Out"	Gerry Poulson	Brian Finch	13 September 1998	11.24
A researcher from Leeds has his car stolen when he stops in Aidensfield, and soon reveals he was transporting a radioactive isotope in the boot, prompting Craddock to launch a major search for it when it goes missing after the car is later recovered. Greengrass is unhappy to see his brother Cyril back in the area, but soon takes an interest in a greyhound that he offers him, unaware that Cyril is using him as part of a fraudulent scheme.
105	3	"For Better or Worse"	Brian Farnham	Peter Gibbs	20 September 1998	12.41
Mike finds himself investigating an accident involving a young driver and soon suspects he was sold an unsafe vehicle by local car salesman Ken Marsden, prompting him to convince his wife Ann to help when he discovers Marsden is being unfaithful to her. Greengrass decides to offer Bernie and Mary some racing pigeons to use, but they soon regret their purchase when the birds prove anything but good. Maggie and Neil decide to renew their commitments to each other as their marriage recovers.
106	4	"Past Crimes"	Brian Farnham	James Stevenson	27 September 1998	13.52
Mike and Craddock find themselves investigating why bank employee Tim McDonald is being tormented by his former friend Carl Southall, who recently arrived in the area, until a robbery at McDonald's bank slowly exposes hidden truths. Greengrass decides to join the local golf club when he learns its members are set to receive a windfall from developers, by doing anything possible for membership. Bellamy moves into the Aidensfield police house after living with his grandmother for long enough.
107	5	"Spellbound"	John Reardon	Phil Ford	4 October 1998	14.36
After a tomb is broken into at a church graveyard, Mike and Craddock find themselves investigating rumours of witchcraft and curses, and are soon drawn to the Harper family who are facing serious difficulties, especially when the head of the family, Derek Harper, is involved in a car accident after finding a skull. Greengrass attempts to sell local mud as a beauty product after meeting a woman who enjoys mud treatments, but his new venture soon causes trouble for him.
108	6	"Baby Love"	Gerry Mill	Anthony Read	11 October 1998	14.33
Allan and Hazel Mansfield struggle with looking after their infant son Peter following his adoption, but when the child is abducted, Mike and Craddock find themselves seeking leads on who took the baby, especially when Maggie reveals that Peter has troubling breathing problems. Greengrass is hired to concrete a drive and thus employs a young man visiting the area to help with the job, unaware that his new associate has recently escaped from borstal.
109	7	"Give a Dog a Bad Name"	Brian Farnham	Peter Gibbs	18 October 1998	14.28
Following the death of his wife, local vet Josh Roberts endangers his career by heavily drinking, which Craddock disapproves of, prompting Ventress to step in and try to find a solution when Roberts is urgently needed by Lord Ashfordly. Greengrass has David runs a bric-a-brac stall near his home, but Neil soon discovers that some of his customers have gotten more than they bargained for. Bellamy seeks to catch the attention of Sue Driscoll, Ashfordly police's new civilian assistant.
110	8	"Hello, Goodbye"	Garth Tucker	Michael Jenner	25 October 1998	14.22
Mike finds himself investigating an attack on Indian doctor Deepak Rall, who arrived in the area with his family in hopes of seeking work, and soon learns that Rall may have left himself at the mercy of some dangerous people. Neil and Maggie become concerned for the pregnant Nora Leddon when she falls ill, and soon discover that her condition may be linked to her husband's recent activity on their farm. Greengrass decides to run a mobile shop, believing he will make a fortune with his latest scheme.
111	9	"Pat-A-Cake"	John Reardon	Helen Slavin	1 November 1998	14.64
Mel Drinkwater disappears one night when she leaves with the intention of eloping with her boyfriend Terry Matthews, and all the signs point to her being kidnapped, leading Mike to question who the kidnapper is when an early lead soon proves to be a dead end. Craddock orders an investigation into a break-in at the Aidensfield surgery, after Neil discovers drugs were stolen. Greengrass offers to help David look after a local woman's cat, but gets more than he bargains for.
112	10	"Easy Rider"	Garth Tucker	Peter Barwood	8 November 1998	14.80
Italian cyclist Paolo Ermini is thoroughly disliked by members of his cycling club, but when his body is found on the moors after he suffered a heart attack, Craddock and Mike launch an investigation when it transpires he died somewhere else. Ventress decides to deal with rumours of UFO sightings after locals saw a craft flying silently overhead in the area. Greengrass accidentally buys Chinese communist figurines, and is soon trying to find a way he can profit from his mistake.
113	11	"Hot Rocks"	Gerry Mill	Susan Wilkins	15 November 1998	14.13
Patricia Brewster reunites with Lord Ashfordly to inform him that she has become engaged to her new lover Ronnie Harper, but the pair soon have doubts about the man as Mike investigates whether he is behind a string of burglaries around Aidensfield that coincide with Harper's arrival. Bellamy is forced to move out of the village police house when Craddock discovers him doing so against police regulations, though is more shocked to learn that Sue is planning to take a new job.
114	12	"Shadows and Substances"	Terence Daw	Brian Finch	22 November 1998	14.61
Neil discovers that a young boy, who had run away, had become seriously ill from drinking from stream contaminated by industrial waste, leading Mike to become suspicious of the new owner of a disused factory site, who is facing protests led by Bellamy's gran against recent lorry activity in her area. Greengrass attempts to cash in on fears of nuclear annihilation by Aidensfield's villager, but Blaketon is not too happy about his planned shelter.
115	13	"Forbidden Fruit"	Gerry Poulson	Neil McKay	29 November 1998	14.40
Mike takes pity on Rachel Palmer after her sister Marianne Fuller is fatally wounded in her home, but soon regrets being romantically involved with her, unaware that Craddock and DI Shiner have serious doubts about her when Fuller's husband David conveys concerns regarding his sister-in-law. Mary makes plans to hold a surprise birthday party at the Aidensfield Arms for her niece with a French theme, especially when Gina has dreams to see Paris.
116	14	"Where There's a Will"	Gerry Poulson	Peter Gibbs	6 December 1998	14.35
Peggy Tatton refuses to vacate her brother's farm after he dies in a car accident with his wife, as she despises his stepson John Fraser, prompting Mike to work alongside her solicitor, Jackie Lambert, to find a solution when her actions soon expose flaws in Fraser's claim. Bellamy decides reluctantly to let Greengrass find him a new flat, but the offered property he gets soon gives him headaches when he learns its previous tenant is being sought out by debt collectors.
117	15	"Taking Sides"	Michael Jenner	Garth Tucker	13 December 1998	14.86
Neil finds himself accused of indecent conduct by Elaine Aubrey, a recent patient of his, leaving Maggie worried about her marriage as Mike investigates the matter. Greengrass offers to help organise a Civil War battle re-enactment, but David's efforts to help him find volunteers soon causes problems. Craddock assigns his officers to find a troublemaker who messes with local signs and then vandalises police vehicles that attend to the incidents.
118	16	"Echoes of the Past"	Brian Farnham	Neil McKay	24 December 1998	10.80
Jane Hayes becomes worried for her unborn baby's safety at Christmas when she fears her manor house is haunted following a series of events, prompting Mike and Maggie to investigate the situation in order to determine if her concerns are genuine. Greengrass offers to help find a trophy for an upcoming dance competition arranged by Craddock's wife Penny, only for David to spoil things. Mike and Jackie slowly develop feelings for each other due to their recent work.
119	17	"Twist of Fate"	Paul Walker	Eric Wendell	10 January 1999	15.74
Maggie finds herself accused of medical negligence by the relatives of the elderly Mildred Crosby, who died following breathing difficulties and left her money and a valuable painting, leading to Mike to help prove her innocence in the matter. Ventress and Bellamy find themselves solving separate matters concerning recent burglaries and a horse that keeps disappearing from its owners. Greengrass offers shelter to an Irish traveller, who he soon finds can predict horse race results in his sleep.
120	18	"The Angry Brigade"	Gerry Poulson	Peter Gibbs	17 January 1999	16.48
Lord Ashfordly faces protests from villagers in Aidensfield over his decision to close off a footpath on his land, but Mike has suspicions that the protest's organisers may be linked to a recent arrival who served time in prison for a robbery, of which the stolen money they took has yet to be found. Greengrass decides to become a chimney sweep after discovering it has a lucrative side business attached to it, but he soon makes a mess of things.
121	19	"Fire and Ashes"	Gerry Mill	Rob Heyland	24 January 1999	15.54
Maggie takes a short vacation with Gina to contemplate becoming a parent after discovering she is pregnant. In her absence, Mike finds himself investigating a spate of fires that break out around Aidensfield. When another one breaks out at the home of a local family, Neil dies when he rushes in believing an infant is still trapped inside. As the villagers reel from the shock of his death, Mike soon discovers the truth about the latest blaze when he learns some interesting information from Greengrass.
122	20	"All in the Mind"	Brian Farnham	Johnny Byrne	31 January 1999	16.02
Mike is not willing to listen to the suspicions of an eccentric woman in Aidensfield, until her claims prove true when he discovers that a father is keeping his pregnant daughter prisoner. Ventress finds himself accused of police hostility from victims of incidents in the area, and suspects he is being framed. Greengrass is coerced into helping an old associate with a ferret race, but Blaketon soon attempts to thwart his plans. Maggie struggles to cope with Neil's death while working.
123	21	"Friends Like You"	Frank M. Smith	Brian Finch	7 February 1999	16.34
Gina attempts to rekindle her singing career at a local nightclub in Whitby with the help of a new manager, but soon needs help from Mike and Jackie when she comes under suspicions of using drugs, though the pair soon discover themselves uncovering a CID operation in the process involving the club. Greengrass reluctantly calls for Blaketon's help when he learns that David was conned into buying worthless second-hand clothing. Ventress gets into trouble after falling asleep during a surveillance job.
124	22	"Old Ties"	Gerry Poulson	Chris Thompson	14 February 1999	12.32
The male co-owners of a new restaurant in Ashfordly find their new business targeted with sabotage that causes them grief, but when Mike investigates he soon discovers a connection between the men and the recent arrival of Gina's friend to the area. Greengrass decides to go searching for a fortune in Anglo-Saxon relics from a local man's land, but soon worries that he has uncovered a murder. Maggie makes a decision regarding the future for her unborn child.
125	23	"David Stockwell's Ghost"	John Reardon	Jane Hollowood	21 February 1999	16.53
Wealthy couple Diane and Cecil Palmer return from Africa with their son Peter and attempt to settle down in Aidensfield. However, things soon become problematic, as Peter struggles with his new life, while his parents face embarrassment hosting a dinner party, placing strain on their marriage. When Diane goes missing after heading out for a drink following a row with Cecil, Ventress soon deduces what happens when he and Mike learn that Peter has also disappeared.
126	24	"Testament"	Gerry Mill	Susan Wilkins	28 February 1999	17.01
Jackie's uncle Henry Tomkinson, her boss at her solicitor's firm, becomes the suspect in a hit-and-run accident in Aidensfield involving a young boy. The case puts incredible strain on Mike's relationship with Jackie as she defends Tomkinson in court, though his niece soon begins to doubt her uncle's innocence. Greengrass is commissioned to help with sorting out land acquired by the church for a new graveyard, but his efforts to do so leave the end results less than desirable.

=== Series 9 (1999–2000) ===
No. overall	No. in series	Title	Directed by	Written by	Original release date	UK viewers (millions)
127	1	"Manoeuvres in the Dark"	Gerry Mill	Peter Gibbs	26 September 1999	12.87
Ashfordly police find themselves on a manhunt for Terry Noble, an army friend of Gina who is wanted for murder, but soon Bellamy finds himself in trouble when he is taken hostage by Noble alongside retired colonel Hal Clifford, who was recently banned from driving at night after Mike had to investigate an accident he caused. Greengrass attempts to organise a dinner party, which goes disastrously wrong. Oscar contemplates what to do with a recent inheritance he received and makes a surprise decision.
128	2	"Tricks of the Trade"	Gerry Poulson	Johnny Byrne	3 October 1999	12.95
Greengrass is appalled when the home of an old friend who recently died is broken into and burgled and vandalised, but when the police pursue an associate of his for the crime, he decides to change the habits of a lifetime and help them to track down the real culprits. Maggie decides not to return to work following the birth of her son, but a flu epidemic in and around Aidensfield prompts her to change her decision. Mary and Gina decide to fight back against Blaketon as the Aidensfield Arms' new owner when he criticises the way they deal with customers.
129	3	"Intuition"	Frank W. Smith	Eric Deacon	10 October 1999	13.22
Mike finds himself investigating the suspicious death of Eileen Bayne, who was found within a locked room in her home after her sister suspected something was wrong, and soon has suspicions concerning her husband Tommy when their private life comes under scrutiny. Mary receives an offer from an old friend, prompting her to determine if Blaketon will be perfect for looking after Gina and the Aidensfield Arms. Greengrass attempts to con people into letting him clean their guttering but is soon found out.
130	4	"Puppet on a String"	Roger Bamford	Colin Shinder	17 October 1999	13.29
Maggie and Mike become concerned about the recent behaviour of Sandra Lowson after she is caught stealing, but soon suspect she is trying to raise money for an illegal abortion, unaware she is helping a friend acquire one. Ventress becomes acting sergeant while Craddock is away and conducts an investigation against Sandra's father Tom, a haulier business owner, who he suspects is conducting black market business. Greengrass attempts to raise money to help a dying friend fulfil one final wish.
131	5	"Honor Among Thieves"	John Reardon	Peter Gibbs	24 October 1999	13.77
Mike finds himself facing embarrassment when he comes to the aid of Honor Gale, a visiting writer, whilst keeping watch on a borstal group performing community service in the area, and thus decides to ignore her, until it becomes clear she genuinely needs help. Greengrass offers to help a local candidate, Tom Drabble, win a council election in order to gain planning permission for a new scheme, but faces problems from Blaketon, who is Drabble's opponent in the election.
132	6	"Shotgun Wedding (Mike Bradley's & Jackie Lambert's wedding)"	Frank W. Smith	Peter Barwood	31 October 1999	13.71
Mike and Jackie make plans for a secret wedding ceremony, though while their friends soon find out and make plans to make it an enjoyable occasion, an armed robbery overshadows the event and soon threatens proceedings when Mike is taken hostage by one of the robbers who was injured in the crime. Greengrass is surprised when David reveals a woman is looking for him, only to learn it is his sister Bella Greengrass, whom he had not seen for 22 years.
133	7	"Always a Copper"	Paul Walker	Michael Jenner	7 November 1999	14.59
Blaketon forms a committee to help tackle crime following a spate of break-ins around Aidensfield, much to Craddock's disapproval, and soon things get out of hand that prompt Mike to intervene. Ventress investigates a robbery at a brewery, and soon discovers all is not what it seems. Greengrass entertains Norwegian history students with tours of the area, until David ruins his plans. Gina takes an interest in Andy Ryan, an offshore worker visiting the area.
134	8	"Negative Vibes"	Roger Bamford	John Flangan and Andy McCulloch	14 November 1999	13.22
Mike becomes suspicious when Jackie begins acting strangely and offers assistance to disreputable photographer Sean Banks, and soon confronts her over some provocative photos in her possession until she confesses she is caught up in a complicated situation involving her sister Elizabeth. Greengrass is saddened when his old friend Silas dies from a heart attack and does what he can to help his widow, even if it means arranging a funeral for him despite Silas' body being donated to medical science.
135	9	"Kindness of Strangers"	Gerry Poulson	James Stevenson	21 November 1999	14.30
Mike finds himself investigating the disappearance of a silver bowl from Ernest Dewhurst, especially when he was found unconscious and his home ransacked the following day, and questions the suspicion harboured by Dewhurst's family against a young couple staying on the man's land. Greengrass offers to help organise Aidensfield's annual car rally, while secretly helping a competitor cheat, but his plans come undone. Gina becomes closer to Andy in their relationship.
136	10	"Hollywood or Bust"	Frank W. Smith	Brian Finch	28 November 1999	13.91
Lord Ashfordly and Craddock become starstruck when film director Denzil Arcourt and his team arrive in the area, intending to film scenes at Ashfordly Hall, but Mike soon becomes suspicious of him when he displays odd behaviour after having his photo taken by Gina, shortly before her camera is stolen. David decides to buy chickens from local farmer Nathaniel Clegghorn in the hopes of selling their eggs, but Greengrass soon discovers he was conned and attempts to get even with Clegghorn.
137	11	"Flesh and Blood"	Paul Walker	Gillian Richmond	5 December 1999	14.23
Mike and Phil investigate the remains of a baby's skeleton found in the attic of local butcher Don Lomax after his family found them following his wife's funeral, and question whether it may be linked to the arrival of Lomax's eldest daughter Vera, who had been in a mental institution for several years. Phil's enquiries into the matter complicate his budding romance with Vera's sister. Greengrass attempts to turn wild rabbits into a fictional rare breed to sell at pet stores, until his scheme is discovered by a careful shopkeeper.
138	12	"No Surrender"	Gerry Poulson	Neil McKay	12 December 1999	13.37
Farmer Malcolm Colbourne suffers problems at his farm, including the destruction of a new tractor he bought from dealer John Bennett, leading Mike to investigate and discovering the truth about Colbourne's past during the Second World War and the difficulty he faced in the years afterwards. Greengrass and David become involved in helping a local woman move furniture out of her old home, unaware it actually belongs to her ex-husband who she is in dispute with.
139	13	"Stag at Bay"	Roger Bamford	Susan Wilkins	19 December 1999	14.66
Christmas sees Mike assisting in the investigation into the slaughter of game animals on Lord Ashfordly's land. At the same time, Katie Kendall is struggling with her parents, as Jackie helps out her mother Julia with divorce proceedings against her brutish husband Frank. While Katie befriends David who convinces her to sing at an upcoming concert, Mike and Jackie discover that their separate cases are soon linked and that Lord Ashfordly is in serious danger of being killed.
140	14	"Full Circle"	Diana Patrick	Jonny Bryne	26 December 1999	11.01
Mike comes to the aid of terminally ill Stella Redford, and Billy Trotter, after both are victims of the same thieves operating in the area, while Jackie and Maggie help the couple to reunite with the child they were forced to give up for adoption twenty years previously. Greengrass helps an old friend to conduct an illegal lurcher competition by misleading Craddock and Blaketon, but faces problems when the Inland Revenue looks into his affairs.
141	15	"The Seven Year Itch"	Paul Walker	Peter Gibbs	2 January 2000	13.51
Blaketon is shocked when ex-convict Ray Nixon returns to Aidensfield, having spent seven years in prison, shortly before bizarre events soon happen around the Aidensfield Arms; but, with Craddock absent from police work for two weeks, his stand-in Sgt. Jennifer Nokes is convinced there is nothing wrong. Mike soon begins to suspect that Blaketon is being targeted for revenge. Greengrass agrees to help local man Anthony Mottram by buying some of his father's maps, something he must later rectify when his mother reveals that they were not to be sold behind her back. [First appearance of Sgt Jennifer Nokes]
142	16	"Weight of Evidence"	Gerry Poulson	Peter Barwood	9 January 2000	13.11
Sian Horrocks is raped after running out of petrol late at night in an isolated area, and she accuses "party boy" Ben Ealham, the son of a prosperous local businessman; but Nokes makes a mess of the investigation, causing problems for Mike and Jackie when she acts for Ealham. Greengrass purchases a sheep which he quickly learns has the potential to win at sheep racing events, but future plans for the animal come undone.
143	17	"For Art's Sake"	Roger Bamford	Andrew McCulloch	16 January 2000	14.76
Artist Joe Vaughan moves to Aidensfield from Liverpool to find peace to continue his work, only to nearly be killed when someone sets his home on fire, leading Craddock and Mike to investigate who sought to gain from such action. Greengrass attempts to con the local council out of grant money for running a hostelry, only to find himself facing problems when someone cons him out of the money. Gina is shocked when Blaketon discovers secrets Andy had been keeping from her.
144	18	"A Shot in the Dark"	Gerry Mill	Peter Gibbs	23 January 2000	15.16
Local troublemaker Gary Tyler, who currently has a suspended sentence, is shot by Lord Ashfordly's estate manager after trespassing on his land, forcing Mike to investigate what Tyler was doing there and discovering another person is involved. Greengrass offers to help a local reporter out when they run out of petrol and gets the chance to write their own weekly column in the local newspaper, but his plans to voice his own opinions on people do not work out well.
145	19	"The Good Doctor"	Paul Walker	Jane Hollowood	30 January 2000	14.78
Maggie is delighted to work alongside Aidensfield's new locum Dr. Ian Peters, but soon has concerns about his methods, something Mike agrees with when a friend of Jackie's is involved in a hit-and-run accident and Peters fails to realise she needed urgent treatment. Greengrass tries to profit from some worn out bikes from the Ashfordly Estate, though his scheme soon backfires. Andy attempts to reconcile with Gina, despite the lies he has told.
146	20	"Against the Odds"	Gerry Poulson	Johnny Byrne	6 February 2000	15.16
Peggy Turner and her daughter Lottie are shocked when they find out that their recently deceased employer, Charlie Weller, made them the sole beneficiary of his will, much to anger of his nephew Martin. Both soon find themselves facing attempts on the life of a thoroughbred racehorse they plan to enter into an upcoming race, but while Greengrass suspects a rival trainer is the culprit, Mike is not convinced, especially when Jackie and Blaketon provide clues behind who is seeking to ruin the lives of the Turners.
147	21	"Desperate Measures"	Roger Bamford	Neil McKay	13 February 2000	13.77
Roy Brooks is given a suspended sentence after being found guilty of horse theft, in order to let him work to keep his family together, but when a racehorse of Lord Ashfordly's is stolen, Mike investigates whether Brooks was involved despite the evidence against him. Greengrass learns that Bernie used to work as a psychic, and persuades him to use his skills to help out a widow, with unintended consequences. Phil agrees to babysit Maggie's son, which soon leaves him in a panic when the infant goes missing after he fell asleep.
148	22	"With This Ring"	Paul Walker	Gillian Richmond	20 February 2000	11.69
Frank McCready, Lord Asfordly's gamekeeper, is heavily in debt due to his gambling and thus steals the estate workers' payroll to cover his losses, though his actions soon have consequences when Mike becomes involved in investigating the crime and learns how much McCready's actions will cost him. Greengrass comes across a broken down lorry full of coal, and commandeers the cargo per his interpretation of maritime law, which soon gets him into trouble.
149	23	"Wise Guys"	Roger Bamford	Susan Wilkins	27 February 2000	13.51
Maria Mazzetti becomes concerned when someone targets her family's stock of mobile fish and chips vans following the funeral of her husband, prompting Ashfordly police to investigate the matter. Greengrass tries to enter the fish and chips business at Bernie's suggestion, but faces problems doing so. Ventress takes pity on a widow who repeatedly calls about being robbed, but Blaketon is suspicious about her behaviour.
150	24	"The Son-In-Law"	Gerry Mill	Peter Barwood	5 March 2000	14.52
Ashfordly police investigate when a stolen car, whose owners had recently returned from Amsterdam, is found dumped in a river, and soon discover there is more to the matter than first appears. Greengrass agrees to help a visiting singer with growing orchids, unaware of the trouble it will cause him. Jackie is visited by her parents, who disapprove of her marriage to Mike and attempt to persuade her to move to South Africa.

=== Arrivals ===
- Sgt Jennifer Nokes – ("The Seven Year Itch", Episode 15)

=== Series 10 (2000–2001) ===
No. overall	No. in series	Title	Directed by	Written by	Original release date	UK viewers (millions)
151	1	"Chalk and Cheese"	Paul Walker	Peter Gibbs	22 October 2000	12.24
New resident Celia Hanson has trouble with her car and her neighbour. Greengrass tries the rubbish disposal business, but is nearly killed.
152	2	"Smile for the Camera"	Gerry Mill	Jane Holllowood	29 October 2000	14.22
Grieving his father's death, Anthony Smythe is comforted by Jackie but then Jackie and Mike receive suspicious calls and are visited by a prowler with a camera. The Smythe family engage Bernie and Greengrass for the funeral.
153	3	"Dog Collar"	Noreen Kershaw	Neil McKay	5 November 2000	13.68
Greengrass is hired to enter a poodle in a dog show, but it escapes from David so Greengrass enters Alfred in its place. Items disappear from several churches, and Ventress is knocked out while running a church errand. The reverend and his wife disapprove of their daughter's love for the handyman.
154	4	"Gabriel's Last Stand"	Gerry Poulson	Gil Braley	12 November 2000	13.17
A retiring MP, Gabriel Firth, upsets the village by banning the annual bonfire which is traditionally held on part of his estate and firing his employee who remonstrates with him. Firth is then discomfited by the arrival of a new neighbour, who is his former mistress. His house and car are subsequently vandalised, and then his car brakes are sabotaged, causing him to crash. Greengrass tries selling fireworks. Craddock gives Bellamy extra duty.
155	5	"War Stories"	Diana Peacock	Peter Barwood	19 November 2000	14.94
With Craddock absent from police work all week, A veterans' reunion draws noise complaints, and to everyone's surprise Ventress was a commando in their unit during the war. Greengrass organises their shooting party on the Ashfordly estate, but they find a man shot dead. Bradley had earlier found evidence suggesting the man was involved in fraud, but finds it suspicious. Greengrass's views help Maggie decide how to handle the conflicting wishes of Graham Rysinski and his dying mother. Accused of colluding with Gina, Bellamy is taught the meaning of the word by her.
156	6	"The Fool on the Hill"	Paul Walker	Helen Blizard	26 November 2000	13.86
Sgt Craddock's mother Enid visits for his birthday. She witnesses an assault but he is reluctant to take the report due to her making up stories, though the victim later collapses and is hospitalised. Greengrass places a bet for Enid which wins, but he loses the betting slip and spends the night in the cells with David trying to find it.
157	7	"The Traveller"	Geoff Wonfor	John Milne	3 December 2000	13.62
After a failed robbery, one bumbling robber shoots the other in the foot then hitches a ride with Johnny "The Traveller" Lee. He is soon apprehended by police, and Johnny is unamused when the other robber breaks into the Aidensfield Arms. Claude Greengrass helps organise an illegal trap racing meeting in the streets of Aidensfield.
158	8	"Child's Play"	Steve Goldie	Michael Hall	10 December 2000	13.80
With Craddock absent from police work all week, Activity is reported at an unoccupied house and the police find nothing, though Maggie later discovers a young boy intruding. Mike finds a jacket from a boarding school, and a housemaster is hunting the child. Bernie meets an old friend who claims to run tours to meet celebrities. Bellamy's former flame, Sue Driscoll, arrives, which makes Gina show signs of jealousy. A romance begins between Maggie and Graham Rysinski.
159	9	"Fallen Heroes"	Paul Walker	Johnny Byrne	17 December 2000	12.04
Danny Reese is released from hospital following a car accident, and a suitcase of money is missing from his possessions at the police station. It seems someone is playing Robin Hood as anonymous envelopes appear with money and detailed notes for its use: to pay fines, for restitution to avoid jail, or to visit a war grave. Blaketon becomes suspicious about the money when he realises Danny works at a casino, and David is led into a trap. Bellamy faces a different trap while romancing Gina.
160	10	"Cold Turkey"	Noreen Kershaw	Peter Gibbs	24 December 2000	11.16
New bank manager Gordon Stringer is unpopular for cutting employee benefits and using harsh methods to recover overdue loans. He also refuses to pay Greengrass for a paving job, claiming poor workmanship. When Stringer's son disappears, the police investigate David but it is an opportunistic criminal who makes the ransom demand. Phil Bellamy plays Father Christmas at the pub raffle.
161	11	"Sylvia's Mother"	Diana Patrick	Gillian Richmond	7 January 2001	13.70
A fish and chip shop is burned down and suspicion initially falls on the fiancé of the owner's sister, but an interesting story emerges from investigation of the electricity bills. An old flame makes advances toward Lord Ashfordly, inviting him into her consortium. Blaketon distrusts the woman's motives but is too late to save Ashfordly. A surprise farewell party is held for Maggie, who accepts a job at a hospital.
162	12	"Safe House"	Gerry Mill	Peter Gibbs	14 January 2001	13.71
Greengrass has left Aidensfield (off-screen) to be with his sister Bella in the Caribbean, leaving behind his property, truck and Alfred in David's hands. but David soon finds himself with financial problems, until Bernie's half-brother, Vernon Scripps, arrives after a 15-year absence and offers his assistance. Meanwhile, with Craddock absent from police work all week, Jackie finds out that Mike is providing a safe house for a mentally ill witness, who is wanted dead by men seeking to stop him making an appearance in court. [Bill Maynard had decided to retire from his role as Claude Greengrass because of ill-health.]
163	13	"Blind Justice"	Paul Walker	Neil McKay	21 January 2001	13.82
Irresponsible young driver Richard Finlay runs Lord Ashfordly off the road, but after he is let off with a caution by Sgt Craddock, he swiftly causes more trouble with a hit-and-run collision with a bicycle. When the judge presiding over his trial lets him off, Ashfordly police question the reasoning behind the decision. Meanwhile, Bernie goes absent from the garage, leaving Vernon to take over the repairs for Lord Ashfordly's car.
164	14	"Home Truths"	Diana Patrick	Gil Braley	28 January 2001	13.06
A collapse at a quarry hospitalises a worker, who raises complaints regarding unpaid wages and compensation. When the worker becomes the prime suspect in the murder of the quarry foreman's wife, Jackie agrees to represent him despite the disapproval of her client's mother. Meanwhile, Vernon's attempt to enter the catering business causes a power blackout, while Phil's relationship with Gina hits a problem when he learns that a police officer is not permitted to marry a pub licensee.
165	15	"Not So Special"	Noreen Kershaw	Michael Hall	4 February 2001	13.54
An elderly widow is having trouble maintaining her farm and complains of a prowler, while her niece wants her to sell up and move out. David has a car crash which mystifies police. A new special constable's actions cause problems for Phil. Ventress starts a rumour that Gina is pregnant. Vernon becomes involved in an illegal hot rod race across the moors.
166	16	"The Long Weekend"	Roger Bamford	Jane Hollowood	11 February 2001	13.69
Vernon becomes a bodyguard, hired by Ashfordly to protect a Russian guest, Prince Nikolas. Mike hosts his niece Anne and her friend Louise, both teenage hippies. Alcohol and drugs are consumed, leading to Louise almost dying, but she is saved by Dr. Summerbee who has taken over Neil's old practice. Phil submits his resignation from the police and plans a grand romantic proposal to Gina, and despite a series of mix-ups from David, he pops the question.
167	17	"Who's Who?"	Diana Patrick	Perter Gibbs	18 February 2001	13.15
Lord Ashfordly hosts high sheriff Andrew Parkin and his wife Sonia for dinner, but Parkin makes an unwelcome advance on a young servant girl, who fends him off by kicking his leg. Afterwards, a farmer trying to get some cows off the road is struck by the Parkins' car. They tell police that Sonia was driving, but Mike suspects otherwise. The servant girl tells Blaketon, hired as a private investigator, that Andrew was driving. But then Blaketon learns that she was dismissed by Ashfordly for dishonesty. Vernon tries the matchmaking business again, with unwelcome results for David. Phil proposes to Gina again, but she says "no", leading him to withdraw his resignation from the police, which Craddock has not forwarded to head office.
168	18	"Gin a Body, Meet a Body"	Paul Walker	Peter Finch	25 February 2001	12.67
David has a telephone installed, but new neighbour Edith Fairley is constantly engaging the two-party line, much to the chagrin of Vernon. When her ex-husband comes looking for her, Vernon offers to help if it means he can get calls for his new taxi business. Local criminal Harry North arrives with a friend and their girlfriend, who soon cause trouble, leading Mike to be creative in their capture.
169	19	"Killing Me Softly"	Roger Bamford	Helen Blizard	4 March 2001	12.78
Counterfeit money appears with no apparent pattern. A former casino barman strikes a deal with police to trap the casino owner and his ring of counterfeiters before they can expand their operation. Blaketon investigates an illicit affair. He purchases a sports car from Vernon, but detectives from Middlesbrough come to investigate the "red hot" vehicle.
170	20	"Unchained Melody"	Gerry Mill	Susan Wilkins	11 March 2001	12.89
Patricia Brewster and her unwelcome "partner" Hal Tadcaster are staying at Ashfordly estate. The police suspect Hal of drug trafficking but cannot obtain a phone tapping permit. The Royal Mail postmen go on strike, prompting Vernon to become a courier, though he is hired to transport live animals and Hal wants him to deliver a package to London. Jackie's friend Caroline visits and leaves Jackie and Mike with her infant child which disappears, launching a search. The disappearance is solved after Patricia collapses.
171	21	"Truth Games"	Paul Walker	Jane Hollowood	18 March 2001	12.84
Businessman Adrian Miller is accused of rape and bail conditions prevent him from returning to London, causing him displeasure with his assigned solicitor, Jackie. Mike discovers several similar cases, and a demand for hush money is made by serial extortionists. While ploughing a field, David discovers what he believes to be a hidden body; it is actually a statue, which leads Vernon to discover insurance fraud. After he is exonerated, Adrian shows a romantic interest in Jackie.
172	22	"Consequences"	Gerry Poulson	Johnny Byrne	25 March 2001	13.04
The victims of two explosions had received warning notes and silent phone calls, leading police to believe that they were murder attempts. Forensics determine that the PE4 explosive devices used were stolen from a nearby army base. Lord Ashfordly hires Vernon and David to remove material from a disused church. Learning of a valuable font which Vernon had earlier removed, David and Vernon return it with expectations of a reward. Rev. Ronald Meeks's trustworthiness is questioned. Blaketon receives silent calls and Gina a warning letter before realising her connection to the other victims. Jackie has been working on a divorce case for the assumed perpetrator.
173	23	"The Buxton Defence"	Noreen Kershaw	Brian Finch	1 April 2001	12.19
After a series of local burglaries, Lord Ashfordly requests a police presence while hosting a Russian chess champion, but antique chess sets then go missing from the house. In helping to track down the burglar, Mike also helps to prevent an attempted kidnapping. When David hears that Claude Greengrass is putting the house up for sale, Vernon tells potential purchasers various tales to dissuade them, and then buys the house himself for a bargain price, obtaining a mortgage fraudulently by offering Bernie's garage as security without his permission. Mike becomes concerned by Jackie's cool and distant demeanour as she leaves for an extended trip to attend a trial, and also later when he has trouble contacting her.
174	24	"Still Water"	Gerry Mill	Peter Gibbs	8 April 2001	13.25
A local auctioneer is suspected of rigging their livestock market in favour of four dominant buyers. Mike finds himself in trouble when the CID are called in to investigate allegations that he is taking bribes and is further shocked when Jackie admits their marriage has no future when she reveals the truth about her recent absence. Meanwhile, Vernon decides to sell bottled water from a spring on a visiting friend's property but encounters numerous obstacles.

=== Series 11 (2001–2002) ===
No. overall	No. in series	Title	Directed by	Written by	Original release date	UK viewers (millions)
175	1	"Sweet Sixteen"	Paul Walker	Jane Hollowood	28 October 2001	12.03
A series of attacks on police property occur as Sgt Craddock is concentrated on an upcoming inspection of Ashfordly police station. It transpires that the attacks are connected to a recent death involving a police officer. Dr Summerbee is confronted by angry parents over her decision to prescribe contraceptive pills to their 16-year-old daughter. Vernon and David quarrel following strange events in their cottage, until they discover they have an uninvited house guest.
176	2	"She's Leaving Home"	Noreen Kershaw	Johnny Byrne	4 November 2001	11.67
The young man who attacked Ashfordly police escapes custody while being held on remand. At the same time, his 16-year-old girlfriend runs away to be with him, but misadventure gives her on-the-run boyfriend a decision to make. Meanwhile, PC Bradley deals with a journalist whose story in the local newspaper causes trouble for Summerbee, which becomes worse when drugs are stolen from her surgery. Vernon decides to run a business with slot machines, unaware someone is prepared to do anything to keep him out of his business.
177	3	"Russian Roulette"	Jonas Grimas	Brian Finch	11 November 2001	11.61
An MI5 agent with whom PC Bradley had worked in the past arrives in the area with a need for Ashfordly police's assistance. They soon find themselves conducting surveillance on Vernon, who happens to be doing business with a Russian sailor he worked with, unaware they seek revenge for a past grievance. However, Bradley suspects that the investigation will soon turn out to be a wild goose chase. Meanwhile, Dr. Summerbee finds herself dealing with a manic depressive with a habit of walking onto railway lines.
178	4	"Legacies"	Gerry Mill	Peter Gibbs	18 November 2001	11.79
Tom Nicholson, a probationary constable transferred to Ashfordly police station after an embarrassing incident, helps in an investigation into stolen African artifacts belonging to Lord Ashfordly. However, the matter soon turns out to be complicated when it transpires the thefts coincide with an African chieftain's visit seeking to reclaim something taken from his tribe by Ashfordly's ancestor. Meanwhile, David struggles with the taxi service, leading Vernon to take over and discover how tough it can be himself. [First appearance of PC Tom Nicholson]
179	5	"Home Sweet Home"	Gerry Poulson	John Flanagan & Andrew McCulloch	25 November 2001	12.16
Ashfordly police find themselves investigating a series of odd thefts, which PC Bradley feels is connected to a local nursing home. At the same time, Oscar questions whether the home's owner is conning her residents into signing new wills. However, matters become complicated when the postmortem of a resident, who died in natural circumstances, uncovers that they were given medication that was not prescribed to them. Meanwhile, David takes up work for a local clearance business, but accidentally removes property from a man with whom the police usually have difficulties.
180	6	"Old Masters"	Noreen Kershaw	Douglas Watkinson	2 December 2001	11.85
Lord Ashfordly opens up his hall to tourists, with Vernon allowed to work as a tour guide. An 80-year-old thief takes advantage of the situation and manages to steal a set of valuable art sketches but is soon the victim of foul play when someone breaks into his home searching for his loot. After the thief suffers a fatal attack when being interrogated and the sketches turn out not to have been stolen by the person who broke in, Ashfordly police question whether their suspect had an accomplice at the hall.
181	7	"The Rivals"	Paul Walker	Jane McNulty	9 December 2001	12.05
A carpet factory owner finds himself in trouble when an industrial accident leads him to decide to sell up, much to the anger of his workers. However, matters become complicated when he is later found badly injured, shortly after someone is seen running away, raising questions on his midnight activities behind his wife's back. Meanwhile, Vernon decides to set up a beauty pageant in Aidensfield with the local Women's Institutes, but faces trouble from Joyce Jowett, who is determined to halt the event.
182	8	"Home to Roost"	Diana Patrick	Jayne Hollison	16 December 2001	11.07
A short-tempered landlord attempts to evict a group of hippies who are squatting in derelict cottages he intends to renovate. However, when a group of men try to violently remove them, PC Bradley discovers a journalist amongst the group who is willing to do anything to make a front-page story. Meanwhile, Dr. Summerbee does her best to help one of the hippies who is pregnant, while Vernon opts to create a pottery enterprise which does not go as well as planned.
183	9	"Uninvited Guests"	Paul Walker	Douglas Watkinson	23 December 2001	10.64
A building society manager and her son are taken hostage by criminals looking to rob her workplace. She manages to send a cry for help to PC Ventress, leading to Ashfordly police conducting surveillance to determine how best to save the hostages and capture the culprits. Meanwhile, Dr. Summerbee struggles with tracking down the source of a salmonella outbreak, leading to her pharmacist friend Jenny joining her practice, while Vernon decides to run a pet funeral service.
184	10	"No Hiding Place"	Jonas Grimas	Brian Finch	30 December 2001	11.00
At Christmas, PC Bradley tries to find a blind woman's missing guide dog, and discovers the culprit is emotionally attached to the animal. Dr. Summerbee is delighted when an old friend visits for the holiday, but calls for Bradley's help when she suspects her friend is in serious trouble. Meanwhile, Vernon promises to supply a Christmas tree with lights for the village at his expense, but David has a mishap with the lights. [Guest star: Sophia Myles]
185	11	"A Gentlemen's Sport"	Noreen Kershaw	Paul Quiney	6 January 2002	8.94
PC Bradley investigates an armed robbery by two men after one of them is arrested following an accident. At the same time, Oscar is starstruck when a cricketing legend checks in at the Aidensfield Arms. However, Bradley soon discovers that the incidents are connected, when the captured robber attempts to find their partner, revealing the cricketing star's past. Meanwhile, David inadvertently creates a petrol crisis for the area, when he takes ownership of a barrel of diesel that Bernie discovers was stolen.
186	12	"Closing the Book"	Diana Patrick	Johnny Byrne	13 January 2002	9.18
Sgt Craddock contemplates his future when his wife Penny returns to the area. At the same time, Ashfordly police discover plans on a series of unsolved crimes in the possession of a recently deceased man. Craddock soon discovers the man was making plans for an armed raid for a gang, who are set on carrying it out regardless. Meanwhile, Vernon launches his latest tourism venture involving gypsy caravans, but soon has regrets with the horses he uses for them. [Final appearance of Sgt Raymond Craddock]
187	13	"The Leopard's Spots"	Roger Bamford	Peter Gibbs	20 January 2002	10.28
Sgt Dennis Merton arrives under disrepute following his demotion from CID, as DI Shiner calls on Ashfordly police to help with a stakeout operation on a known criminal. However, it soon causes problems for PC Ventress, when his arrest of the criminal's son leads to his past involvement with them coming to light. Meanwhile, Vernon decides to become the manager to a naïve trainee boxer, but seeking to make him a decent fighter leads him to taking action that he soon regrets. [First appearance of Sgt Dennis Merton]
188	14	"From Ancient Grudge"	Noreen Kershaw	Andrew McCulloch	27 January 2002	10.62
A romance between octogenarian lovebirds is jeopardised when an old feud between their families over a contested plot of land is reignited by a spate of incidents against each side. Ashfordly police try to maintain the peace until the matter turns violent, whereupon PC Bradley discovers a third party may be the culprit and is after the land for themselves. Meanwhile, Vernon opens a mobile cinema business but struggles to ensure it will show acceptable films to Jowett's liking.
189	15	"The Great Ming Mystery"	Paul Walker	Jane Hollowood	3 February 2002	11.15
Sgt Merton refuses to allow an investigation into a couple who recently arrived in the area, after PC Bradley suspects they might be involved in the disappearance of a Ming vase. At the same time, Oscar has suspicions of a new guest at the Aidensfield Arms, who arrived at the same time and is working with the couple. It transpires that the couple are part of an extremist group seeking to abduct an important VIP, unaware that their friend is an undercover Special Branch officer seeking to prevent them.
190	16	"Second Chances"	Diana Patrick	Douglas Watkinson	10 February 2002	10.62
PC Ventress is shocked when the suspect in a break-in turns out to be the son of a man who was presumed dead twenty years ago, after becoming the prime suspect in a theft. However, when his father is brought back to the area for questioning, Sgt Merton becomes suspicious of a former CID detective who investigated the theft at the time. Meanwhile, PC Bradley and Dr. Summerbee become romantically involved after getting lost during a treasure hunt, and Vernon opts to start a vineyard business.
191	17	"Sympathy for the Devil"	Roger Bamford	Jeff Dodds	17 February 2002	9.92
PC Bradley befriends a woman whose daughter resents being dragged away with her, straining his relationship with Dr. Summerbee. However, he soon learns that the woman is being hounded by a ruthless reporter, who is intent on exposing her dark past, forcing her to make a decision that will break her daughter's heart. Meanwhile, Vernon and David decide to raise goats for their milk, but Bernie is forced to ask Oscar for help when they cause trouble around Aidensfield.
192	18	"Coming of Age"	Gerry Mill	Andrew McCulloch	24 February 2002	10.93
PC Nicholson looks forward to his 21st birthday, unaware his friends and colleagues are planning a surprise party for him. However, he soon finds himself placed in an impossible situation when he and PC Bellamy come across two criminals hiding on the Ashfordly Estate, wanted for an armed robbery. When Bellamy is shot, Nicholson offers to take his place, setting in motion a chain of events that end in tragedy. Meanwhile, Vernon becomes the agent for a local brass band, which Lord Ashfordly regrets when he asks them to perform for a group of American war veterans. [Final appearance of PC Tom Nicholson]
193	19	"Love Hurts"	Bren Simson	John Flanagan	3 March 2002	10.32
Sgt Merton is shocked when his new girlfriend comes into Ashfordly police station to accuse him of theft. Not wanting to lose another officer, PC Bradley risks suspension to investigate the matter, and with Oscar's help, discovers that Merton is being targeted by a criminal with a deep grudge against him. Meanwhile, Vernon becomes concerned over Bernie's changing mood and frequent visits to the surgery, until he discovers what is causing them.
194	20	"Windows of Opportunity"	Paul Walker	Douglas Watkinson	10 March 2002	9.05
Ashfordly police find themselves investigating a string of burglaries in the area, in which the burglar only steals objects of sentimental value from people's homes. While PC Ventress tries to prevent the latest victim taking action, it becomes clear that the link between the targets is a local window cleaner, who soon seeks help when he learns how much trouble he is in. Meanwhile, Oscar recruits aid from David as he runs against Jowett in the local parish election, and Dr. Summerbee organises a fitness class that leads her to reveal to PC Bradley an underlying health condition she has.
195	21	"The Shoot"	Noreen Kershaw	Brian Finch	17 March 2002	9.40
A businessman comes to Ashfordly Hall with his wife to set up a shooting party, but swiftly incurs the wrath of a local man who seeks revenge for having his dog shot by him. Ashfordly police investigate when the businessman is later shot, and they discover that he is unfaithful to his wife. Meanwhile, Vernon has to go to hospital and reluctantly leaves his latest tourist enterprise in David's hands, which soon ends in disaster.
196	22	"Class Act"	Roger Bamford	Peter Gibbs	31 March 2002	9.95
An overprotective father who struggles to keep his daughter happy becomes a suspect in a robbery at the butcher shop he works at. However, his daughter soon causes problems when she develops a crush on her schoolteacher that creates an out-of-control situation. Meanwhile, Vernon is driven mad by David when he inherits a ventriloquist's dummy and decides to complete a dead man's list of bookings.
197	23	"Caught in the Headlights"	Jonas Grimas	Peter Gibbs	7 April 2002	11.89
Following her attendance of a dinner party at Ashfordly Hall with a visiting businessman, Gina becomes the prime suspect in a hit-and-run accident that causes the death of a visiting surveyor. Oscar is unconvinced she is guilty, especially when a blood test reveals someone gave her a spiked drink that knocked her out. PC Bradley soon comes to the same conclusion when he learns that the surveyor and businessman knew each other and had been insider knowledge about an upcoming road project. Meanwhile, Vernon offers to chauffeur and bodyguard two teenage girls for their overprotective father, but soon regrets making it when he has to deal with the constant loud noise he has to endure.
198	24	"Love's Sweet Dream"	Gerry Mill	Jane Hollowood	14 April 2002	10.40
PC Bradley contemplates his future with Dr. Summerbee, as both become concerned in a case of a wife who suffers a miscarriage. They soon suspect her husband of abusing her, but in seeking to get her to safety, Summerbee finds herself put in danger. Meanwhile, Vernon decides to take over catering for future funerals, but while he enjoys going into business with a woman who can help, it upsets Bernard and David as well as Gina, while the arrival of her troublesome daughter only makes things worse.

=== Arrivals ===
- PC Tom Nicholson – ("Legacies", Episode 4)
- Sgt Dennis Merton – ("The Leopard's Spots", Episode 13)

=== Departures ===
- Sgt Raymond Craddock – ("Closing the Book", Episode 12) Transitioned to DS and transferred to Greater Manchester Police's CID
- PC Tom Nicholson – ("Coming of Age", Episode 18) Died on duty

=== Series 12 (2002–2003) ===
No. overall	No. in series	Title	Directed by	Written by	Original release date	UK viewers (millions)
199	1	"Skeletons and Cupboards"	Noreen Kershaw	John Flanagan	6 October 2002	10.73
Oscar is shocked when a criminal he knew turns up alive in the area fifteen years after he was certified dead by PC Ventress and a CID detective. At the same time, Ashfordly police deal with a spate of vandalism on a housing estate, and the murder of a man who recently arrived, and soon discover all three matters are connected. Meanwhile, Vernon decides to get a regular job at a department store after his many entrepreneurial setbacks, unaware of how short-lived it will be.
200	2	"A Girl's Best Friend"	Albert Barber	Gillian Richmond	13 October 2002	10.48
PC Bradley discovers that a wealthy woman has an unhappy marriage with her abusive husband while investigating the circumstances behind the theft of a necklace they own. However, when she leaves him without her medication, it soon sets off a series of events that lead to violence. Meanwhile, Vernon dabbles with hypnotism but gets more than he bargains for when he unwittingly hypnotises David, and Sgt Merton becomes infatuated with Jenny.
201	3	"A Dog's Life"	Gerry Mill	Susan Wilkins	20 October 2002	10.51
As Ashfordly Hall prepares to hold the annual county sheepdog trials, PC Bradley and Sgt Merton find their hands full when the rivalry between two of the contestants causes unexpected trouble. Meanwhile, Vernon tries to impress Lord Ashfordly during the event by helping to organises its toilet facilities but finds that his plans do not go as smoothly as he hopes for.
202	4	"Where There's Muck"	Judith Dine	Douglas Watkins	3 November 2002	9.85
A bankrupt farmer becomes the centre of attention for Ashfordly police, who worry about what he will do as his farm, livestock and equipment are auctioned off by the bank. However, the matter is complicated when a guest staying at the Aidensfield Arms transpires to be a known criminal and is targeting the auction. Meanwhile, Vernon decides to market the horseradish sauce of David's aunt in his latest get rich quick scheme, but finds it has an unexpected side effect for himself.
203	5	"Harmony"	Noreen Kershaw	Peter Gibbs	10 November 2002	11.80
Sgt Merton's singer-songwriter cousin aims to settle down in Aidensfield, until her aspiring daughter turns up and reveals she is pregnant. The matter becomes tense when her father and manager turns up, moments before an escape armed robber turns up and takes them hostage. Meanwhile, David finds himself helping out a grieving daughter with the running of her family's greengrocer store, after her father dies in his taxi, but swiftly finds her overbearing.
204	6	"No Man's Land"	Paul Walker	Peter Gibbs	17 November 2002	12.10
The owner of a local ramblers shop causes problems for a belligerent landowner who wants him to stop sending people crossing over his land. PC Bradley tries to calm things down, but soon discovers that the landowner's mental health is severely being compromised by the situation. Meanwhile, Vernon undergoes a personality change after a freak accident, but while many enjoy him becoming a pillar of the community, David and Bernie worry he could become bankrupt with his charitable nature.
205	7	"Dirty Len"	Albert Barber	Jane Hollowood	24 November 2002	11.21
Sgt Merton and PC Bradley discover that a farm labourer and a number of animals died from strychnine, and begin a hunt to track down the source of the poison. At the same time, a young mother organising a pensioner's day trip to Whitby decides to allow David to assist, despite her father being reluctant to join her. When one of her daughter succumbs to the poison under Gina's care, her father is forced to confess to Oscar about the truth concerning the poisonings.
206	8	"Growing Apart"	Jonas Grimas	Candy Denman	1 December 2002	11.38
PC Bradley and Sgt Merton suspect a local farmer of being involved in a spate of tractor thefts for an insurance dealer, as part of an elaborate insurance scheme. However, when his actions are found out by his wife, whose health has been poorly, their already difficult marriage turns into a volatile domestic situation that soon endangers both herself and Dr. Summerbee. Meanwhile, Vernon starts a landscape gardening business, but resents allowing David to help source the materials for their first job.
207	9	"Many Splendoured Thing"	Roger Bamford	Susan Watkins	8 December 2002	11.75
Lord Ashfordly returns home from a cruise with a charming new wife and decides to throw a spectacular Christmas party to celebrate. However, when the couple are targeted by criminals, it becomes clear that Ashfordly's new wife is hiding something from her husband. Meanwhile, Bernie faces trouble when Mrs Jowett threatens to boycott his funeral parlour when she needs a service arranged for her recently departed sister, and David has problems running Vernon's Christmas tree delivery service.
208	10	"Horses for Courses"	Noreen Kershaw	John Flanagan	15 December 2002	10.80
PC Bradley works with Scotland Yard detectives who suspect a valuable horse is to be stolen from a local horse trainer. The situation puts an extra strain on Bradley's already troubled relationship with Dr. Summerbee, but when she becomes caught up in events, there is a tragic outcome. Vernon is visited by another half-sibling, Georgina, who gets on well with Lord Ashfordly but causes problems for her half-brother.
209	11	"Sins of The Fathers"	Terry Dydden-Jones	Brian Finch	22 December 2002	11.58
PC Bradley, mourning the loss of Dr. Summerbee, finds himself dealing with a young offender who recently arrived from London. He soon becomes suspicious of a local magistrate, after the offender, having caused trouble, is deliberately hit by a car after trying to see them. Meanwhile, Vernon helps an old flame sell an engagement ring, until their husband turns up and reveals its stolen, and Jenny is surprised when Summerbee's replacement, Dr. Alway, arrives a day early to take over the village practice.
210	12	"Bread and Circuses"	Jonas Grimas	Niel McKay	29 December 2002	9.86
Ashfordly police find they have a man with a record in Aidensfield, who was involved in a crime spree in Whitby. Investigating the matter, they discover a link between the latest targets and a new arrival to the village. Meanwhile, Vernon offers to help a travelling circus find somewhere to set up a winter camp, but Lord Ashfordly soon regrets agreeing to his request when Vernon tries to capitalise on the situation.
211	13	"For Whom the Bell Tolls"	Noreen Kershaw	Peter Gibbs	5 January 2003	11.77
Blaketon returns from his eventful holiday in Spain, only to find himself hired by Lord Ashfordly to investigate a local quarry. When Blaketon is nearly killed in an explosion, Ashfordly police discover there are explosives missing and find themselves hunting for them before an upcoming visit by a national politician. Meanwhile, Dr Alway offers help to a local church by recruiting Vernon, David and Bernie to become bell ringers, but they soon face problems from a local man who is trying to sell his cottage.
212	14	"Out of the Blue"	Paul Walker	Jane Hollowood	12 January 2003	12.84
Aidensfield villagers face a health crisis when the water supply becomes polluted. Although the cause initially seems to be the crash of a stolen tanker that Vernon and David had been driving, the source of the pollution is traced back to a local waterworks. PC Bradley is uncertain that the foreman is responsible, and has suspicious on a former worker. At the same time, Sgt Merton is forced to get Vernon to confess to where the tanker came from, after a man threatens him for payment over its cargo.
213	15	"The High Life"	Bob Tomson	Susan Watkins	9 March 2003	10.87
Jenny is delighted when her younger brother Steve visits and offers to help him secure a job. She soon finds her excitement turn to despair when a local vicar that employs him turns out to be growing something unwelcome in his greenhouse, threatening her relationship with Sgt Merton. Meanwhile, David finds himself being recruited by a gang of mods who have begun causing trouble in Aidensfield.
214	16	"Hung for a Sheep"	Gerry Mill	John Flanagan	16 March 2003	11.36
PC Steve Crane arrives to replace Mike after his transfer into CID, and Steve finds himself investigating a series of break-ins. He soon learns that the farmers who were targeted are unwilling for help, and that they have a secret they do not want exposed. Meanwhile, Dr. Liz Merrick arrives in Aidensfield to take over from Dr. Alway, after he quits the village surgery, and recruits Vernon and David to help her get word out of her arrival. [First appearance of PC Steve Crane]
215	17	"The Third Man"	Noreen Kershaw	Candy Denman	23 March 2003	10.74
An informant tips off DC Bradley into a hijacking of a gold bullion shipment by a known crime boss. However, DI Shiner's plan to ambush the suspects goes awry when the shipment is hijacked at another location, forcing Bradley to investigate what exactly happened. Meanwhile, Gina's wayward niece arrives in Aidensfield but is horrified to learn she is infatuated with an escaped criminal, and Vernon and David offer to help redecorate the village surgery.
216	18	"Missing in Action"	Jonas Grimas	Peter Gibbs	30 March 2003	11.04
After a meeting with a funfair clairvoyant, a bride-to-be postpones her wedding until she and her fiancé can locate the remains of a pilot who went missing in action during the Second World War. When PC Crane offers help, he causes problems when he incurs the wrath of the Ministry of Defence. Meanwhile, DC Bradley and PC Bellamy become concerned when a bogus police officer appears, causing problems for many despite his good intentions.
217	19	"Caped Crusaders"	Terry Dyddgen-Jones	Brian Finch	6 April 2003	11.29
Dr. Merrick is targeted by an unknown person making late night phone calls, leading PC Crane and Sgt Merton to discover the matter may be linked to her past in London. Meanwhile, DC Bradley hunts for a pair of counterfeiters and gains an unlikely lead from two young boys who received forged notes from them. Vernon is delighted when he stands to inherit a house, but soon suffers a string of bad luck.
218	20	"Moving Target"	Bob Tomson	Susan Wilkins	13 April 2003	10.99
Aidensfield is terrorised by a sniper, who murders Liz's ex-boyfriend, a married doctor with whom she had had an affair. While Liz attempts to comfort the widow, Bellamy is shot in the arm. Merton and Shiner fear the police are targets as the assailant is using an Army-issue weapon. Mike receives a job offer that will change his career. Meanwhile, a newcomer in a Bentley limousine impresses Gina and David, for different reasons. [Final appearance of DC Mike Bradley]
219	21	"Lily of the Valley"	Judith Dine	Peter Gibbs	20 April 2003	9.24
When an attempt to remedy vandalism and petty theft at a farm is seen as interference, Gina sends Susie to match the old farmer's feisty spirit. The activity escalates to arson, and Steve suspects a deeper motive behind the crimes. Meanwhile, David is arrested while protesting at the high number of lorries passing through the village to Jim Pinder's quarry, while Vernon is viewed as a traitor for chauffeuring Pinder.
220	22	"House Rules"	Gerry Mill	John Flanagan	27 April 2003	10.06
Steve Crane's eccentric mother Babs arrives unexpectedly, having separated from her screenwriter boyfriend and grown tired of the London arts scene. She becomes popular with the locals, especially Blaketon. Short of money, she sells some paintings to several people, which leads to one of Vernon's schemes actually coming up trumps for him. A spate of local burglaries provide Babs with an opportunity to practise her self-defence skills. Meanwhile, Gina begins dating a guest at the pub who immediately gets on the wrong side of a suspicious Blaketon, and the police.
221	23	"Mackerel Sky"	Jonas Grimas	Niel McKay	4 May 2003	9.31
A dying ex-convict kidnaps Jenny to extort Merton into revealing the informant responsible for his eight-year prison sentence, but the informant has already died, worsening the criminal's state of mind and the danger to Jenny. Steve and the rest of the team investigate sports car thefts. Meanwhile, Vernon is enjoying his new-found wealth and invites himself to join Blaketon at a fundraiser for an old people's home. After befriending the host, he offers to organise a charity antique sale, but the event does not go as planned. Gina and Bellamy rekindle their relationship.
222	24	"Absent Friends"	Bob Tomson	Jane Hollowood	11 May 2003	9.86
Merton organises a search of the moors after a farming couple are reported missing, leaving Jenny and Liz to look after their bemused children, whilst Gina and Phil temporally take over at the farm. Meanwhile, Vernon decides to treat his nearest and dearest following his windfall and takes a reluctant Bernie to a posh country hotel.
223	25	"Music of The Spheres"	Noreen Kershaw	Susan Wilkins	18 May 2003	9.65
Lord Ashfordly's sister Patricia returns with a renowned Polish musician to stage a concert at the village hall. While investigating the theft of an expensive violin, Steve falls in love with the musician's daughter, to her father's disapproval. Meanwhile, Vernon and Bernie's shady Liverpudlian cousins, Big and Little Jim, ask him to make a large investment. Gina discovers their scheme but has difficulty convincing Vernon of their treachery. Jenny accepts Merton's marriage proposal.

=== Arrivals ===
- PC Steve Crane – ("Hung for a Sheep", Episode 16)

=== Departures ===
- DC Mike Bradley – Transfers to Westminster CID, after his secondment to Ashfordly Police ends. ("Moving Target", Episode 20)

=== Series 13 (2003–2004) ===
No. overall	No. in series	Title	Directed by	Written by	Original release date	UK viewers (millions)
224	1	"Speed"	Paul Walker	John Flanagan	7 September 2003	10.45
Merton is under pressure to prevent a youth gang from entering the drug trade. While visiting Jenny at the surgery, he checks the patient lists to determine who supplied them with amphetamines, and Jenny calls off their wedding. Steve tries to gain the trust of a young biker and his girlfriend in order to arrest the bullying ringleader. Meanwhile, David and Bernie lose patience with Vernon's affected manner, especially when he employs a chauffeur who used to do menial tasks for royalty. Vernon searches for a suitable residence and becomes a suspect when bronze figures are stolen immediately after he views a mansion. Bellamy treats Gina to a hotel holiday in the Highlands.
225	2	"Dog Days"	Jonas Grimas	Brian Finch	14 September 2003	7.91
With Phil absent from police work all week, Steve investigates a fire at a textile warehouse and learns that the owner's wife is a convicted fraudster, leading Merton to suspect the blaze was the outcome of a marital feud. Meanwhile, Vernon moves into his mansion, but David is not too keen on joining him. Trying to impress his neighbours, Vernon partners with a silver-tongued housewife to provide horse-drawn hearses. However, he finds himself having to choose between his new friend and surrogate son David. Elsewhere, tensions boil over between Jenny and Merton following their cancelled wedding.
226	3	"Mother's Little Helpers"	Andrew Morgan	Peter Gibbs	21 September 2003	10.54
One of Liz's patients develops a drinking problem while her husband is abroad, having left her with two mischievous boys. Liz's attempts to help lead to trouble with Steve when she is caught drink driving. Meanwhile, a gambling addict kidnaps David and demands a ransom from Vernon. Bellamy and Gina return from their hotel holiday with the news that they are expecting a baby.
227	4	"Fool for Love (Dennis Merton's and Jenny Latimer's wedding)"	Paul Walker	Susan Wilkins	5 October 2003	9.54
It is Dennis and Jenny's big day, although the event does not go according to plan when a former CID colleague of Merton's asks the team to track down an ageing bank robber known as "Ronnie the dog man". Jenny's disgraced brother Steve returns, claiming to be a changed man and desperate to make amends. Meanwhile, Vernon promises Jenny that he will catch a wild salmon for the wedding, only for Bernie to be more successful than him. Bellamy turns to Blaketon for help when Gina becomes convinced that he only wants to marry her because of the pregnancy.
228	5	"A Family Affair"	Frank W.Smith	Candy Denman	12 October 2003	10.17
With Merton on honeymoon, acting Sgt. Ventress searches for a bogus waterboard official who has been robbing the elderly, but his attention turns to a suspicious death linked to one of the burglary victims. Meanwhile, Blaketon restages a pre-war darts tournament with a rival pub, the White Lion, to reclaim a silver trophy that the Aidensfield Arms had originally won. David is upset when Blaketon rejects him as a team member and joins the White Lion darts team instead. Gina faces an obstacle to her impending marriage to Bellamy when she learns police rules do not allow wives to hold a pub licence.
229	6	"The Holiday's Over"	Jonas Grimas	Neil McKay	19 October 2003	10.76
Merton and Jenny's honeymoon is cut short when Jenny becomes ill. Merton finds Ventress has let standards slip in his absence, incurring the wrath of an inspector whose car is stolen. The team hurry to recover the vehicle and the station's reputation, when a crooked travel agent takes advantage of absent holidaymakers. While organising a Bentley rally at Ashfordly Hall, Vernon is persuaded to invest all his money through Lloyd's of London insuring the ill-fated Torrey Canyon, and he is financially ruined. Gina is displeased at the prospect of giving up the pub licence to marry Bellamy.
230	7	"Waifs and Strays"	Andrew Morgan	Richard Monks	26 October 2003	10.84
Steve and Liz help a young woman fight a custody battle for her orphaned siblings following their father's death. It affects Blaketon, who was a good friend of the father, and reminds Steve of his own childhood. One of the parentless children becomes linked to a series of break-ins. Meanwhile, Vernon bounces back after losing his fortune by opening up a caravan park, but the campers are unimpressed when David arranges entertainments.
231	8	"Brought to Book"	Noreen Kershaw	John Flanagan	2 November 2003	10.73
Blaketon asks Steve to accompany a group of delinquents on an outdoor adventure course on the moors, but a pair of cousins join the trip with an ulterior motive. Vernon brokers the rental of Ashfordly Hall to a religious sect for a meditation convention. Steve's mother Babs returns and gains employment as assistant librarian to Jowett, but finds it difficult to fit in. Gina confronts Phil and tells him that she will not accept having to give up her pub licence.
232	9	"State of Mind"	Judith Dine	Candy Denman	9 November 2003	10.53
With Merton absent from police work for two weeks, An elderly man reports an unusual break-in, in which a statuette was left on his kitchen table, and this is followed by other unexplained events, including cement he did not order being delivered to his house and a fire breaking out in his garden shed. Though discouraged by acting Sergeant Jennifer Nokes, Steve's curiosity leads him to investigate further. Vernon is called for jury service. Gina decides to go to stay with relatives in Liverpool while considering her wedding dilemma. [A reference to another popular TV series, Doctor Who, is made in the form of the TARDIS making several uncredited appearances.]
233	10	"Down to Earth"	Jonas Grimas	Jane Hollowood	22 February 2004	11.12
Vernon is left fighting for his life when he buys a batch of soil for a new compost-producing venture, which comes to be linked to a noxious odour causing friction between neighbours. Liz finds herself under pressure when the common cause is found to be anthrax. Steve is preoccupied when Ventress convinces him that Sgt Nokes fancies him. Gina's continuing absence has a profound effect on Bellamy.
234	11	"Mountains and Molehills"	Adrian Bean	Susan Wilkins	29 February 2004	10.63
A dysfunctional family causes personal troubles for the police officers when Bellamy accidentally runs down a local school boy whilst chasing joyriders. His father demands compensation and his sister, a maid at Ashfordly Hall, falls pregnant, claiming Steve is the father. Meanwhile, David is hired by Lord Ashfordly to rid his estate of moles.
235	12	"The Dear Departed"	Andrew Morgan	Brian Finch	7 March 2004	10.50
An ex-convict is killed after returning to Aidensfield, having claimed that he was wrongfully convicted of the murder of a local factory owner, and Blaketon is one of the many suspects. Meanwhile, a widow wants to bury her late husband in the family grave, but the dead man's brother refuses to co-operate because of a feud. Vernon and David attempt to broker peace and find themselves held at gunpoint as a shocking case of fraud comes to light.
236	13	"Dangerous Whispers"	Judith Dine	John Flanagan	14 March 2004	10.25
Gina returns and Bellamy's delight causes him to neglect a key informant, who disappears before he can provide a tip about an imminent armed robbery, spoiling Bellamy's career. Meanwhile, Lord Ashfordly hires land manager Ben Norton, who faces opposition protests when he prepares to demolish the cottages tied to the estate. Liz joins the protest alongside Jenny, causing sparks to fly between her and the newcomer, whilst Vernon buys a miniature railway from Lord Elisby's bankrupt estate in his latest scheme to impress the local aristocrats.
237	14	"Scent of a Kill"	Gerry Mill	Peter Gibbs	21 March 2004	9.98
Merton is reluctant to start a police investigation when one of Liz's patients becomes convinces that her husband is trying to kill her, until she is nearly killed by a runaway tractor. Meanwhile, Vernon's pest control solution jeopardises Aidensfield's chances of winning the "Best Kept Village" award, provoking Blaketon's wrath. Steve becomes attracted to Gina's cousin Diana, while Bellamy neglects his police work to plan the wedding and faces a dilemma regarding the choice of best man.
238	15	"Daniel"	Adrian Bean	Jane Hollowood	28 March 2004	10.70
Gina goes into premature labour after breaking up a brawl in the pub. Merton is delighted when his team bring a major LSD dealer to justice, but one officer develops a personal grudge and crosses a line.
239	16	"One Thing Leads to Another"	Andrew Morgan	Candy Denman	4 April 2004	10.33
Jenny falls victim to an elaborate savings and loan racket devised by a con man. Meanwhile, Vernon, Bernie and David become overcompetitive when they enter a poetry contest. Blaketon is concerned that Gina and Phil's grief over the loss of their baby is pushing them apart.
240	17	"No Hard Feelings"	Judith Dine	Susan Wilkins	11 April 2004	8.87
After Gina tells him that she does not want to marry him, Phil Bellamy's temper boils over and lands him in trouble with Sgt Merton. The police pursue a sniper who targets a shooter at a clay pigeon shoot. Vernon opens a bed-and-breakfast, but when David quits, Vernon has to do the cooking and gives himself and Alfred food poisoning. Although Gina tells Phil she still loves him, she convinces him to call off the wedding, and they agree just to be friends.
241	18	"Difficult Times"	Gerry Mill	Neil McKay	18 April 2004	10.42
Merton's police work has consequences for his marriage when he has to investigate Liz and his own wife after a former car racing driver dies from an insulin overdose. Vernon more than meets his match in a charismatic promoter of a pyramid selling scheme, who enrols Vernon to embark on a mission to make Aidensfield sparkle with a new brand of cleaning products.
242	19	"Nowhere Man"	Matt Bloom	Peter Mills	25 April 2004	9.30
Steve and Liz help an amnesiac piece together his identity, but it leads to a shocking case of domestic violence. Meanwhile, Bernie and David have to pick up the pieces when Vernon becomes morbid and sets out to make an everlasting impact on the world. Jenny informs Merton of a few unpleasant truths about their marriage.
243	20	"Swansong"	Declan O'Dwyer	Susan Wilkins	2 May 2004	9.09
After being told that he must now accept retirement, after previous postponements, Ventress' suspicions lead him and Blaketon to investigate the nighttime theft of sheep fleeces in the local countryside. Bernie finds himself in a difficult situation when an Australian arrives for the funeral of his estranged grandfather who has already been buried by the undertaker. Blaketon has to fend off the attentions of a local widow. [Final appearance of Alf Ventress as PC]
244	21	"Strangers on a Train"	Pip Short	Susan Wilkins	9 May 2004	10.21
David witnesses a man thrown from a moving train, which leads to Steve foiling an armed robbery at Ashfordly Hall and an escaped convict loose in Aidensfield. As the team pursue the fugitive, retired Ventress feels lost and is delighted when Merton offers a solution. Vernon is stalked by a donkey and tries to open a donkey sanctuary, failing to realise that the village already has one.
245	22	"A Call to Arms"	Judith Dine	Jane Hollowood	16 May 2004	8.83
The police are puzzled when a retired colleague of Ventress and Blaketon's seems to become the unlikely victim of vandalism. Suspicions arise over his sudden return to the village and his connection to a prominent judge staying at Ashfordly Hall. Meanwhile, Vernon encounters dangerous wildlife as he stashes cash in Ashfordly woods before a visit by a tax inspector but tries to turn the incident into another money-making scheme, leading him into further peril.
246	23	"Muck and Brass"	Noreen Kershaw	Duncan Ghould	23 May 2004	7.72
Merton is not happy at the prospects of dozens of dangerous drivers when Aidensfield hosts a prestigious automotive hill climb. The villagers are not happy either and the team race to prevent disaster when a saboteur begins causing chaos. Meanwhile, Bernie finds an old car in a cowshed and renovates it, giving Vernon a chance to scoop the winnings in the hill climb event.
247	24	"Double Trouble"	Gerry Mill	Johnny Byrne	30 May 2004	6.97
A burglary enquiry takes an unexpected turn when the victim is found to be leading a double life and the break-in may have been part of an insurance fraud. Meanwhile, Blaketon falls for the charms of a lady solicitor and joins Ventress to help her find the beneficiaries of an unusual bequest, but the ageing detectives struggle to work in a partnership. David is recruited as their driver, and finds himself acting as peacemaker.
248	25	"Little Angel"	Jonas Grimas	Jane Hollowood	6 June 2004	9.16
A little girl is missing, and Merton is convinced that her errant father has snatched her. Blaketon lends his expertise to the case, and in pursuit of the case he suffers a heart attack. Steve and Phil's attempt to rescue the youngster produces a tragic outcome when Steve dies in the performance of his duty. Meanwhile, Vernon offers his pest control services when the pub suffers a rat infestation. [Final appearance of PC Steve Crane]

=== Departures ===
- PC Steve Crane – Died on duty ("Little Angel", Episode 25)

=== Series 14 (2004–2005) ===
No. overall	No. in series	Title	Directed by	Written by	Original release date	UK viewers (millions)
249	1	"Money, Money, Money"	Roger Bamford	John Flanagan & Andrew McCulloch	5 September 2004	8.76
The villagers are amazed when Steve's replacement is Rob Walker, the son of a notorious gangster. As he deals with an arson case on his first day, Rob must tackle the repercussions of his father's past, in particular from Blaketon, who harbours a grudge against Rob. Meanwhile, Vernon and David are asked to decorate the house of an old man obsessed with Shakespeare. Liz and Ben's fundraising efforts brings out the charitable side of the most miserly residents, whilst Jenny and Merton try to put the past behind them. [First appearance of PC Rob Walker]
250	2	"Secrets and Lies"	Jonas Grimas	Johnny Byrne	12 September 2004	7.84
Merton is unimpressed by Rob's methods of dealing with a blackmailer who begins terrorising the owner of a refuge, one of Liz's patients, and the goddaughter of Ventress's wife. Meanwhile, Vernon, Bernie and David enter the publishing world with a famous publisher in desperate need of capital.
251	3	"Fakers and Frauds"	Adrian Bean	Richard Monks	19 September 2004	8.50
The police station's reputation comes under scrutiny when evidence suggests that someone from within the force is responsible for a string of burglaries. Meanwhile, Vernon hosts an exclusive painting weekend at Ashfordly Hall but is put in a compromising position by the absence of his life model. A businesswoman attempts to seduce David.
252	4	"The Happiest Day"	Andrew Morgan	Peter Gibbs	26 September 2004	9.01
A desperate family man trying to pay for his daughter's wedding is extorted by a loan shark into engineering a robbery at his workplace. Fearful for his life, he confides in Blaketon, who must choose between ruining the family or protecting the man's life. Meanwhile, David causes trouble when he takes up photography and catches the villagers in compromising positions.
253	5	"Hunter's Moon"	Jonas Grimas	Candy Denman	3 October 2004	9.21
Merton works alongside the CID to investigate the death of a fox hunter, but Rob thinks it is a straightforward case when he finds evidence implicating a local poacher. Meanwhile, David neglects to convey a taxi licensing official, and Vernon attempts to win her favour by recreating her favourite dance at the village fête. In Bernie's absence, Vernon asserts his authority by employing a young girl at the garage who creates an impression.
254	6	"Wrecked"	Roger Bamford	Neil McKay	10 October 2004	8.74
After he begins a new romance with a lonely single mother, Bellamy is targeted in a series of attacks which bring up painful memories. Rob begins to suspect an ex-convict whom Bellamy had put behind bars is responsible. Lord Ashfordly demands answers from Merton when his greenhouse is stolen, and his day worsens with the arrival of two irritating Australians who claim to be distant relatives. Bernie receives a shock when he returns to find Rosie working at the garage, but is soon won over by her talents and bubbly personality.
255	7	"Say It with Flowers"	Adrian Bean	Brian Finch	17 October 2004	9.68
Rob and Merton investigate a security van raid and are convinced that there is a link to a recent robbery at a local airfield, but a visiting senior officer dismisses their theory. Meanwhile, Vernon takes a sudden interest in the flower show when he discovers David might be the owner of a rare, potentially prize-winning fuchsia, and turns to Blaketon and Ventress for help when the plant suddenly disappears.
256	8	"Precious Stones"	Andrew Morgan	John Flanagan	31 October 2004	8.92
David becomes a local hero for intervening in an armed robbery at a dinner party, and his newfound celebrity status affects his work. Bellamy and Shiner find the stolen items in a crashed car, concluding that the robbers were amateurs. However, they soon reconsider when the police station is subsequently raided for the stolen jewels. Meanwhile, Ben Norton asks Liz to marry him and move to Kenya. Jenny is aghast at the thought of losing her best friend, leaving the village doctor with a difficult choice.
257	9	"Buried Secrets"	Roger Bamford	Peter Gibbs	7 November 2004	9.32
The team investigate the murder of an ex-army recluse and archaeological enthusiast which may involve a building dispute. His estranged wife and her lover arrive looking for money. Meanwhile, Vernon attempts to enliven his young relative Gareth by matchmaking him with Rosie, disastrously. Vernon sets Gareth's sights elsewhere but leaves David convinced that he has a chance with Rosie, resulting in a rivalry of suitors. Jenny's erratic behaviour leaves Merton worried.
258	10	"Stormy Weather"	Judith Dine	Susan Wilkins	14 November 2004	9.54
As a thunderstorm strikes Aidensfield, Merton and Bellamy investigate the murder of a retired policeman who was about to flee to Spain with his sister-in-law. Jenny behaves oddly after experiencing the strain of being a policeman's spouse. Meanwhile, Vernon believes he has a talent for poker but loses Greengrass's old truck when he challenges Rosie's uncle, who is a professional hustler. When a rematch places the garage in jeopardy, Rosie recruits an eccentric relative to teach her uncle a lesson.
259	11	"Who's Sorry Now?"	Gerry Mill	Candy Denman	21 November 2004	9.87
New doctor Helen Trent arrives with her wealthy husband Matt, whilst Liz plans her wedding to Ben and their departure for Kenya. The changes have Jenny's thoughts spiralling out of control. Merton is desperate to help, but finds himself under suspicion of spousal abuse. Helen finds it difficult to adjust to the slow pace of Yorkshire, and problems in her marriage are revealed.
260	12	"In Sickness and in Health"	Roger Bamford	John Flanagan	28 November 2004	10.24
Vernon's efforts to create an impressive celebration for Liz and Ben's wedding results in chaos when Ben assists the police during the kidnapping of a banker's wife. When the extent of Jenny's mental issues becomes clear, Merton must choose between his wife or his career. Helen's dreams of a fresh start for her marriage look set to be shattered, and Bellamy is happily promoted to acting sergeant in Merton's absence. [Final appearance of Sgt Dennis Merton]
261	13	"In the Bleak Midwinter"	Gerry Mill	Johnny Byrne	26 December 2004	5.95
An ageing jazz band travel to Aidensfield to perform at a Christmas concert and find themselves left with a newborn baby after giving a ride to a teenage hitchhiker. Rob must bring two estranged families together for Christmas. Meanwhile, Gina takes centre stage at the concert with her rendition of "Winter Wonderland", whilst a mix-up leaves both Blaketon and David taking on the role of Father Christmas.
262	14	"Blast from the Past"	Noreen Kershaw	Jane Hollowood	13 March 2005	8.41
Rob undertakes an investigation into a series of violent burglaries against elderly residents, delving into the lives of his father's associates. Rob finds evidence that could convict a major underworld figure but would also implicate his father. Meanwhile, David falls for Matt's mistress and becomes a messenger in their sordid affair, leaving Gina, Bernie and Rosie suspicious of his behaviour. New constable Geoff Younger arrives, to the delight of Sgt Nokes. [First appearance of PC Geoff Younger]
263	15	"Icon"	Judith Dine	Tracy Brabin	20 March 2005	8.52
Ventress goes undercover when Bellamy and Rob hunt for stolen Russian icons smuggled with a fishing boat and suspect an assault victim with criminal connections might be involved. Meanwhile, Vernon embarks on a scheme for Alfred to find truffles. Helen is puzzled by a young girl's baffling medical history, leading to a case of child abuse.
264	16	"Golf Papa One Zero"	Gerry Mill	Candy Denman	27 March 2005	8.21
Blaketon rallies a protest against new Ashfordly Sgt George Miller, who closes the police house in Aidensfield and introduces a state-of-the-art Ford Zephyr police car that fails to perform. Rob is left in serious danger when apprehending robbers without backup. Meanwhile, David gets into trouble when he promises to throw a birthday party for a lonely old lady whose 100th birthday goes unremarked, and nurse Clare Owen takes a shine to hospitalised Rob. [First appearance of Sgt George Miller]
265	17	"The Long View"	Dominic Clemence	John Flanagan	3 April 2005	9.01
Miller is unimpressed by Rob's rebellious streak when he spectacularly bends the rules whilst trying to prevent a highly professional robbery. Meanwhile, Bernie's odd behaviour leaves his nearest and dearest fearing the worst. Gina gives Rosie a makeover ahead of her date, and shows signs of jealousy when Rosie's mystery man is revealed as Phil Bellamy.
266	18	"A Wolf in Sheep's Clothing"	Noreen Kershaw	Peter Gibbs	10 April 2005	9.03
Bellamy tries to impress Miller by single-handedly investigating a marketeer suspected of using sheep to conceal criminal activities. The arrival of a tax inspector throws residents into a panic. Vernon bears the brunt of the taxman's wrath when countless dodgy deals come back to haunt him, and resorts to drastic measures to deal with his debts. Elsewhere, Gina loses patience with Blaketon when he interferes in another of her romances.
267	19	"Friends and Relations"	Noreen Kershaw	Susan Wilkins	17 April 2005	9.57
Rob's girlfriend Clare falls under suspicion when there is a drug-related death at a wild party, and Miller's opinion of Rob falls further when he learns that Rob was at the event. David is taken advantage of by his Aunt Peggy, who moves in and sets up a vodka still. Familiar with Peggy, Ventress informs Blaketon and Gina of her dubious past.
268	20	"Off the Rails"	Roger Bamford	Richard Monks	24 April 2005	9.32
A crime wave hits Ashfordly railway station where a number of freight wagons mysteriously disappear. Miller and his men find a vital clue in an unlikely place. Meanwhile, Peggy plays dirty when Bernie competes in the local bowls tournament. A love triangle begins when Helen and Gina run into Bellamy and Rob on a night out.
269	21	"Rustlers and Hustlers"	Anna Rose	Brian Finch	1 May 2005	8.07
Rob investigates a series of animal thefts when he is called to the scene of a horse-riding accident. Peggy takes advantage of Blaketon's absence for a golf trip by hosting a poker tournament at the pub, but he returns early and bars her and David. Jowett irritates the officers by complaining about bad smells and noisy lorries. Following their night of passion, Helen tells Rob they need to cool it because she does not want him to get involved in her divorce proceedings.
270	22	"Duty of Care"	Ian Bevitt	Ming Ho	8 May 2005	8.73
With Rob absent from police work all week, Bellamy investigates the shooting of a young boy at Ashfordly Hall and accuses the new estate manager of employing child labour. He later uncovers a complicated situation, and is reminded of his past as he tries to help a desperate father conceal a devastating secret from his son. Meanwhile, Peggy's guided tour venture is cut short by a terrifying encounter.
271	23	"Shadows from The Past"	Gerry Mills	Peter Gibbs	15 May 2005	8.68
The Ashfordly team reopen an eleven-year-old unsolved case when a compulsive liar with mental health issues confesses to the murder of a young girl. However, a search for the victim's body uncovers a male skeleton. Rob and Helen try to protect the suspect and his mother from a campaign of abuse. Meanwhile, Peggy sets her sight on a boorish widower, providing amusement for Gina but not for a close friend of the man.
272	24	"Every Dog His Day"	Andrew Morgan	Susan Wilkins	22 May 2005	8.38
Lord Ashfordly hosts a group of young offenders as part of a rehabilitation programme led by an old army friend, but a series of disturbances suggest they are not committed to reforming. Meanwhile, Blaketon and Ventress search for a lonely old woman's beloved dog, and Peggy tries to pass off a lookalike for a reward. Bellamy brings a little happiness into a troubled boy's life.
273	25	"Services Rendered"	Stuart Davids	Johnny Byrne	29 May 2005	7.81
The team have a host of vengeful suspects when a widowed father trying to rebuild his shattered life becomes the target of a hit-and-run accident. Meanwhile, Peggy's illegal cigarettes cause trouble for Younger due to an unexpected ingredient. When the real owners show up, Ventress devises a plan to save them both.
274	26	"Bin Man"	Judith Dine	Jane Hollowood	5 June 2005	8.72
Gina finds a severed hand in her dustbin, and the team search for other body parts and find evidence implicating a close ally of Lord Ashfordly for murder. Meanwhile, Peggy invests in a freezer to sell rabbits and pheasants and is caught in a murder enquiry. Elsewhere, Blaketon befriends a private investigator hired to obtain compromising information on Helen for use in her divorce. Bernie is unnerved when things disappear at the garage.

=== Arrivals ===
- PC Rob Walker – ("Money, Money, Money", Episode 1)
- PC Geoff Younger – ("Blast from the Past", Episode 14)
- Sgt George Miller – ("Golf Papa Zero", Episode 16)

=== Departures ===
- Sgt Dennis Merton – Resigns and retires to have more time with his family and wife, after Jenny has been sent to a mental hospital ("In Sickness and in Health", Episode 12)

=== Series 15 (2005–2006) ===
No. overall	No. in series	Title	Directed by	Written by	Original release date	UK viewers (millions)
275	1	"A Fresh Start"	Roger Bamford	John Flanagan & Andrew McCulloch	11 September 2005	6.93
A reformed London gangster rescues Rob from a beating by a gang of car thieves and subsequently finds himself under Miller's scrutiny. Younger makes a grave error that could have far-reaching consequences, Peggy's chicken feed scheme causes a salmonella outbreak, while Helen and Rob begin a full-blown affair and Ventress is concerned for his wife's health.
276	2	"The Devil You Know"	Andrew Morgan	Peter Gibbs	2 October 2005	8.42
Ventress goes undercover to investigate a dangerous driver who accused Rob of using excessive force, but the operation casts doubt on Miller's integrity. Lord Ashfordly asks Gina to help him select a new housekeeper, with Peggy applying for the job. Elsewhere, one of David's elderly customers gives him her late husband's model railway set. Bellamy is appointed Police Federation rep and addresses Younger's complaint of being treated like an odd-job man rather than a copper. Peggy surprises everyone in a clay pigeon shooting competition.
277	3	"Miller's Tale"	Judith Dine	Richard Monks	9 October 2005	8.05
Miller chases a gang of night poachers on Ashfordly estate and accidentally knocks down an elderly tramp, who later dies in hospital, jeopardising Miller's career. Meanwhile, Peggy is knocked down a hole during the poaching chase and schemes to sue for imagined injuries. Elsewhere, Gina becomes attracted to and falls in love with art college teacher Jack Hollins. Blaketon is tempted to sell the pub to the brewery.
278	4	"Mastermind"	Jonas Grimas	Brian Finch	16 October 2005	8.69
A gang of ageing villains attempt a glorious crime spree when the villagers leave Aidensfield en masse to support Rob in a police charity football match. David is nervous when summoned for jury service; the accused is an old acquaintance of Peggy's, providing her with an opportunity to make money and leaving David paranoid that Miller wants him arrested.
279	5	"Family Ties"	Jonas Grimas	Candy Denman	23 October 2005	8.12
With Phil absent from police work all week, Helen is suspected of euthanasia when one of her patients suddenly dies, and Rob's desperate need to clear her name nearly exposes their affair. Meanwhile, Peggy and David start a strawberry scam involving Rosie's two brothers, providing Younger with his first independent investigation.
280	6	"The End of the Road"	Roger Bamford	Jane Hollowood	30 October 2005	8.94
An escaped killer causes a public outcry when he commits a series of violent attacks in Aidensfield; the targets include his parents. When Helen is kidnapped, Rob's feelings jeopardise the capture of the fugitive. Meanwhile, David faces a heartbreaking time when Alfred dies; Peggy, Bernie and Rosie try to bring light back into his life.
281	7	"Picture This"	Andrew Morgan	Susan Wilkins	6 November 2005	9.08
Miller demands answers from Lord Ashfordly when a priceless Manet painting is stolen from the home of a retired German art dealer, who suffers critical injuries in a car accident. Meanwhile, Peggy tries to convince a pair of visiting birdwatchers that Aidensfield's wildlife includes a rare bird of prey, and David poses as an ornithological expert.
282	8	"The Good Samaritan"	Judith Dine	Collin MacDonald	13 November 2005	8.58
Residents raise money for a devout couple whose baby requires a live-saving operation in America. With Miller absent from police work all week, PC Rob Walker, PC Geoff Younger and acting Sgt. Phil Bellamy investigate when greed and a brotherly feud result in a series of assaults and a fatal car crash. Meanwhile, Peggy frightens some holidaymakers when a rumour circulates that a local tourist spot is haunted, and Jack and Gina come across a dead body in the woods.
283	9	"Blood Brothers"	Gerry Mill	Peter Gibbs	20 November 2005	9.22
David helps a friend escape the return of a troublesome father, but inadvertently leaves the young boy with a paedophile. Meanwhile, Jack recruits Bernie in an ill-advised attempt to encourage Gina's creative ambitions when the pub hosts an art exhibition. Lord Ashfordly hires Peggy as a dog trainer after his hound bites a window cleaner, who demands the police have the animal put to sleep.
284	10	"Burden Of Proof"	Roger Bamford	Susan Wilkins	27 November 2005	9.22
A woman hires Blaketon to spy on her adulterous husband, who is subsequently found dead. The woman claims that Blaketon is her lover, making him the prime suspect, and Rob works to clear the detective's name. Meanwhile, Phil falls in love with Debbie Black, a young woman with three children, when he attends to a burglary at her house. Peggy buys a racing greyhound that refuses to run. [First appearance of Debbie Bellamy]
285	11	"O Guilty Man!"	Judith Dine	Jane Hollowood	4 December 2005	8.87
A truck Bernie recently repaired crashes into a garden, causing his sanity to be questioned by an opportunistic journalist. David fears the worst when Bernie disappears, and Blaketon and Ventress initiate a search. Meanwhile, Helen's husband Matthew returns, with a plot that could have Rob transferred away, but Helen plays her husband at his own games.
286	12	"Auld Acquaintance"	Roger Bamford	Peter Gibbs	18 December 2005	8.70
Lord Ashfordly goes on holiday to Bermuda over Christmas, leaving Ashfordly Hall under the watch of an old army pal. He harbours a young hooligan who attempts to steal valuables, and the man tries to impart a valuable life lesson in a violent way. Meanwhile, Blaketon and Peggy create competing Santa's Grottos. Ventress is upset when his wife falls ill, and Gina, Helen, David and Phil draw lots on who gets to host him for Christmas dinner.
287	13	"Living with the Past (Phil Bellamy's & Debbie Black's wedding)"	Jonas Grimas	John Flanagan	1 January 2006	7.94
The villagers are furious at the release of ex-convict Henry Stoddard, who is immediately suspected when the pub is attacked and Ventress is nearly killed in a hit-and-run. Stoddard claims innocence in this and the 15-year-old murder for which he was convicted. Rob reopens the case and tarnishes Blaketon's integrity when evidence suggests another member of the Stoddard family was responsible. Meanwhile, Peggy learns that she may be a distant relative of Lord Ashfordly's and makes herself at home at Ashfordly Hall. Bellamy leaves the villagers amazed when he arrives at the pub with his new wife, Debbie.
288	14	"Risky Business"	Gerry Mill	Peter Gibbs	8 January 2006	8.49
A young arsonist's rehabilitation is threatened when he is accused of a series of arson attacks, complicated by his clandestine relationship with a former employer's daughter. Rob is reminded of his own troublesome childhood and tries to prove the youngster's innocence, but all evidence points to the contrary. Meanwhile, Blaketon and Jack join in opposition of Peggy's advertisement venture, ending up in a police cell. Gina is still showing jealousy at Debbie and Phil's romance.
289	15	"Hostage to Fortune"	Andrew Morgan	John Flanagan	15 January 2006	9.02
The Ashfordly team pursue Aidensfield's version of armed robbers Bonnie and Clyde. When the runaway heiress is injured on the run, her ruthless boyfriend kidnaps Helen, who provokes the pair by advising her patient to end the partnership. Meanwhile, Peggy is incensed when Rosie manages the garage in Bernie's absence, and instructs David to organise a funeral in a madcap scheme to have Bernie leave the garage to David in his will.
290	16	"Judgement Day"	Roger Bamford	Brian Finch	22 January 2006	9.66
Rob and the team are called when a local judge is targeted in a series of attacks and subsequently blackmailed over his sordid personal life. The case takes a sinister twist when the prime suspect is shot dead on his doorstep. Meanwhile, Peggy and David buy a police radio and sell information to the Ashfordly Gazette, teaching a pompous old enemy a lesson in the process. Miller soon discovers their scheme and delights at the opportunity to charge Peggy.
291	17	"Get Back"	Adrian Bean	Mark Holloway	23 April 2006	9.12
A man claims to be a local farmer who had suffered amnesia during a London air raid in the 1940s and was presumed dead. He tries to resume his life, though his wife has married an ill and abusive man, who seems to know more about the circumstances of his rival's disappearance. Meanwhile, Lord Ashfordly's displays strange behaviour after consuming Peggy's peculiar batch of mushrooms. Younger asks Rosie for driving lessons to prepare for an official police course, and she is horrified when rumours spread of their presumed romance.
292	18	"Runners and Riders"	Adrian Bean	Sarah Begshaw	30 April 2006	8.53
Lord Ashfordly's niece arrives following the collapse of her marriage, and her prize racehorse is stolen for ransom. A biker gang arrives in town, bringing romance for Rosie. Bernie risks alienating Gina when he blames the bikers for a robbery at the church. Bellamy races to save Debbie's daughter Jane from a seedy photographer.
293	19	"Great Expectations"	Gerry Mill	Jane Hollowood	7 May 2006	9.35
A local has to put the family farm up for auction, and is shocked when his estranged brother arrives, desperate to get his hands on a box of old junk. Blaketon and Jack are at risk when they stand in his way of getting it back. Debbie confronts an old flame and gets into trouble for drink driving. David is left stranded with a pompous couple when Peggy buys a horse and carriage for her sightseeing enterprise.
294	20	"Kith and Kin"	Andrew Morgan	Susan Wilkins	14 May 2006	8.37
Bernie is subjected to a series of violent attacks, leaving Rosie concerned when he refuses to involve the police. Rob is provoked by a violent farmer who causes a brawl during his granddaughter's birth. Helen's estranged father tries to make amends before he dies of cancer. Peggy enters David into a fishing competition without his approval.
295	21	"Wine and Roses"	Gerry Mill	John Flanagan	21 May 2006	8.64
Phil is distraught when Debbie goes on a late-night drinking spree by the river, and she becomes implicated in the murder of a bank manager. Meanwhile, Jowett takes action when Peggy and David allow a colony of hippies to stay on their land, and Younger finds himself caught between two strong-minded women who come to blows. Helen and Rob patch things up after their breakup.
296	22	"This Happy Breed"	Jonas Grimas	John Flanagan	28 May 2006	8.06
Miller's old army captain offers him a business proposition, which he declines without regret. However, a series of car thefts suggest that the old friend has other business in Aidensfield. Meanwhile, Bellamy struggles to care for Debbie's children whilst she is in rehab; Peggy takes his two stepdaughters on a day out and they are arrested for poaching. Jack encourages Gina to pose nude for a painting.
297	23	"Keeping Secrets (Rob Walker's & Helen Trent's wedding)"	Roger Bamford	Jane Hollowood	4 June 2006	8.11
Despite Rob's efforts to keep his wedding secret, his enigmatic sisters and Gina enlist the help of the residents to organise a big surprise party. The day is upset when Helen's mother voices disapproval and a noise complaint turns deadly when a mentally ill woman takes matters into her own hands. Meanwhile, Debbie returns from rehab a changed woman, Younger's dancing is found lacking, Peggy uses old Christmas decorations for the wedding reception, and Miller gains an admirer. Gina discovers that Jack has sold the nude painting of her to a London gallery and wants them to move away.
298	24	"The Dying of the Light"	Adrian Bean	Jonathan Critchely	18 June 2006	6.82
Rob suspects a connection when a car is found crashed in a ditch and a farm suffers a series of sheep rustling incidents. Helen must settle affairs when a woman suffering from dementia wanders away from home and is later found dead in the river. Meanwhile, Peggy is intrigued by an eco-warrior couple's slurry-fuelled generator. Blaketon grows concerned for Gina when she becomes withdrawn after breaking up with Jack.
299	25	"Bad Company"	Gerry Mill	Peter Gibbs	2 July 2006	7.32
A hit-and-run following a local dance leads to the son of the councillor on the police committee, who is known for his reckless driving. The case puts Younger in a compromising position. Meanwhile, an exasperated David leaves Peggy to run the taxi business whilst he becomes a window cleaner's assistant.
300	26	"Accidents Happen"	Jonas Grimas	John Flanagan & Andrew McCulloch	2 July 2006	6.84
A prisoner is broken out of the Ashfordly station cells to pilot a helicopter for an armed robbery. Bellamy faces heartbreak when Debbie begins acting strangely as a familiar face returns to the village. Helen moves into the police house with Rob, but their happiness is brief as a disturbed boy takes violent revenge for the death of his dog during a car chase involving the police. Meanwhile, a dentist shows romantic interest in Peggy, but she discovers his ulterior motive and recruits a struggling journalist to exact revenge. [Final appearance of Debbie Bellamy]

=== Series 16 (2006–2007) ===
No. overall	No. in series	Title	Directed by	Written by	Original release date	UK viewers (millions)
301	1	"C'est La Vie"	Roger Bamford	Peter Gibbs	29 October 2006	8.68
Rob returns from mourning his wife and saves a conman whose car crashes into the river, prompting him to confess to a life of crime. Blaketon is excited as a Frenchwoman arrives for preparations to "twin" Aidensfield with her hometown, but becomes jealous when Lord Ashfordly takes a shine to her. Left to the tender mercies of Peggy and David, she finds herself behind bars. Bellamy recuperates from his wife's departure, whilst new district nurse Carol Cassidy struggles to treat a woman with an over-protective husband.
302	2	"Old Scores"	Jonas Grimas	Peter Gibbs	5 November 2006	9.30
A convicted rapist is targeted by a hate campaign when he returns to Aidensfield, as his victim committed suicide. When a serious allegation is made, Rob's investigation reunites him with CID Detective Sergeant Rachel Dawson, an old flame. Dawson and Younger recapture an escaped convict. Meanwhile, Peggy, David and Carol try to help a talented singer overcome alcoholism. [First appearance of DS Rachel Dawson]
303	3	"Intelligence Matters"	Gerry Mill	John Flanagan	12 November 2006	9.63
The Ashfordly team joins forces with Dawson and a shady MI5 agent in the hunt for a suspected Soviet spy, but Carol soon discovers the agent has secrets of his own after witnessing a standoff at a railway station. Meanwhile, Peggy fancies herself as the next Miss Marple when an old note among a dead friend's belongings raises questions about her cheating husband's disappearance. Miller suffers from a toothache.
304	4	"Please, Please Me"	Andrew Morgan	Jane Hollowood	19 November 2006	9.42
Rosie is troubled by an ex-boyfriend whose attentions escalate to stalking. Rob and Carol learn the man has a history of violence against his ex-girlfriends, and Younger shows a darker side when he protects his friend. A series of car thefts and dog disappearances, including Peggy's car with David's dog, leave Miller and his men baffled. Gina encourages Bellamy to talk about his feelings, and the full extent of his heartache spills out when she accidentally suggests they give their relationship another chance.
305	5	"Memoirs of a Fighting Man"	Roger Bamford	John Martin Johnson	26 November 2006	9.44
Rob clashes with Blaketon while deciding whether to charge an ex-army major who fatally shot a young burglar. Meanwhile, a struggling father asks for Carol's help dealing with his pregnant teenage daughter who has withdrawn from the world. Peggy, Rosie and David try to save the garage with a modern makeover, incurring Bernie's wrath.
306	6	"Pretty Woman"	Jonas Grimas	Mark Holloway	3 December 2006	8.76
Rob and Rosie try to protect a Miss Yorkshire beauty contestant who is targeted by mysterious attacks. Large numbers of female protesters picket the event, but Rob learns that the threat is closer to home. Miller is unimpressed when Younger's bicycle is stolen and orders him to make more arrests. With advice from Ventress, Younger finds a novel way of raising the village crime rate. Bellamy gets closer to Gina when she is injured in an explosion. Peggy places a wager for a friend who dies before he can collect his winnings.
307	7	"Stumped"	Roger Bamford	Adrian Bean	10 December 2006	8.15
A failed sting operation leaves three armed robbers on the run, one in a cell and an informant fearing for his life. Rob is taken hostage, leaving Miller, Dawson and Bellamy against a tough deadline. Meanwhile, Blaketon is determined to win the annual cricket match against Scarsdale, but assembling a team proves hectic when Ventress calls off and Bernie struggles to grasp the sport. Rosie is incensed when Blaketon refuses to allow her on to the team, despite her talent, whilst David becomes the team's secret weapon and a target of sabotage. Features a guest appearance from Dickie Bird as the match umpire.
308	8	"Little White Lies"	Gerry Mill	Peter Gibbs	17 December 2006	8.39
The team search for a young boy who disappears after discovering his mother is having an affair with a family friend, who is later seriously injured in a road accident. Meanwhile, Younger fills in for the lollipop lady and starts a friendship with a bullied boy. Gina and Bellamy arrange for Rob to date a hairdresser, but he realises he still is not over the loss of Helen. Miller is outraged when a nits infestation grips the Ashfordly station. Carol is delighted when her fiancé visits her on leave from the Navy, whilst Peggy and David experience a slight cash-flow problem.
309	9	"Hearts and Flowers"	Andrew Morgan	Susan Wilkins	24 December 2006	6.32
Chaos reigns when a sniper kills Jowett's sister as she leaves the pub. Dawson and Rob's enquiries reveal the gunman may have missed his intended target, which Blaketon realises may be Jowett or himself, and the two are brought closer together. Meanwhile, Peggy buys an ice cream van to take advantage of the hot weather and leaves David in charge of the venture whilst she attends a Redcoat reunion, but his home recipes have interesting results.
310	10	"Give Peace a Chance"	Jonas Grimas	Jane Hollowood	31 December 2006	5.68
While called to subdue anti-war protesters at an airfield, Rob is accused of police brutality. Miller finds the complainant is the boyfriend of his estranged daughter Jo, who he has to arrest. Meanwhile, Younger is devastated when Rosie begins a romance with new vet Fergus, who causes chaos at the garage when a snake escapes from his car. Irritated that nobody takes her snake catching suggestions seriously, Peggy leaves with David and inadvertently heads into danger.
311	11	"Dead Men Do Tell Tales"	Judith Dine	Brian Finch	31 December 2006	6.03
Three young joyriders steal Carol's car, taking some of the drugs in her medical bag and selling the rest. One of the joyrider's parents so happens to be a solicitor and she tries to wreck Carol's reputation to protect her son. Meanwhile, David agrees to store a coffin for a Swedish sailor, but he and Peggy suspect it may contain something other than a body. Elsewhere, Rosie and Fergus suffer a series of interruptions on their dates, while Bellamy wonders whether rekindling his relationship with Gina is a good idea.
312	12	"Vendetta"	Andrew Morgan	Peter Gibbs	7 January 2007	8.60
Blaketon offers to help a woman find her missing son, but becomes targeted by a mysterious assailant on a boundless vendetta. Meanwhile, David's plan to throw Peggy a birthday party are rejected so that she can date an old flame who reappears after twenty years. Younger finally gets his driving licence. Gina asks Rob to look into Bellamy's behaviour, leading to a shocking admission. Bellamy collapses whilst making an arrest.
313	13	"Sleeping Dogs"	Jonas Grimas	John Flanagan	6 May 2007	7.89
Bernie inherits a fortune from his sister, which draws out his half-brother Vernon, who had faked his suicide two years earlier to avoid a taxman. Peggy panics when Vernon asks David to accompany him to Spain. However, both Bernie and Vernon are detained on suspicion of murder. Meanwhile, Rob and Carol deal with a religious man who reacts harshly to his 16-year-old daughter's pregnancy. Bellamy who collapsed whilst making an arrest, and has been admitted to Ashfordly General fears his family's history of heart failure has caught up to him. Though he does not want Gina to know, she finds out and spontaneously declares her feelings for him.
314	14	"Another Little Piece of My Heart"	Roger Bamford	Susan Wilkins	13 May 2007	8.53
Rosie, Carol, Rob and Lord Ashfordly make a stand against an arrogant aristocrat who shoots a dog and is suspected of abusing his wife, who has an infant child. Meanwhile, Younger is led on a wild goose chase by a group of wayward children who release livestock from the local farms. Blaketon is angry when Gina and Bellamy announce their third engagement. [When this episode is broadcast, it is preceded by a viewer discretion warning, due to the depiction of domestic violence.]
315	15	"Seeds of Destruction"	Judith Dine	Jonathan Critchely	20 May 2007	8.10
A retired major dies in police custody after Younger gives him painkillers for back trouble, and Carol learns that a freelance herbalist is treating some of her patients. Meanwhile, a BBC documentarian arrives to record village life and is driven mad by the excited residents, especially Peggy, who tries to provide "the full Yorkshire experience". Gina proves she is serious about marrying Bellamy by signing over the licence of the pub to Blaketon.
316	16	"No Laughing Matter"	Adrian Bean	John Flanagan	27 May 2007	8.05
Suspicion falls on Gina's new cellarman when a valuable pendant is stolen from a guest. A search into the barman's past reveals a history of crime, but Emily appears more disturbed by the presence of a pub comedian. Meanwhile, Younger seeks to buy a car but soon regrets asking Peggy to help him purchase a cheap vehicle. Love re-blossoms again for Gina and Bellamy as they plan their honeymoon.
317	17	"Out of Africa"	Andrew Morgan	Peter Gibbs	3 June 2007	7.07
Rob is called out to investigate a series of vandalisms against Lord Ashfordly's new estate manager who angered the tenants with hardline methods learned in South Africa. Meanwhile, Peggy believes she has found the explanation for David's recent behaviour when she uncovers his strange new addiction.
318	18	"The Dreams That You Dream (Phil Bellamy's & Gina Ward's wedding)"	Roger Bamford	Jane Hollowood	24 June 2007	7.84
Gina and Bellamy finish the preparations for their wedding and are loaned the use of Ashfordly Hall. The groom's uneventful stag night stirs pre-wedding nerves, especially when Gina's old flame Jack returns. Rob and Peggy prepare an extravagant surprise for the soon-to-be-married couple. The rest of Ashfordly station look into the disappearance of an elderly resident who had put his cottage up for sale.
319	19	"Mind Games"	Gerry Mill	Andrew McCulloch	1 July 2007	5.63
Rosie is viciously attacked while attending a broken down vehicle on the moors, with the murdered driver discovered nearby. Rob and Dawson learn that the driver was a retired cop turned private detective, and their investigation leads to a religious cult. Meanwhile, Peggy buys a flock of turkeys from an old friend, but David grows attached. Carol is not happy when Rob cancels their first date.
320	20	"The Medium Is the Message"	Adrian Bean	Mark Holloway	8 July 2007	7.28
When a reverend's wife is murdered a psychic convention in Ashfordly seems to hold the key to solving the case, whilst Dawson becomes suspicious of the reverend's alibi. Bellamy arrests a drunken tramp who is revealed to be Younger's father. Meanwhile, Peggy plans to sell trout to a hotel in Scarborough but lands David and herself in trouble with Miller when it is discovered how she acquired them.
321	21	"One Small Step"	Gerry Mill	Shaun McKenna	15 July 2007	7.34
Phil Bellamy, George Miller and Geoff Younger's lives are at risk when the Ashfordly Police Station is attacked by a professional gang set on freeing two of their members. At the Aidensfield Arms, Rob Walker, Rachel Dawson and Alf Ventress gather with others to watch the moon landing, but Blaketon and Peggy get into a debate when Peggy becomes convinced that the whole event has been faked and sets out to prove it. One guest at the pub gives Gina and Bernie cause for concern when she appears unusually agitated by the historic event.
322	22	"Troubled Waters"	Roger Bamford	Susan Wilkins	22 July 2007	6.99
Carol is consumed by guilt and regret when a newborn baby dies in her care, provoking the father to return to his criminal ways after a run-in with Rob and Blaketon at the pub. Meanwhile, Peggy hatches a plan to rescue Bernie when he becomes the object of a predatory widow's affections.
323	23	"Where There's Smoke"	Adrian Bean	Peter Gibbs	29 July 2007	6.88
Undercover surveillance is conducted on an illegal gaming club, whose criminal operator has accumulated enemies that complicate his plans to sail away with his mistress. Rob awaits the results of his sergeant's exam and finds himself caught in a love triangle with Carol and Dawson. Inspired by a magazine story about Hugh Hefner and Peggy's complaints about the music he likes, David sets up a party den and invites Rosie and a friend of hers, which incurs Peggy's disapproval, but David then finds himself unwelcome at his own party.
324	24	"Laying the Ghost"	Judith Dine	Jane Hollowood	5 August 2007	7.23
A new resident becomes the object of rumours due to her unlikeable and secretive personality. Jowett discovers the woman is harbouring a secret companion. Peggy is put in charge of the jumble sale for the upcoming village fête. Rob is offered a place on a course away from Aidensfield, but cannot decide whether or not to leave his colleagues and Carol. [Final appearance of PC Rob Walker]

=== Arrivals ===
- DS Rachel Dawson – ("Old Scores", Episode 2)

=== Departures ===
- PC Rob Walker – promoted to Sergeant and transfers to the Kidnap Squad at Scotland Yard. ("Laying the Ghost", Episode 24)

=== Series 17 (2007–2008) ===
No. overall	No. in series	Title	Directed by	Written by	Original release date	UK viewers (millions)
325	1	"Stop Gap"	Roger Bamford	John Flanagan	11 November 2007	8.41
New village bobby Joe Mason apprehends three armed hostage takers at the church and impresses Blaketon with his tactics against a local troublemaker. However, Joe alienates villagers and colleagues with his cocky attitude until put straight by Ventress and Carol. Dawson, Bellamy and Younger pursue a professional Manchester gang who are targeting country houses. Meanwhile, Peggy trespasses on the Ashfordly Estate, but neither she nor Lord Ashfordly are a match for Joe. [First appearance of PC Joe Mason]
326	2	"Heirs Apparent"	Gerry Mill	Peter Gibbs	18 November 2007	7.98
Joe finds there is more to his job when called to help deliver a baby. He arrests Lord Ashfordly on suspicion of attacking a teenage girl who claimed to be Ashfordly's illegitimate daughter, and Miller is unimpressed by Joe's handling of the sensitive case. Meanwhile, David decides to make a will, but a series of accidents raise paranoia that one of his beneficiaries may be trying to kill him.
327	3	"Night Mail"	Adrian Bean	Susan Wilkins	25 November 2007	7.83
Armed robbers hold up a train, and Joe interferes with a CID investigation led by an old adversary. The constabulary are exasperated with him, but Joe finds an ally in Dawson who discovers trouble within the CID. Meanwhile, Peggy receives an inheritance from a distant relative of her late husband.
328	4	"Love Story"	Judith Dine	Jane Hollowood	2 December 2007	7.84
Three Australian sheepshearers are celebrated for helping a local farm but upset a bully, who frames one for theft. Joe and Carol try to protect the farmer's daughter, who is being terrorised by her brother. Rosie has to choose between the Australians and a past lover. Meanwhile, Peggy starts a laundry service with David doing the work. Bellamy is displeased when he discovers Gina has been taking contraceptives. Joe is saddened when Miller tells him that he is being replaced.
329	5	"Another Sleepy, Dusty, Delta Day"	Gerry Mill	Mark Holloway	16 December 2007	8.10
The death of a young man and subsequent disappearance of his son is linked to the disappearance of a baby three years earlier, suggesting the baby's broken parents may be responsible. Following Rosie's departure, Bernie's spirits are lifted when he makes a large amount of money selling an inherited Rolls-Royce. Miller's worst nightmare comes true when it becomes apparent that there are two Peggy Armstrongs.
330	6	"Touch and Go"	Roger Bamford	Shaun McKenna	23 December 2007	7.60
With the arrival of Rob's permanent replacement, Don Wetherby, Joe seems to have no choice but to take his new post in London. Carol notices bruising on a boy's arm and suspects abuse by his stepfather, just as his biological father returns. A violent custody dispute catches Joe, Bellamy and Wetherby in the crossfire leading to Bellamy being shot dead. Meanwhile, Gina and Blaketon organise a charity quiz night on Lord Ashfordly's urging, but Peggy's competitive streak gets the better of her. [Final appearance of PC Phil Bellamy and first appearance of PC Don Weatherby]
331	7	"Burying The Past"	Adrian Bean	Andrew McCulloch	30 December 2007	6.93
The villagers prepare for Phil Bellamy's funeral. Gina struggles to cope and considers returning to Liverpool. The whole of Aidensfield say their farewells to the much-loved bobby, with Blaketon paying a tribute to his former PC. At Ashfordly station, Joe and Dawson investigate the suspected suicide of a local teacher. Don Wetherby is racked with guilt and decides to leave until Miller offers a proposition. Meanwhile, Carol fails to report an elderly motorist involved in a hit-and-run with a cyclist, who turns out to be Dr. Chris Oakley. David is worried when Peggy takes Bellamy's death particularly badly and vanishes.
332	8	"Only Make Believe"	Judith Dine	Peter Gibbs	6 January 2008	8.51
Wetherby is followed to Aidensfield by a deranged stalker who ruined his marriage. He asks Joe for help when she makes a serious accusation against him. Meanwhile, Bernie's dating weekend with a widow coincides with Ventress and Blaketon's private investigation into a series of burglaries, when they all arrive at the same hotel. Gina resolves to return to work at the pub after a heart-to-heart with Peggy, and Carol finds herself attracted to Chris.
333	9	"The Devil Rides Out"	Roger Bamford	Susan Wilkins	13 January 2008	7.97
A reverend believes an evil presence is at work when Satanic symbols are found painted on the church and gravestones, though Miller believes hooligans are responsible. An attack on Lord Ashfordly's godson leads Joe and the team into a dangerous world of drugs and rock music. Meanwhile, a psychiatrist attempts to help Gina overcome her grief, but she becomes more stressed upon discovering that she is pregnant.
334	10	"Changing Roles"	Gerry Mill	Andrew McCulloch	23 March 2008	6.39
Miller immediately suspects a disgruntled drink driver of raiding the police station, stealing a patrol car and uniform. However, a new lead becomes apparent when Olive Winstanley jeopardises Dawson's witness protection operation, and Joe gets into trouble while distracted by an old flame. Meanwhile, Peggy becomes Lord Ashfordly's new gamekeeper and impresses with her clear-up rate, but her newfound power alienates David and she puts a poacher in hospital.
335	11	"A Brush with the Law"	Jonas Grimas	John Martin Johnson	30 March 2008	7.15
An unpopular master hunter's den is targeted by arson, and suspects include Lord Ashfordly, a kennelman threatened with dismissal and a farmer whose land was severely damaged. Meanwhile, Blaketon decides to teach Peggy a lesson when she schemes to sue the locals for compensation. Joe is looking to purchase a new car and asks Bernie's advice.
336	12	"The Heart of a Man"	Mark McKillop	Collin MacDonald	6 April 2008	7.13
Cash is stolen from a blind man's home, leading the team to a farmworker's revolt against an unpopular businessman and a shady practice of covering up injuries and unsafe work practices. Carol finds reason to believe the businessman is abusing his teenage daughter. Meanwhile, David becomes the guardian angel for a suicidal naturist who jumps off a bridge, and Peggy tries to make some money from the strange man.
337	13	"Out of the Long, Dark Night"	Andrew Morgan	Stuart Morris	18 May 2008	6.05
Joe and Carol become involved in a revenge plot against a suspected Nazi war criminal when a Jewish couple are plagued by a series of sabotage acts, which later puts Younger's life at risk. Meanwhile, a vintage steam traction engine breaks down outside Bernie's garage, causing chaos in Aidensfield and leaving Bernie and Jowett fuming. Further mayhem arises when David takes it for a test run.
338	14	"Take Three Girls"	Roger Bamford	Peter Gibbs	25 May 2008	5.87
A teacher manipulates his vulnerable girlfriend into committing crimes to promote his activist views. When Joe and Wetherby determine his intentions, he reunites the woman with her estranged father in an elaborate scheme to evade prosecution. Meanwhile, David is unexcited about accompanying a farmer's large daughter to a disco, but becomes her knight in shining armour. Carol and Chris have an argument over how to advise a pregnant teenager.
339	15	"Hey Hey LBJ"	Andrew Morgan	John Flanagan	1 June 2008	5.70
A 17-year-old girl disappears after an argument with her father, and Joe searches for her American boyfriend who is taking extreme measures to prolong his stay in Yorkshire to avoid being drafted into the American Army and sent to Vietnam. Meanwhile, David and Peggy's scheme to find treasure with an old metal detector puts them under suspicion when bronze statues are stolen from local estates.
340	16	"Danse Macabre"	Jonas Grimas	Shaun McKenna	27 July 2008	5.38
An aspiring ballerina collapses and expresses a fear of being taken away, leading Joe and Carol to assume that her demanding elderly guardian is connected. Meanwhile, David is hired to write an advice column for the Ashfordly Gazette, displeasing Peggy who wanted the job. Younger struggles with his feelings for a local shopkeeper's daughter, due to embarrassing bouts of sneezing when he tries to speak to her.
341	17	"Missing Persons"	Adrian Bean	Jane Hollowood	3 August 2008	6.23
Carol, Blaketon and Joe protect two young girls, whose mother has neglected them to revel with her criminal boyfriend. Joe's anger boils over when a social worker does not take the case seriously, leading to explosive consequences. Meanwhile, Gina is distracted from pregnancy anxieties when Phil Bellamy's 18-year-old niece Dawn (daughter of PC Phil Bellamy's brother Peter) comes to stay after getting into trouble in her hometown. Gina's unexpected fury is unleashed on David when Dawn goes missing after he forgets to collect her. Miller is unimpressed when Younger fails to catch thieves who have been stealing lead from churches.
342	18	"Taking Stock"	Ian Bevitt	John Flanagan	10 August 2008	6.25
A crashed car is found to have been used in a Liverpool robbery, suggesting a new group of criminals are loose in the area, and the only lead is a sketch. Blaketon joins Ventress in surveillance of the wife of an old friend, who is convinced that she is having an affair. Gina also goes away, leaving Bernie and Dawn in charge of the pub. Peggy tries to sell Angora goats.
343	19	"The Big Chill"	Jonas Grimas	Susan Wilkins	17 August 2008	6.80
With her sexist superior trying to discredit her, Dawson turns to Joe, Wetherby and Younger for help to catch a drug smuggling gang. Gina starts a friendship with the ringleader's girlfriend at an antenatal class and puts herself in peril when she tries to rescue the woman. Meanwhile, Bernie is pressured to give Jowett's uncle the finest funeral service, and his anxiety increases when Peggy offers a solution for his broken-down hearse.
344	20	"Bully Boys"	Andrew Morgan	Peter Gibbs	24 August 2008	6.71
Younger fails to control a brawl at the bookmakers. On the advice of ex-con debt collector Mick Revill, Younger joins the local gym and enters a boxing match against Wetherby. Meanwhile, Revill is accused of shady dealings by a local businessman and becomes the prime suspect when his wife's thieving ex-husband is run down. David is reluctant to attend a school reunion due to the return of a bully who has become a successful adult, though Peggy insists that he make business connections.
345	21	"It Came from Outer Space"	Adrian Beam	Phillip Palmer	31 August 2008	7.17
Dawson links an explosion in the woods to armed criminals, and Joe goes undercover at a local quarry to infiltrate the gang. Joe tries to save a conflicted man from a life of crime but places himself in danger when his cover is blown. Meanwhile, Peggy exploits a rumour that the explosion was caused by a meteorite when she learns how valuable space debris is.
346	22	"You Never Can Tell"	Judith Dine	Mark Holloway	14 September 2008	5.63
A music manager is found dead the day after holding his wedding reception at the Aidensfield Arms. Blaketon and Dawn uncover a plot involving his bride and her mother, a leukaemia diagnosis, and his memoirs. Meanwhile, Peggy is caught with stolen property, feigns amnesia and is hospitalised. Younger is tipped to a series of upcoming crimes by Wetherby's young son, who disappears.
347	23	"Mixed Messages"	Jonas Grimas	Jane Hollowood	21 September 2008	5.49
Joe tries to help Carol when she is suspected in the death of a pensioner. Peggy takes action when a local magistrate's rubbish is dumped on her doorstep, leading Younger into an embarrassing encounter with the magistrate. Gina's anxiety over her unborn child intensifies when she has a health scare.
348	24	"Oscar's Birthday"	Andrew Morgan	Jane Hollywood	28 September 2008	6.48
Joe becomes a pawn in an attractive gold digger's scheme to escape her overprotective husband with his money. The villagers organise Blaketon's surprise party, and David asks Bernie to teach him how to play the piano before Peggy scraps it. A second celebration comes when Gina goes into labour at the party. Joe and Carol confront their feelings for one another.

=== Arrivals ===
- PC Joe Mason – ("Stop Gap", Episode 1)
- PC Don Weatherby – ("Touch and Go", Episode 6)

=== Departures ===
- PC Phil Bellamy – Shot dead on duty ("Touch and Go", Episode 6)

=== Series 18 (2008–2010) ===
No. overall	No. in series	Title	Directed by	Written by	Original release date	UK viewers (millions)
349	1	"Family Matters"	Gerry Mill	John Flanagan & Andrew McCulloch	12 October 2008	5.74
While Ashfordly police are tasked with protecting a suspected Nazi collaborator who is visiting the area, Sgt Miller begins acting strangely, leading PC Joe to discover that he is being extorted for his cooperation in exchange for his daughter's safety. Meanwhile, Peggy becomes convinced she has a serious illness, which worries David. Gina settles into motherhood and Dawn becomes interested with a mysterious Frenchman visiting the Aidensfield Arms.
350	2	"England Expects"	Jonas Grimas	Shaun McKenna	19 October 2008	6.12
A seriously ill fugitive pursues a vendetta against the Ashfordly police by manipulating two young boys to do his dirty work, leading PC Joe and DS Dawson into finding and apprehending him. Meanwhile, Dawn teaches PC Younger ballroom dancing so that he can partner with Joyce Jowett at a charity event, and David takes up pottery to aid Peggy's collaboration with a furniture retailer.
351	3	"Mother of Invention"	Roger Bamford	Mark Holloway	26 October 2008	5.95
Carol finds herself struggling to help a single mother look after her child, unaware of her mental wellbeing, which is not helped when an old friend arrives with a woman she claims to be Carol's biological mother. Meanwhile, PC Wetherby recruits Peggy into helping him find the dog of the chief constable's wife, and Dawn convinces David to begin a chimney sweeping business with her, after Bernie receives the associated equipment as payment for a funeral.
352	4	"Living Off the Land"	Andrew Morgan	Susan Wilkins	2 November 2008	5.79
Joe and Carol visit a Travellers' camp to investigate a vicious attack on a hippie and a pregnant woman. One victim had recently clashed with Lord Ashfordly's latest gamekeeper, who is found murdered with his throat cut. Wetherby comes under suspicion but is preoccupied when he discovers his wife is having an affair. Meanwhile, David finds himself in competition with a competing taxi firm, run by an old foe of Peggy's.
353	5	"Guilty Secrets"	Gerry Mill	John Flanagan & Andrew McCulloch	9 November 2008	5.70
DS Dawson is accused of stealing £400 from the wife of a suspected criminal, during a raid following a tip-off. PC Mason is not convinced of her guilt, despite the evidence, and swiftly works to unmask the truth, discovering someone intends to destroy her career. Meanwhile, Bernie is shocked when he discovers he has a daughter and asks Blaketon to find her, though it leads to a heartbreaking dilemma.
354	6	"Strike Up the Band"	Jonas Grimas	Shaun McKenna	16 November 2008	5.08
A feud between two brass bands leads to a musician's death by apparent poisoning, but Sgt Miller discovers there is more to the conflict than a trophy. As they intervene, PC Mason and DS Dawson succumb to their attraction for each other, only for Carol to catch them in the act. Meanwhile, Dawn is swept off her feet by a handsome young man, about whom Blaketon has suspicions. Things seem perfect for her, until Peggy finds her in the garage crying, after discovering the truth about their relationship.
355	7	"Return Crossing"	Judith Dine	Peter Gibbs	19 April 2009	6.24
Carol asks PC Mason to help a smuggler's widow after she discovers she has received death threats from an associate of her late husband. When he does, he learns that her dead husband had a partner who they aided in with a number of crimes. Realising he seeks to keep them going despite her reluctance, matters soon escalate, forcing Joe to find a way of making her stop the trouble. Meanwhile, Blaketon helps a Polish veteran find a woman he fell in love with during the war.
356	8	"Looking for Isabella"	Jonas Grimas	Jane Hollowood	26 April 2009	5.95
When a boy becomes trapped in a well in the gardens of a seemingly deserted, derelict house, a media circus descends on the place as firemen attempt a rescue. However, matters become complicated when gunshots are fired from the house, endangering the rescue operation. Meanwhile, Peggy regrets renting out her spare room to a bothersome journalist who tries to exploit local gossip.
357	9	"The Hospital Job"	Andrew Morgan	Jonathan Critchley	3 May 2009	4.67
With Miller absent from police work all week Acting Sgt. Weatherby and DS Dawson requests assistance from Ashfordly police into investigating a list of stolen goods suspected of being in the possession of a shady antiques dealer. PC Mason soon discovers evidence that links the dealer to the items, when he discovers that a notorious burglar, who recently died, frequented the place with his children, unaware of the permanent harm he was doing to them and himself. Elsewhere, Jowett rallies the villagers when a group of Taoist monks become stranded en route to a monastery in Middlesbrough, but things soon change when the monks prove quite friendly to everyone.
358	10	"Ups and Downs"	Tony Prescott	John Flanagan & Andrew McCulloch	10 May 2009	4.96
A cat burglar begins targeting wealthy homes in the district, leading to DS Dawson recruiting help from PCs Mason and Wetherby to investigating the matter. At the same time, Peggy is thrilled to be reunited with an old friend, a former circus performer, and convinces David to spend time with them. However, both find their paths crossing, when the performer is discovered to be the thief, working under a major about whom Sgt Miller has suspicions. Meanwhile, Bernie worries about the whereabouts of Rosie, especially when the Australian she left with returns to the area with no idea where she is since they parted ways.
359	11	"Thursday's Children"	Roger Bamford	Michael Eaton	17 May 2009	5.36
PC Mason and DS Dawson travel to the last place in Australia that Rosie was known to be in, in order to hunt her down. Aided by a local police sergeant, they struggle to find much evidence linking the Australian she travelled with to her disappearance and decide to review whether she disappeared when she left for the western regions of the country. Meanwhile, Carol travels with them as far as Brisbane, to find out more about her long-lost brother, but reunites with them after a con artist tricks her and steals her money.
360	12	"The Middle of Somewhere"	Roger Bamford	Michael Eaton	24 May 2009	4.81
PC Mason and DS Dawson continue their search for Rosie, and soon discover from police records that it may be linked to the disappearance of another woman a few years ago. With the local police's help, they investigate another disappearance before an upcoming horse race and discover the horrible truth to Rosie's fate, a truth that hits hard to those who knew her back in Aidensfield. Meanwhile, Carol finally reunites with her long-lost brother and decides to catch up with him about his past, while a local bar owner tries to fix a race to ensure a favourite in the race does not make them lose a lot of money in their illicit betting operation.
361	13	"School of Hard Knocks"	Piotr Szkopiak	Peter Gibbs	31 May 2009	4.90
A member of the Territorial Army working as a teacher for Ashfordly School raises concerns when his tough acts of punishment put a troublemaking student in hospital. However, things go from bad to worse when a female teacher reveals to Carol that he raped her, and Ashfordly police discover that he lost a gun he took from an armoury, which PC Mason suspects might have been stolen by the student he picked on. Meanwhile, Peggy is shocked to find the body of a local tramp, who was well known for stealing from those he worked for, leaving David to question if the village should set aside an upcoming trip to London to fund the tramp's funeral.
362	14	"The Runaways"	Judith Dine	John Milne	7 June 2009	4.90
An accountant and his family crash into a tractor after being chased down a country lane by another car. PC Mason and Sgt Miller are intrigued by the family's erratic behaviour and discover that they are fleeing from a gangster who will do anything to retrieve incriminating documents. Meanwhile, David comes into some money and buys an old Jeep with a surprising military history, one which surprises those who fought in the Second World War.
363	15	"Cashing In"	Gerry Mill	Shaun McKenna	14 June 2009	4.32
Ashfordly police find themselves dealing with a series of counterfeit notes, which DS Dawson identifies as being made by a gang that had recently been arrested, except for the ringleader who managed to escape with his girlfriend. Suspecting they are seeking actual money to buy passage out of the country, the police work hard to apprehend them, unaware of the risks that the counterfeiter will take to escape. Meanwhile, Miller is horrified when his wife is arrested for shoplifting and exposes the martial troubles they have, and Bernie is excited when he becomes convinced his idol Judy Garland has secretly moved to Aidensfield.
364	16	"A Whiter Shade of Pale"	Andrew Morgan	Mark Holloway	18 July 2010	6.25
A new resident to Aidensfield is found beaten to death in her kitchen, shortly after announcing her intentions to marry a local businessman, despite them already being married. Although PC Mason and DS Dawson have suspicions on two men, Carol has grave worries about the victim's son, especially when she finds evidence that suggest he may have been involved in his mother's death. Meanwhile, David is caught in the middle when Dawn and Peggy operate competing food trucks on the day of the Ashfordly Cup final.
365	17	"The War of the Roses"	Jonas Grimas	Susan Wilkins	25 July 2010	5.07
PC Mason and Sgt Miller attempt an intervention to stop the harassment of a local farmer by his neighbours. However, the situation worsens when the farmer is given further trouble that culminates in a fire on their property that nearly kills them. At the same time, Dawn falls for a charming new barman at the pub and tries to cure him of his sudden angry outbursts, unaware he has an ulterior motive for being the area. Meanwhile, David helps Peggy inventory an estate but fears her shady dealings have upset the spirit of the deceased.
366	18	"Ties That Bind"	Judith Dine	John Flanagan & Andrew McCulloch	1 August 2010	4.71
Facing demotion for having an affair with a senior colleague, DS Dawson prepares to tackle her final case with CID, as they investigate a series of violent post office robberies. PC Mason swiftly assumes he is to blame, which places strain on his relationship with Carol, until he and Dawson are placed in danger when the robbers move onto a target CID did not anticipate being hit. Meanwhile, Blaketon is unhappy to find Peggy helping one of his friends with the cleaning while their wife is in a nursing home. However, when she reveals he is in possessions of items reported stolen due to kleptomania, he quickly has suspicions that his friend is holding back on something. [Final appearance of DS Rachel Dawson]
367	19	"Deadlier Than the Male"	Dominic Leclerc	Peter Gibbs	8 August 2010	5.06
Blaketon and PC Mason try to play peacemakers in a couple's tumultuous relationship, despite the wife's solicitor's best efforts to act in what she believes are the best interests of her client and achieve a divorce. Meanwhile, Peggy is delighted to be reunited with old friend Stan, but regrets letting him stay when his daughter tries to sour her relationship with David, and sets out to woo David and get Peggy out of the cottage.
368	20	"Jobs for the Boys"	Roger Bamford	Jane Hollowood	15 August 2010	5.14
Ashfordly police find themselves dealing with a modern day "Robin Hood" and discover a connection between their robberies and a series of envelopes to elderly residents carrying cash stolen during each robbery. At the same time, Blaketon and Ventress join forces to help investigate the disappearance of an estranged son who left home after a heated argument with his father. Both find their cases colliding, when it transpires that the robberies are related to questionable business ethics over the construction of a new housing estate.
369	21	"My One and Only"	Gerry Mill	Shaun McKenna	22 August 2010	5.29
An insurance salesman is shot dead outside his home, and a disgruntled customer of the victim is the initial suspect in the crime. As Ashfordly police handle the investigation, PC Mason discovers that not only did the victim sell fraudulent policies, but he also led a complicated double life, and soon discovers that the latter may have been found out by one of the wives he had. Meanwhile, Ventress stays at the Aidensfield Arms while his house is being repaired, causing problems for all, while Sgt Miller and Peggy both attempt to stop a war hero from drinking himself to death while on hard times.
370	22	"The Open Door"	Tim Dowd	Jonathan Critchley	29 August 2010	5.34
With Miller absent from police work all week, A lorry driver is savagely beaten by robbers, who steal the contents of his van before dumping it. When Ashfordly police trace where it comes from, they quickly discover that the robbers are unknowingly in possession of condemned meat, which could spark a health crisis in the district. PC Mason soon gets a lead on the suspects, when Carol discovers that a senile patient of hers is being visited by a man who claims to be her long-dead son. Meanwhile, Peggy agrees to housesit a mansion, and secretly opens it as a bed-and-breakfast, but things do not go to plan. [Final appearance of Sgt Jennifer Nokes]
371	23	"Pass the Parcel"	Judith Dine	Mark Holloway	5 September 2010	6.06
Ashfordly police work to stop a gang of safe robbers but face a complicated situation when one of them turns up dead, and, to recover a lost bag of explosives, the remaining robbers take everyone hostage at Dawn's birthday party. Meanwhile, Blaketon bets PC Younger and Ventress that he can uncover Wetherby's lunchtime activity, leading him into an embarrassing situation.
372	24	"Sweet Sorrow"	Roger Bamford	John Flanagan & Andrew McCulloch	12 September 2010	6.00
The arrival of a traumatised and wounded stranger in Aidensfield coincides with the discovery of a woman's body on the moors and sets off a chain of events that leaves Blaketon's life hanging in the balance.

=== Departures ===
- DS Rachel Dawson – Transferred back to London's West End and back into uniform after her stint with Ashfordly Police ends. ("Ties That Bind", Episode 18)
- Sgt Jennifer Nokes – Resigns and retires after her stint with Ashfordly Police ends. ("The Open Door", Episode 22)
