= List of The Bob Newhart Show episodes =

This is a list of episodes for The Bob Newhart Show, which was originally broadcast on CBS from 1972 to 1978, spanning six seasons and 142 half-hour episodes.

== Series overview ==
The first four seasons were released on DVD by 20th Century Fox, while seasons 5 and 6, along with The Bob Newhart Show: The Complete Series, have been released through Shout! Factory. Seasons 1–3 of the show were also made available for streaming and download in the digital format.

Season	Episodes	Originally released	
Season	Episodes	First released	Last released
1	24	September 16, 1972	March 10, 1973
2	24	September 15, 1973	March 2, 1974
3	24	September 14, 1974	March 8, 1975
4	24	September 13, 1975	February 28, 1976
5	24	September 25, 1976	March 19, 1977
6	22	September 24, 1977	April 1, 1978

== Episodes ==
=== Season 1 (1972–73) ===
No. overall	No. in season	Title	Directed by	Written by	Original release date	Prod. code
1	1	"Fly the Unfriendly Skies"	Jay Sandrich	David Davis & Lorenzo Music	September 16, 1972	7251
Bob brings Emily to his "fear of flying" therapy group to help her overcome her own fear of flying. Penny Marshall has a minor role in this episode as a stewardess.
2	2	"Tracy Grammar School, I'll Lick You Yet"	Jay Sandrich	Carl Gottlieb & George Yanok	September 23, 1972	7258
Bob tries to impress Emily's students, who find his job boring.
3	3	"Tennis, Emily?"	Alan Rafkin	David Davis & Lorenzo Music	September 30, 1972	7253
Bob is worried when a handsome, womanizing tennis pro (Peter Brown) praises Emily's beauty.
4	4	"Mom, I L-L-Love You"	Alan Rafkin	Dick Clair & Jenna McMahon	October 7, 1972	7252
Emily urges Bob to tell his mother (Martha Scott) that he loves her.
5	5	"Goodnight, Nancy"	Jay Sandrich	Susan Silver	October 21, 1972	7254
Emily is unexpectedly jealous of Bob's old girlfriend Nancy (Penny Fuller).
6	6	"Come Live with Me"	Alan Rafkin	Jerry Mayer	October 28, 1972	7256
Carol considers co-habitating with her boyfriend.
7	7	"Father Knows Worst"	Alan Rafkin	Tom Patchett & Jay Tarses	November 4, 1972	7255
Howard is crushed when his son Howie prefers spending time with Jerry.
8	8	"Don't Go to Bed Mad"	Alan Rafkin	Gene Thompson	November 11, 1972	7262
When the Hartleys have a fight, they resolve not to go to sleep until they've settled their differences.
9	9	"P.I.L.O.T."	Jay Sandrich	David Davis & Lorenzo Music	November 18, 1972	5536
The Hartleys try to adopt a child and meet with a woman (Louise Lasser) from the adoption agency. (Note: This is the original unaired pilot of the show, with some scenes added or re-shot.)
10	10	"Anything Happen While I Was Gone?"	Jay Sandrich	Martin Cohan	November 25, 1972	7260
Jerry announces his engagement to a woman he's only just met.
11	11	"I Want to Be Alone"	Alan Rafkin	Jerry Mayer	December 2, 1972	7261
Bob goes to a hotel for a few days to get some time alone, leading Howard to fear that the Hartleys are breaking up. Bernie Kopell has a role in this episode as a philandering doctor.
12	12	"Bob and Emily and Howard and Carol and Jerry"	Peter Baldwin	Charlotte Brown	December 9, 1972	7263
Howard and Carol start dating. Pat Morita has a minor role in this episode as a bartender.
13	13	"I Owe It All to You... But Not That Much"	Alan Rafkin	Martin Cohan	December 16, 1972	7257
Jerry starts going to Bob for therapy, which hurts their ability to be friends.
14	14	"His Busiest Season"	Peter Baldwin	David Davis & Lorenzo Music	December 23, 1972	7268
Bob invites his patients to a Christmas party at his apartment.
15	15	"Let's Get Away from It Almost"	Jay Sandrich	Tom Patchett & Jay Tarses	January 6, 1973	7265
The Hartleys spend an unpleasant vacation at a ski lodge.
16	16	"The Crash of Twenty-Nine Years Old"	Alan Rafkin	Charlotte Brown	January 13, 1973	7269
Depressed at turning twenty-nine, Carol decides to quit her job and do something new with her life.
17	17	"The Man with the Golden Wrist"	Alan Rafkin	Bill Idelson	January 20, 1973	7270
Bob is too nervous to wear the expensive watch that Emily bought him.
18	18	"The Two Loves of Dr. Hartley"	George Tyne	Gene Thompson	January 27, 1973	7264
One of Bob's patients (Emmaline Henry) falls in love with him.
19	19	"Not with My Sister You Don't"	Alan Rafkin	Frank Buxton	February 3, 1973	7266
Howard is extremely protective of his visiting sister Debbie (Heather Menzies).
20	20	"A Home Is Not Necessarily a House"	Peter Baldwin	David Davis & Lorenzo Music	February 10, 1973	7271
Bob and Emily consider moving out of their apartment and into a house.
21	21	"Emily, I'm Home... Emily?"	Rick Edelstein	Martin Cohan	February 17, 1973	7273
Emily is rarely home for Bob after she finds a full-time job.
22	22	"You Can't Win 'Em All"	Jerry London	Bill Idelson	February 24, 1973	7272
Bob becomes a local hero when his therapy helps a Chicago Cubs pitcher end a losing streak.
23	23	"Bum Voyage"	Martin Cohan	Austin & Irma Kalish	March 3, 1973	7274
Bob is reluctant to go on an ocean voyage with Emily and abandon his therapy group.
24	24	"Who's Been Sleeping on My Couch?"	Alan Rafkin	Jerry Mayer	March 10, 1973	7275
Jerry starts making a nuisance of himself while recovering from a bad breakup.

=== Season 2 (1973–74) ===
No. overall	No. in season	Title	Directed by	Written by	Original release date	Prod. code
25	1	"The Last TV Show"	Jay Sandrich	Charlotte Brown	September 15, 1973	7355
At the prodding of his patients, Bob reluctantly accepts an offer to allow TV cameras into a group therapy session.
26	2	"Motel"	Jay Sandrich	Tom Patchett & Jay Tarses	September 22, 1973	7360
Bob and Jerry go to a motel in Peoria so they can watch a football broadcast that's not available in Chicago.
27	3	"Backlash"	George Tyne	Susan Silver	September 29, 1973	7352
The Hartleys have to cancel their planned vacation in Mexico because of Bob's back pain.
28	4	"Somebody Down Here Likes Me"	Jerry London	Peter Myerson	October 6, 1973	7357
A minister (John McMartin) decides to leave the Church because of Bob's advice, leaving Bob overcome with guilt.
29	5	"Emily in for Carol"	Alan Rafkin	Jerry Mayer	October 13, 1973	7356
When Carol is on vacation, the other doctors on Bob's floor hire Emily as the new receptionist.
30	6	"Have You Met Miss Dietz?"	George Tyne	Bill Idelson	October 20, 1973	7353
Howard and Jerry compete for the affections of an attractive recent divorcée (Mariette Hartley)
31	7	"Old Man Rivers"	Martin Cohan	Martin Cohan	October 27, 1973	7359
Carol starts dating a much older man (Jeff Corey).
32	8	"Mister Emily Hartley"	Jerry London	Charlotte Brown	November 3, 1973	7363
Bob feels humiliated when Emily turns out to have a higher I.Q. than he does and is invited to join a high-I.Q. group.
33	9	"Mutiny on the Hartley"	Peter Baldwin	Tom Patchett & Jay Tarses	November 10, 1973	7365
Bob's patients revolt against him when he raises his hourly rates.
34	10	"I'm Okay, You're Okay, So What's Wrong?"	George Tyne	Earl Barret	November 17, 1973	7364
Fearing that their marriage has lost its spark, Bob and Emily go to a marriage counselor (Katherine Helmond).
35	11	"Fit, Fat and Forty-One"	Peter Baldwin	Bill Idelson and Harvey Miller	November 24, 1973	7358
Bob goes on a diet, determined to keep his resolution to lose weight before his forty-first birthday.
36	12	"Blues for Mr. Borden"	Jerry London	Tom Patchett & Jay Tarses	December 1, 1973	7366
Howard's ex-wife is getting married again—and this time, she's marrying a pilot.
37	13	"My Wife Belongs to Daddy"	Jerry London	Jerry Mayer	December 8, 1973	7362
A visit from Emily's parents (John Randolph and Ann Rutherford) has Bob feeling intimidated by his father-in-law.
38	14	"T.S. Elliot"	Peter Baldwin	Gerry Renert & Jeff Wilheim	December 15, 1973	7368
Mr. Carlin goes on a date with Carol.
39	15	"I'm Dreaming of a Slight Christmas"	Peter Baldwin	Tom Patchett & Jay Tarses	December 22, 1973	7370
Bob is trapped in his office on Christmas Eve.
40	16	"Oh, Brother"	Peter Baldwin	Martin Cohan	January 5, 1974	7367
Jerry's brother (Raul Julia) starts stealing his patients.
41	17	"The Modernization of Emily"	Peter Baldwin	Charlotte Brown	January 12, 1974	7371
Shaken after meeting a former student who's all grown up, Emily tries to recapture her youth with an embarrassing new wardrobe.
42	18	"The Jobless Corps"	Peter Baldwin	Tom Patchett & Jay Tarses	January 19, 1974	7374
After Howard is laid off, he joins Bob's therapy group for unemployed people.
43	19	"Clink Shrink"	Peter Bonerz	Paul B. Lichtman and Howard Storm	January 26, 1974	7369
Bob gets a suspiciously expensive gift from a client (Henry Winkler) who is an ex-convict.
44	20	"Mind Your Own Business"	Alan Rafkin	Tom Patchett & Jay Tarses	February 2, 1974	7351
To help manage his money, Bob hires a business manager (Ron Rifkin) who puts him on a budget of $50 a week.
45	21	"A Love Story"	Peter Bonerz	Martin Cohan	February 9, 1974	7375
Howard falls in love with Bob's sister Ellen (Pat Finley) even though she's engaged to another man. NOTE: First appearance of Ellen.
46	22	"By the Way... You're Fired"	Peter Baldwin	Barbara Gallagher & Sybil Adelman	February 16, 1974	7372
Distracted by a new boyfriend, Carol neglects her duties at the office and is fired by Jerry for incompetence.
47	23	"Confessions of an Orthodontist"	Peter Baldwin	Tom Patchett & Jay Tarses	February 23, 1974	7376
Bob temporarily takes over a practice for another psychologist (Roger Perry), including a ditzy secretary (Teri Garr). One of his first patients is Jerry, who confesses he's in love with Emily.
48	24	"A Matter of Principal"	Don Bustany	Arnie Kogen & Ray Jessel	March 2, 1974	7373
Emily stands on her principles and defies an order to let an unqualified student skip a grade.

=== Season 3 (1974–75) ===
No. overall	No. in season	Title	Directed by	Written by	Original release date	Prod. code
49	1	"Big Brother Is Watching"	Robert Moore	Charlotte Brown	September 14, 1974	4052
Bob disapproves of the idea of his sister Ellen moving in with Howard.
50	2	"The Battle of the Groups"	Alan Rafkin	Tom Patchett & Jay Tarses	September 21, 1974	4051
Bob unwisely brings two of his therapy groups together at a weekend retreat.
51	3	"The Great Rimpau Medical Arts Co-op Experiment"	George Tyne	Coleman Mitchell & Geoffrey Neigher	September 28, 1974	4056
Jerry organizes all the doctors on his floor into a medical co-op arrangement.
52	4	"The Separation Story"	Peter Bonerz	Story by : Bob Garland; Teleplay by : Tom Patchett & Jay Tarses	October 5, 1974	4054
Emily moves out of the apartment and into a college dorm so she can study to get her Master's degree.
53	5	"Sorry, Wrong Mother"	Jay Sandrich	Charlotte Brown	October 12, 1974	4067
Ellen tries to get Howard's son Howie (Moosie Drier) to like her. John Ritter plays a waiter at an ice cream shop.
54	6	"The Grey Flannel Shrink"	Peter Bonerz	Jerry Mayer	October 19, 1974	4064
Bob accepts an offer to become the in-house therapist for a major corporation.
55	7	"Dr. Ryan's Express"	Alan Rafkin	Tom Patchett & Jay Tarses	October 26, 1974	4059
When Carol is away again, Jerry hires an incompetent temp.
56	8	"Brutally Yours, Bob Hartley"	Alan Rafkin	John Rappaport	November 2, 1974	4062
Bob vows to be completely honest with everyone, which soon leaves everyone hating him.
57	9	"Ship of Shrinks"	Alan Rafkin	Coleman Mitchell & Geoffrey Neigher	November 9, 1974	4066
Because of an embarrassing article published under his byline, Bob has second thoughts about attending a psychology conference in Hawaii.
58	10	"Life Is a Hamburger"	George Tyne	Jerry Mayer	November 16, 1974	4068
Carol announces her engagement to her weird poet boyfriend (Richard Schaal).
59	11	"An American Family"	Peter Bonerz	Charlotte Brown	November 23, 1974	4069
Bob and Emily's Thanksgiving plans are threatened when Bob's mother gets into an argument with Emily's father.
60	12	"We Love You... Good-bye"	Peter Bonerz	Charlotte Brown	November 30, 1974	4061
Emily's revelations about Bob's chauvinism get him kicked out of his own therapy group for women.
61	13	"Jerry Robinson Crusoe"	Alan Rafkin	Erik Tarloff	December 7, 1974	4055
Jerry decides to leave everything behind and move to a South Seas island with his new girlfriend (Gail Strickland).
62	14	"Serve for Daylight"	Alan Rafkin	Jerry Mayer	December 14, 1974	4071
Bob wants to win a tennis match but doesn't think his doubles partner, Emily, is good enough to win.
63	15	"Home Is Where the Hurt Is"	Alan Rafkin	Tom Patchett & Jay Tarses	December 21, 1974	4065
The Hartleys have to spend Christmas Eve listening to Carol talk about her depressing family and personal relationships.
64	16	"Tobin's Back in Town"	Peter Bonerz	Michael Zinberg	January 4, 1975	4057
Ellen's ex-fiancé (Fred Willard) tries to win her back from Howard.
65	17	"Think Smartly—Vote Hartley"	Bob Finkel	Coleman Mitchell & Geoffrey Neigher	January 11, 1975	4070
Emily gets Bob to run for a spot on the school board.
66	18	"The Way We Weren't"	James Burrows	Roger Beatty	January 18, 1975	4063
Emily finds out a secret about the girl Bob was dating before he met her.
67	19	"A Pound of Flesh"	Alan Rafkin	Jerry Mayer	January 25, 1975	4074
Jerry is angry at Bob for refusing to lend him money.
68	20	"My Business Is Shrinking"	Alan Rafkin	Arnie Kogen & Ray Jessel	February 1, 1975	4053
Bob himself joins a therapy group to get some help for his recent depression.
69	21	"The New Look"	Peter Bonerz	Gordon & Lynne Farr	February 8, 1975	4073
Bob's routine is disrupted after Emily gets new furniture for the apartment.
70	22	"Bob Hits the Ceiling"	Jay Sandrich	Phil Davis	February 15, 1975	4072
Bob reluctantly agrees to a therapy session to help Emily's friend (Cynthia Harris) with her marriage problems.
71	23	"Emily Hits the Ceiling"	James Burrows	Jerry Mayer	February 22, 1975	4075
Emily talks Bob into being a counselor at the summer camp she's organizing.
72	24	"The Ceiling Hits Bob"	Alan Rafkin	Tom Patchett & Jay Tarses	March 8, 1975	4076
Everything's collapsing around Bob: Howard and Ellen announce they're moving to New York, Carol announces she's looking for a new job, and the ceiling literally collapses in his office.

=== Season 4 (1975–76) ===
No. overall	No. in season	Title	Directed by	Written by	Original release date	Prod. code
73	1	"The Longest Good-bye"	James Burrows	Tom Patchett & Jay Tarses	September 13, 1975	5054
Bob gets a visit from his old college buddy, the Peeper (Tom Poston).
74	2	"Here's Looking at You, Kid"	Peter Bonerz	Gordon & Lynne Farr	September 20, 1975	5052
Howard decides it's time to propose to Ellen.
75	3	"Death of a Fruitman"	Peter Bonerz	Tom Patchett & Jay Tarses	September 27, 1975	5063
One of Bob's patients dies after being crushed by a truckload of zucchini. This episode about a recurring character's unusual death aired one month before the famous Chuckles Bites the Dust episode of The Mary Tyler Moore Show.
76	4	"Change Is Gonna Do Me Good"	John Erman	Gordon & Lynne Farr	October 4, 1975	5058
Emily and Bob decide to get out of their rut by taking on each other's household chores.
77	5	"The Heavyweights"	Bob Claver	Tom Patchett & Jay Tarses	October 11, 1975	5053
Carol is stuck with one of Bob's overweight patients (Cliff Osmond) on a date.
78	6	"Carol's Wedding"	Michael Zinberg	Gordon & Lynne Farr	October 18, 1975	5060
Carol marries Larry Bondurant (Will Mackenzie) despite knowing him for less than a day.
79	7	"Shrinks Across the Sea"	Bob Claver	Phil Doran & Douglas Arango	October 25, 1975	5061
The Hartleys play host to a supercilious French psychologist (René Auberjonois).
80	8	"What's It All About, Albert?"	Michael Zinberg	Phil Davis	November 1, 1975	5059
After realizing that he's not actually helping any of his patients, Bob goes to his old mentor (Keenan Wynn) for guidance.
81	9	"Who Is Mr. X?"	Peter Bonerz	Bruce Kane	November 8, 1975	5056
In an interview with a vicious TV talk show host (Jennifer Warren) Bob lets it slip that one of his patients was a prominent politician.
82	10	"Seemed Like a Good Idea at the Time"	Richard Kinon	Tom Patchett & Jay Tarses	November 15, 1975	5051
In an episode framed as an homage to The Sting, Bob enters into an uncomfortable new partnership with an upscale psychologist.
83	11	"Over the River and Through the Woods"	James Burrows	Bruce Kane	November 22, 1975	5065
Bob spends a depressing Thanksgiving with Jerry, Howard and Mr. Carlin, getting drunk, watching football and ordering "Moo Goo Gai Pan." In 1997, TV Guide ranked this episode #9 on its list of the 100 Greatest Episodes. In 2009, it moved to #37.
84	12	"Fathers and Sons and Mothers"	James Burrows	Arnold Kane	November 29, 1975	5057
Bob's mother (Martha Scott) comes to visit and won't leave him alone.
85	13	"The Article"	Michael Zinberg	Erik Tarloff	December 6, 1975	5062
The doctors in Bob's building regret giving Ellen permission to write an article about them.
86	14	"A Matter of Vice-Principal"	Peter Bonerz	Gordon & Lynne Farr	December 13, 1975	5069
Emily is promoted to Vice-Principal over another teacher who's been at the school longer.
87	15	"Bob Has to Have His Tonsils Out, So He Spends Christmas Eve in the Hospital"	James Burrows	Tom Patchett & Jay Tarses	December 20, 1975	5068
Bob has to... well, the title pretty much says it all.
88	16	"No Sale"	Eddie Ryder	Michael Zinberg	January 3, 1976	5055
Bob and Jerry invest in Carlin's real estate deal, but discover that it involves evicting an old man (Malcolm Atterbury).
89	17	"Carol at 6:01"	Peter Bonerz	Gordon & Lynne Farr	January 10, 1976	5066
Carol finds that her new husband, Larry, is giving her more attention than she can handle.
90	18	"Warden Gordon Borden"	James Burrows	Gordon & Lynne Farr	January 17, 1976	5070
Howard gets a visit from his brother Gordon Borden the Game Warden (William Redfield), who becomes his romantic rival for Ellen (Pat Finley). NOTE: Final appearance of Ellen.
91	19	"My Boy Guillermo"	Alan Myerson	Sy Rosen	January 24, 1976	5071
Jerry's free-spirited ex-girlfriend Courtney (Gail Strickland) returns, offering to let him marry her and help raise her son.
92	20	"Duke of Dunk"	Peter Bonerz	Douglas Arango & Phil Doran	January 31, 1976	5072
Bob tries to help a basketball star (Anthony Costello) become better at teamwork.
93	21	"Guaranteed Not to Shrink"	James Burrows	Sy Rosen	February 7, 1976	5067
Carol decides to follow in Bob's footsteps and enrolls in a night school psychology course.
94	22	"Birth of a Salesman"	John C. Chulay	Sy Rosen	February 14, 1976	5074
Bob teaches the art of assertiveness to Mr. Herd, whose first act after learning to stand up for himself is to bring a lawsuit against Bob.
95	23	"The Boy Next Door"	Peter Bonerz	Hugh Wilson	February 21, 1976	5073
Howard gains custody of his son Howie (Moosie Drier), but leaves most of the actual work of taking care of him to Bob and Emily. Bob hires a gorgeous young woman (Brooke Adams) as Howie's babysitter.
96	24	"Peeper Two"	Michael Zinberg	Tom Patchett & Jay Tarses	February 28, 1976	5075
The Peeper (Tom Poston) returns to Chicago after being dumped by his wife, and Jerry shows him how to live life as a swinging bachelor.

=== Season 5 (1976–77) ===
No. overall	No. in season	Title	Directed by	Written by	Original release date	Prod. code
97	1	"Enter Mrs. Peeper"	Michael Zinberg	Gordon & Lynne Farr	September 25, 1976	6066
The Peeper returns yet again, this time with a new wife.
98	2	"Caged Fury"	Michael Zinberg	Gordon & Lynne Farr	October 2, 1976	6062
Emily accidentally gets herself and Bob trapped in the basement storage locker while they're preparing for their Bicentennial party.
99	3	"Some of My Best Friends Are..."	James Burrows	Pat Jones & Donald Reiker	October 9, 1976	6054
Bob has to handle the prejudice in his group when Mr. Plager (Howard Hesseman) comes out as gay.
100	4	"Still Crazy After All These Years"	Alan Myerson	Hugh Wilson	October 16, 1976	6061
In The Bob Newhart Show's 100th episode, Howard sees a therapist (Leonard Stone) to cure himself of his dependency on Bob and Emily, but the cure turns him into an exact clone of his doctor.
101	5	"The Great Rent Strike"	John C. Chulay	David Lloyd	October 23, 1976	6059
Slumlord Mr. Carlin takes over Bob and Emily's building, leading Bob to organize a rent strike.
102	6	"Et tu, Carol?"	Alan Myerson	Gary David Goldberg	October 30, 1976	6058
Bob must find a new receptionist after Carol quits.
103	7	"Send This Boy to Camp"	Michael Zinberg	David Lloyd	November 6, 1976	6067
Bob and Jerry volunteer to organize a camping trip for underprivileged children.
104	8	"A Crime Most Foul"	John C. Chulay	Sy Rosen	November 13, 1976	6064
Everyone, including Emily, is a potential suspect after Bob's new tape recorder vanishes.
105	9	"The Slammer"	Michael Zinberg	Gordon & Lynne Farr	November 20, 1976	6070
Bob and the Peeper visit the bar they used to go to in college, and get arrested when the bar is raided.
106	10	"Jerry's Retirement"	Alan Myerson	Hugh Wilson	November 27, 1976	6051
When Jerry comes into a lot of money, he decides to quit his practice and do nothing for the rest of his life.
107	11	"Here's to You, Mrs. Robinson"	James Burrows	Gordon & Lynne Farr	December 4, 1976	6056
The newly wealthy and retired Jerry goes on a quest to find his biological parents.
108	12	"Breaking Up Is Hard to Do"	Peter Bonerz	Sy Rosen	December 11, 1976	6068
Bob is stunned when his parents announce they're separating. John Holland guest stars as Brian McDermott, the new man in the life of Bob's mother (Martha Scott).
109	13	"Making Up Is the Thing to Do"	Harvey Medlinsky	Gordon & Lynne Farr	December 25, 1976	6072
Bob invites his separated parents to Christmas dinner to try to get them back together.
110	14	"Love Is the Blindest"	Will Mackenzie	Gary David Goldberg	January 8, 1977	6063
Mr. Carlin tries to impress his attractive new secretary the only way he knows how: lying.
111	15	"The Ironwood Experience"	Peter Bonerz	Phil Davis	January 15, 1977	6065
Bob gives a lecture at the Ironwood Interpersonal Relationships at the invitation of its director (Max Showalter), but is surprised when his entire audience shows up naked.
112	16	"Of Mice and Men"	Peter Bonerz	Bruce Kane	January 22, 1977	6053
Emily plays the wife in a role-playing game with Bob's group of henpecked men.
113	17	"Halls of Hartley"	James Burrows	Michael Zinberg	January 29, 1977	6055
Bob considers leaving the city and taking a position at a college in the sticks.
114	18	"The Heartbreak Kid"	Dick Martin	Sy Rosen	February 5, 1977	6052
A psychology student (Tovah Feldshuh) gets a crush on Bob while interning with him.
115	19	"Death Be My Destiny"	Michael Zinberg	Sy Rosen	February 12, 1977	6073
After a near-death experience, Bob becomes obsessed with the fact of his own mortality. In 1997, TV Guide ranked this episode #50 on its list of the 100 Greatest Episodes.
116	20	"Taxation Without Celebration"	Peter Bonerz	Sy Rosen	February 19, 1977	6060
Bob has to choose between celebrating his wedding anniversary and doing his taxes on time.
117	21	"Desperate Sessions"	Dick Martin	Michael Zinberg & Michael Davidson	February 26, 1977	6071
A bank robber (Robert Pine) takes Bob as a hostage.
118	22	"The Mentor"	Michael Zinberg	Gary David Goldberg	March 5, 1977	6069
On Bob's advice, Carol's husband Larry opens up a travel agency—in Bob's building.
119	23	"Shrinking Violence"	Peter Bonerz	Sy Rosen	March 12, 1977	6074
Emily has trouble expressing anger against an obnoxious mechanic (Robert Ridgely), so Bob tries to show her how it's done.
120	24	"You're Having My Hartley"	Peter Bonerz	Gordon & Lynne Farr	March 19, 1977	6075
Bob dreams that both Carol and Emily are pregnant. Note: This script was originally written as the series finale. When Newhart decided to return for one more season and didn't want to play a father, the episode was rewritten into a dream sequence.

=== Season 6 (1977–78) ===
No. overall	No. in season	Title	Directed by	Written by	Original release date	Prod. code
121	1	"Bob's Change of Life"	Peter Bonerz	Glen Charles & Les Charles	September 24, 1977	7051
Bob and Emily move to a new apartment.
122	2	"Ex-Con Job"	Michael Zinberg	Ziggy Steinberg	October 1, 1977	7056
Bob leads a new therapy group for ex-convicts.
123	3	"A Jackie Story"	Michael Zinberg	Lloyd Garver	October 8, 1977	7053
Jerry is worried that he's not good enough for his girlfriend, while Bob treats a ventriloquist who thinks his dummy is real.
124	4	"Who Was That Masked Man?"	Dick Martin	Glen Charles & Les Charles	October 15, 1977	7058
After Mr. Peterson's wife kicks him out, he bonds with Mr. Carlin.
125	5	"Carlin's New Suit"	Dick Martin	Andrew Smith	October 22, 1977	7061
A single mother (Loni Anderson) brings a false paternity suit against Mr. Carlin, who goes along with it because he likes her son (Sparky Marcus).
126	6	"A Day in the Life"	Dick Martin	Kathy Donnell & Madelyn Dimaggio Wagner	October 29, 1977	7054
Bob wants to go to New Orleans for a week, but first has to pacify all his patients in only one day.
127	7	"My Son the Comedian"	Dick Martin	David Lloyd	November 12, 1977	7059
Howard's son (Moosie Drier) announces that he wants to drop out of school and become a stand-up comic.
128	8	"You're Fired, Mr. Chips"	Peter Bonerz	Lloyd Garver	November 19, 1977	7063
Bob hires his former professor (Ralph Bellamy) to help with his practice, and soon has to fire the old man.
129	9	"Shallow Throat"	Dick Martin	Earl Pomerantz	November 26, 1977	7064
Bob faces the issue of doctor/patient confidentiality when a patient confesses to a robbery.
130	10	"A Girl in Her Twenties"	Peter Bonerz	Laura Levine	December 3, 1977	7055
While Bob is away, Emily meets an old neighbor (Mildred Natwick) who has never adjusted to the modern world. Note: First of five episodes this season which were shot without Newhart, who appears only in pre-recorded sequences on the telephone.
131	11	"Grand Delusion"	Dick Martin	Lloyd Garver	December 17, 1977	7067
Bob and Emily both imagine what life would be like if they were married to other people. Episode features Morgan Fairchild in what is possibly her first TV guest appearance.
132	12	"'Twas the Pie Before Christmas"	Dick Martin	Phil Davis	December 24, 1977	7057
Bob's patients once again boycott him over a rate increase, this time just before his Christmas party.
133	13	"Freudian Ship"	Peter Bonerz	Earl Pomerantz	January 7, 1978	7069
Bob goes on a cruise with Emily to get away from work, but can't resist practicing a little psychology for free.
134	14	"Grizzly Emily"	Peter Bonerz	Laura Levine	January 14, 1978	7062
On a camping trip, Emily is annoyed by the sexist attitudes of Bob's father. Note: Second of five episodes in this season shot without Newhart.
135	15	"Son of Ex-Con Job"	Michael Zinberg	Emily Purdum Marshall	January 21, 1978	7070
Bob's ex-con patients decide to start their own business.
136	16	"Group on a Hot Tin Roof"	Michael Zinberg	Andrew Smith	January 28, 1978	7068
Mr. Plager writes a play based on his experiences in Bob's group.
137	17	"Emily Carlin, Emily Carlin"	Peter Bonerz	Laura Levine	February 4, 1978	7065
Mr. Carlin asks Emily to pretend to be his wife at his high school reunion. Note: Third of five episodes shot this season without Newhart.
138	18	"Easy for You to Say"	Dick Martin	Andrew Smith	February 11, 1978	7071
Bob helps a man get over his stuttering problem.
139	19	"It Didn't Happen One Night"	Dick Martin	Laura Levine	February 18, 1978	7073
While Bob is away, his friends suspect Emily is up to something with a handsome old flame (David Hedison). Note: Fourth of five episodes shot this season without Newhart.
140	20	"Carol Ankles for Indie-Prod"	Mark Tinker	Lloyd Garver	March 4, 1978	7072
Carol accepts an offer to become Mr. Carlin's new assistant.
141	21	"Crisis in Education"	Peter Bonerz	Earl Pomerantz	March 11, 1978	7074
The principal of Emily's school leaves town, leaving her to deal with irate parents. Note: This is the fifth and final episode that was shot this season without Newhart.
142	22	"Happy Trails to You"	Michael Zinberg and Peter Bonerz	Glen Charles & Les Charles and Lloyd Garver	April 1, 1978	7075
In the series finale, Bob and Emily prepare to leave Chicago for a teaching job at a college in Oregon.
