= From a Bird's Eye View =

British television series

- Genre: Sitcom
- Created by: Sheldon Leonard
- Starring: Millicent Martin; Patte Finley; Peter Jones
- Opening theme: Frank Barber; Jack Fishman
- Composer: Frank Barber
- Country of origin: United Kingdom
- Original language: English
- No. of seasons: 1
- No. of episodes: 16 (list of episodes)

Production
- Executive producer: Sheldon Leonard
- Producer: Jack Greenwood
- Running time: 25 minutes
- Production companies: Sheldon Leonard Productions; ATV; ITC Entertainment

Original release
- Network: ATV (UK)/NBC (US)
- Release: 18 September 1970 – 21 April 1971

From a Bird's Eye View is a 1970 ATV and ITC Entertainment co-produced sitcom. In the United States it aired on NBC, which had originally ordered the series as an entry in the 1969–70 TV season but pushed it back to the 1970–71 season as a mid-season replacement.

The series followed two International Airlines stewardesses, a scatterbrained Briton and a savvy American, as they flew the London-European routes. The series ran for 16 25-minute colour episodes.

The series was not a big success in either the UK or the US, but ITC re-used the format (and the writers and crew) for the Shirley MacLaine series Shirley's World. That show also flopped, but ran for one more episode than From a Bird's Eye View.

== Production notes ==
Sir Lew Grade wanted to make a comedy film series that would appeal on both sides of the Atlantic starring Millicent Martin. He sent six comedy sketches of Martin to producer Sheldon Leonard and he came up with the premise of From a Bird's Eye View (although two other titles were being considered, Meet Millie and Up She Goes).

Leonard cast Patte Finley from 160 girls he interviewed over a seven-month period when he responded to her personality and that at 5'3" she would not dwarf Martin's 5'1".

Martin and Finley both underwent an official training course at the B.E.A. training centre in stewardess's duties including meal presentation, bar service, address system and survival drill.

== Cast and characters ==
- Millicent Martin as Millie Grover
- Patte Finley as Maggie Ralston
- Peter Jones as Clive Beauchamp
- Robert Cawdron as Uncle Bert Quigley
- Noel Hood as Ms. Fosdyke (Mr Beauchamp's secretary)

Peter Jones, Patte Finley, and Millicent Martin

== Episode list ==
Filmed on location and at Pinewood Studios England.

Airdate and order is for ITV on the Network DVD.

No.	Title	Directed by	Written by	Original release date
1	"The Difficult Passenger"	Ralph Levy	T. E. B. Clarke	18 September 1970
Mr Barker is a difficult passenger who humiliates and propositions Millie on a flight from London to Berlin and Millie is determined to get even at their overnight hotel. Maggie discovers he is Mystery shopper and vainly attempts to stop Millie. Stars Robert Coote, Jess Conrad, Michael Wolf and Jerold Wells.
2	"Never Put it in Writing"	Ralph Levy	John Muir and Eric Green	25 September 1970
When Millie wrongly overhears Mr Beauchamp is going to fire Maggie she writes an insulting letter tendering her own resignation and then has to take desperate measures to recover the letter when Maggie discovers she was mistaken. Stars Arthur Mullard and Angus Lennie.
3	"Wife Trouble"	Ralph Levy	T. E. B. Clarke	2 October 1970
When his fiery Italian wife walks off the plane bound for Nice, her English businessman husband needs a replacement wife to land an important job. To Maggie's horror Millie volunteers, Stars Richard Caldicot, Neil Stacy, Robert Rietti and Dora Reisser.
4	"Millie's Moveable Feast"	Ralph Levy	R.S. Allen and Harvey Bullock	9 October 1970
Millie acts as cook and maid for her next-door neighbours' dinner party and to save Millie's job Maggie invites Mr Beauchamp around for a meal but there is only enough food for one party. Stars Polly Adams, Phillip Manikum, Stephen Jack and Jess Conrad.
5	"Hate-In"	Ralph Levy	Pat Dunlop	16 October 1970
Millie has been dating, Mr Lemon, a perfect gentleman until he meets Maggie and turns into a lothario much to Millie's chagrin. Millie and Maggie fall out. Guest stars Richard Briers, Barry Andrews and Gábor Baraker.
6	"Home is Where Your Heart Is"	Ralph Levy	Anthony Marriott and Scot Finch	23 October 1970
Poor staff scores result in Mr Beecham's new schedules separating Millie to London and Maggie to Liverpool. Millie's uncle Bert's plan to improve their scores gets them fired. Stars Frank Thornton and Bartlett Mullins.
7	"Nobody Sleeps on a Honeymoon"	Ralph Levy	Carl Kleinschmitt	30 October 1970
A honeymoon couple on the girls' flight to Rome have nowhere to stay and Millie secretly gives them their hotel room and has to keep Maggie getting any sleep. Stars Nicholas Ball, Margo Andrew and Gordon Rollings.
8	"Family Tree"	Ralph Levy	Bernie Rothman	6 November 1970
On their first anniversary as colleagues Millie and Maggie decided to surprise each other. Maggie with a party and Millie presenting Maggie her family tree until Mr Beauchamp points out Maggie's ancestors were axe murderers, stranglers, and poisoners. Guest stars John Sharp, Joan Hickson, Carmen Munroe and Richard Franklin.
9	"Highland Fling"	John Robbins	Torn Brennard and Ray Bottomley	13 November 1970
Millie and Maggie's unemployed neighbour gets a job in a Scottish castle owned by Lord MacBracken and invites them to visit. Mr Beauchamp invites himself and soon all three discover the castle is haunted. Guest stars Clive Dunn and John Laurie.
10	"I Too was a Novice"	Peter Duffell	Brad Ashton	20 November 1970
Millie and Maggie have a very nervous trainee stewardess on board and they tell her the tale of when Millie was the trainee and Maggie the instructor. Stars George Tovey (as Millie's father), Gay Hamilton, and Hilary Pritchard.
11	"Russian Roulette, Millie Style"	Ralph Levy	Lew Schwarz	27 November 1970
A Russian shot putter gets drunk on Millie's flight and follows her home and is mistaken for a mad bomber. Maggie, Uncle Bert, and Mr Beecham all become involved in trying to prevent an international incident. Guest stars Yuri Borienko, Richard Marner, Graham Armitage and Sheila Bernette.
12	"All in a Day's Work"	Ralph Levy	Stan Cutler and Martin Donovan	4 December 1970
Millie's uncle is horrified when he reads in the newspaper that his niece is linked with, Burton Phillips, a film star lothario. To prove how dull their job is Millie and Maggie invite Uncle Bert on a flight to Rome only to be invited to one of the film stars notorious parties. Stars Edward Judd and Robert Rietti.
13	"Hurricane Millie"	Ralph Levy	Sid Dorfman	11 December 1970
Maggie likes a young Irish songwriter and on her flight to Nice he leaves a bill for drinks when he decided to treat the other passengers. He leaves the girls an unpublished song as collateral and tries to win the money back at the casino with no success thanks to Millie. Millie and Maggie decide to promote the song on the return flight. Stars Kenneth Cranham, Robert Rietti and Gordon Rollings. Notes to episode: The song "Head in the Clouds" was written by Frank Barber and Jack Fishman. Robert Cawdron plays another character in this episode.
14	"Sicilian Affair"	John Robbins	John Warren and John Singer	18 December 1970
Rudy a friend of the girls is left property in Sicilly and he is sole heir. Maggie and Millie take holiday leave to accompany him to Sicilly and walk into a family vendetta. Guest stars Alexandra Bastedo, Aubrey Morris, David Prowse, Guido Adorni and Roy Evans.
15	"Witness for the Persecution"	Peter Duffell	Pat Dunlop	1 January 1971
Following complaints about Maggie and Millie Mr Beauchamp travels on their flight to Madrid and he ends up in jail when a suspected fraudster switches passports. The girls decide to help the fraudster by leaving Beauchamp in jail but in the end find themselves in the same cell. Guest stars Ferdy Mayne, Bartlett Mullins and Reginald Barratt.
16	"The Matchmakers"	Ralph Levy	Pat Dunlop, story by Reuben Ship	21 April 1971
Uncle Bert has been staying with the girls for a week and is driving them crazy. Mr Beauchamp's American cousin, Beatrice Beal, has come to stay with him and causing chaos. The three decide to matchmake and after Beatrice has a makeover and a night out Uncle Bert proposes but regrets it in the morning. Stars Evelyn Keyes.

== DVD ==
Network released the series on DVD with an image gallery and promotional PDF file July 2008.
