= Mozart in popular culture =

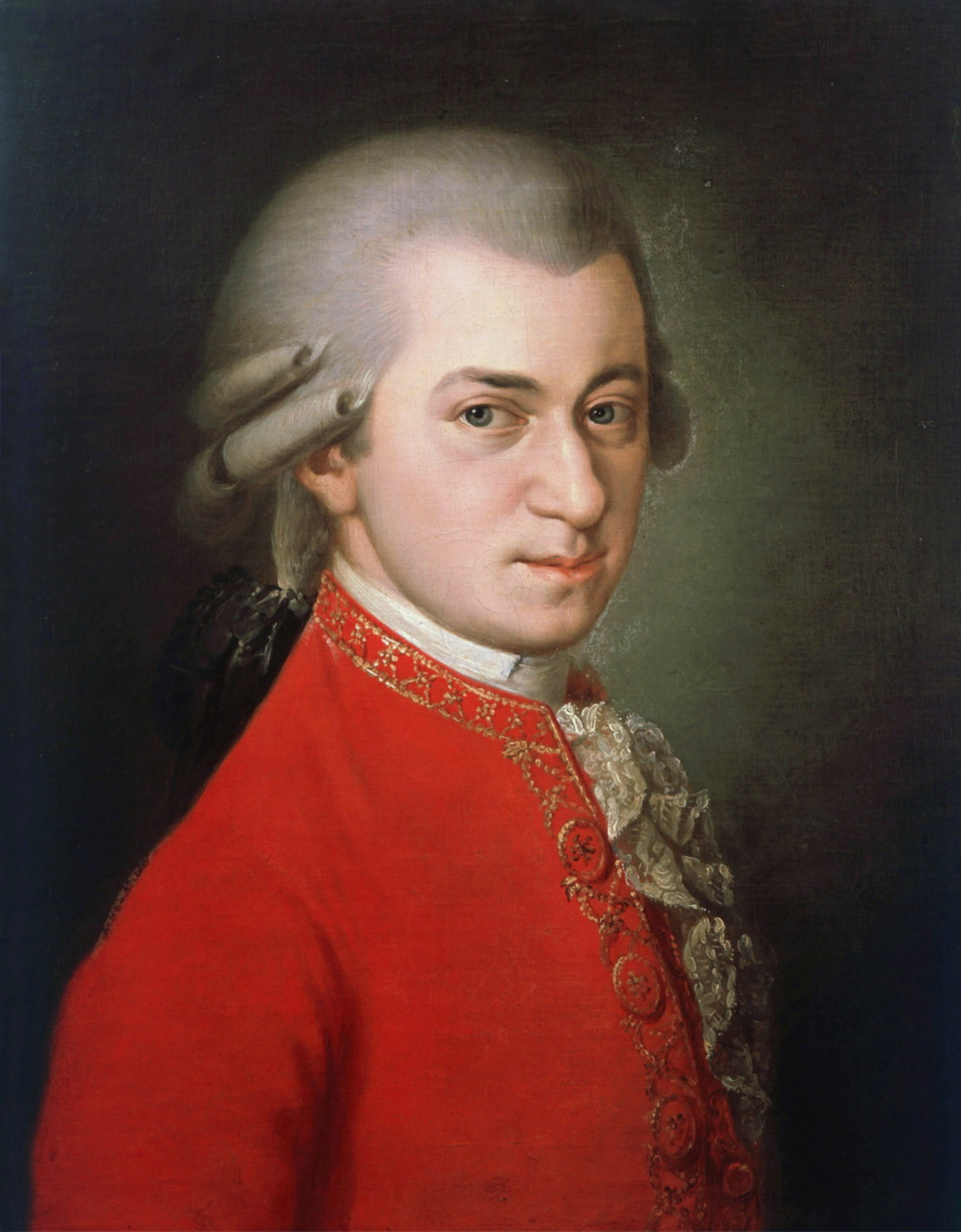
Krafft's posthumous 1819 Mozart portrait

The composer Wolfgang Amadeus Mozart (1756–1791) led a life that was dramatic in many respects, including his career as a child prodigy, his struggles to achieve personal independence and establish a career, his brushes with financial disaster, and his death in the course of attempting to complete his Requiem. Authors of fictional works have found his life a compelling source of raw material. Such works have included novels, plays, operas, and films. The listing below include only some prominent items from among thousands.

== Fiction ==
- Don Juan in 1812, by E. T. A. Hoffmann. Hoffmann also played an important role in establish the critical reputation of Mozart's music.
- Eduard Mörike. Mozart's Journey to Prague (1856).
- Mozart appears in Hermann Hesse's novels Der Steppenwolf and Die Morgenlandfahrt.
- In 1968, David Weiss published Sacred and profane: a novel of the life and times of Mozart, a narrative account on the composer's life drawing heavily on the documented historical record, but with invented conversations and other details.
- Mozart appears as a key character in the 1985 cyberpunk story "Mozart in Mirrorshades" by Bruce Sterling and Lewis Shiner, available in the anthology Mirrorshades from 1986 (originally published in Omni magazine).

== Drama ==
- Alexander Pushkin's play Mozart and Salieri is based on the supposed rivalry between Mozart and Antonio Salieri, particularly the idea that it was poison received from the latter that caused Mozart's death. This idea is not supported by modern scholarship. Pushkin's play was in turn made the basis of the opera Mozart and Salieri (1897) by Nikolai Rimsky-Korsakov.
- Peter Shaffer's 1979 play Amadeus focuses on the difference between true and sublime genius (Mozart) and mere high-quality craftsmanship (Salieri). Shaffer seems to have been especially taken by the contrast between Mozart's enjoyment of vulgarity (for which historical evidence exists, in the form of his letters to his cousin) and the sublime character of his music.

== Film ==
- Mozart's operas have been filmed a number of times; of these efforts the most celebrated has been Ingmar Bergman's 1975 version of The Magic Flute.
- Mozart's music has been used as background music for a great many films. Perhaps the most conspicuous example was the 1967 film Elvira Madigan, which repeated, over and over, a passage from the slow movement of the Piano concerto K. 467. It became conspicuous in the popular imagination, leading the concerto to be advertised for purposes of concerts and recordings as the "Elvira Madigan" concerto; the practice has gradually receded.
- The 1984 film Amadeus, directed by Miloš Forman, based on Peter Shaffer's 1979 play. The film starred Tom Hulce as Mozart, and won more than 40 awards, including 8 Academy Awards, including Best Picture, Best Directing (Forman), Best Actor in a Leading Role F. Murray Abraham as Antonio Salieri), and Best Adapted Screenplay (Shaffer). It also won four BAFTA awards, four Golden Globe awards, and in 2019 was selected for preservation in the United States National Film Registry by the Library of Congress as being "culturally, historically, or aesthetically significant".

== Music ==
- Peter Schickele, in his P. D. Q. Bach persona, paid 'tribute' to Mozart in several pieces, most notably "Ein Kleines Nachtsmusik" and "A Little Nightmare Music", the latter offering a humorous retelling of Mozart's conflicts with Salieri.

== Television ==
- The 13-part 1991 documentary series Mozart on Tour details Mozart's travels and how they influenced his music.
- The 2004 BBC three-part television series The Genius of Mozart by James Kent told parts of Mozart's life.
- The 2024 BBC Two three-part television series Mozart: Rise of a Genius, narrated by Juliet Stevenson, tells the story of Mozart's life through his and his family's letters, interviews, re-enactments and live performances.
- The 2025 British limited series Amadeus, adapted by Joe Barton from the 1979 Peter Schaffer play. The five-episode series stars Will Sharpe as Mozart and Paul Bettany as Salieri.

== Works cited ==
=== Biographic ===
- Solomon, Maynard (1996). Mozart: A Life (1st ed.). New York: Harper Perennial. ISBN 0-06-092692-9. OCLC 34162413.

=== Mozart in fiction ===
- Hesse, Hermann (1974). Der Steppenwolf: Erzählung. Suhrkamp Taschenbuch, 175 (in German). Frankfurt: Suhrkamp Verlag. ISBN 978-3-518-36675-2. OCLC 29769128.
- Hoffmann, E. T. A. (1814). "Don Juan". Fantasiestücke in Callot's Manier (in German). Bamberg: Kunz.
- Mörike, Eduard (1856). Mozart auf der Reise nach Prag (in German) (2nd ed.). J. G. Cotte.
- Pushkin, Alexander (1830). "Motsart i Salyeri". Malenkie tragedii (in Russian).
- Shaffer, Peter (1981). Amadeus (1st ed.). New York: Harper & Row. ISBN 978-0-06-014032-8. OCLC 6791087.
- Weiss, David (1970). Sacred and Profane: A Novel of the Life and Times of Mozart. London: Hodder Paperbacks. ISBN 978-0-340-12803-9. OCLC 26290980.
