= Mozart on Tour =

- Genre: Documentary
- Directed by: Robin Lough (documentary) János S. Darvas (piano concertos)
- Starring: André Previn; Michael Kitchen
- Opening theme: Rondo from Piano Concerto No. 9 (Jeunehomme) in E-flat major, K. 271
- Composer: Wolfgang Amadeus Mozart
- Original language: English
- No. of seasons: 1
- No. of episodes: 13

Production
- Producer: Bernd Hellthaler
- Running time: 57 minutes
- Production companies: DEWE-Hellthaler OHG, Berlin

Original release
- Network: PBS (United States)
- Release: 1991

Mozart on Tour is a 1991 documentary about the life and music of Wolfgang Amadeus Mozart (1756–1791) that focuses on his travels and how his music developed through them.

== Cast ==
- André Previn...Host and narrator
- Michael Kitchen...Reader of Mozart′s letters

== Synopsis ==
Wolfgang Amadeus Mozart spent a third of his life travelling, and Mozart on Tour focuses on these journeys and their influence on his life and work, highlighting a piano concerto that demonstrates his musical development at the time of each trip.

The first half of each episode of Mozart on Tour is a documentary hosted by André Previn, who provides a narrative in an even and subdued tone describing a journey Mozart made, emphasizing its influence on his musical development and events in his personal and professional life. The documentary includes footage of historic sites relevant to Mozart′s journey as they appeared when the documentary was filmed, actors in period costume portraying – without dialogue – events Previn describes, and musicians performing portions of Mozart′s compositions. Actor Michael Kitchen appears frequently, seated and dressed casually in modern clothing, to recite portions of Mozart′s letters directly to the camera in a conversational tone, while other actors provide uncredited off-camera readings of letters by other people in Mozart′s life. The second half of each episode is devoted to the complete performance in concert of a Mozart piano concerto – in one episode to two early piano concertos – related to the journey described in the episode.

== Production ==
Mozart on Tour was produced to coincide with the 1991 bicentennial of Mozart′s death. The entire 13-part series was broadcast in Europe, while in the United States a two-hour version of the series aired as a single episode on PBS in December 1991.

== Episodes ==
No.	Title	Directed by	Written by	Original release date
1	"London: The First Journey"	TBD	TBD	1991
DOCUMENTARY SEGMENT: During his childhood, Mozart and his family visited London from April 1764 to July 1765. It was a happy and successful visit in which the court of King George III idolized him and his family and Mozart met and associated with some of the most important musicians of the time. Among them were Johann Christian Bach (1735–1782) and Karl Friedrich Abel (1723–1787), both of whom had spent a significant amount of time in Italy and were influenced by musical developments there. The Mozart family also became friendly with Giovanni Manzuoli (1720–1782), an Italian vocalist residing and performing in London at the time, and became familiar with his style of virtuoso singing. Bach, Abel, and Manzuoli gave Mozart first-hand exposure to the Italian musical style (which would influence him for the rest of his life), the Italian school of musical composition, and the pianoforte, a fairly new instrument at the time. These experiences inspired Mozart's style, which culminated in works like 1782′s Piano Concerto No. 12 in A Major. CONCERT SEGMENT: Piano Concerto No. 12 in A Major, performed by the Royal Philharmonic Orchestra with soloist and conductor Vladimir Ashkenazy. Recorded in the Great Hall of Lancaster House at Hampton Court Palace, London.
2	"Mantua: Initial Steps"	TBD	TBD	1991
DOCUMENTARY SEGMENT: In December 1769, Leopold Mozart (1719–1787) set out with his son Wolfgang on a journey to Italy, the center of European musical culture at the time, to further Wolfgang′s musical development and his fame as a performer. In early 1770, they visited first Verona and then Mantua, and in both cities Wolfgang′s performances drew large and enthusiastic crowds. Wolfgang composed his first string quartet, String Quartet No. 1 in G major, K. 80/73f, during this journey. By this time, Wolfgang, with help from Leopold, already had begun to compose and perform early piano concerti – pasticcio arrangements for piano and orchestra based on piano sonatas by other composers. Music performed during the documentary includes a portion of Piano Concerto No. 1 in F Major, K. 37 performed by the Orchestra della Radiotelevisione della Svizzera Italiana ("Radio and Television Orchestra of Italian Switzerland") conducted by Marc Andreae with soloist Heidrun Holtmann. CONCERT SEGMENT: Piano Concerto No. 1 in F Major, K. 37 and Piano Concerto No. 4 in G major, K. 41, performed by the Orchestra della Radiotelevisione della Svizzera Italiana ("Radio and Television Orchestra of Italian Switzerland") conducted by Marc Andreae with soloist Heidrun Holtmann, recorded in the Teatro Scientifico del Bibiena ("Bibiena Scientific Theater") in Mantua, Italy, in 1989.
3	"Milan: Learning By Travelling"	TBD	TBD	1991
DOCUMENTARY SEGMENT: During the Mozart family′s tour of Italy, they visited Milan and Bologna in 1770, where Mozart wrote his opera Mitridate, re di Ponto, first performed in Milan in December 1770. At Bologna, Leopold Mozart arranged with Padre Giovanni Battista Martini, an instructor at the city′s renowned Accademia Filarmonica di Bologna ("Philharmonic Academy of Bologna") – which has educated many of the greatest composers and musicians from Italy and elsewhere – for Wolfgang to take the entrance examination. Wolfgang was too young to attend the academy, but Leopold thought that the examination would be a good vehicle for him to demonstrate his talent. Wolfgang completed the examination in a remarkable 30 minutes and passed, although Martini bent the rules of the examination and "corrected" the leading voice Mozart had written to conform to more established compositional norms. Music performed during the documentary includes portions of Divertimento No. 1 in E-flat major, K. 113, by the Chamber Ensemble of the National Theater, Prague, and Aria, K. 73, by Hana Zachatová and the Chamber Ensemble of the National Theater, Prague. CONCERT SEGMENT: Piano Concerto No. 5 in D major, K. 175, performed by the Orchestra della Radiotelevisione della Svizzera Italiana ("Radio and Television Orchestra of Italian Switzerland") conducted by Marc Andreae with soloist Malcolm Frager, recorded in the Teatro Scientifico del Bibiena in Mantua, Italy. The piece is Mozart′s first fully original piano concerto.
4	"Mannheim: Aloysia and Constanze"	TBD	TBD	1991
DOCUMENTARY SEGMENT: Mozart arrived in Mannheim in 1777 to seek a position in the court of the Elector of Bavaria Charles IV Theodore (1724–1799). He spent a year there, encountering the Mannheim school of composers and orchestral techniques, and the school had a major influence on his future compositions. In Mannheim, he met the music copyist Franz Fridolin Weber (1691–1754) and his four daughters. Mozart fell in love with Weber′s second-oldest child, the soprano Aloysia Weber (c. 1760–1839). Weber′s oldest child, the soprano Josepha Weber (1758–1819), later created the role of the Queen of the Night in Mozart′s 1791 opera The Magic Flute. Weber′s third child, soprano Constanze Weber (1762–1842), later became Mozart's wife. Mozart also met the conductor of the Mannheim orchestra, Christian Cannabich (c. 1731–1798), who greatly impressed him, and he composed for Cannabich′s daughter Rose. Music performed during the documentary includes portions of Sonata No. 22 for Violin and Piano, K. 293d, by Jitka Nováková (violin) and František Kúda (piano) and Symphony No. 31 in D Major "Paris", K. 297, by the Mozarteum Orchestra Salzburg conducted by Jeffrey Tate. CONCERT SEGMENT: Piano Concerto No. 6 in B Major, K. 238, performed by Christian Zacharias with the Stuttgart Radio Symphony Orchestra, conducted by Gianluigi Gelmetti, recorded in the Rokokotheater ("Rococo Theater") at Schwetzingen Palace in Schwetzingen, Germany, where Charles Theodore’s court spent a great deal of time during Mozart′s stay in Mannheim.
5	"Schwetzingen: Musicians and Princess"	TBD	TBD	1991
DOCUMENTARY SEGMENT: Mozart arrived in Mannheim in October 1777, hoping to become court composer to the Elector of Bavaria, Charles IV Theodore (1724–1799); under Charles Theodore, Mannheim and Schwetzingen, where Charles Theodore maintained a country palace, had become important European artistic and cultural centers. Travelling without his father Leopold, it was the first time in Mozart′s life that he had sought employment and artistic recognition on his own. He pursued a permanent paid position at court without success, in no small part because of his lack of diplomacy and diffidence. While awaiting a chance to secure full-time employment, he tried to meet expenses by composing music and giving music lessons, including for the elector's second family by his deceased mistress. He used his Piano Concert No. 8 in C Major, K. 246, in teaching his students. Music performed during the documentary includes portions of The Flute Quartet No. 1 in D major, K. 285, by Hana Huberná (flute) and members of the Talich Quartet and Piano Concert No. 8 in C Major, K. 246, by Christian Zacharias and the Stuttgart Radio Symphony Orchestra conducted by Gianluigi Gelmetti. CONCERT SEGMENT: Piano Concert No. 8 in C Major K. 246, performed by Christian Zacharias with the Stuttgart Radio Symphony Orchestra, conducted by Gianluigi Gelmetti, recorded in the Rokokotheater ("Rococo Theater") at Schwetzingen Palace in Schwetzingen, Germany, where Charles Theodore’s court spent a great deal of time during Mozart′s stay.
6	"Paris: Far from Salzburg"	TBD	TBD	1991
DOCUMENTARY SEGMENT: Mozart disliked his birthplace and childhood home, Salzburg, and found it humiliating to make music for the Archbishop of Salzburg, Count Hieronymus von Colloredo. After a prominent French pianist named Mademoiselle Jeunehomme – her first name is not recorded – visited Salzburg and performed some of Wolfgang's works, he and his family decided that he should visit Paris. When Mozart wrote the Archbishop and diplomatically requested that he grant Mozart a leave of absence so that he could travel and seek other opportunities, the Archbishop responded by firing Mozart, so Mozart and his mother set out for Mannheim, where they stayed for four months, and then moved on to Paris, arriving there in March 1778. In Paris, he received few job offers and turned down the ones he did receive. On 3 July 1778, his mother died in Paris. Mozart returned to Salzburg with no job and large debts, never to return to France. Although he viewed himself as a failure during this period of his life, it was a fruitful time in terms of his musical compositions. CONCERT SEGMENT: Piano Concerto No. 9 in E-flat major, "Jeunehomme," K. 271, performed by Mitsuko Uchida with the Mozarteum Orchestra Salzburg conducted by Jeffrey Tate, recorded at the Mozarteum University of Salzburg during the Salzburg Festival in 1989.
7	"Vienna: A Double Abduction"	TBD	TBD	1991
DOCUMENTARY SEGMENT: After the death of Empress Maria Theresa in November 1780, Archbishop Colloredo ordered Mozart to accompany him and his retinue to Vienna in 1781 for the official mourning period. Resolved to stay in Vienna and chafing at the archbishop′s treatment of him, Mozart resigned from his service — at the archbishop′s request and against his father Leopold′s wishes — while in Vienna. While giving music lessons in Vienna, Mozart met the Webers, who had moved there from Mannheim after the death of their father Fridolin. By the summer of 1782, Mozart was in love with Constanze Weber, but needed money to marry her, get her away from her mother, and set up his own household with her. Mozart composed the opera buffa The Abduction from the Seraglio in 1782, and used the money he earned from it to "rescue" Constanze from her mother′s household. Music performed during the documentary includes portions of Piano Concerto No. 17 in G major, K. 453 performed by Dezső Ránki with the English Chamber Orchestra conducted by Jeffrey Tate; The Abduction from the Seraglio by Dénes Gulyás (as Belmonte) and the Symphony Orchestra of the Hungarian Radio and Television, Budapest, conducted by Wilhelm Keitel; and Sonata for Violin and Piano, K. 371, by Jitka Nováková (violin) and František Kúda (piano). CONCERT SEGMENT: Piano Concerto No. 17 in G major, K. 453, performed by Dezső Ránki with the English Chamber Orchestra conducted by Jeffrey Tate, recorded in the Grosse Galerie ("Great Gallery") at Schönbrunn Palace in Vienna, Austria.
8	"Vienna: The Best City for My Métier"	TBD	TBD	1991
DOCUMENTARY SEGMENT: Mozart enjoyed life in Vienna and never returned to Salzburg after a three-month stay there to visit his father Leopold in 1783. For his part, Leopold viewed Wolfgang′s lifestyle in Vienna as frivolous, and made his distaste known. But by the years from 1783 to 1785, Wolfgang had become history′s first successful freelance composer, and made a comfortable living from his compositions and performances. He enhanced his reputation by taking part in a number of large-scale concert events in Vienna known as musical "academies," each of which centered around the works of a featured composer. Wolfgang befriended Joseph Haydn (1732–1809), celebrated by his contemporaries as the greatest composer of his time, and during a visit Leopold made to Vienna in 1785, Haydn thanked Leopold for his contribution to the musical education of Wolfgang, who Haydn said was the greatest composer he had ever known, leading to a warming of relations between Wolfgang and Leopold. Wolfgang often performed piano works by sight-reading them at their premiere without rehearsal, and his piano works from this period provide insight into his talent and skill as a performer. Music performed during the documentary includes portions of Piano Concerto No. 20 in D minor, K. 466 performed by Ivan Klánský with the Virtuosi di Praga conducted by Jiří Bělohlávek; the Great Mass in C minor, K. 427 performed by soprano Andrea Rost with the Bach-Collegium Stuttgart conducted by Helmuth Rilling; and String Quartet No. 19, K. 465 performed by the Talich Quartet. CONCERT SEGMENT: Piano Concerto No. 20 in D minor, K. 466, with cadenzas by Ivan Klánský, performed by Ivan Klánský with the Virtuosi di Praga conducted by Jiří Bělohlávek, recorded in the Rittersaal ("Knight's Hall") of the Wallenstein Palace in Prague, Czechoslovakia.
9	"Vienna and Prague: The Other Side of the Coin"	TBD	TBD	1991
DOCUMENTARY SEGMENT: In Vienna in 1786, Mozart composed the opera buffa The Marriage of Figaro. Mozart and his librettist, Lorenzo da Ponte (1749–1838), based it on a satirical political play by Pierre-Augustin Caron de Beaumarchais (1732–1799) which was banned in the Austrian Empire. Although not as politically charged as Beaumarchais's work, The Marriage of Figaro nonetheless satirized the aristocracy and their relationships with their servants. It also broke new ground in opera in its three-dimensional treatment of its characters, its exploration of their sexual attractions to one another, and in its use and style of music, which departed from previous operatic conventions in many ways. Thanks to these qualities and to the palace intrigue and social politics that tended to determine musical success or failure in Vienna, the opera premiered in Vienna on 1 May 1786 but closed after only nine performances, receiving a mixed reception. Shortly after its premiere, however, connoisseurs of music in Prague invited Mozart to attend a performance of the opera in Prague, where it premiered in December 1786. In Prague, The Marriage of Figaro achieved tremendous success. In 1789, The Marriage of Figaro was revived in Vienna, cementing its place in the Mozart repertoire. Music performed during the documentary includes portions of Piano Concerto No. 24 in C minor, K. 491 – which Mozart composed in 1786, a few weeks before the world premiere of The Marriage of Figaro – performed by André Previn with the Royal Philharmonic Orchestra conducted by Previn; The Marriage of Figaro by István Gáti (as Figaro); Der Schauspieldirektor ("The Impresario"), K. 486, by István Rozsos (as Buff), Ingrid Kertesi (as Madame Herz), and Katalin Farkas (as Madame Silberklang); and Antonio Salieri′s (1750–1825) Prima la musica e poi le parole ("First the music and then the words") by Mária Zempeléni (as Tonina) with the Symphony Orchestra of the Hungarian Radio and Television conducted by Wilhelm Keitel. CONCERT SEGMENT: Piano Concerto No. 24 in C minor, K. 491 with cadenzas by André Previn, performed by André Previn with the Royal Philharmonic Orchestra conducted by Previn, recorded in the Grosse Galerie ("Great Gallery") at Schönbrunn Palace in Vienna, Austria.
10	"Prague: Success with Da Ponte"	TBD	TBD	1991
DOCUMENTARY SEGMENT: In 1787, Mozart received an invitation to Prague to conduct his opera buffa The Marriage of Figaro. The opera was a smash hit in Prague, and led to Mozart receiving a commission to compose the music for his opera Don Giovanni to a libretto by Lorenzo da Ponte (1749–1838). Music performed during the documentary includes portions of Symphony No. 38 in D major "Prague," K. 504, by the Deutsche Kammerphilharmonie Bremen ("Bremen German Chamber Philharmonic") conducted by Gerd Albrecht; Don Giovanni, K. 427, by István Gáli (as Don Giovanni), Zsuzsanna Dénes (as Donna Anna), László Polgár (as Leporello), and the Symphony Orchestra of the Hungarian Radio and Television conducted by Wilhelm Keitel; Piano Quartet No. 1 in G minor, K. 478, by the Ars Quartet; and 6 German Dances, K. 509, by the Chamber Ensemble of the National Theatre, Prague. CONCERT SEGMENT: Piano Concerto No. 23 in A major, K. 488, performed by Zoltán Kocsis with the Virtuosi di Praga conducted by Jiří Bělohlávek, recorded in the Rittersaal ("Knight′s Hall") of the Wallenstein Palace in Prague, Czechoslovakia.
11	"Frankfurt: Coronation"	TBD	TBD	1991
DOCUMENTARY SEGMENT: Austria's Emperor Leopold II traveled to Frankfurt-am-Main in early October 1790 to be crowned Holy Roman Emperor. Left out of the Viennese court's official delegation, Mozart paid his own way to travel to Frankfurt-am-Main in the hope of making money by performing concerts. However, he was left out of the musical activities related to the coronation entirely, and instead of Mozart receiving a commission for an opera, the opera Axur, re d'Ormus by Antonio Salieri (1750–1825) was performed as part of the coronation festivities. By the time of the coronation ceremony on 9 October 1790, Mozart had done little to compose new music or make professional contacts among the dignitaries attending the festivities. In the end, Mozart finally gave a concert on 15 October 1790, after the newly crowned emperor and most other officials had left the city. The concert, which included performances of Piano Concerto No. 19 in F major, K. 459, and Piano Concerto No. 26 in D major "Coronation," K. 537, was not a commercial success. Music performed during the documentary includes portions of Piano Concerto No. 19 by Radu Lupu with the Deutsche Kammerphilharmonie Bremen ("Bremen German Chamber Philharmonic") conducted by David Zinman; Piano Concerto No. 26 with cadenzas by Edwin Fischer, performed by Homero Francesch with the Deutsche Kammerphilharmonie Bremen conducted by Gerd Albrecht; and Antonio Salieri′s opera Tarare with Anna Caleb as Spinette,Jean Pierre Lafont as Atar, and the Radiosinfonieorchester Stuttgart ("Stuttgart Radio Symphony Orchestra") conducted by Jean-Claude Malgoire. CONCERT SEGMENT: Piano Concerto No. 19 in F major, K. 459, performed by Radu Lupu with the Deutsche Kammerphilharmonie Bremen ("Bremen German Chamber Philharmonic") conducted by David Zinman, recorded in the Sophiensaal in Munich, Germany.
12	"Munich: Way Station"	TBD	TBD	1991
DOCUMENTARY SEGMENT: Munich usually was the first large city Mozart passed through on his journeys and thus served as a way station for him, and his piano performances and works always were popular there. By 1790, Mozart had visited Munich eight times but had never secured steady employment there. Munich saw important performances of many of Mozart′s works, including the world première of his 1775 opera La finta giardiniera ("The Pretend Garden-Girl") and of his 1781 opera seria Idomeneo. He played his 1788 Piano Concerto No. 26 in D major "Coronation," K. 537, at the coronation of Leopold II as Holy Roman Emperor in Frankfurt-am-Main in September 1790 and played it for the King of Naples, Ferdinand IV (1751–1825) in Munich on his way home. A noteworthy aspect of the written version of the concerto is that it does not contain all the notes of the solo part, preventing dishonest copyists from distributing the work without proper payment. In many of his piano works, Mozart expected pianists to understand what he wanted them to play from a musical sketch which required them to improvise the necessary harmonies, sometimes by sight. To this day, the "Coronation" concerto is played in this way, sometimes using cadenzas recommended by the composer or other authorities and sometimes with the individual pianist using his or her own interpretation. Music performed during the documentary includes portions of La finta giardiniera by members of the Choir of the Hungarian National Opera, Budapest, and the Symphony Orchestra of the Hungarian Radio and Television, Budpaest, conducted by Wilhelm Keitel, and of Divertimento No. 15, K. 287, by the Chamber Ensemble of the National Theatre, Prague. CONCERT SEGMENT: Piano Concerto No. 26 in D major "Coronation," K. 537 with cadenzas by Edwin Fischer, performed by Homero Francesch with the Deutsche Kammerphilharmonie Bremen ("Bremen German Chamber Philharmonic") conducted by Gerd Albrecht, recorded in the Christian Zaiss Saal ("Christian Zeiss Hall") in Wiesbaden, Germany.
13	"Vienna: The Last Year"	TBD	TBD	1991
DOCUMENTARY SEGMENT: Between 1788 and 1790, Mozart and his wife Constanze suffered from precarious finances and the tragedy of the death of young children; only two of the five children born to them during their eight-year marriage lived to adulthood. With Constanze in fragile health from her pregnancies and taking the waters at Baden, Mozart spent 1791 – the final year of his short life – in Vienna, working to make ends meet. Spending on the arts there had declined, but Mozart earned enough to stabilize his family′s financial situation, although it remained precarious. With his own health in decline, visiting Constanze in Baden every weekend, Mozart wrote some solemn works during the year, such as the Requiem Mass in D minor, K. 626, which he never finished; it was performed at his funeral. But he also wrote lighthearted music, such the fairy-tale opera The Magic Flute, and his final piano concerto, Piano Concerto No. 27 in B-flat major, K. 595, an uplifting work that used the same melody as a children's song about a little boy wishing for the coming of spring. Music performed during the documentary includes portions of The Magic Flute by László Polgár (as Papageno), Ibolya Verebics (as Pamina), and the Symphony Orchestra of the Hungarian Radio and Television, Budpaest, conducted by Wilhelm Keitel; of the Quintet in A major for Clarinet and Strings, K. 581, by Otokar Bretšneider (clarinet) and members of the Talich Quartet; and of Piano Concert No. 27 by Aleksandar Madžar. CONCERT SEGMENT: Piano Concerto No. 27 in B-flat major, K. 595, performed by Aleksandar Madžar with the Royal Philharmonic Orchestra conducted by André Previn, recorded in the Grosse Galerie ("Great Gallery") at Schönbrunn Palace in Vienna, Austria.
