= Caught on a Train =

British television play

Caught on a Train is a British television play written by Stephen Poliakoff and directed by Peter Duffell, based on an overnight train journey across Europe, and following the route of a journey that Poliakoff had himself made from London to Vienna. It was first shown, as part of the BBC2 Playhouse series, on 31 October 1980, and was re-shown in 2001, 2006 and 2026.

The play stars Dame Peggy Ashcroft as Frau Messner and Michael Kitchen as Peter, and the main supporting cast features Wendy Raebeck as Lorraine and Michael Sheard as Preston. The soundtrack was written by the jazz composer Mike Westbrook.

The play won a BAFTA Television Award and other plaudits in 1980.

Having previously been available on VHS, the play was released on DVD by BBC Worldwide in 2004, with an audio commentary by Poliakoff and the producer, Kenith Trodd.
