= The Last Contract =

- The Last Contract British DVD cover
- Directed by: Kjell Sundvall
- Written by: John W. Grow; Mats Arehn
- Produced by: Börje Hansson
- Starring: Michael Kitchen; Mikael Persbrandt; Pernilla August
- Release date: 6 March 1998
- Running time: 107 minutes
- Country: Sweden
- Languages: Swedish; English

The Last Contract (Swedish: Sista kontraktet) is a 1998 Swedish thriller film directed by Kjell Sundvall. It is a work of fiction about the circumstances surrounding the actual murder of the Swedish Social Democratic Prime Minister Olof Palme on 28 February 1986. A Swedish police officer (played by Mikael Persbrandt) discovers the plan to assassinate Palme and tries to prevent it. The film also stars Pernilla August, Reine Brynolfsson and Cecilia Ljung.

The film is based on a novel by an anonymous writer, who used the pseudonym "John W. Grow", which suggests that a British professional assassin (played by Michael Kitchen) was hired to kill Olof Palme.

== Plot ==
The film suggests that a British professional hit-man was hired by the CIA to assassinate the Swedish Prime Minister Olof Palme, because of Palme's stance on nuclear weapons in Scandinavia. The hit-man (Michael Kitchen) works for money alone and is very careful. He finds a Norwegian man (Bjørn Floberg) that hates the Swedish P.M. He also sets up a man to become a scapegoat (this character is Christer Pettersson, first convicted (by a disagreeing court (Note: Swedish courts don't use a jury, but the professional judge and three politically appointed so called "nämndemän", the judge didn't appreciate the prosecutor's proof, but the three "nämndemän" did)) of the real assassination, but later acquitted in the appealing court (Note: Swedish appeal courts don't use a jury, but three professional judges and two politically appointed so called "nämndemän", the appeal court's acquittal was unanimous)). The Norwegian man kills Palme just as his wife notices Christer Pettersson. Soon afterwards the hitman kills the killer, and all traces pointing to the professional hitman are gone.

== Cast ==
- Mikael Persbrandt ... Roger Nyman, the secret police
- Michael Kitchen ... John Gales alias Ray Lambert, the professional who assassinates the hit-man in order to clean up.
- Pernilla August ... Nina Nyman, Roger Nyman's wife
- Reine Brynolfsson ... Bo Ekman, police officer and Roger Nyman's best friend
- Bjørn Floberg ... Tom Nielsen, the Palme assassin, who is then killed himself by John Gales alias Ray Lambert.
- Jacqueline Ramel ... Helene Salonen, of the secret police
- Cecilia Ljung ... Lisa Holmgren, journalist
- Joakim Forslund ... Markus Nyman, Roger's child
- Julia Brådhe-Dehnisch ... Josefin Nyman (as Julia Dehnisch)
- Agnes Granberg ... Sara Nyman, Roger's child
- Johan Lindell ... Bernhard Lange, of the secret police
- Mathias Henrikson ... Peter Bark
- Donald Högberg ... Appelqvist, of the secret police
- Per Ragnar ... kg, of the secret police
- Paul Birchard ... Bertram Norris
- Anders Ekborg ... Bengt Löfgren
- Leif Andrée ... Max Berg, the corrupt journalist
- Ola Isedal ... Karl Larsson, the drug addict
- Stephen Webber ... Wilson, the American
- Stig Engström ... Bartender at the press club
- Emil Forselius ... The Robber
- Claudia Galli ... Shop Assistant
- Tshamano Sebe ... Ery Sontanga, the African
- Faith Maqoqa ... Judy Sontanga, the African
- Bankole Omotoso ... Luwamba
- Dipuo Huma ... Lambert's cleaning lady
- Stephan Karlsén ... Arkivman
- Sven-Åke Wahlström ... Palmehatare
- Lasse Petterson ... Palmehatare
- Berndt Östman ... Portier (as Bernt Östman)
- Roger S. Karlsson ... Guard
- Bo Bertil Lundqvist ... Statsministern
