= The Bob Newhart Show =

American television sitcom (1972–1978)

- Created by: David Davis; Lorenzo Music
- Starring: Bob Newhart; Suzanne Pleshette; Peter Bonerz; Bill Daily; Marcia Wallace
- Theme music composer: Lorenzo Music; Henrietta Music
- Opening theme: "Home to Emily"
- Country of origin: United States
- Original language: English
- No. of seasons: 6
- No. of episodes: 142 (list of episodes)

Production
- Camera setup: Multi-camera
- Running time: 30 minutes
- Production company: MTM Enterprises

Original release
- Network: CBS
- Release: September 16, 1972 – April 1, 1978

Related
- Newhart

The Bob Newhart Show is an American television sitcom produced by MTM Enterprises that aired on CBS from September 16, 1972, to April 1, 1978, with a total of 142 half-hour episodes over six seasons. Comedian Bob Newhart portrays a psychologist whose interactions with his wife, friends, patients, and colleagues lead to humorous situations and dialogue. The show was filmed before a live audience.

== Premise ==
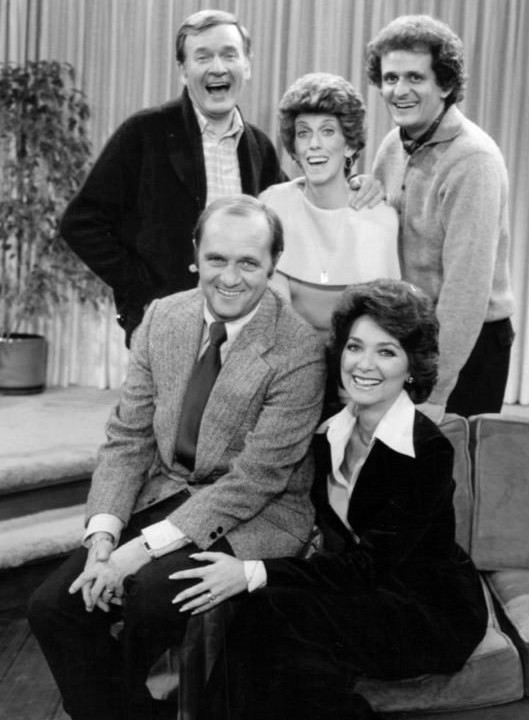
Standing, from left: Howard Borden, Carol Kester, Jerry Robinson; seated: Bob and Emily Hartley

The show centers on Robert "Bob" Hartley (Newhart), a Chicago psychologist, his work and home life, with his supportive, though occasionally sarcastic, wife Emily (Suzanne Pleshette), and their friendly but mildly pesky neighbor, airline navigator Howard Borden (Bill Daily). The medical building where Bob's practice is located also houses Jerry Robinson (Peter Bonerz), an orthodontist whose office is on the same floor, and their receptionist, Carol Kester (Marcia Wallace), as well as a number of other doctors who appear on the show occasionally.

Bob's three most frequently seen regular patients are cynical, mean-spirited and neurotic real-estate mogul Elliot Carlin (Jack Riley), milquetoast former US Marine cook Emil Peterson (John Fiedler), and quiet, reserved Lillian Bakerman (Florida Friebus), an older woman who spends most of her sessions knitting. Carlin was ranked 49th in TV Guide's List of the 50 Greatest TV Characters of All Time, and Riley reprised the character in guest appearances on both St. Elsewhere, ALF and Newhart.

Most of the situations involve Newhart's character playing straight man to his wife, colleagues, friends, and patients. A frequent running gag on the show is an extension of Newhart's stand-up comedy routines, where he played one side of a telephone conversation, the other side of which is not heard. In a nod to this, for the first two seasons, the episodes opened with Bob answering the telephone by saying "Hello?"

== Cast ==
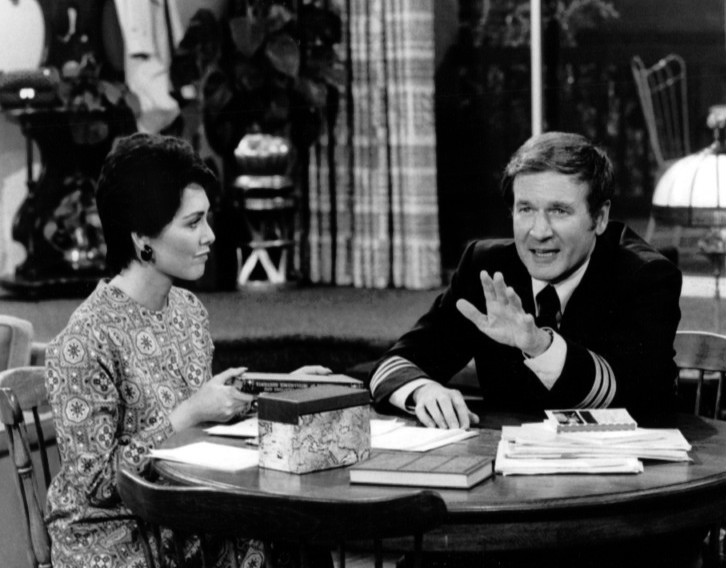
Emily listens to Howard in the Hartleys' apartment.

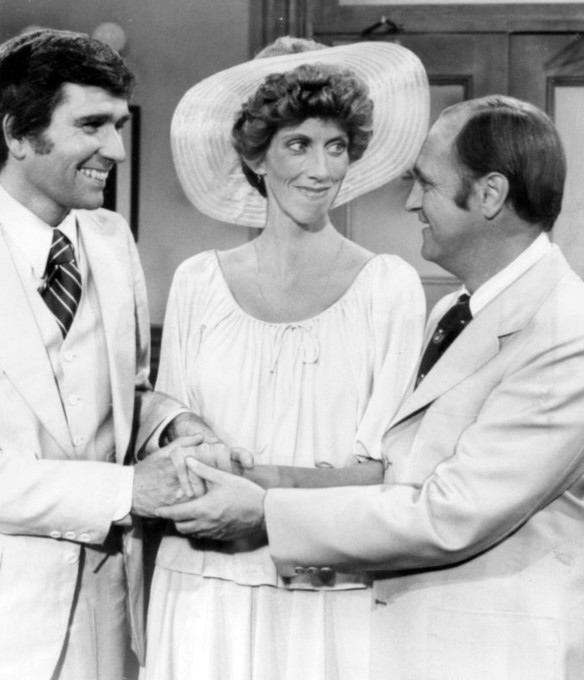
Bob (right) congratulates Carol and Larry Bondurant on their marriage.

=== Stars ===
- Bob Newhart as Dr. Robert Hartley, psychologist
- Suzanne Pleshette as Emily (née Harrison) Hartley, his wife, a school teacher and, later, assistant principal
- Peter Bonerz as Dr. Jerry Robinson, Bob's friend, an orthodontist
- Bill Daily as Howard Borden, Bob and Emily's next-door neighbor and friend, an airline navigator and later co-pilot
- Marcia Wallace as Carol Kester, Bob and Jerry's receptionist

=== Bob's patients ===
Seen on a recurring basis in group therapy sessions. Mr. Carlin, Mrs. Bakerman and Mr. Peterson were by far the most frequently seen patients.

- Jack Riley as Elliot F. Carlin
- Florida Friebus as Mrs. Lillian Bakerman
- John Fiedler as Emil Peterson
- Renée Lippin as Michelle Nardo (seasons 1–5)
- Oliver Clark as Ed Herd (seasons 2–6)
- Noam Pitlik as Victor Gianelli (seasons 1–2)
- Daniel J. Travanti as Victor Gianelli (season 3)
- Howard Hesseman as Craig Plager (seasons 2–6)
- Lucien Scott as Edgar T. Vickers (seasons 2–3)
- Merie Earle as Mrs. Loomis (seasons 2–3)
- Rhoda Gemignani as Joan Rossi (seasons 2–3)
- Michael Conrad as Mr. Trevesco (season 2)

Henry Winkler played patient Miles Lascoe in one season 2 episode.

=== Bob and Emily's relatives ===
Seen very occasionally, except for Bob's sister in seasons 2–4.

- Pat Finley as Ellen Hartley, Bob's sister (introduced near the end of season 2, and featured in nearly half of the episodes in season 3, the character was eventually dropped midway through season 4)
- Martha Scott as Martha Hartley, Bob and Ellen's mother
- Barnard Hughes as Herb Hartley, Bob and Ellen's father
- John Randolph as Cornelius "Junior" Harrison Jr., Emily's father
- Ann Rutherford as Aggie Harrison, Emily's mother

=== Neighbors, friends and others ===
Most of these were occasional or even one-shot characters.

- Patricia Smith as Margaret Hoover, Emily's friend (seen only in the first part of season 1, then dropped)
- Tom Poston as Cliff "The Peeper" Murdock, Bob's college friend from Vermont
- Jean Palmerton as Corrine Murdock, "The Peeper's" wife
- Moosie Drier as Howie Borden, Howard's son
- Will Mackenzie as Larry Bondurant, Carol's boyfriend and later husband
- Richard Schaal as Don Livingston (later Don Fesler), boyfriend/short-lived fiancé of Carol's; in the 1st season played Chuck Brock, husband of Nancy, who had previously been briefly engaged to Bob
- Mariette Hartley as Marilyn Dietz, downstairs neighbor and friend of Emily's
- Gail Strickland as Courtney Simpson, a girlfriend of Jerry's
- Raul Julia as Dr. Greg Robinson, Jerry's brother
- Heather Menzies as Debbie Borden, Howard's younger sister
- William Redfield as Howard's brother, Gordon Borden, the game warden; the actor also appeared in the pilot episode as Margaret's husband Arthur Hoover

=== Rimpau Medical Arts Center ===
Doctors Tupperman and Newman were recurring characters; the others were mostly one-shots.

- Larry Gelman as Dr. Bernie Tupperman, urologist
- Howard Platt as Dr. Phil Newman, cosmetic surgeon
- Shirley O'Hara as Debbie Flett, older, scatterbrained temp receptionist who constantly calls Bob "Dr. Ryan"
- Gene Blakely as Dr. Ralph Tetzi, Ear/Nose/Throat specialist
- Julie Payne as Dr. Sharon Rudell, who prefers "scream therapy" as a therapeutic device whenever she feels stressed
- Tom Lacy as Dr. Stan Whelan
- Paula Shaw as Dr. Tammy Ziegler
- Ellen Weston as Dr. Sarah Harris
- Kristina Holland as Gail Bronson, Carol's vacation replacement
- Phillip R. Allen as Dr. Frank Walburn, another psychologist
- Teri Garr as Miss Brennan, Dr. Walburn's receptionist

== Episodes ==
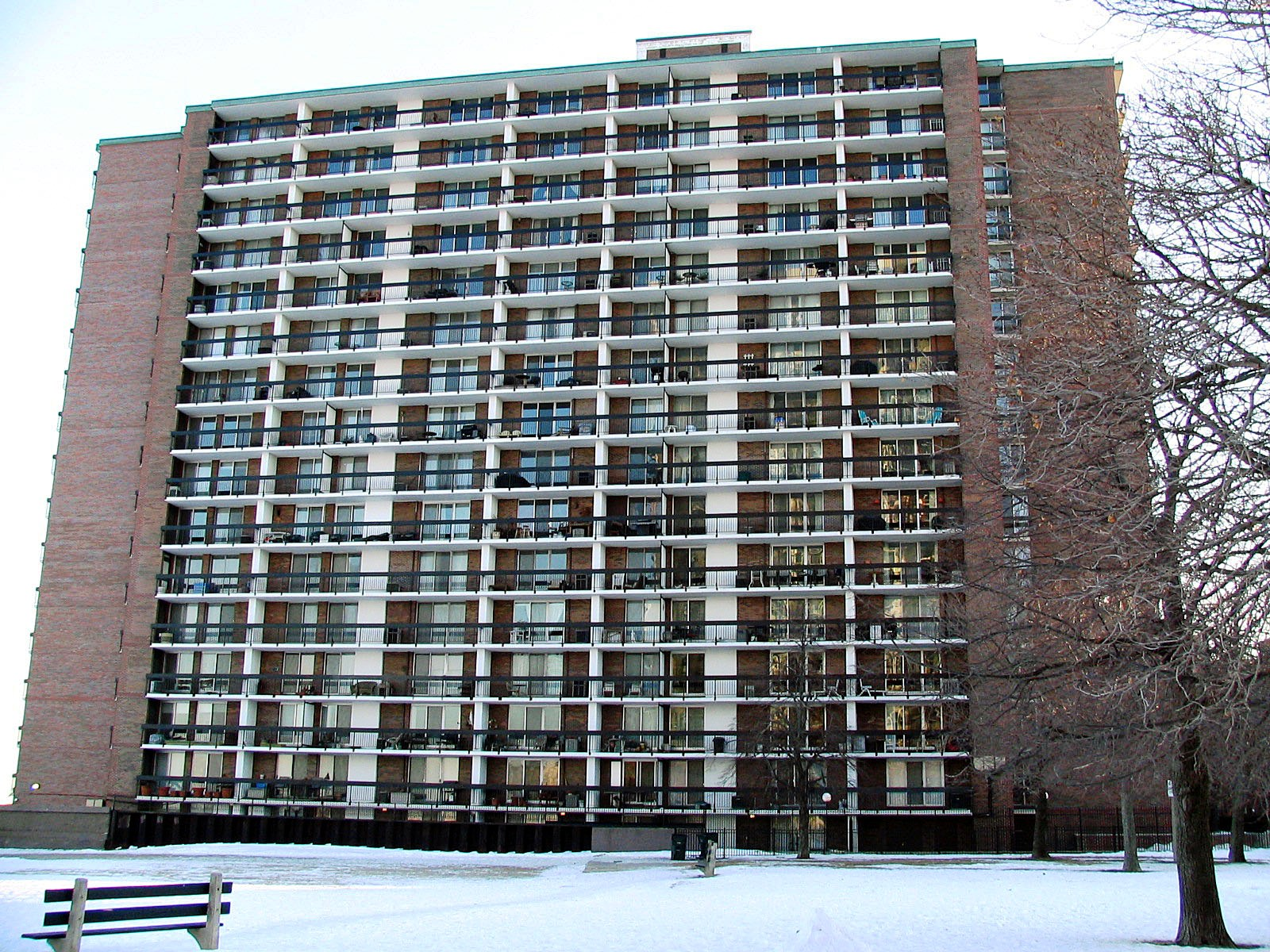
The Thorndale Beach North condominium, at 5901 N. Sheridan Road in Chicago's Edgewater community, was used for exterior establishing shots of the Hartleys' apartment building.

Season	Episodes	Originally released	
Season	Episodes	First released	Last released
1	24	September 16, 1972	March 10, 1973
2	24	September 15, 1973	March 2, 1974
3	24	September 14, 1974	March 8, 1975
4	24	September 13, 1975	February 28, 1976
5	24	September 25, 1976	March 19, 1977
6	22	September 24, 1977	April 1, 1978

The first four seasons of The Bob Newhart Show aired on Saturday nights at 9:30 p.m. Eastern Standard Time. During the winter of the 1976–77 season, the program moved to 8:30 p.m. EST. For its final season during 1977–78, the program moved to 8:00 p.m. EST.

The program typically aired following The Mary Tyler Moore Show, which was also produced by MTM Enterprises.

The show delivered strong ratings for CBS, remaining in the Top 40 of all series for the first 5 of its 6 seasons:

Season 1: #16
Season 2: #12
Season 3: #17
Season 4: #25
Season 5: #37
Season 6: #67

The credits feature the Cooper Black typeface, after it was made famous in 1966 by its use in the artwork for the Beach Boys' Pet Sounds album.

=== Finale ===
In the show's April Fools' Day final episode, "Happy Trails to You," Bob gives up his practice and accepts a teaching position at a small college in Oregon. In the closing scene, Bob, Emily, Jerry, Carol and Howard exchange tearful goodbyes and embrace; an emotional Emily bursts into an impromptu refrain of "Oklahoma," and the others join in (except for Howard, who does not know the words), a nod to The Mary Tyler Moore Show finale (also produced by MTM) from the previous year, in which the newsroom characters embraced and sang "It's a Long Way to Tipperary". The final credits show the cast of the episode in a curtain call.

== Awards and honors ==
In 1977, the show received two Emmy nominations – for "Outstanding Comedy Series" and for Pleshette for "Outstanding Continued Performance by an Actress in a Comedy Series". Newhart, himself, was nominated twice for a Golden Globe Award as "Best TV Actor—Musical/Comedy" in 1975 and 1976. In 1997, the episodes "Over the River and Through the Woods" and "Death Be My Destiny" were respectively ranked No. 9 and No. 50 on TV Guide's 100 Greatest Episodes of All Time. TV Guide's 50 Greatest TV Shows of All Time listed it as No. 44. In 2007, Time placed the show on its unranked list of "100 Best TV Shows of All-TIME". Bravo ranked Bob Hartley 84th on its list of the 100 greatest TV characters.

In 2004, TV Land commemorated the show with a statue of Newhart in character as Dr. Hartley, seated and facing an empty couch, as if conducting a therapy session in his office. The statue was temporarily installed in front of 430 North Michigan Avenue, the building used for exterior establishing shots of Hartley's office. The statue is now permanently located in the sculpture park adjacent to Chicago's Navy Pier entertainment complex. In 2005, the TV Land Awards honored The Bob Newhart Show with its Icon Award, presented by Ray Romano.

In 2013, TV Guide ranked the series No. 49 on its list of the 60 Best Series of All Time.

The City of Chicago renamed the section of Sheridan Road in front of the Thorndale Beach Condominiums, which served as the setting for the Hartleys’ residence, Bob Newhart Way in 2025.

== Later appearances by series characters ==
St. Elsewhere (1985)

Jack Riley reprised his Elliot Carlin role on a 1985 episode of St. Elsewhere and partnered with Oliver Clark as the amnesiac John Doe Number Six. Carlin and Doe have been committed to the hospital's mental ward, where Carlin treats Doe with the same verbal abuse he directed toward Clark's "Mr. Herd" on The Bob Newhart Show. Carlin blames his insanity on an unnamed "quack in Chicago." While Oliver Clark's recurring portrayal of John Doe Number Six is essentially identical to Mr. Herd, the two are never stated to be the same individual. In a nod to the Mary Tyler Moore Show, John Doe Number Six addresses a character played by Betty White as Sue Ann Nivens, which Betty White's character denies.

ALF (1987)

In the 1987 ALF episode entitled "Going Out of My Head Over You", Willie visits a psychologist, Dr. Lawrence "Larry" Dykstra, portrayed by Bill Daily. Jack Riley is in the waiting room, apparently portraying Elliot Carlin. Also in this episode, ALF mentions learning about psychology by watching episodes of The Bob Newhart Show.

Newhart (1988 and 1990)

Riley appears in a 1988 episode of Newhart, playing an unnamed character who acts very much like Mr. Carlin. This character is being treated by the same therapist in Vermont whom Dick Loudon (Bob Newhart) visits for marriage counseling. Dick feels he recognizes Riley's character, but cannot place his face; whereupon the unnamed patient insults him. Echoing Carlin's statement from the 1985 St. Elsewhere, the therapist apologizes for her patient, explaining that it has taken her "years to undo the damage caused by some quack in Chicago."

Tom Poston, who played Cliff "The Peeper" Murdock, Bob's college friend from Vermont, played "George" the resident handyman from Vermont, throughout the Newhart series. Poston and Suzanne Pleshette married in 2001, with the marriage lasting until Poston's death in 2007. Pleshette died the following year.

Newhart and Pleshette reprised their roles from the show for the 1990 finale of Newhart, in which it was revealed that the entire Newhart series had just been Bob Hartley's dream. Bob and Emily awake in a room identical in appearance to their Chicago bedroom from The Bob Newhart Show. (This plot device had previously been used in the season five finale ("You're Having My Hartley") in which Emily is pregnant. At the end, the pregnancy is revealed to have been a dream.)

The Bob Newhart Show: The 19th Anniversary Special (1991)

The entire cast assembled for the one-hour clip show The Bob Newhart Show: The 19th Anniversary Special in 1991, which finds the show's characters in the present day. This show is set in Chicago, in the same apartment and office that Bob Hartley had in his 1970s show. During the course of the show, the characters analyzed Bob's dream from the Newhart finale. At one point Howard recalled, "I had a dream like that once. I dreamed I was an astronaut in Florida for five years," as scenes from I Dream of Jeannie featuring Bill Daily as Roger Healey were shown.

Murphy Brown (1994)

Newhart played Bob Hartley on Murphy Brown, in the episode "Anything But Cured" (March 14, 1994) to beg Carol (Marcia Wallace reprising her role from The Bob Newhart Show) to leave her job as Murphy's secretary and come back with him to Chicago.

Saturday Night Live (1995)

Newhart reprised Hartley twice in the February 11, 1995, episode of Saturday Night Live. In one sketch, he appears on a satirical version of Ricki Lake, befuddled by Ms. Lake's dysfunctional guests and her armchair pop psychology. The episode ended with a repeat of Newhart’s "just a dream" scene, in which Bob Hartley again wakes up with Emily (Pleshette), and tells her that he just dreamed he had hosted SNL. Emily responds, "That show's not still on, is it?"

George and Leo (1997)

George and Leo was a sitcom starring Bob Newhart and Judd Hirsch, and a 1997 episode called "The Cameo Episode" featured a raft of cameo appearances by their co-stars of previous series. Although the actors were not necessarily playing the same characters as they played in the previous shows, there was certainly a suggestion with some of the unnamed characters that they could be. Amongst the Bob Newhart Show actors making cameos in the episode were Peter Bonerz (as "Dr. Robins"), Oliver Clark, Bill Daily (as a pilot), John Fiedler, Tom Poston (as a police officer), Jack Riley, and Marcia Wallace.

CBS at 75 (2002)

Newhart and Pleshette, as "The Hartleys," were the hosts of a segment of the CBS at 75 broadcast.

== Home media ==
20th Century Fox Home Entertainment released the first four seasons of The Bob Newhart Show on DVD in Region 1 in 2005/2006.

On February 3, 2014, Shout! Factory announced it had acquired the rights to the series. It subsequently released The Bob Newhart Show: The Complete Series on May 27, 2014. The fifth and sixth seasons were later released on DVD in individual sets on February 3, 2015.

DVD name	Ep #	Release date
The Complete 1st Season	24	April 12, 2005
The Complete 2nd Season	24	October 4, 2005
The Complete 3rd Season	24	April 11, 2006
The Complete 4th Season	24	September 5, 2006
The Complete 5th Season	24	February 3, 2015
The Complete 6th Season	22	February 3, 2015
The Complete Series	142	May 27, 2014

== In popular culture ==
Season 1 episode 7 of the 2019 Sci-fi alternate history series, For All Mankind, in which the USSR beats the United States to a crewed lunar landing, has the crew of Apollo 22 watching The Bob Newhart Show on the Jamestown lunar base and greeting each other with "Hi Bob."

In The Simpsons Season 32, Episode "Diary Queen", during a montage of Edna Krabappel (another character Marcia Wallace played) in the credits shown before end credits, is watching the show on her television during her lifetime, the character itself was previously retired during the show's twenty-fifth season due to Wallace's death in 2013.

== See also ==
- Hi, Bob – a drinking game based on watching the show
