= The Funny Side =

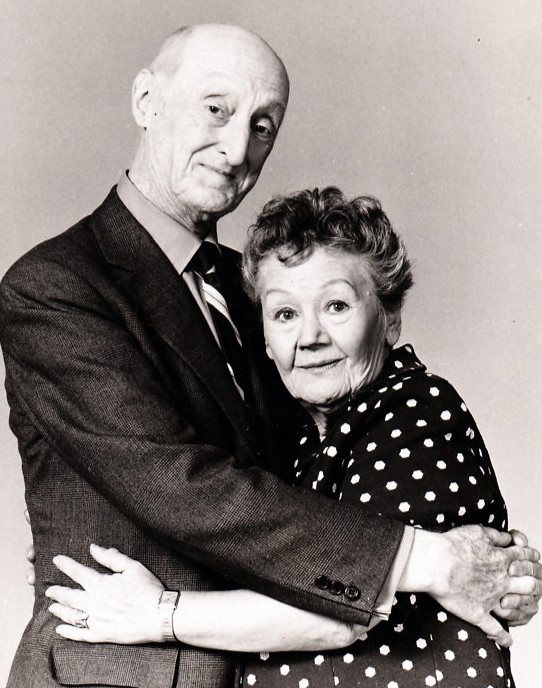
- Bert Mustin and Queenie Smith.
- Genre: Sketch comedy
- Starring: Gene Kelly; John Amos; Teresa Graves; Warren Berlinger; Michael Lembeck; Cindy Williams; Burt Mustin; Queenie Smith; Pat Finley; Dick Clair; Jenna McMahon
- Country of origin: United States
- Original language: English
- No. of seasons: 1
- No. of episodes: 6

Production
- Producers: Sam Denoff; Bill Persky
- Running time: 60 min.

Original release
- Network: NBC
- Release: September 21, 1971 – January 11, 1972

The Funny Side is an American sketch comedy program that aired on NBC as part of its 1971 fall lineup.

== Synopsis ==
The Funny Side was hosted by Gene Kelly and starred five pairs of actors and actresses who were presented as married couples. Each week was an examination of the "funny side" of a potential issue in real-life marriages, such as health, money, sex, and the like. Each couple was a stereotype. Kelly also appeared as an actor in the sketches, and there was also a musical aspect with production numbers. The musical numbers were written by Dave Frishberg.

== Cast ==
- John Amos and Teresa Graves as the Black couple
- Warren Berlinger and Pat Finley as the blue collar couple
- Dick Clair and Jenna McMahon as the wealthy couple
- Michael Lembeck and Cindy Williams as the teenage couple
- Burt Mustin and Queenie Smith as the elderly couple

== Cancellation ==
The Funny Side received poor Nielsen ratings and was cancelled after less than four months on the air.

== Bibliography ==
- Brooks, Tim and Marsh, Earle, The Complete Directory to Prime Time Network and Cable TV Shows
