= Peter Duffell =

British film director

- Duffell in 1975
- Born: 10 July 1922; Canterbury, Kent
- Died: 12 December 2017 (aged 95)
- Occupations: Television and film director
- Years active: 1961–1996
- Spouse: Rosslyn Cliffe (m. 1991)
- Children: 1

Peter Duffell (10 July 1922 − 12 December 2017) was an English film and television director and screenwriter.

== Early life ==
Duffell was born in Canterbury, Kent, in 1922. He was the only son of a broken marriage, which resulted in his attending a variety of schools in Kent and London, as his mother moved away to work and he was raised by his grandmother. With a strong academic bent and great enthusiasm for the arts, he studied at London University and then at Keble College, Oxford, where he took an honours degree in English language and literature.

== Career ==
Duffell began his career as a director with installments of the film series Scotland Yard and the Edgar Wallace Mysteries second features for Anglo-Amalgamated, both originally made for cinema release in the UK, as well as making documentaries and television commercials.

Based on his television work, Milton Subotsky of Amicus Productions selected Duffell to direct The House That Dripped Blood (1971). Christopher Lee, who appeared in the film, called him Britain's most underrated director. He turned down other Amicus films because he did not want to be typecast as a horror director.

Duffell moved on to write and direct the film script of a book by one of his greatest heroes Graham Greene, who, although notoriously dismissive of most film adaptations of his work, rated Duffell’s England Made Me (1973) "excellent". One of the film's stars, Tessa Wyatt, said in a 2013 interview that during its filming as a young actress alone abroad, the "pervy director" tried to coerce her into unnecessarily stripping naked for a scene.

Duffell was commissioned by Warner Brothers to direct Inside Out (1975), a caper movie filmed in Berlin.

Duffell was also Greene's choice to write and direct The Honorary Consul. Together they collaborated on the script, but in the event other interests intervened and to the great dismay of both Duffell and Greene the film was made to another script by another director. The two men remained lifelong friends and Greene continued to hope that they would again work together. Duffell won the BAFTA award for Best Director for Caught on A Train (1980), written by Stephen Poliakoff and featuring Peggy Ashcroft and Michael Kitchen. He also scripted and directed films based on the work of writers such as Margaret Drabble and Francis King, and wrote many other screenplays for cinema and television. Experience Preferred but Not Essential (1982), which he directed for David Puttnam, was shown at the London Film Festival and at festivals in Italy and Canada. It enjoyed box-office success in America where – after a rave interview by Vincent Canby in The New York Times – it ran for six months in one New York cinema alone.

Duffell's six-hour television epic The Far Pavilions (1984) for HBO and Goldcrest (shown by Channel 4 in the UK), from the best-selling novel by M. M. Kaye, was filmed in India. Omar Sharif said that Duffell's direction of the vast, colourful crowd scenes was on a par with David Lean's crowd scenes.

Letters from An Unknown Lover (Les Louves, 1986), is a bi-lingual French television film, also in English. King of The Wind (1990), is a children's adventure film shot in Turkey and the UK.

Duffell's many TV credits as director and writer include The Avengers (1967), Man in a Suitcase (1967–68), Journey to the Unknown (1969), Strange Report (1969), The Adventures of Black Beauty (1972), The Racing Game (1979–80), Inspector Morse (1988), and Space Precinct (1995).

== Personal life ==
One of Duffell's great passions was music, above all Wolfgang Amadeus Mozart, jazz – in his youth he led The Rhythm Club of High Wycombe – and flamenco, playing semi-pro flamenco guitar, sometimes at Ronnie Scott's, and producing a flamenco LP by leading Spanish musicians. He also had a passion for cricket and was a member of the MCC for many years.

Duffell's autobiography Playing Piano in A Brothel, the title derived from an old film industry joke, was published in the USA by Bear Manor Media. (When asked what he did for a living the man replied "I'm a film director, but please don't tell my mother, she thinks I play piano in a brothel".)

He lived with his wife of 30 years, the publicist Rosslyn Cliffe Duffell, between homes in South West of France and the South West of England, where he died after a stroke on 12 December 2017.

== Filmography ==
- The Never Never Murder (1961) (short) (Scotland Yard (film series)
- The Silent Weapon (1961) (short) (Scotland Yard (film series)
- The Grand Junction Case (1961) (short) (Scotland Yard (film series)
- Partners in Crime (1961)
- The House That Dripped Blood (1971)
- England Made Me (1973) + screenplay
- Inside Out (1975)
- Caught on a Train (TV film, 1980)
- Daisy (TV film, 1980)
- The Waterfall (TV film, 1980) + screenplay
- Experience Preferred... But Not Essential (1982)
- The Far Pavilions (TV Mini-series, 1984)
- Letters to an Unknown Lover (TV film, 1986)
- Hand in Glove (TV film, 1987)
- King of the Wind (1990)
- Some Other Spring (TV film, 1991) + screenplay
- Genghis Khan (1992)
- Tales of the Unexpected (TV series) (1984) Accidental Death.

== Memoirs ==
- Playing Piano in a Brothel: Memoirs of a Film Director (2010), with a foreword by Christopher Lee
