= Inside Out (1975 film) =

- British quad poster
- Directed by: Peter Duffell
- Written by: Judd Bernard; Stephen Schneck
- Produced by: Peter Duffell
- Starring: Telly Savalas; Robert Culp; James Mason; Aldo Ray; Doris Kunstmann
- Cinematography: John Coquillon
- Edited by: Thom Noble
- Music by: Konrad Elfers
- Production company: Kettledrum Films
- Distributed by: Warner Bros. Pictures
- Release date: 27 November 1975
- Running time: 97 minutes
- Country: United Kingdom
- Language: English

Inside Out is a 1975 British action thriller film, produced and directed by Peter Duffell, and starring James Mason, Robert Culp, and Telly Savalas. The film, shot in West Berlin and the Netherlands, aired on television in the United States on NBC on 1 January 1978 under the alternate title Hitler's Gold. It was also titled The Golden Heist, and Ein genialer Bluff (in West Germany).

== Plot ==
During World War II a crew of Wehrmacht soldiers driving a cargo truck is stopped by a road block of SS commandos who hijack the cargo and kill the passengers. In 1975, Harry Morgan and Sylvester "Sly" Wells plan to recover the cargo - six million dollars of Nazi gold. Harry Morgan, wealthy but heavily in debt, reminisces with old friend Ernst Furben at the London Embassy Hotel and Ernst tells Harry about his connection to the missing gold, which he saw as it was being prepared for transport to the Balkans by Nazi party official Reinhardt Holtz. Ernst proposes that he and Harry join forces to release Holtz from prison and find out the location of the gold.

Harry finds Sly in Amsterdam and agrees to take part in the heist. They travel to West Berlin, where they meet Ernst and drive by Seigfried prison where Holtz is an inmate. Harry asks Peter Dohlberg to finance the heist, and he agrees for 15% of the take. Peter's employee, Siggi, and her friend Erika Kurtz (Doris Kunstmann) arrange for Udo Blimperman (Peter Schlesinger) to provide uniforms from his costume shop. Harry talks to Prior, a prison sergeant at Seigfried prison, and learns about security procedures. Only one man is permitted to speak to Holtz, a doctor named Maar. Sly sketches out a confidence game to trick Holtz, using Erika as an assistant.

Sly, in love with Erika, sets up the game in an abandoned courthouse. Ernst and Sly purchase a camera to photograph Maar with a transsexual named Pauli. Maar is blackmailed by Schmidt and Ernst, claiming that Pauli was Ernst's nephew. Knowing the police will not believe him, Maar switches places with Holtz, accompanies by Harry and Sly disguised as United States Army officers. Holtz is sedated and extracted by Harry and Sly using a fake dental appointment as cover. Harry rebukes Prior for not having his name on the visitor's log as part of a ruse.

Erika changes Holtz's appearance to make him look younger and at the derelict courthouse, they change Holtz from Maar's borrowed civilian street clothes into a replica of his old Nazi uniform. Holtz is escorted into a courtroom furnished to look like a Third Reich office. Once inside the sedative wears off, he awakens to find himself in a staged meeting, with Schmidt disguised as Adolf Hitler, Sly disguised as an SS officer, and Ernst disguised as a Field Marshal. Schmidt states that Holtz stole the gold from the Reich and betrayed him. Holtz, confused, asks what gold was stolen. Schmidt tells Holtz that the gold disappeared only seven days ago, and confirms that Holtz signed the order to have it deposited into the Reich Bank. Ernst tells Holtz that Germany is winning the war and Holtz has been hospitalised. Holtz remembers that the gold was hidden to prevent Hermann Göring from stealing it, but will only disclose the location to Hitler and whispers to the disguised Schmidt it is hidden in his bunker at his summer home in Vanglitz. Holtz is sedated again and Sly proposes to return Holtz first thing in the morning before going after the gold. Harry refuses to wait, worried that it could be found by anyone at any time.

They cross the border into East Germany and find the bomb shelter at the summer home is buried under a new apartment building, separated from a basement room by three feet of concrete. Ernst contacts Wilhelm Schlager to arrange cooperation from the Soviet police garrison. He conceals a Walther PPK in his belt and calls Colonel Kosnikov of the Russian army to double cross the group and split the gold with Kosnikov. Soviet soldiers surround the house and kill Schlager. Sly secretly retrieves Schlager's handgun. Kosnikov demands a share for allowing them to stage a bomb threat to get access to the bunker. He reroutes his troops to the apartment building, and provides the group with equipment to impersonate a bomb disposal unit.

The army evacuates the residents and begin drilling through the concrete floor. Ernst announces that another bomb has been discovered, as a diversion to allow them to enter the hole leading to the bunker. Inside, the group finds two steel chests containing the gold. Kosnikov shows up alone, armed with a machine gun, to blackmail them and take the gold. As Schmidt pleads for their lives, Harry pins Kosnikov with a ladder. Kosnikov then shoots and kills Schmidt, after which Sly kills Kosnikov with Schlager's pistol. The team returns to West Germany, has a tense exchange with the checkpoint guard who as it turns out is only concerned bout incorrect flags on the car's hood, and they pass.

They pick up Erika, retrieve the sedated Holtz, and turn the gold over to Peter for conversion from bullion to United States dollars. They overcome an obstacle on the way to the prison where they're confronted by the United States Army colonel in charge of Seigfried. Harry talks them into the prison where Maar and Holtz are switched back to their proper places. Holtz wakes up in his cell to tell the guard that he believes he saw Hitler. As they leave, Harry asks Ernst if he ever was really a Nazi. Ernst replies "Not necessarily." After they abandon the staff car, Harry, Ernst and Sly walk away on the streets of Berlin.

== Cast ==
- Telly Savalas as Harry Morgan
- Robert Culp as Sylvester (Sly) Wells
- James Mason as Ernst Furben
- Günter Meisner as Hans Schmidt
- Aldo Ray as Master Sergeant Prior
- Adrian Hoven as Dr. Maar
- Wolfgang Lukschy as Reinhardt Holtz
- Charles Korvin as Peter Dohlberg
- Constantine Gregory as Colonel Kosnikov
- Richard Warner as Wilhelm Schlager
- Don Fellows as U.S. Army Colonel
- Doris Kunstmann as Erika Kurtz
- Lorna Dallas as Meredith Morgan
- Sigrid Hanack as Siggi
- Peter Schlesinger as Udo Blimpermann
- Stephen Curtis as Chess Boy
- Timothy Peters as Salesman

== Novelization ==
In advance of the film's release (as common for the era), a paperback novelization of the screenplay was released. The author was co-screenwriter Judd Bernard, and the affiliated publishers were Award Books (US) and Sphere Books (UK).

== Production ==
Plötzensee Prison in West Berlin was used for the prison scenes.

== See also ==
- Kelly's Heroes (1970)
- Escape to Athena (1979)
- Wild Geese II (1985)
