= Michael Kitchen =

English actor

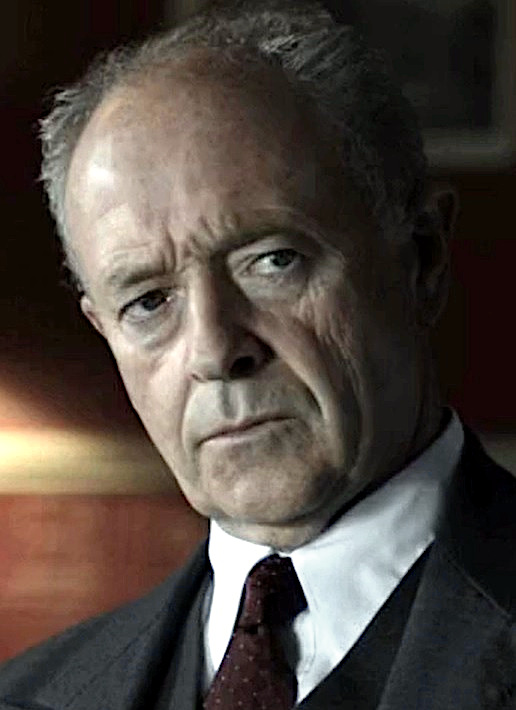
- Kitchen in Foyle's War series 7, 2013
- Born: Michael Roy Kitchen; 31 October 1948 (age 78); Leicester, England
- Occupations: Actor; television producer
- Years active: 1966–present

Michael Roy Kitchen (born 31 October 1948) is an English actor and television producer, best known for his starring role as Detective Chief Superintendent Christopher Foyle in the ITV drama Foyle's War, which ran for nine series between 2002 and 2015. He also played the role of Bill Tanner in two James Bond films opposite Pierce Brosnan, and that of John Farrow in BBC Four's comedy series Brian Pern.

== Early life ==
Michael Roy Kitchen was born in Leicester, to parents Arthur and Betty Kitchen. He attended the City of Leicester Boys' Grammar School, where he appeared on stage in a production of Cymbeline.

He is the firstborn son. His brother, Jeffrey, was born three years later in 1951. He grew up at 102 Wilberforce Rd, west of the current De Montfort campus. He was a senior scout in the 57th Leicester Scout group. At age 15, he was selected to attend several weeks' training at the National Youth Theatre. After school, he completed a year at the Belgrade Theatre in Coventry.

An opportunity arose when Leicester City Council offered him a grant to study at the Royal Academy of Dramatic Art (RADA) in London. He gratefully accepted, and graduated in 1969 with an Acting (RADA Diploma).

== Career ==
=== Television and film ===
Kitchen's film career started in 1971 with an appearance in the film Unman, Wittering and Zigo (1971), and the Hammer film Dracula A.D. 1972 (1972).

His early TV appearances include roles in Man at the Top (episode 4 "The Prime of Life", 1970), Play for Today (Hell's Angels by David Agnew, 1971), Fall of Eagles (1974, as Leon Trotsky), as the main character in The Early Life of Stephen Hind (BBC2, 1974), Thriller (1976), The Brontes of Haworth (1973, in which he played Branwell Brontë), Tales of the Unexpected and Beasts. He played the role of Martin in the original 1976 production of Dennis Potter's Brimstone and Treacle, Peter in Stephen Poliakoff's Caught on a Train, Edmund in the BBC Television Shakespeare production of King Lear, the Antipholi in the same series' production of The Comedy of Errors, Private Bamforth in the 1979 BBC television play of The Long and the Short and the Tall. Also in 1979 Kitchen appeared in an episode ("Runner") of the hard-hitting police drama The Professionals. He played the role of Duffy, a renegade former member of an organised crime network.

His other roles at this time include Larner in the film Breaking Glass (1980), Rochus Misch in The Bunker (1981), Berkeley Cole in the film Out of Africa (1985), the King in To Play the King (1993), a performance for which he was nominated for a BAFTA, an English land agent during the Irish Famine in The Hanging Gale (1995), for which he won a Golden FIPA award in 1996, and a recurring role as Bill Tanner in the Bond films GoldenEye (1995) and The World Is Not Enough (1999).

His later films include The Russia House (1990), Fools of Fortune (1990), Enchanted April (1992), The Trial (1993), Fatherland (1994), Doomsday Gun (1994), The Hanging Gale (1995), Kidnapped (1995), Mrs Dalloway (1997), The Railway Children (2000), Proof of Life (2000), Lorna Doone (2001) and My Week with Marilyn (2011).

Between 2002 and 2015, he starred in the award-winning ITV mystery-drama Foyle's War as the lead character Detective Chief Superintendent Christopher Foyle; he was also a producer for the show, which comprised nine series. His other noted appearances include The Buccaneers as Sir Helmsley Thwaite (1995), Dandelion Dead (1994), A Royal Scandal (1996), The Last Contract (Sista Kontraktet, 1998) a Swedish film about the assassination of Prime Minister Olof Palme, Paul Abbott's Alibi in 2003, Andrew Davies' dramatisation of Falling in 2005, ITV's three-part drama series Mobile (2007) and Channel 4's phone hacking comedy telemovie Hacks (2012).

Kitchen has guest-starred in roles in other popular British television shows such as Minder, Chancer, Inspector Morse, A Touch of Frost, Between the Lines, Pie in the Sky and Dalziel and Pascoe. He played Richard Crane in Reckless and John Farrow in the mockumentary The Life of Rock with Brian Pern.

=== Theatre ===
Kitchen is also a noted theatre actor. His roles have ranged from Ptolemy in Caesar and Cleopatra at the Belgrade Theatre in 1966, to Will in Howard Brenton's Magnificence at the Royal Court in 1973, to William Hogarth in Nick Dear's The Art of Success in 1986–87.

He played Mercutio in Romeo and Juliet for the RSC at Stratford and was a member of the National Theatre Company and the Young Vic, where he played Iago in Othello. In 1974 he appeared at Laurence Olivier's National Theatre in the play Spring Awakening opposite Peter Firth, Jenny Agutter, Beryl Reid and Cyril Cusack. Later he appeared opposite Sir Ralph Richardson and Sir John Gielgud in Harold Pinter's No Man's Land, directed by Peter Hall. In 1981 he played Melchior, the manservant of Zangler, in Tom Stoppard's play On the Razzle. In 1984 he played the cabin steward Dvornicheck in Stoppard's play Rough Crossing.

== Filmography ==
=== Film ===
Year	Title	Role	Notes				
1971	Unman, Wittering and Zigo	Bungabine	Drama				
1972	Dracula A.D. 1972	Greg	Horror				
1980	Breaking Glass	Larner	Drama, Musical	1985	Out of Africa	Berkeley	Romantic drama
1989	Dykket	Bricks	Thriller				
1990	Fools of Fortune	Mr Quinton	Rom-Com				
1990	The Russia House	Clive	Thriller				
1992	Enchanted April	George Briggs	Drama				
1995	GoldenEye	Bill Tanner	Thriller				
1997	Mrs Dalloway	Peter Walsh	Romantic drama				
1998	The Last Contract ("Sista Kontraktet")	John Gales alias Ray Lambert	Thriller (Swedish)				
1999	The World Is Not Enough	Bill Tanner	Action adventure				
2000	New Year's Day	Robin	Drama				
2000	Proof of Life	Ian Havery	Thriller				
2011	My Week with Marilyn	Hugh Perceval	Biopic drama				

=== Television ===
Year	Title	Role	Notes
1970	Thirty-Minute Theatre	Waller	Episode: "Is That Your Body, Boy?"
1971	Man at the Top	Trevor	Episode: "The Prime of Life"
1971	Z-Cars	Royal Hall	2 episodes
1972	ITV Sunday Night Theatre		Episode: "The Web"
1972	New Scotland Yard	Peter Coppard	Episode: "Hoax"
1973	Late Night Theatre	Paul	Episode: "Susan"
1973	Orson Welles Great Mysteries	Herbert White	Episode: The Monkey's Paw
1973	Love Story	Roy	Episode: "Audrey had a Little Lamb"
1973	Marked Personal	Simon	2 episodes
1974	Jackanory Playhouse	King Thrushbeard	Episode: "King Thrushbeard and the Proud Princess"
1974	Fall of Eagles	Leon Trotsky	2 episodes
1974	Thriller	Ian/George Newton	2 episodes
1975	Savages	Carlos Esquerdo	TV film
1975	Churchill's People	John Wilmot, Earl of Rochester	Episode: "A Bill of Morality"
1976	Play for Today	Martin	Episode: Brimstone and Treacle
1979	The Professionals	Duffy	Episode: "Runner"
1979–1980	BBC2 Playhouse	Rose S.J./Peter	2 episodes, including Caught on a Train
1980	Lady Killers	Reverend Father M'Enery	Episode: "Not for the Nervous"
1981	The Bunker	Rochus Misch	TV film
1981	Tales of the Unexpected	Arthur	Episode: "The Best of Everything"
1984	Weekend Playhouse	Ed	Episode: "As Man and Wife"
1984	Freud	Ernst von Fleischi-Marxow	3 episodes
1989	Minder	Maltese Tony	Episode: "Fiddler on the Hoof"
1989	Theatre Night	David	Episode: "Benefactors"
1989	Screen One	Bill English	Episode: "Home Run
1991	Chancer	Roman	2 episodes
1991	Mozart on Tour	Reader of Mozart's letters	13 episodes
1992	Boon	Donald Blake	Episode: "Shot in the Dark"
1992	Lovejoy	David Herbert	Episode: "Kids"
1992	Inspector Morse	Russell Clark	Episode: "The Death of the Self"
1993	The Young Indiana Jones Chronicles	Lloyd George	Episode: "Paris, May 1919"
1993	Screen Two	Block	Episode: The Trial
1993	The Good Guys	Graham Croxley	Episode: "Old School Ties"
1993	To Play the King	The King	4 episodes
1994	Fatherland	Max Jäger	TV film
1994	Shakespeare: The Animated Tales	Polixenes/ Narrator	2 episodes
1994	Dandelion Dead	Major Herbert Rowse Armstrong	4 episodes
1994	Pie in the Sky	Dudley Hooperman	Episode: "The Best of Both Worlds"
1995	The Hanging Gale	Captain William Townsend	4 episodes
1996	A Touch of Frost	Jonathan Meyerbridge	Episode: "The Things We Do for Love"
1997	Harry Enfield and Chums	David the Director	1 episode
1997	Reckless	Richard Crane	Miniseries
1997	Sunnyside Farm	Letchworth	Miniseries
1998	Dalziel and Pascoe	Philip Swain	Episode: "Bones and Silence"
1999	Oliver Twist	Mr Brownlow	Miniseries
1999–2002	Always and Everyone	Jack Turner	18 episodes
2000	The Railway Children	Father	TV film
2000–2006	Faking It	Narrator	7 seasons
2001	Second Sight	Lord Bruce Roddam	Episode: "Parasomnia"
2002–2015	Foyle's War	Christopher Foyle	28 episodes
2007	Mobile	David West	Episode: "The Soldier"
2012	White Heat	Jack (Present Day)	"Episode": The Sea of Trees
2014	The Life of Rock with Brian Pern	John Farrow	8 episodes
2016	The Collection	Frederic Lemaire	Episode: "The Scent"
2017	Brian Pern	John Farrow	

Acting roles
Preceded by James Villiers	Bill Tanner actor from the James Bond films 1995 – '99	Succeeded by Rory Kinnear
Preceded by Iain Cuthbertson	"Father" actor from The Railway Children; 2000	Most recent
