= Pat Finley =

American stage and television actress

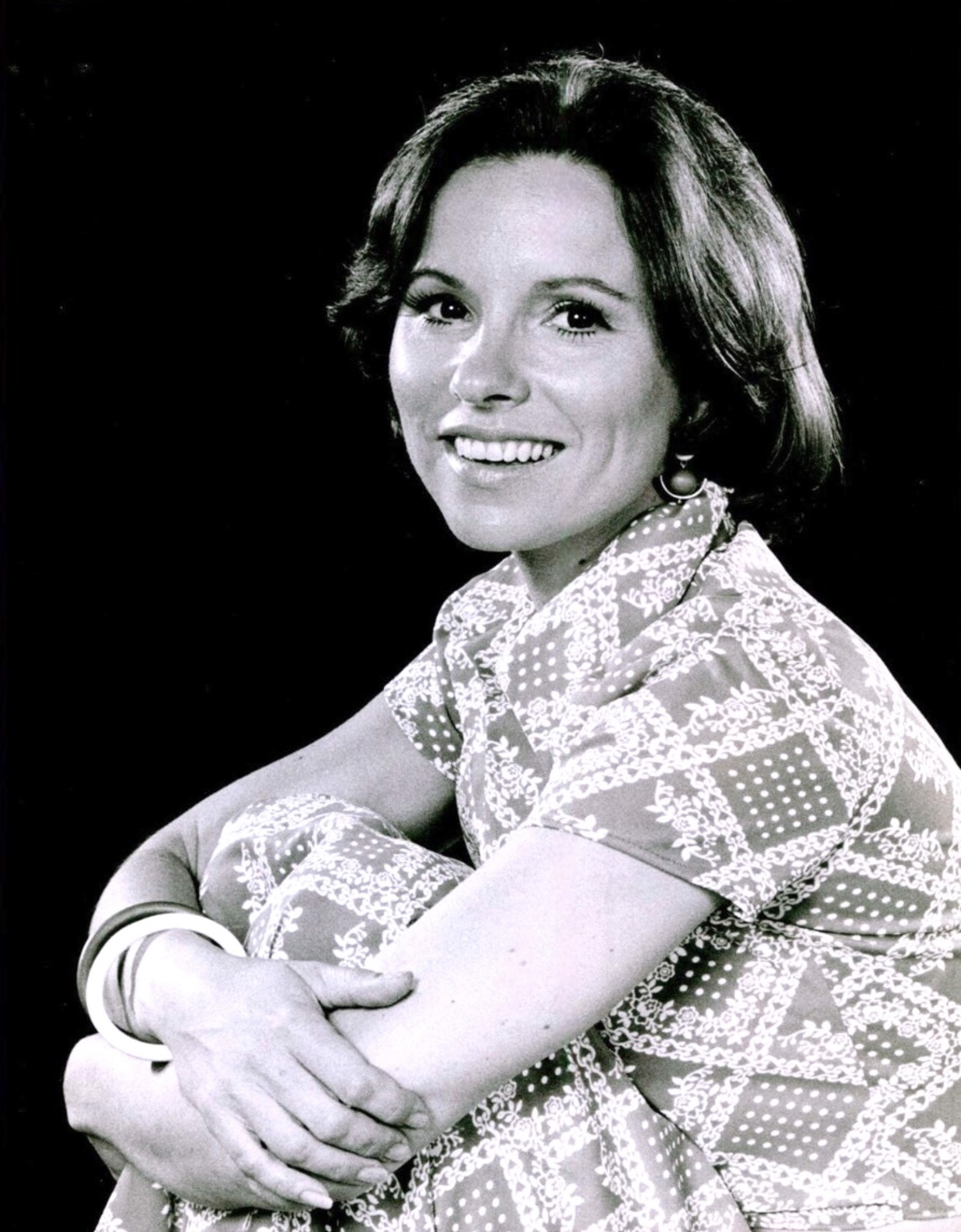
- Finley in The Bob Newhart Show, 1974
- Born: Patricia Helen Karen Finley; October 14, 1938 (age 88); Asheville, North Carolina, U.S.
- Other name: Patte Finley
- Occupations: Actress, businesswoman
- Years active: 1944–1996
- Known for: The Bob Newhart Show

Patricia Helen Karen Finley (born October 14, 1938) is an American former actress and businesswoman best known for her role as Ellen Hartley, Bob‘s sister on The Bob Newhart Show. She was also credited as Patte Finley in From a Bird's Eye View, The Mary Tyler Moore Show, Perry Mason, and on Broadway.

In addition to her acting work, Finley was also active in film distribution and business ventures, balancing acting with executive work in the Pacific Northwest during the 1970s.

== Early life ==
Born October 14, 1938, at Asheville, North Carolina's Mission Hospital, Finley moved with her family to Washington while still an infant. She was raised in the Pacific Northwest, where her father, Robert Finley, served as a justice of the Washington Supreme Court and grew up in with her siblings Mary Ellen "Sparkle" and younger brother Randy Finley, who would go on to operate a chain of movie theaters in the Pacific Northwest. Her mother Werdna was a philanthropist and promoter of children's theater.

== Career ==
Finley began performing at the age of four, appearing in children's theater productions in Washington before pursuing professional acting work.

She then started her professional stage career off Broadway in the early 1960s before appearing in a number of major stage musicals, including Bye Bye Birdie, Kiss Me, Kate, Damn Yankees, and Greenwich Village, U.S.A. For a time she was managed by Wally Amos, future cookie entrepreneur, then of the William Morris Agency.

Her Broadway breakthrough came with Hello, Dolly!, in which she played the role of Irene Molloy. She joined the production during its second year and remained with the show through its fourth year, performing opposite leading actresses such as Carol Channing, Ginger Rogers, and Martha Raye.

In 1963, she starred as Molly Brown in The Unsinkable Molly Brown for the San Bernardino Civic Light Opera, where her performance was noted for its energetic and forthright characterization. Her stage work during this period contributed to her reputation as a versatile musical comedy performer.

During the 1970s, Finley starred in the sitcom From a Bird's Eye View in 1969 and made a guest appearance on The Mary Tyler Moore Show in 1970. She also appeared in short-lived or unsold television projects, including the NBC series The Funny Side and the unaired pilot Flannery and Quill, produced by Carl Reiner and starring Red Buttons and Harold Gould. She later cited these experiences as illustrative of the instability of television work.

Finley appeared in 15 episodes of The Bob Newhart Show as Ellen Hartley, Bob Hartley’s sister, who becomes romantically involved with neighbor Howard Borden, portrayed by Bill Daily. Finley spoke positively about the collaborative atmosphere of the series and praised Bob Newhart’s understated comedic style, describing the production as notably collegial compared to other television sets.

She appeared in 6 episodes of The Rockford Files as the wife of Dennis Becker, portrayed by Joe Santos. Finley reprised her role on The Rockford Files in the 1996 television film Godfather Knows Best.

In the late 1970s and early 1980s, Finley increasingly focused on live performance, appearing as a cabaret singer in small venues in the Seattle area. In 1982, she held a multi-week engagement at a Seattle restaurant club, performing a repertoire of popular standards. Reviews of her cabaret work were mixed but noted her theatrical background and professional stage presence.

In 1990 Finley became a co-host of Seattle Today, a local daytime television show.

=== Business ventures ===
Alongside her acting career, Finley became active in film distribution and related business ventures. She was a partner and later vice president of Seattle-based Specialty Films, a company involved in acquiring and distributing motion pictures in the United States. Working with her brother, Randy Finley, she helped secure U.S. distribution rights to the film The King of Hearts, which Specialty Films re-released theatrically beginning in 1974. By early 1976, the film had circulated in dozens of prints nationwide and grossed several hundred thousand dollars.

Finley stated that her interest in business stemmed in part from the financial insecurity of acting, describing the film industry as unpredictable and emphasizing the importance of financial independence outside performance work.

== Personal life ==
During the mid-1970s, Finley lived in Los Angeles, where she owned a small house in the hills near the Hollywood Bowl. She described the residence as modest in size but noted that it included features such as multiple fireplaces, patios, and a balcony, and that she took particular pride in maintaining the home.

Finley stated in interviews that she had never married and did not consider marriage a personal priority, explaining that she preferred independence and professional flexibility. Contemporary profiles described her as living alone and managing her personal affairs independently while maintaining an active professional life.

Since the 1980s she has divided her time between Seattle and Annecy, France.

== Filmography ==
=== Television ===
Year(s)	Title	Role	Notes
1963	Perry Mason	Grace Kingman	1 episode
1970–1971	From a Bird's Eye View	Maggie Ralston	16 episodes; credited as Patte Finley
1970–1971	The Mary Tyler Moore Show	Sparkie / Francis Franklin / Twinks McFarland	2 episodes; credited as Patte Finley
1971	The Funny Side	Blue-collar wife	6 episodes
1972	Keeping Up with the Joneses	—	Television film
1973	Love, American Style	Lisa	1 episode ("Love and the Weighty Problem")
1973	Lotsa Luck	Marsha	1 episode
1974–1976	The Bob Newhart Show	Ellen Hartley	15 episodes
1976	Flannery and Quill	Rose Flannery Caselli	Television pilot film
1975–1979	The Rockford Files	Peggy Becker	7 episodes
1979	The Love Boat	Adele	1 episode
1981	Diff'rent Strokes	Mrs. Moore	1 episode
1980–1982	Lou Grant	Mrs. Wilke / Lilly / Constance Kraft	3 episodes
1982	An Innocent Love	June Woodward	Television film
1984	The Duck Factory	Irma Hodge	1 episode
1991	Perry Mason: The Case of the Fatal Fashion	Judge Treyball	Television film
1992	Perry Mason: The Case of the Reckless Romeo	Judge Andrea Nachman	Television film
1993	Perry Mason: The Case of the Killer Kiss	Judge Andrea Nachman	Television film
1996	The Rockford Files: Godfather Knows Best	Peggy Becker	Television film
