= Aleksandar Madžar (musician) =

Serbian musician

Aleksandar Madžar (born in Belgrade, 1968) is a Serbian pianist.

== Biography ==
Madžar first studied piano with Gordana Malinović, Arbo Valdma and Eliso Virsaladze in Belgrade and Moscow, then with Edouard Mirzoian at the Strasbourg Conservatory and in Brussels with Daniel Blumenthal. He now holds professorships at the Royal Conservatoire, Brussels and the Hochschule für Musik und Theater in Bern.

Madžar was awarded the 3rd prize at the XII Leeds competition. Of his prize in the 1996 Leeds Piano Competition, Gerald Larner of The Times described Madžar as the most imaginative musician among the 1996 finalists. The Leeds competition propelled Madžar onto the UK scene where he also became a sought after soloist with the Royal and BBC Philharmonics, BBC Scottish Symphony, Scottish Chamber Orchestra and BBC National Orchestra of Wales, as well as throughout Europe and Asia, working with Paavo Berglund, Ivan Fischer, Paavo Järvi, Carlos Kalmar, John Nelson, Libor Pesek, André Previn, Andris Nelsons and the late Marcello Viotti.

Various select partnerships are key to Aleksandar Madžar’s current performance schedule. His partnership with violinist Ilya Gringolts sees them next perform a complete Beethoven cycle at the 2008 Verbier Festival and, following the world premiere of Sir Peter Maxwell Davies' Violin Sonata at St Magnus and Cheltenham Festivals in summer 2008, recitals at Prague and Beethovenfest Bonn Festivals. His partnership with soprano Juliane Banse continues next season with a tour of Spain to Bilbao, Valencia, Leon and Lisbon’s Gulbenkian Foundation. After a successful cooperation with the Irish Chamber Orchestra's 2007 summer festival, under the artistic leadership of colleague Anthony Marwood, the two further collaborated in recital in Edinburgh. Plans include a cycle at the Wigmore Hall, his recital debut in Amsterdam's Concertgebouw Hall and a return in recital to the Wigmore Hall, London.

In 2008-09 Madžar maintained his schedule of diverse performance activities taking him worldwide: in recital he returned to Tokyo, to Paris, Theatre de la Ville, Cardiff and the Vlaanders Festival. With Stuttgart Philharmonic he performed in Milan’s Conservatorio G Verdi, and returned to the Irish Chamber Orchestra, BBC Belfast Symphony and Belgrade Philharmonic.

Aleksandar Madžar has given solo recitals in Berlin, London, Rome, Florence, Milan, Hamburg, Duisburg and in 2007-08 his US recital debut on the Miami International Piano Festival was an astounding success. He is a regular guest artist at the festivals of Bad Kissingen, Schleswig Holstein, the Ivo Pogorelich Festival at Bad Wörishofen, Klavier Festival Ruhr, Davos, Roque-d’Antheron, Salzburg, Sintra and Aldeburgh.

His discography includes the two Chopin piano concertos, with the Frankfurt Radio Symphony Orchestra and Dmitri Kitaenko for BMG/Classic FM (1997), for the French label Arion (1999) a disc of Chabrier's music for two pianos and, working regularly with cellist Louise Hopkins, a disc of Elliot Carter, Rachmaninov and Schnittke for the Swedish label Intim Musik.
