= The Railway Children (disambiguation) =

The Railway Children is a children's book written by Edith Nesbit and published in 1906.

The Railway Children may also refer to:

== Media ==
- The Railway Children (TV 1968), a 1968 BBC television drama based on the book
- The Railway Children (1970 film), a 1970 film based on the book
- The Railway Children (2000 film), a 2000 drama television film based on the book
- The Railway Children (band), a British alternative rock band
- Railway Children (film), a 2016 Indian film
- The Railway Children Return, a 2022 film directed by Morgan Matthews and produced by Jemma Rodgers

== Organisations ==
- Railway Children, a UK charity supporting alone and at risk children in India, the UK and East Africa.
