= The Railway Children (2000 film) =

2000 television film directed by Catherine Morshead

- Genre: Drama
- Based on: The Railway Children by E. Nesbit
- Screenplay by: Simon Nye
- Directed by: Catherine Morshead
- Starring: Jenny Agutter; Richard Attenborough; David Bamber; Jack Blumenau; Gregor Fisher; Michael Kitchen; Jemima Rooper; Clare Thomas
- Country of origin: United Kingdom
- Original language: English

Production
- Producer: Charles Elton
- Editor: Don Fairservice
- Running time: 108 minutes
- Production company: Carlton Television

Original release
- Network: ITV
- Release: 23 April 2000

The Railway Children is a 2000 drama television film based on the 1906 novel by E. Nesbit. It was broadcast for the first time in the United Kingdom on 23 April 2000 (which was Easter Sunday). Shortly afterwards, it was shown in the United States on the series Masterpiece Theatre.

== Plot ==
Roberta (Bobbie), Peter and Phyllis live a comfortable and carefree upper middle-class life in London with their parents. But when their father, a senior civil servant, is arrested on a charge of treason, found guilty, and imprisoned for life they are forced to move with their mother to Three Chimneys, a cold and run-down country cottage near a railway.

Whilst Mother tries to make a meagre living writing stories and poems she hopes magazines and newspapers will publish, the children seek amusement by watching the trains on the nearby railway line (the fictional Great Northern & Southern Railway) and waving to the passengers. They become friendly with Perks, the cheerful station porter, but feel the wrath of the stationmaster when Peter is caught trying to steal coal to heat the house. Occasionally the children quarrel, but they always call "pax" (a truce) and remain good-natured.

They become friends with an aristocratic old gentleman (whose name is never revealed) by waving to him on the 9:15 down train that he takes regularly. They ask him to assist them with food and medicine when their mother falls ill. He is happy to do so, although Mother is angry and humiliated.

The children save the lives of passengers on a train by alerting the driver to a landslide; they give shelter to a Russian dissident, Mr Szczepansky, and help to reunite him with his family. They rescue Jim, a student at a nearby boarding school, who is injured whilst taking part in a paper chase along the railway line. Jim stays with them until his leg is healed. On taking his leave, he gives Bobbie his address so that they can write.

Bobbie eventually discovers the truth of her father's absence, despite her mother's efforts to shield the children from it, and appeals to the old gentleman for help. As a director of the railway company with influential friends, he is able to help prove their father's innocence. Bobbie meets her freed father at the railway station and the family is reunited.

== Cast ==
- Jemima Rooper as Bobbie
- Jack Blumenau as Peter
- Clare Thomas as Phyllis
- Jenny Agutter as Mother
- Richard Attenborough as The Old Gentleman
- Gregor Fisher as Perks
- Michael Kitchen as Father
- David Bamber as Doctor Forrest
- Melanie Clark Pullen as Ruth
- Georgie Glen as Aunt Emma
- Velibor Topić as Mr Szczepansky
- Sophie Thompson as Mrs Perks
- JJ Feild as Jim
- Clive Russell as The Station Master
- Amanda Walker as Mrs Ransome

== Filming locations and rolling stock ==
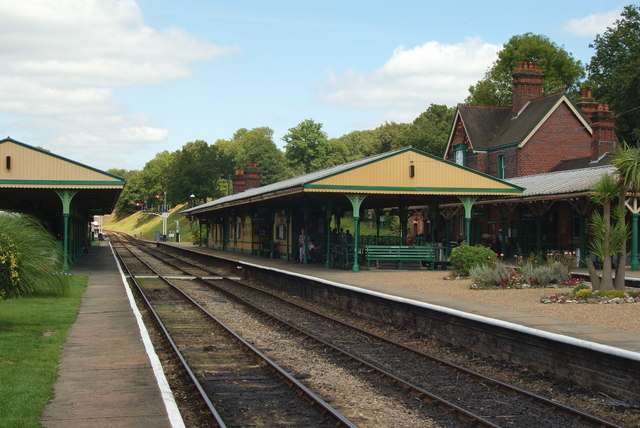
Horsted Keynes station

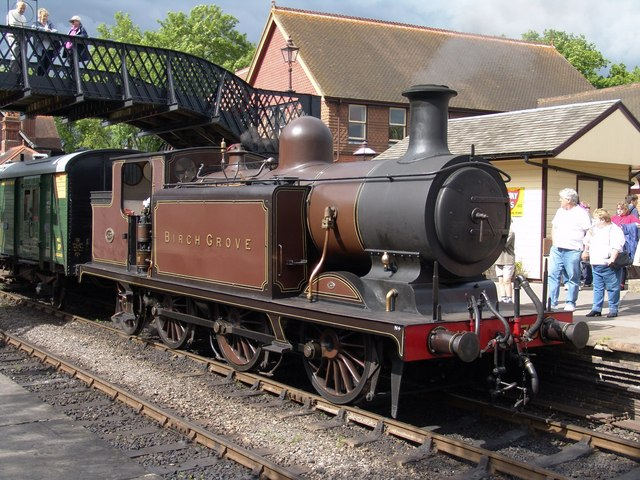
473 'Birch Grove' wearing the same livery it carried in the film.

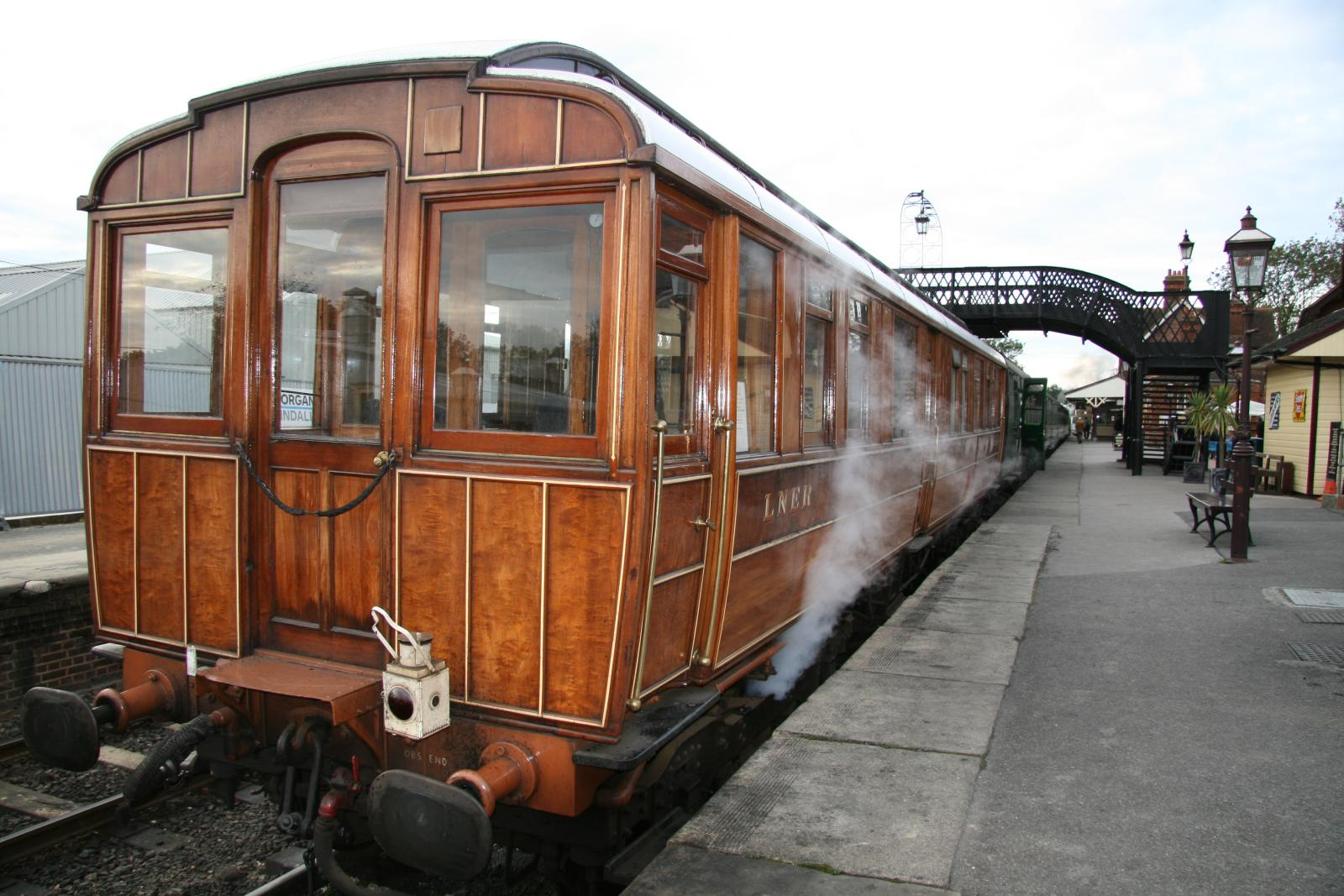
GNR Director's Saloon No. 706

The area of England to which the family move is not specified, but the railway scenes were filmed on the Bluebell Railway. The railway was chosen because of the collection of period rolling stock, Sharpthorne Tunnel, which was seen as ideal for the tunnel scene, and the fact that the Old Gentleman in the story commutes daily to London (with the 2000 setting being nearer London that the 1970 film set in Yorkshire).

The station used in the film was Horsted Keynes, which was featured heavily in a number of scenes. The landslide scene was filmed in the cutting near the Three-Arch Bridge, where a sliding section of embankment was placed on the bank in order to create the landslide.

As in the original film, a wide range of rolling stock was used. The locomotives seen are SECR C Class No. 592 (as the Green Dragon), NBR C Class No. 673 'Maude', LB&SCR E4 class No. 473 'Birch Grove' and LSWR B4 class No. 96 'Normandy'. No. 592 and Maude were painted in fictional liveries for the filming, with No. 592 wearing typical SECR lined green but with GNSR lettering, symbolising the fictional Great Northern and Southern Railway, and Maude in plain black with GNSR lettering. Birch Grove was seen sporting its original LB&SCR lined brown, and Normandy was painted in Southern Railway unlined black. Maude is based on the Bo'ness and Kinneil Railway near Edinburgh whilst the other locomotives remain on the Bluebell Railway. As of 2019, No. 592, Birch Grove (now painted SR Green and numbered B473), Maude and Normandy all await overhauls.

The carriages used in one rake during the film were Metropolitan Railway Full Third No. 394 and Brake Third No. 387 (both sporting lined varnish). These were joined in some scenes by the old gentleman's carriage, Great Northern Railway Director's Saloon No. 706 (also sporting lined varnish). The other carriage set was made up of LBSCR First Class No. 7598, SECR Hundred Seaters Nos. 971 and 1098, and SR Guards Van No. 404 (all painted in SR lined green). As of 2019, all of these carriages remain in use apart from No. 971, which is stored awaiting overhaul.

== Home media ==
The Railway Children was released on VHS and DVD in the UK by Carlton Video on 11 September 2000.

== See also ==
- The Railway Children (1970 film)
- The Boxcar Children (2014 film)

== Notes ==
Much of the advance publicity for the film focused on the casting of Jenny Agutter as Mother, thirty years on from her portrayal of elder daughter Bobbie in the 1970 film version - a role she had also played in the 1968 BBC Television adaptation, making this her third appearance in a version of the story.
