= Gary Warren =

Gary Warren may refer to:

- Gary Warren (actor) (born 1954), British former child actor
- Gary Warren (footballer) (born 1984), English footballer
