= As the Bell Rings (British TV series) =

British television series

- Starring: Brad Kavanagh; Gregg Sulkin; Emily Gloyens; Pax Baldwin; Chris Parkinson; Jennifer Veal; Sydney Rae White; Daniel Anthony; Lara Hendrickse; Olivia Scott-Taylor; Jack Blumenau; Cameron Butterwick
- Country of origin: United Kingdom
- No. of seasons: 2
- No. of episodes: 32 (list of episodes)

Production
- Running time: 5 minutes
- Production companies: Walt Disney Television International; Talkback Thames

Original release
- Network: Disney Channel UK
- Release: 2 April 2007 – 4 July 2008

As the Bell Rings is a 2007–2008 Disney Channel UK original interstitial program. Its name is based on the show As the World Turns. The format is a selection of short live-action comedy sequences. It is a British adaptation of the Disney Channel Italy original series Quelli dell'intervallo.

== Premise ==
It follows the adventures of a number of students at Shakespeare High School, who use their school break to sort out problems with life and love, friends and foes, home and homework. All of the action takes place in front of a window, and there is no other live action away from the hallway.

== Production ==
The show was originally intended to be shown on Disney Channel's rival network Nickelodeon UK under the working title Break Kids; however, this never happened and the original episodes using the working title were quickly aired on Disney Channel prior to the show's official start. In September Disney Channel aired a similar show 'Break Kids' but it was not very successful and was cancelled after the first few episodes aired.

== Cast and characters ==
- Gregg Sulkin as JJ – JJ is known as 'The Hopeless Romantic'. He is madly in love with Bella and tries all he can to get her to notice him; however, he is cursed with bad luck. He's always in trouble, constantly breaking items around the school, or forgetting his homework. He always has a complicated scheme to get himself out of trouble, but these usually make the situation worse. JJ's best friend is the coolest kid in school, Danny. JJ is pretty fashionable in a lazy 'doesn't spend long choosing his clothes' kind of way, and he enjoys Indie rock Music.
- Emily Gloyens as Gabby – Gabby is known as 'The Nervous Wreck'. She desperately wants to be popular, and this desperation makes her very nervous. In turn, this makes her talk too much. She also has the peculiar habit of screaming with excitement. She is very bad at keeping secrets, but this makes her popular if other students want to know something about anyone else. It is widely acknowledged that she'd actually be OK if she'd just calmed down slightly. Gabby mainly likes pop music but will happily listen to anything. She likes Bip.
- Pax Baldwin as Reece – Reece is known as 'The School Police' and the head student. He is the teacher-appointed liaison between staff and pupils. He serves out his position with great pride and enthusiasm, and this means that anything he hears will get straight back to the teachers. He can't understand why this makes him unpopular and assumes everyone is just jealous of his status. Reece would like to fit in more, but not if that means putting his position in jeopardy. He is efficient and hard working, and has the uncanny ability of being able to appear where and when you'd least like to see him. He organises many of the official school events, although it is believed that this is the only because he won't get an invite any other way. Reece believes that Shakespeare High should have a uniform. He is too busy to take an interest in popular music, but he has a formal dress sense.
- Jennifer Veal as Lucy – Lucy is known as 'The Young One'. She is smart and funny, but cursed with being a year younger than everyone else. It doesn't matter how trendy she is, or how many times she embarrasses her older brother JJ with her sharp wit, she will always be treated like a kid by the others. She is desperate to be accepted by the older kids, and this desperation provides a massive hole in her armour. The young looking haircuts and clothes that her Mum persistently buys for her don't help! She has developed an alliance with Warren because she is the only one close to his intellectual level, and because he is the only older kid who treats her as an equal. She tries to dress like Bella, but she shops with her Mum, and this makes this hard! Lucy likes hip hop music.
- Sydney Rae White as Emma – Emma is known as 'The Matchmaker'. She's attractive, but lacks self-confidence. She's always overshadowed by her best friend Bella. Emma gets a lot of attention from boys. She can't believe anyone would be interested in her. In season 2 Emma becomes known as 'the rebel' who has a crush on Dylan and becomes a rebel bordering rock chick.
- Daniel Anthony as Danny – Danny is known as 'The Cool Kid'. He is effortlessly good at everything and this makes him very popular with the girls, although he doesn't seem to notice. He's best friends with JJ and always becomes implicated in his plans. However, he never gets into any trouble. The one thing Danny lacks is imagination and that's what makes JJ the perfect friend for him. Things are considered more fun with JJ around. Danny is naturally fashionable, and looks good in everything, whilst he has a diverse taste in music. It is hinted that he has a crush on Charlotte.
- Lara Hendrickse as Bella – Bella is known as a 'Primadonna Fashionista with a Sharp Tongue'. She is self-obsessed and may have an overdeveloped sense of her own beauty, popularity and intelligence. Her vanity makes her an easy target for practical jokes and teasing, but she'll never change her drama queen ways. She loves the spotlight, and though she may refuse JJ's attentions, she would definitely miss it if they stopped. In "The Dude in the Iron Mask" it is revealed that Bella has some feelings for JJ, as she tried to ask him out when she thought he was wearing the iron mask (though it was in fact Warren at the time). Her image and fashion choices mean the world to Bella who won't be seen dead in anything other than the latest trends. She also enjoys Pop Music.
- Caroline Wise as Charlotte – She is editor of the School newspaper. Charlotte is the second-smartest person in the year after Warren. She often tries to be helpful towards others and is very rarely in trouble herself. Danny hints at times that he may have a crush on her but she does not say if she returns the feelings. She does not know that Danny has a crush on her, despite his awkward interactions with her and JJ's constant hints.
- Olivia Scott-Taylor as Rocky – Rocky is a very sporty girl. She can sometimes scare boys a little because of her strength.
- William Jeffes as Warren – Also known as "The Know it All" is a highly intelligent student. In an episode he had magical powers such as opening and closing lockers with the click of his fingers. He also has a crush on Emma.
- Jack Blumenau as Tinker (series 1) – Tinker is known as 'The Joker'. Tinker is clever but a bit superficial and virtually everything he does is part of some joke or prank. Be careful what you eat, drink, or sit on when he's about. His problem is that he's been doing it so long that all his friends are on their guard and no one believes anything he says. This drives him to new and more imaginative pranks, but also leads to problems when he genuinely needs something. He is regularly the target of revenge attacks. Although Tinker is definitely 'one of the gang' he does seem to be following his own agenda ... He doesn't have a specific fashion sense and he'll wear anything and everything. He listens to all sorts of music, as long as it's modern. Tinker is not in season 2 as he was replaced by Josh.
- Jacob Scipio as Bip (series 2) – What Bip lacks in brains, he makes up for in enthusiasm. He's not the sharpest tool in the box, but most certainly has a big heart. He also enjoys important roles in other people's plans. He might not understand the plan, but he'll do everything he can to carry it out. He's a good guy, but his lack of brains can get him into trouble. They can also be useful to his friends. He's in to girls and loves the latest fashion. Bip does not appear in Season 1. He likes Gabby.
- Brad Kavanagh as Dylan (series 2) – Dylan is known as the rocker. He writes songs and plays his guitar for at least 20 hours a day. He has a crush on Emma but won't admit it. He is cool, down to earth and is into rock music.

== Episodes ==
Series	Episodes	Originally released	
Series	Episodes	First released	Last released
1	24	2 April 2007	13 September 2007
2	9	9 January 2008	4 July 2008
