= The Railway Children (1970 film) =

1970 film by Lionel Jeffries

- Theatrical poster
- Directed by: Lionel Jeffries
- Screenplay by: Lionel Jeffries
- Based on: The Railway Children by E. Nesbit
- Produced by: Robert Lynn
- Starring: Jenny Agutter; Sally Thomsett; Gary Warren; Dinah Sheridan; Bernard Cribbins; William Mervyn; Ann Lancaster
- Cinematography: Arthur Ibbetson
- Edited by: Teddy Darvas
- Music by: Johnny Douglas
- Production company: EMI Elstree
- Distributed by: MGM-EMI
- Release date: 21 December 1970
- Running time: 110 minutes
- Country: United Kingdom
- Language: English
- Budget: £500,000 or £300,000

The Railway Children is a 1970 British family drama film based on the 1906 novel of the same name by E. Nesbit. The film was directed by Lionel Jeffries and stars Dinah Sheridan, Jenny Agutter, (Note: Agutter had featured earlier in the BBC's 1968 dramatisation of the novel.) Sally Thomsett, Gary Warren and Bernard Cribbins in the leading roles. The film was released to cinemas in the United Kingdom on 21 December 1970.

The film rights were bought by Jeffries. It was his directorial debut and he wrote the screenplay. The Railway Children was a critical success, both at time of release and in later years.

== Plot ==
=== Opening credits ===
Bobbie Waterbury is shown dressed as a young woman, walking around a room and fondly examining photographs and toys from her and her siblings' childhood.

=== Main film ===
In 1905, the Waterbury family lives in a luxurious villa in the London suburbs. Charles Waterbury, the father, works at the Foreign Office but, the day after Christmas, he is arrested on suspicion of being a spy, a fact hidden from the rest of the family by his wife. Now impoverished, they move to a house called Three Chimneys in Yorkshire, near to Oakworth railway station. When they arrive, they find the house in a mess and rat-infested. The three children, Roberta (known as Bobbie), Phyllis and Peter, find amusement in watching the trains on the nearby railway line and waving to the passengers. They become friends with Albert Perks, the station porter, and with an elderly gentleman who regularly takes the 9:15 train.

To make ends meet, their mother works as a writer and meanwhile home-schools the children. When Mrs Waterbury falls ill with influenza, Bobbie writes to the gentleman, who delivers food and medicine to the house to help their mother recover. Later Mrs Waterbury admonishes the children for telling others of their plight and asking for assistance. The following day, a man collapses at the railway station. He speaks a language no one understands, but the children discover he also speaks French, in which their mother is fluent. She learns from him that he is an exiled Russian writer who has arrived in England in search of his family, who have fled there. While he stays at their house, Bobbie writes another letter to the gentleman, and with his help the family is soon found.

One day, the children witness a landslide which has partially obstructed the tracks. The girls fashion their red petticoats into flags to warn the driver of the impending danger and the train stops in time. The railway company and villagers hold a party for the children, and they are given lifetime train-passes and personalised engraved watches. They are now dubbed "The Railway Children".

Discovering that Mr Perks does not celebrate his birthday, the children secretly ask for gifts from the villagers that he has helped in the past and deliver them to his house. Mr Perks initially refuses the gifts as he does not accept charity. However, after the children explain the true circumstances, he thanks them for their kindness. In return, the following day, he delivers old newspapers and magazines for them to read. There Bobbie notices a story about their father being imprisoned. She discusses this with her mother, who finally discloses that he has been falsely convicted of being a spy and selling state secrets. Mrs Waterbury speculates that a jealous colleague of his may be behind it. Bobbie again contacts the gentleman and asks him to help; he informs her that since meeting them and reading about the case, he has been convinced of their father's innocence.

Later a group of youths are engaged in a paper chase, which the children observe, and one boy injures his leg in a railway tunnel. Helped by the children, he is taken to their house to recuperate from his injuries. The gentleman visits their home and reveals that the boy is his grandson, Jim, and thanks the family for looking after him. Jim and Bobbie grow close during his recuperation and promise to write to each other when he goes home.

After Jim leaves, the children remark on their long absence from waving at the train passengers and resolve to go to the railway the following morning. When they do so, all the passengers wave at them, and the gentleman gestures to a newspaper. Later, Bobbie excuses herself from her lessons and walks down to the station, where Perks hints that something special has happened. Confused, Bobbie stands on the platform, where in the lingering smoke she sees her father, who has just alighted after being exonerated and released from prison. She runs to greet him shouting "Daddy; my Daddy!". They return together to Three Chimneys, where Bobbie leaves him to a private reunion with his wife.

=== End credits ===
The entire cast break the fourth wall and perform a curtain call as the credits roll. The camera moves slowly along a railway track towards a steam engine which is decked in flags, in front of which all of the cast are assembled, waving and cheering to the camera. At the start of the credit sequence, a voice can be heard shouting "Thank you, Mr Forbes" to acknowledge producer Bryan Forbes. At the end, Bobbie Waterbury holds up a small slate on which "The End" is written in chalk.

== Cast ==
- Jenny Agutter as Roberta 'Bobbie' Waterbury
- Sally Thomsett as Phyllis Waterbury
- Gary Warren as Peter Waterbury
- Dinah Sheridan as Mother, Mrs Waterbury
- Bernard Cribbins as Albert Perks
- William Mervyn as the Old Gentleman
- Iain Cuthbertson as Father, Charles Waterbury
- Peter Bromilow as Doctor Forrest
- Ann Lancaster as Ruth
- Gordon Whiting as the Russian
- Beatrix Mackey as Aunt Emma
- Deddie Davies as Mrs Nell Perks
- David Lodge as Band Leader
- Christopher Witty as Jim
- Brenda Cowling as Mrs Hilda Viney
- Paddy Ward as Cart Man
- Erik Chitty as the Photographer
- Sally James as Maid
- Dominic Allan as CID Man
- Andy Wainwright as Desk Sergeant
- Lionel Jeffries as Malcolm (voice)
- Richard Leech as Doctor (voice)
- Amelia Bayntun as the Cook (uncredited)
- Bob Cryer (Chairman of the Keighley and Worth Valley Railway (K&WVR)) as the guard of the train carrying Mr Waterbury (uncredited)
- Paul Luty as Malcolm (uncredited)
- Graham Mitchell (K&WVR Guard) as the Train Guard (uncredited).

== Production ==
=== Earlier adaptations ===
The novel was adapted for radio in 1943.

It was serialised for television in 1951, as a part of Children's Hour, starring Jean Anderson. The 1951 script was reworked and adapted for television again in 1957, with location scenes filmed on the now-closed Cranleigh line. Jean Anderson reprised her role as Mother.

In 1968, a seven-part television series was made with a fully-revised script. The series starred Jenny Agutter and the fledgling Keighley & Worth Valley Railway, with its station at Oakworth, was used for location scenes.

=== Development ===
Lionel Jeffries read the book for the first time when he was returning to Britain by ship from the US to film Chitty Chitty Bang Bang, in which he appeared as an actor. He had lost his own books and borrowed The Railway Children from his 13-year-old daughter Martha. He loved it, although he admitted "my personality is so different from the quiet romance of the story." However, he said "I found the climate of the... story just right for me, a way in which to start entertaining people and help not destroy our industry. There are hardly any films being made for children and for middle aged and older age groups. I thought this could be one."

He bought a six-month option on the film rights for £300 and wrote a screenplay. "I've kept to the story," said Jeffries. "It would be an imposition not to – after all, E. Nesbit's survived 50 years." Jeffries succeeded in attracting financing from Bryan Forbes at EMI Films, who was interested in making family films. Forbes suggested Jeffries direct. "I knew there were slight bets among the technical staff as to how long I'd last," said Jeffries later. The film was part of Forbes's initial (and, it turned out, only) slate for films at EMI.

Jeffries later said "I knew we were taking a big, calculated risk in swimming against the permissive mainstream with such a story. All I could do was make it as honestly as possible: a Victorian documentary."

=== Casting ===
Sally Thomsett was cast as the 11-year-old Phyllis, (Note: The children's ages are given in the original text as 12 for Bobbie and 10 for Peter, with Phyllis being the youngest.) despite being 20 years old at the time. Her contract forbade her to reveal her true age during the making of the film and she was also not allowed to be seen smoking or drinking during the shoot. Seventeen-year-old Jenny Agutter played her older sister, Roberta, and Gary Warren played their brother, Peter.

Agutter had previously played the same role in the 1968 BBC Television adaptation of the story. Dinah Sheridan was cast as Mother and Bernard Cribbins as Perks the porter. Jeffries admitted he was tempted to play the role of Perks himself, but eventually decided to cast Cribbins "because of his lovely calm comedy."

=== Filming locations ===
Inspired by the BBC's 1968 adaptation, Lionel Jeffries used the Keighley & Worth Valley Railway (KWVR) as the backdrop for the film, referring to it as per the original story as the "Great Northern & Southern Railway". At the time of filming, there were still very few heritage railways in Britain and only the KWVR could provide a tunnel, which is important in a number of scenes. The tunnel is a lot shorter in reality than it appears in the film, for which a temporary extension was made using canvas covers.

A number of different locations were employed for various scenes:

- The house called "Three Chimneys" is in Oxenhope, just north of the railway station.
- The Bronte Parsonage in Haworth was used as the location for Doctor Forrest's surgery.
- The scenes of the children sitting on a bridge were filmed at Wycoller, near Colne.
- Mytholmes Tunnel, near Haworth, and the railway line running through it, were used extensively in the film. This included being the location for the paper chase scene, as well as the famous landslide scene, in which the children warn the train about the blockage.
- The landslide sequence was filmed in a cutting on the Oakworth side of Mytholmes Tunnel and the fields of long grass, where the children waved to the trains, are situated on the Haworth side of the tunnel.
- The scenes in the Waterburys' London house, before their move to Yorkshire, were filmed at 4 Gainsborough Gardens in Hampstead, north-west London.

A leaflet, entitled "The Railway Children Walks", is available from KWVR stations or the Haworth Tourist Information Centre.

=== Locomotives and rolling stock ===
Four of the already-preserved steam locomotives based on the KWVR were chosen for use in the film's production in relation to role. MSC67 was the local steam engine, newly arrived 5775 (L89) as the Old Gentleman's engine, 52044 (preserved as L&Y 957) as The Green Dragon express and 4744 (69523/1744) as the Scotch Flyer.

The steam engines were painted in period-inspired liveries for the filming:

- 5775 in brown, reminiscent of the Stroudley livery of the London, Brighton & South Coast Railway. It is still at the KWVR and is currently undergoing an overhaul with a plan to return her to service once it is completed.
- 957 in apple green, similar to liveries used by the North Eastern Railway, Great Northern Railway, and London & North Eastern Railway. It is also still at the KWVR and has returned to service after overhaul in its film guise.
- 4744 and MSC67 in plain black, as used by most railway companies in Britain at one time or another. 67 is now at the Middleton Railway in Leeds on display, having last operated in 2012. 4744 is now with the North Norfolk Railway at Sheringham; it is undergoing a ten-yearly overhaul.

A wide variety of vintage rolling stock was used in the film, including examples from the Metropolitan and London and North Eastern railways. Although different carriages appeared in different liveries, the dominant one is white and maroon, which is reminiscent of the livery of the Caledonian Railway. The most important carriage in the film, the Old Gentleman's Saloon, was a North Eastern Railway Director's Saloon; it has also been used for the more recent stage production adaptation of the book. Along with all the other carriages seen in the film, it is still at the KWVR but tend to be used at special events only, due to their age.

== Release ==
=== Box office ===
The film was the ninth most popular film at the British box office in 1971 and recouped its cost in that country alone. It was one of the few financial successes of Bryan Forbes' regime at EMI Films. By June 1972, it had earned EMI a profit of £52,000.

In 1994, Forbes claimed the film had made over £1 million in profit.

=== Critical reception ===
Since its release, the film has received universally positive reviews. On the review aggregator website Rotten Tomatoes, 100% of 16 critics' reviews are positive, with an average rating of 8.3/10.

=== Home media ===
A 40th anniversary Blu-ray and DVD was released on 5 May 2010, with a new digitally remastered print. It includes new interviews with Sally Thomsett, Jenny Agutter and Bernard Cribbins. The planned commentary by director Lionel Jeffries was not completed, due to his death in February 2010.

=== Awards and nominations ===
The Railway Children received three nominations for awards at the 24th British Academy Film Awards ceremony. Bernard Cribbins was nominated in the category of Best Supporting Actor. However, in a category also featuring John Mills, Colin Welland and Gig Young, the award went to Welland for his role in the film Kes.

Sally Thomsett received a nomination for Best Newcomer in a Leading Role but again lost out to an actor from Kes, in this case Dai Bradley. Johnny Douglas was also nominated for the Anthony Asquith Award for Film Music but the award was won by American Burt Bacharach for his film score for Butch Cassidy and the Sundance Kid.

=== Merchandise ===
Hornby Railways produced a 00 gauge set of the train from the film. It had a London, Midland and Scottish Railway 0–6–0 tank shunting locomotive in GN&SR livery with Synchrosmoke, two period coaches, an oval of track and a station.

Bachmann Branchline currently produces a 00 gauge train pack from the film, albeit a more accurate set. It includes a GWR 5700 Class locomotive in GN&SR's brown livery, two LMS Period I carriages in GN&SR's maroon and white livery, and a model of the Oakworth station building.

In 2010, to coincide with the 40th anniversary, a book was published entitled The Making of the Railway Children by Jim Shipley, a former volunteer station master of Oakworth station. It detailed events that took place during filming and interviews from local people associated with it. In November 2012, a second updated version was printed with added information, in particular about Gary Warren, who withdrew from the public eye in the mid-1970s, after retiring from acting. He had been tracked down by a member of the official Catweazle fan club and the author had permission to write a more updated version of what had happened to him.

=== BBFC complaint ===
In 2013, the British Board of Film Classification (BBFC) released a statement saying that they had received and evaluated a complaint about the film in that it encouraged children to trespass on the railway tracks. The BBFC noted that the children did trespass on the line, but only to warn an approaching train of the danger of a landslide on the track ahead. They had, however, in an earlier scene walked along the track simply to get to the station.

The BBFC also pointed out that the film was set in Edwardian times when access to railway lines was not under the same restrictions as modern times.

== Legacy ==
The film has left a lasting impression on the British film industry and audiences. In 1999, the British Film Institute (BFI) put The Railway Children in 66th place in its list of the Top 100 British films of all time. Five years later, the film magazine Total Film named it the 46th greatest British film of the 20th century.

In 2005, the BFI included it in their list of 'The 50 films you should see by the age of 14'. In 2008, the film made it onto Channel 4's list of the 100 Greatest Family Films at number 30, just ahead of Monsters, Inc. and just behind Men in Black and Ghostbusters.

On 28 March 2010, the Bradford International Film Festival concluded with a new restoration of The Railway Children film with the 40th anniversary digital premiere.

Jenny Agutter also starred in a new TV adaptation of The Railway Children in 2000, in the role of Mother. Much of the publicity focused on Agutter's involvement in both films, which were made a generation apart.

In 2021, BBC Radio 4 broadcast The Saving of Albert Perks, a monologue by Bernard Cribbins in which the now adult Roberta returns to Oakworth with two Jewish refugee children who have escaped Nazi Germany on the Kindertransport.

== Sequel ==
In May 2021, a sequel titled The Railway Children Return, starring Jenny Agutter, started filming in and around Oakworth. It was released on 15 July 2022.

== See also ==
- BFI Top 100 British films
- Edith Nesbit
- The Railway Children (book)
- The Railway Children (2000 film).
