= Jenny Agutter =

English actress (born 1952)

Jenny Agutter OBE
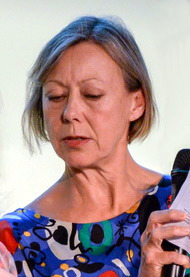
- Agutter in 2014
- Born: Jennifer Ann Agutter; 20 December 1952 (age 73); Taunton, Somerset, England
- Occupation: Actor
- Years active: 1964–present
- Spouse: Johan Tham (m. 1990; died 2025)
- Children: 1
- Website: jennyagutter.net

Jennifer Ann Agutter (born 20 December 1952) is an English actress. She began her career as a child actress in 1964, appearing in East of Sudan, Star!, and two adaptations of The Railway Children: the BBC's 1968 television serial and the 1970 film version. In 1971 she also starred in the critically acclaimed film Walkabout and the TV film The Snow Goose, for which she won an Emmy Award for Outstanding Supporting Actress in a Drama.

She relocated to the United States in 1974 to pursue a Hollywood career and subsequently appeared in Logan's Run (1976), Amy (1981), An American Werewolf in London (1981), and Child's Play 2 (1990). During the same period, Agutter continued appearing in high-profile British films, such as The Eagle Has Landed (1976), Equus (1977)—for which she won a BAFTA Award for Best Actress in a Supporting Role—and The Riddle of the Sands (1979). In 1981, she co-starred in The Survivor, an Australian adaptation of the James Herbert novel by that name, and was nominated for an AACTA Award for Best Actress in a Leading Role.

After returning to Britain in the early 1990s to pursue family life, Agutter shifted her focus to television, appearing in the 2000 version of the television adaptation of The Railway Children, this time as the mother, and since 2012 she has had an ongoing role in the BBC's Call the Midwife. Her film work in recent years includes The Avengers (2012) and Captain America: The Winter Soldier (2014), and in 2022, Agutter returned to the world of The Railway Children once more by reprising her role from the 1970 film 52 years later in a sequel, The Railway Children Return.

Agutter is widowed and has one adult son. She supports several charitable causes, mostly ones related to cystic fibrosis, a condition from which her niece suffers, and for her service to those causes was appointed Officer of the Order of the British Empire (OBE) in the 2012 Birthday Honours.

== Early life ==
Agutter was born on 20 December 1952 in Taunton, Somerset, England. She is the daughter of Derek Agutter (an entertainments manager in the British Army) and Catherine, and was raised Roman Catholic. She has Irish ancestry on her mother's side. As a child, she lived in Singapore, Dhekelia (Cyprus) and Kuala Lumpur (Malaya). She attended Elmhurst Ballet School, a boarding school, from ages eight to sixteen. She then attended Arts Educational School for a couple of months, before dropping out to star in The Railway Children.

== Career ==
=== Television and film ===
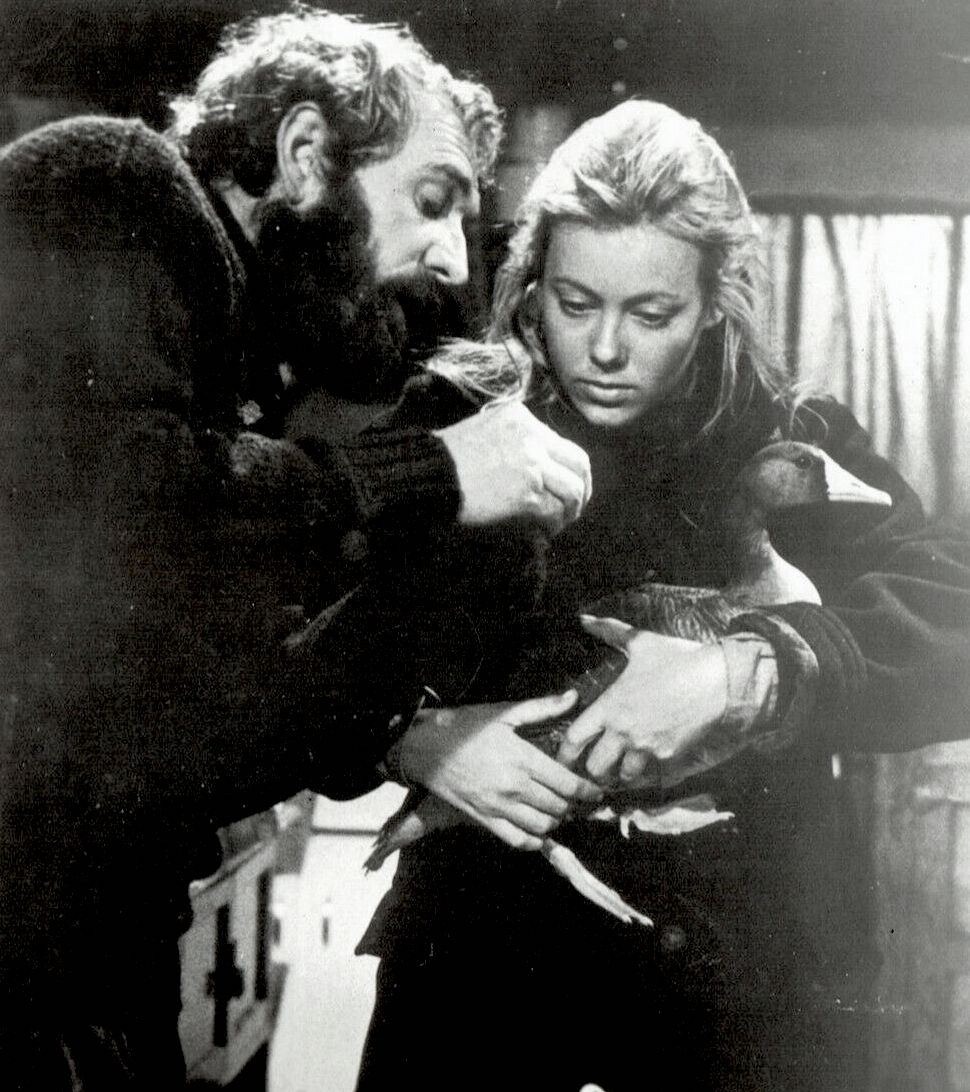
Agutter and Richard Harris in The Snow Goose (1971)

Agutter became known to television audiences for her role in the twice-weekly BBC series The Newcomers, in which she played Kirsty, the daughter of the new managing director of Eden Brothers, the fictional firm that is at the centre of the series. Agutter could appear only during school holidays. At this stage of her career, she was listed in credits as "Jennifer". In 1966, she portrayed a ballet pupil in the Disney TV film Ballerina. In 1968, she was featured in the lavish big-budget 20th Century Fox film musical Star! which featured Julie Andrews as Gertrude Lawrence; Agutter played Lawrence's neglected daughter Pamela. Later, she played Roberta in a BBC adaptation of The Railway Children (1968) and in Lionel Jeffries's 1970 film of the book. She followed this with a more serious role in the thriller I Start Counting (1969). She also won an Emmy as supporting actress for her television role as Fritha in a British television adaptation of The Snow Goose (1971).

Agutter then moved into more adult roles, beginning with Walkabout (1971), in which she played a teenage schoolgirl who is lost with her younger brother in the Australian outback. She auditioned for the role in 1967, but funding problems delayed filming until 1969. The delay meant Agutter was sixteen at the time of filming, which allowed the director to include nude scenes. Among them was a five-minute skinny-dipping scene, which was cut from the original US release. She said at the 2005 Bradford Film Festival at the National Media Museum that she was shocked by the film's explicitness, but remained on good terms with director Nicolas Roeg.

Agutter moved to Hollywood at twenty-one and appeared in a number of films over the next decade, including The Eagle Has Landed (1976), Logan's Run (1976), Equus (1977) (for which she won a BAFTA as Best Supporting Actress), An American Werewolf in London (1981), and an adaptation of the James Herbert novel The Survivor (1981). Agutter has commented that the innocence of the characters she played in her early films, combined with the costumes and nudity in later adult roles such as Logan's Run, Equus, and An American Werewolf in London, are "perfect fantasy fodder".

In 1990, Agutter returned to the UK to concentrate on family life and her focus shifted towards British television. During the 1990s, she was cast in an adaptation of Jeffrey Archer's novel Not a Penny More, Not a Penny Less and as the scandalous Idina Hatton in the BBC miniseries The Buccaneers, inspired by Edith Wharton's unfinished 1938 book, and made guest appearances in television series such as Red Dwarf and Heartbeat. In 2000, she starred in a third adaptation of The Railway Children, produced by Carlton TV, this time playing the mother. Since then Agutter has had recurring roles in several television series including Spooks, The Invisibles, Monday Monday and The Alan Clark Diaries. In 2012 Agutter resumed her Hollywood career, appearing as a member of the World Security Council in the blockbuster film The Avengers; she reprised her role in Captain America: The Winter Soldier (2014). Since 2012, Agutter has played Sister Julienne in the BBC television drama series Call the Midwife.

=== Theatre ===
Agutter has appeared in numerous theatre productions since her stage debut in 1970, including stints at the National Theatre in 1972–73, the title role in a version of Hedda Gabler at the Roundhouse in 1980 and with the Royal Shakespeare Company in 1982–83, playing Alice in Arden of Faversham, Regan in King Lear and Fontanelle in Lear. In 1987–88, Agutter played the role of Pat Green in the Broadway production of the Hugh Whitemore play Breaking the Code, about computer pioneer Alan Turing. In 1995 she was in an RSC production of Love's Labour's Lost staged in Tokyo. She is also a patron of the Shakespeare Schools Festival, a charity that enables school children in the UK to perform Shakespeare in professional theatres.

=== Audio ===
In 2008, she also guest-starred in the Doctor Who audio drama The Bride of Peladon and played an outlawed scientist in The Minister of Chance. She has appeared as a guest star character ("Fiona Templeton") in the Radio 4 comedy Ed Reardon's Week.

=== Music ===
Agutter appears on the 1990 Prefab Sprout song "Wild Horses", speaking the words "I want to have you".

== Personal life ==
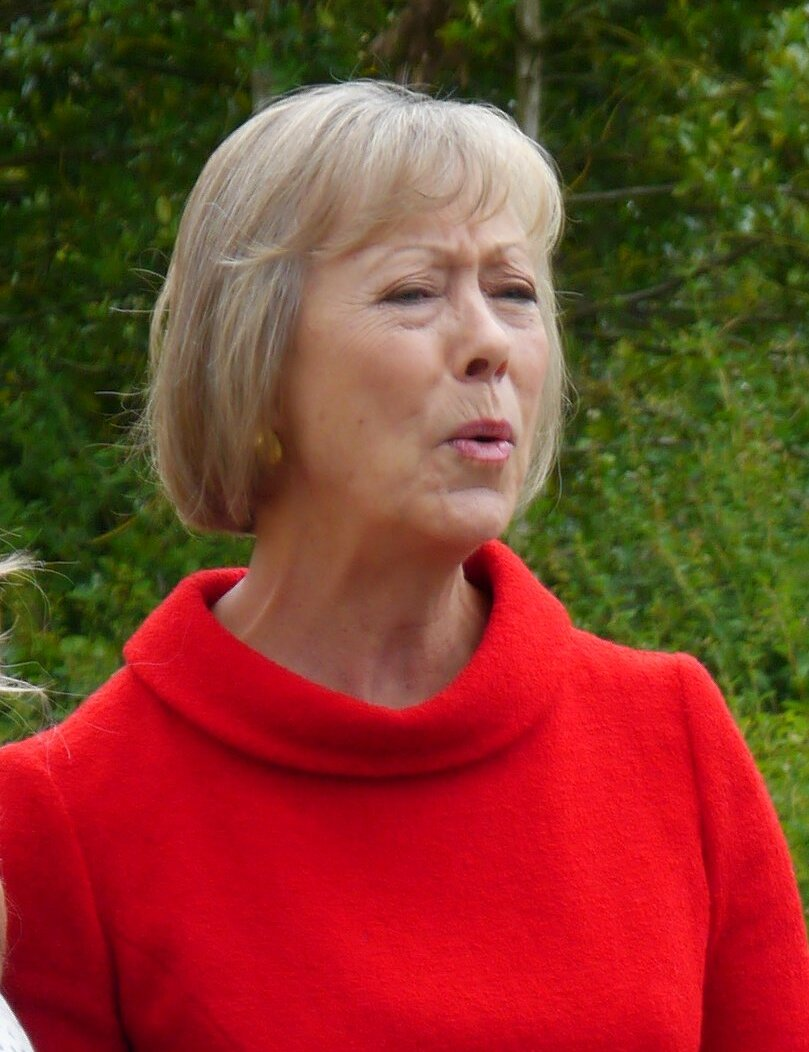
Agutter in 2022

At a 1989 arts festival in Bath, Somerset, Agutter met Johan Tham, a Swedish hotelier who was a director of Cliveden Hotel in Buckinghamshire. They were married from August 1990, until his death in 2025. Their son was born in 1990. As of 2014, Agutter was living in London, but has a keen interest in Cornwall and once owned a second home there on the Trelowarren Estate.

She was appointed an Officer of the Order of the British Empire (OBE) in the 2012 Birthday Honours, for her charitable services. In August 2014, Agutter was one of 200 public figures who were signatories to a letter to The Guardian expressing their hope that Scotland would vote to remain part of the United Kingdom in September 2014's referendum on that issue.

Agutter has been attached to several causes throughout her career. She has been involved in raising awareness of the illness cystic fibrosis, which she believes was responsible for the deaths of two of her siblings. Her niece has the disease. At Agutter's suggestion, an episode of Call the Midwife focused on cystic fibrosis. She has also worked in support of charities, in particular the Cystic Fibrosis Trust, of which she is a patron (she is also a carrier of the genetic mutation).

== Filmography ==
=== Film ===
Year	Title	Roles	Notes
1964	East of Sudan	Asua	
1966	A Man Could Get Killed	Linda Frazier	
1968	Gates to Paradise	Maud	
1968	Star!	Pamela Roper	
1969	I Start Counting	Wynne	
1970	The Railway Children	Roberta "Bobbie" Waterbury	
1971	Walkabout	Girl	
1976	Logan's Run	Jessica 6	
1976	The Eagle Has Landed	Molly Prior	
1977	Equus	Jill Mason	BAFTA Award for Best Actress in a Supporting Role
1977	The Man in the Iron Mask	Louise de la Vallière	
1978	China 9, Liberty 37	Catherine Sebanek	
1978	Dominique	Ann Ballard	a.k.a. Dominique Is Dead
1979	The Riddle of the Sands	Clara	
1979	Mayflower: The Pilgrims' Adventure	Priscilla Mullins	
1980	Sweet William	Ann Walton	
1981	Amy	Amy Medford	
1981	The Survivor	Hobbs	Nominated – Australian Film Institute Award for Best Actress in a Leading Role
1981	An American Werewolf in London	Nurse Alex Price	Nominated – Saturn Award for Best Actress
1984	Secret Places	Miss Lowrie	
1989	Dark Tower	Carolyn Page	
1990	King of the Wind	Hannah Coke	
1990	Child's Play 2	Joanne Simpson	
1990	Darkman	Burn Doctor	Uncredited Cameo
1992	Freddie as F.R.O.7	Daffers	
1995	Blue Juice	Mary Fenton	
2001	The Parole Officer	Victor's Wife	
2002	At Dawning	Escaping woman	Short film
2004	Number One Longing, Number Two Regret	Kenosha	
2006	Heroes and Villains	June	
2007	Irina Palm	Jane	
2007	The Magic Door	Black Witch	
2009	Glorious 39	Maud Keyes	
2010	Burke and Hare	Lucy	
2011	Outside Bet	Shirley Baxter	
2011	Golden Brown	Sarah	
2012	The Avengers	Councilwoman Hawley	
2014	Captain America: The Winter Soldier	Councilwoman Hawley	
2015	Queen of the Desert	Florence Bell	
2015	Tin	Marjorie Dawson	
2018	Sometimes Always Never	Margaret	
2022	The Railway Children Return	Roberta "Bobbie" Waterbury	

=== Television ===
Year	Title	Role	Notes
1965	The Newcomers	Kirsty Kerr	BBC TV series
1965	Alexander Graham Bell	Grace Hubbard	BBC TV series
1966	Ballerina	Ingrid Jensen	Two-part episode of Disneyland; credited as Jennifer Agutter
1967	Boy Meets Girl	Joanna	BBC TV; Series 1, Episode 10: "Long After Summer"
1968	The Railway Children	Roberta Faraday	BBC TV series
1970	The Great Inimitable Mr. Dickens	Young Maria Beadnall / Mary Hogarth / Ellen Ternan	TV film
1971	The Snow Goose	Fritha	Emmy Award for Outstanding Supporting Actress in a Drama
1972	The Wild Duck	Hedvig	BBC TV "Play of the Month" broadcast on BBC 1 on 19 March
1972	A War of Children	Maureen Tomelty	American (CBS) TV film set in Northern Ireland during The Troubles
1972	Shelley	Mary Shelley	BBC TV movie
1974	Thriller	Dominie Lanceford	Series 2, Episode 3: "Kiss Me and Die"
1975	Shadows	Sue	Season One, Episode Four: "The Waiting Room"
1977	The Six Million Dollar Man	Leah Russell	"Deadly Countdown" Parts 1 & 2
1980	Beulah Land	Lizzie Corlay	TV mini-series
1985	Love's Labour's Lost	Rosaline	BBC TV film
1985	Magnum, P.I.	Krista Villeroch	Season 5, Episode 96: "Little Games"
1985	Silas Marner	Nancy Lammeter	BBC TV film
1986	The Twilight Zone	Morgan le Fay	Season 1, Episode 24: "The Last Defender of Camelot"
1986	Murder, She Wrote	Margo Claymore	Season 3, Episode 4: "One White Rose for Death"
1987	The Grand Knockout Tournament	Herself	TV special
1987	The Twilight Zone	Jacinda	Season 2, Episode 13: "Voices in the Earth"
1989	The Equalizer	Lauren Demeter	Episode: "The Visitation"
1990	Not a Penny More, Not a Penny Less	Jill Albery	BBC TV mini-series
1990	TECX	Kate Milverton	ITV series
1991	Boon	Melissa Dewar	Season 6, Episode 1: "Help Me Make It Through The Night"
1991	The Diamond Brothers: South by South East	Louise Meyer	CITV mini-series
1992	Dream On	Ellen	Season 3, Episode 22: "No Deposit, No Return"
1993	Red Dwarf	Professor Mamet	"Psirens"
1994	Heartbeat	Susannah Temple-Richards	Series 4, Episode 8: "Fair Game"
1994	Love Hurts	Jeanette Summers	Season 3, Episode 9 Season 3, Episode 10
1995	The Buccaneers	Idina Hatton	BBC TV mini-series
1996	September	Isobel Balmerino	TV movie
2000	The Railway Children	Mother	ITV
2002	Spooks	Tessa Phillips	BBC TV series
2003	Britain's Finest	Presenter	Channel 5 Series 1, Episode 2: "Gardens"
2004	The Alan Clark Diaries	Jane Clark	BBC TV series
2004	The Inspector Lynley Mysteries	Jemma Sanderson	BBC TV Series 3, Episode 3
2004	Agatha Christie's Marple	Agnes Crackenthorpe	Series 1, Episode 3: "4.50 from Paddington"
2005	New Tricks	Yvonne Barrie	BBC TV Series 2, Episode 1
2006	Agatha Christie's Poirot	Adela Marchmont	Season 10, Episode 4: "Taken at the Flood"
2007	Diamond Geezer	Vanessa	ITV series
2008	The Invisibles	Barbara Riley	BBC TV series
2009	Monday Monday	Jenny Mountfield	ITV1 TV series
2010	Midsomer Murders	Isobel Chettham	ITV1 TV series, Episode 72: "The Creeper"
2012–present	Call the Midwife	Sister Julienne	BBC TV series
2026	Call the Midwife: Sisters in Arms	Sister Julienne (Voice only)	Upcoming BBC Prequel series

== Awards and nominations ==
Year	Award	Category	Work	Result	Ref.
1972	24th Primetime Emmy Awards	Outstanding Supporting Actress in a Drama Series	Hallmark Hall of Fame (Episode: "The Snow Goose")	Won	
1977	31st British Academy Film Awards	BAFTA Award for Best Actress in a Supporting Role	Equus	Won	
1981	Academy of Science Fiction, Fantasy and Horror Films	Saturn Award for Best Actress	An American Werewolf in London	Nominated	
1981	1981 Australian Film Institute Awards	AACTA Award for Best Actress in a Leading Role	The Survivor	Nominated	
2022	TV Choice Awards	Best Actress	Call the Midwife	Won	
2022	TV Times Awards	Favourite Dramatic Performance	Call the Midwife	Nominated	
2023	TV Choice Awards	Best Actress	Call the Midwife	Nominated	
2023	TV Times Awards	Favourite Actor (Drama)	Call the Midwife	Nominated	
