= Julian Woolford =

British theatre director

- Education: University of Kent; Bristol Old Vic Theatre School
- Occupations: director; writer; educationalist
- Website: julianwoolford.info

Julian Woolford is a British theatre director, writer and educationalist based in the UK and working internationally. He is currently head of musical theatre at Guildford School of Acting, the conservatoire based at the University of Surrey.

Previously he was artistic director at Sevenoaks Playhouse, the Global Search for New Musicals at the International Festival of Musical Theatre, and associate director of the Queen's Theatre, Hornchurch.

== Early life and education ==
He was educated at the University of Kent and Bristol Old Vic Theatre School.

== Sevenoaks Playhouse ==
As artistic director of the Sevenoaks Playhouse he directed Vita & Virginia, The Railway Children, Wallflowering, Kiss of the Spiderwoman (the play), The Wind in the Willows and Jeffrey Hatcher's version of The Turn of the Screw. During Woolford's tenure Sevenoaks Playhouse won an award of £100,000 from the Arts Council and the 2006 Best Of Business Award for Best Marketing Campaign.

== Writer ==
As a writer, his plays and musicals have been performed around the world. His stage adaptation of Andrew Neiderman's novel The Devil's Advocate had a highly successful tour of the Netherlands. Liberace Live from Heaven starred pianist Bobby Crush and had voice-over roles performed by Stephen Fry and Victoria Wood and played at the Leicester Square Theatre, at the Edinburgh Fringe Festival and toured New Zealand.

Woolford writes book and lyrics to music by Richard John. Their musical The Teddy Bears' Picnic toured the UK. Their musical versions of The Wind in the Willows and The Railway Children which were both produced at Sevenoaks Playhouse. The Railway Children is published by Samuel French and has been produced many times by community theatre companies around the world. Their 10-minute musical Terminal Four Play was commissioned by Theatre503 as part of their Urban Scrawl project.

Their musical Comrade Rockstar, based on the life of Dean Reed, was produced in concert at GSA with a West End cast at the Ivy Theatre Guildford and live-streamed worldwide. They were commissioned by the Estate of Lionel Bart (author of Oliver!) to completely rewrite the book for Bart's Twang!!, first produced by GSA and subsequently at London's Union Theatre.

Woolford's revue, Speak Low based on Kurt Weill and Lotte Lenya's writings, was produced by GSA. For BBC Radio 3 he wrote Broadway Hall of Fame: Cole Porter and Broadway Hall of Fame: Leonard Bernstein, which were both produced at the Palace Theatre, London. His musical Oh Carol! won the Covent Garden Festival Search for a New Musical. His play with music, BlueBirds, was first produced at the Cochrane Theatre, London and has had revivals at the Kenneth More Theatre and Above the Stag in London; B.Y.M (Beautiful Young Man) was presented as part of the Pride Encore Benefit Season in New York and his first play The Oedipus Complex, premiered at Bristol New Vic.

He co-wrote the musicals Let Him Have Justice and The Bakewell Bake-Off (published by Concord). His many scripts for Christmas productions include Aladdin, Dick Whittington, Cinderella and Snow White for the Queen's Theatre, Hornchurch, Snow White for Bournemouth Pavilion and The Snow Queen for Theatre North and the scripts for Peter Pan and Cinderella at the Lighthouse (Poole).

He is the author of the book How Musicals Work (Nick Hern Books), which is the standard textbook for musical theatre creation and writing, and of Rodgers and Hammerstein's The Sound of Music (Routledge Fourth Wall).

== Director ==
In 2015 Woolford became the first person to direct a commercial musical in Egypt when he staged The Sound of Music in a 2,000-seater tent in the desert outside Cairo, with a West End cast.

London productions: 2 Boys in a Bed on a Cold Winter's Night (Arts Theatre, West End); Liberace Live from Heaven at Leicester Square Theatre; [The Musical of Musicals, (Sound Theatre & King's Head); BlueBirds (Cochrane Theatre & Above The Stag); Let Him Have Justice (Cochrane Theatre); Jacques Brel is Alive and Well and Living in Paris (King's Head); The Bakewell Bake-Off (Landor Theatre).

UK National tours: Oklahoma! (2010); South Pacific (2007/8); Carousel (2004); Fiddler on the Roof (2003 & 2008) and Murdered to Death

Overseas: The Sound of Music (Cairo & Beirut premieres); The Importance of Being Earnest and Mrs. Warren's Profession at The English Theatre of Hamburg; Two Pianos Four Hands; I Do! I Do! and Deadly Murder (Vienna); …and the Pursuit of Happiness (Off-Broadway); Wuthering Heights (European tour).

Regional Theatre: Wallflowering; Vita & Virginia; Kiss of the Spiderwoman; The Turn of the Screw; The Railway Children, The Wind in the Willows (Sevenoaks Playhouse); Dames at Sea; The Turn of the Screw; The Sound of Music; The Fifteen Streets; Aladdin; Dick Whittington; Cinderella; Who's Under Where?; The Underworld Project (Queen's Theatre Hornchurch); The Bed Before Yesterday (Mill at Sonning); Me and My Girl (Devonshire Park Eastbourne); The Oedipus Complex; Oedipus Rex (Bristol Old Vic) and The Comedy of Errors (Worthing).

== Awards ==
In addition to the Awards at Sevenoaks Playhouse, he is also a winner of the Stage One Award for new producers and produced the 2009 national tour of Totally Looped.
