= Libby Morris =

Canadian actress (born 1932)

Libby Morris (born 1932 in Winnipeg) is a Canadian singer, comedienne and actress. She appeared in several CBC radio shows of the 1950s and moved into TV and film from the 1960s onward after she moved to London, England. She became a very well known theatre actor and cabaret performer as well as starring in her own TV show.

== Family ==
Morris and her husband Murray Kash raised their daughter, Marcia Kash, in London, where they lived for many years. In the 80s she and Kash separated and he returned to Canada where he remained until he died in March 2009. They often participated in fundraising shows for the Stars Foundation for Cerebral Palsy. Libby has a number of recordings available on vinyl and CD including her show "Edith Piaf Je Vous Aime".

== Radio appearances ==
- 1955 The Jack Jackson Show
- 1956 Meet Libby Morris
- 1956 Two's Company

== Filmography ==
=== Film ===
Year	Title	Role	Notes
1960	Climb Up the Wall	Herself	
1961	Three on a Spree	Trixie	
1962	Tiara Tahiti	Adele Franklin	
1964	Promise Her Anything	Clinic Mother	
1967	Two for the Road	American Lady	Uncredited
1967	The Plank	Tourist	
1969	The Adding Machine	Ethel	
1969	A Talent for Loving	Jacaranda	
1985	Not Quite Paradise	Mrs. Schwartz	
2006	United 93	Hilda Marcin	

== TV appearances ==
Year	Title	Role	Notes
1955	The Jack Jackson Show		
1961	Bresslaw And Friends		
1962	Space Patrol	Marla / Gabbler / Cassiopeia	Voice, 34 episodes
1967	Something Special	(Kathy Kirby Special tv. show), BBC2	1 episode
1971	Alexander the Greatest	Fay Green	6 episodes
1979	Give Us A Clue	Guest	Multiple episodes
1971	David Nixons magic box		
1983	Pure Libby	Self, performer	Channel 4
1989	Mike and Angelo	Nancy Mancini	10 episodes
