= Alexander the Greatest =

- Genre: Sitcom
- Created by: Bernard Kops
- Starring: Gary Warren; Sydney Tafler; Libby Morris; Stella Moray; Adrienne Posta
- Country of origin: United Kingdom
- No. of series: 2
- No. of episodes: 13

Production
- Running time: 30 minutes
- Production company: ATV

Original release
- Network: ITV
- Release: 15 July 1971 – 31 May 1972

Alexander the Greatest is a British sitcom that aired on ITV from 1971 to 1972. Starring Gary Warren, it was written by Bernard Kops and made for the ITV network by ATV.

== Cast ==
- Gary Warren – Alexander Green
- Sydney Tafler – Joe Green
- Libby Morris – Fay Green (series 1)
- Stella Moray – Fay Green (series 2)
- Adrienne Posta – Renata Green
- Peter Birrel – Murray (series 1)
- Cyril Shaps – Barney (series 1)
- Vic Wise – Archie (series 1)
- David Lodge – Sam (series 2)

== Plot ==
Alexander Green is a 16-year-old boy, who lives in Golders Green in London and who wants to leave his middle-class Jewish home. He is based on the writer's fourteen-year-old son Adam. Alexander's parents, Joe and Fay Green, try to understand him and he has a sister Renata.

== Episodes ==
=== Series One (1971) ===
1. "A Week to Live" (15 July 1971)
2. "The Third World Starts Tonight" (22 July 1971)
3. "The All Night Party" (29 July 1971)
4. "The Match" (5 August 1971)
5. "The Disengagement of Murray and Renata" (12 August 1971)
6. "Happy Anniversary" (19 August 1971)

=== Series Two (1972) ===
1. "Charity Ends at Home" (1 March 1972)
2. "The New Policy" (22 March 1972)
3. "Israel Needs You" (29 March 1972)
4. "Kicking the Filthy Habit" (5 April 1972)
5. "The 21 Year Itch" (3 May 1972)
6. "Sam Leaves Home" (10 May 1972)
7. "Renata's Secret Affair" (31 May 1972)

== Archival existence ==
Copies of all 13 episodes still exist, but (as of September 2013), 11 of these are in monochrome only as the original colour tapes were wiped in the mid '70s by ATV. The only 2 episodes left in colour are numbers 1 and 3 from the first series.
