= List of As the Bell Rings (British TV series) episodes =

This is a list of episodes of the Disney Channel UK sitcom As the Bell Rings.

== Series overview ==
Series	Episodes	Originally released	
Series	Episodes	First released	Last released
1	24	2 April 2007	13 September 2007
2	9	9 January 2008	4 July 2008

== Episodes ==
=== Season 1 (2007) ===
No. overall	No. in season	Title	Original release date	Prod. code
1	1	"One Serious Sandwich"	2 April 2007	101
As Biggs isn't falling for Tinker's tricks, Tinker is trying to switch Biggs' sandwich with a CDS (certain death sandwich) that is double pepper and extra hot chili sandwich.
2	2	"Class Photo"	2 April 2007	102
The class photo is tomorrow and Danny is trying to stop everyone from dressing up.
3	3	"A Touch Of Class"	3 April 2007	103
Warren complains that he is no good with the ladies so Danny suggests he gets some good old fashioned style. Warren turns up at school the next day wearing an old fashioned suit. It is a hit with the ladies as he is being individual. The next day JJ, Danny and Tinker copy his outfit but Biggs forgets. The girls all fancy Biggs as he is being an individual.
4	4	"Valentine's Day"	3 April 2007	104
JJ is trying to go to the Valentine's Ball with Bella but she is ignoring him and wants to go with Danny. He gets Lucy together with Danny so she has no choice but to go with him.
5	5	"School Determinator"	4 April 2007	105
6	6	"Danny, Champion of the School"	4 April 2007	106
7	7	"Treasure Of Boutique"	5 April 2007	107
8	8	"The Great Indoors"	5 April 2007	108
Danny and Tinker are trying to help Reece get over his fear of the countryside for his camping trip, for a fee of course! Tinker is hiding from Rocky.
9	9	"Voice Of Love"	6 April 2007	109
JJ can't talk to Bella so he records his voice on a tape recorder to ask her out.
10	10	"Olly the Orical"	6 April 2007	110
Warren makes a machine to look into the future, which cause trouble with the gang
11	11	"Engagement Day"	9 April 2007	111
JJ brings an engagement ring to propose to Bella but it doesn't go quite as planned...
12	12	"Oh Brother!"	9 April 2007	112
JJ gets a new 80gb mp3 player and his sister Lucy wants to borrow it starting a whole sibling war...
13	13	"Warrant's Slam Dunk"	10 April 2007	113
Warren is scared of balls and enters a basketball tournament to overcome his fear.
14	14	"Study Buddies"	10 April 2007	114
Biggs and Warren become study buddies, Rocky takes over Bella's post as fashion queen when they become study buddies, which Bella is not too happy about and tries to stop this "Revolution".
15	15	"Warren Shapes Up"	11 April 2007	115
In return for Warren helping with their homework, Danny and Biggs help him get fit. When Rocky takes over the workout, you know it can only mean trouble...
16	16	"Reece The Great"	11 April 2007	116
Reece dreams of what it could be like if he was king of the school.
17	17	"The Dream Lesson"	3 September 2007	117
JJ has to learn a whole subject, so Warren puts it on CD for him to learn in his sleep.
18	18	"JJ's Hidden Talent"	4 September 2007	118
Everyone has to do a turn at the school show, but the only talent JJ has is copying other people.
19	19	"The Perfect Couple"	5 September 2007	119
Bella is getting really fed up with JJ following her around.
20	21	"Total Eclipse"	6 September 2007	120
Tinker and Danny are worried about the paranormal effects of a solar eclipse.
21	21	"Oh Romeo"	10 September 2007	121
JJ, Tinker and Reece are want to play the part of Romeo in the school play.
22	22	"The Happy Song"	11 September 2007	122
Warren tries to sing but gets it wrong.
23	23	"Bella's New Best Girlfriend"	12 September 2007	123
JJ is desperate to get close to Bella, so he dresses as a girl in order to become Bella's friend.
24	24	"Magical Source"	13 September 2007	124
JJ persuades Warren to develop a spray that makes people fall in love with each other.

=== Season 2 (2008) ===
No. overall	No. in season	Title	Original release date	Prod. code
25	1	"The Scientist's Apprentice"	9 January 2008	201
JJ sees Warren using magic. But all is not what it seems...
26	2	"The Big Shy Murderer"	2008	TBA
Lucy is challenged to stay quiet for a whole week and ends up winning.
27	3	"Monsterbrain UK"	2008	TBA
Warren is studying for the Monsterbrain UK competition. But Bip ends up entering after Warren pulls a Brain muscle.
28	4	"I Want to be famous"	2008	TBA
Christina Martin comes to the school and holds a contest for best actor. But everyone wants to join and ends up falling out of the window.
29	5	"Spot of Bother"	2008	TBA
Gabby accepts Bip's invitation to a smoothie but he get nervous and a spot on his chin and Josh's spot cream causes his face turn blue
30	6	"Let's Stick Together"	2008	TBA
After a failing attempt at sculpting, Lucy tries to create a bird sculpture but accidentally get her and the rest of the gang stuck to it!
30	7	"Gabby's Date"	2008	TBA
31	8	"Shakespeare's High School Musical"	2008	TBA
Dylan and Emma hold auditions for a female lead singer but Emma won't admit to Dylan that she wants to sing with him.
32	9	"Dude in the Iron Mask"	4 July 2008	TBA
At the Masked Ball, Bella inadvertently falls for JJ while he has a bucket on his head.
