= Peter Bromilow =

English-born actor

- in The Virginian: Journey to Scathelock (1969)
- Born: Peter Brian Bromilow; 21 April 1933; Cheshire, England
- Died: 16 October 1994 (aged 61); Los Angeles County, California, U.S.
- Occupation: Actor

Peter Brian Bromilow (21 April 1933 – 16 October 1994) was an English-born actor.

Active on stage, he made his film debut in 1967 in Camelot, playing Sir Sagramore to Vanessa Redgrave's Guenevere. In 1968 he played a memorable villain in the cult episode Six Days in the spy-fi series Department S.

He moved to Hollywood in the 1970s, and made television guest appearances on Daniel Boone, The Virginian, The Feather and Father Gang, Remington Steele and The Wonder Years. His U.S. theatre work included playing Inspector Lestrade in Sherlock's Last Case, directed by Charles Marowitz, with the Los Angeles Actors' Theatre in 1984.

== Select filmography ==
- Camelot (1967) - Sir Sagramore
- Department S (1968) - Walsham
- The Virginian (TV series) (1969) saison 8 episode 12 (Journey to Scathelock) : Captain Cornish
- The Railway Children (1970) - Doctor Forrest
- Nasty Habits (1977) - Baudouin
- Semi-Tough (1977) - Kostov's Interpreter
- The Eddie Capra Mysteries (1978) - Muldoon (Episode: "Murder on the Flip Side")
- Cheech and Chong's Next Movie (1980) - Gay Motorcyclist
- Evita Peron (1981, TV Movie) - Capt. Gayado
- Breakin' (1984) - Judge
- Hot Chili (1985) - Herr Fritz
- Club Paradise (1986) - Nigel
- Hard Ticket to Hawaii (1987) - Mr. Chang
- Programmed to Kill (1987) - Donovan
- War and Remembrance (1988, TV Mini-Series) - Cmdr. Sutherland
- Scrooged (1988) - Archbishop
- My Stepmother Is an Alien (1988) - Second in Command
- Wild at Heart (1990) - Hotel Manager
- Highlander II: The Quickening (1991) - Joe
- The Rocketeer (1991) - Nobleman
- Delirious (1991) - Auctioneer
