= Paper chase (game) =

Racing game

A paper chase (also known as a chalk chase or as hare and hounds) is an outdoor racing game with any number of players.

== Method of play ==
At the start of the game, one or two players are designated the 'hares' and are given a bag of small paper clippings known as the 'scent'. Other members of the group are the 'hounds' who will pursue them.

The 'hare' is given a head start of five to fifteen minutes, and runs ahead periodically throwing out a handful of paper shreds, which represent the scent of the hare. Just as scent is carried on the wind, so too are the bits of paper, sometimes making for a difficult game. After some designated time, the hounds must chase after the hare and attempt to catch them before they reach the ending point of the race.

The game is generally played over distance of several miles, but shorter courses can be set, or the game played according to a time limit. If the hare makes it to the finish line, they get to choose the next hare, or to be the hare themselves. Similarly, the person who catches the hare gets to choose the next hare.

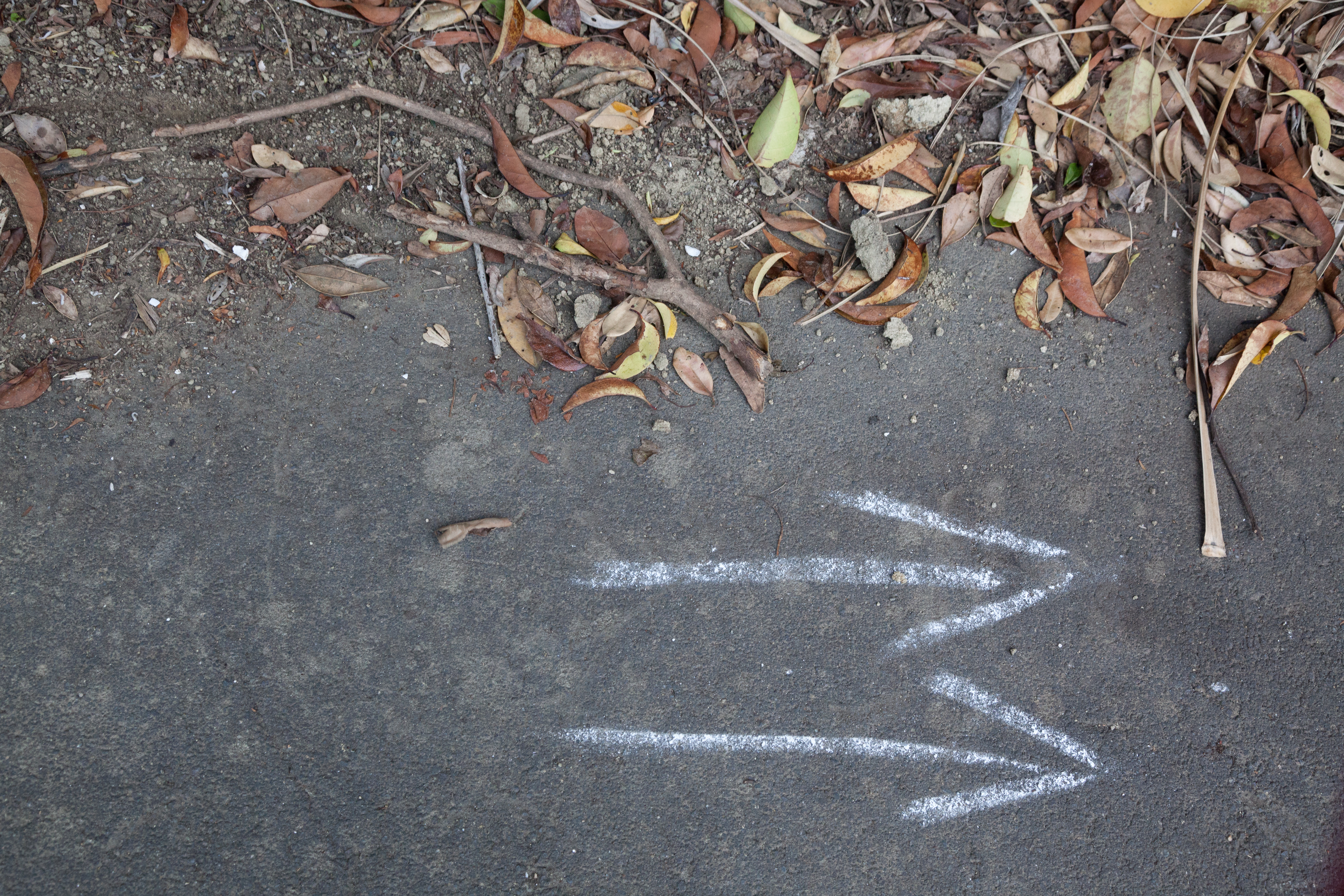
Two chalk arrows on the ground

The game may also be played with a piece of chalk instead of paper, where the hares leave marks on walls, stones, fence posts or similar surfaces.

== History ==
A game called "Hunt the Fox" or "Hunt the Hare" was played in English schools from at least the reign of Queen Elizabeth I. Shakespeare appears to evoke it in Hamlet: When the young prince eludes the guards at Elsinore, he cries "Hide, fox, and all after". Around 1800, the game was organised at Shrewsbury School into an outdoor game called "the Hunt" or "the Hounds", to prepare the young gentlemen for their future pastime of fox hunting. The two runners making the trail with paper were called "foxes", those chasing them were called "hounds".

Hare coursing rather than fox hunting was used as an analogy when the game spread to Bath School, so the trail-makers were called "hares". This term was made popular by the paper chase scene in Tom Brown's School Days (1857) and is still used in modern hashing and in club names such as Thames Hare and Hounds. Shrewsbury continued to use fox hunting terms, as evidenced in Samuel Butler's The Way of All Flesh (1903). In this case the hare was a couple of boys who were called foxes".

The Royal Shrewsbury School Hunt is the oldest cross-country club in the world, with written records going back to 1831 and evidence that it was established by 1819. The club officers are the Huntsman, and Senior and Junior Whips. The runners are Hounds, who start most races paired into "couples"; the winner of a race is said to "kill". The main inter-house cross-country races are still called the Junior and Senior Paperchase, although no paper is dropped, and urban development means the historical course can no longer be followed.

In 1938, British immigrants founded the Hash House Harriers in Kuala Lumpur based on this game.

== Literary and cinema references ==
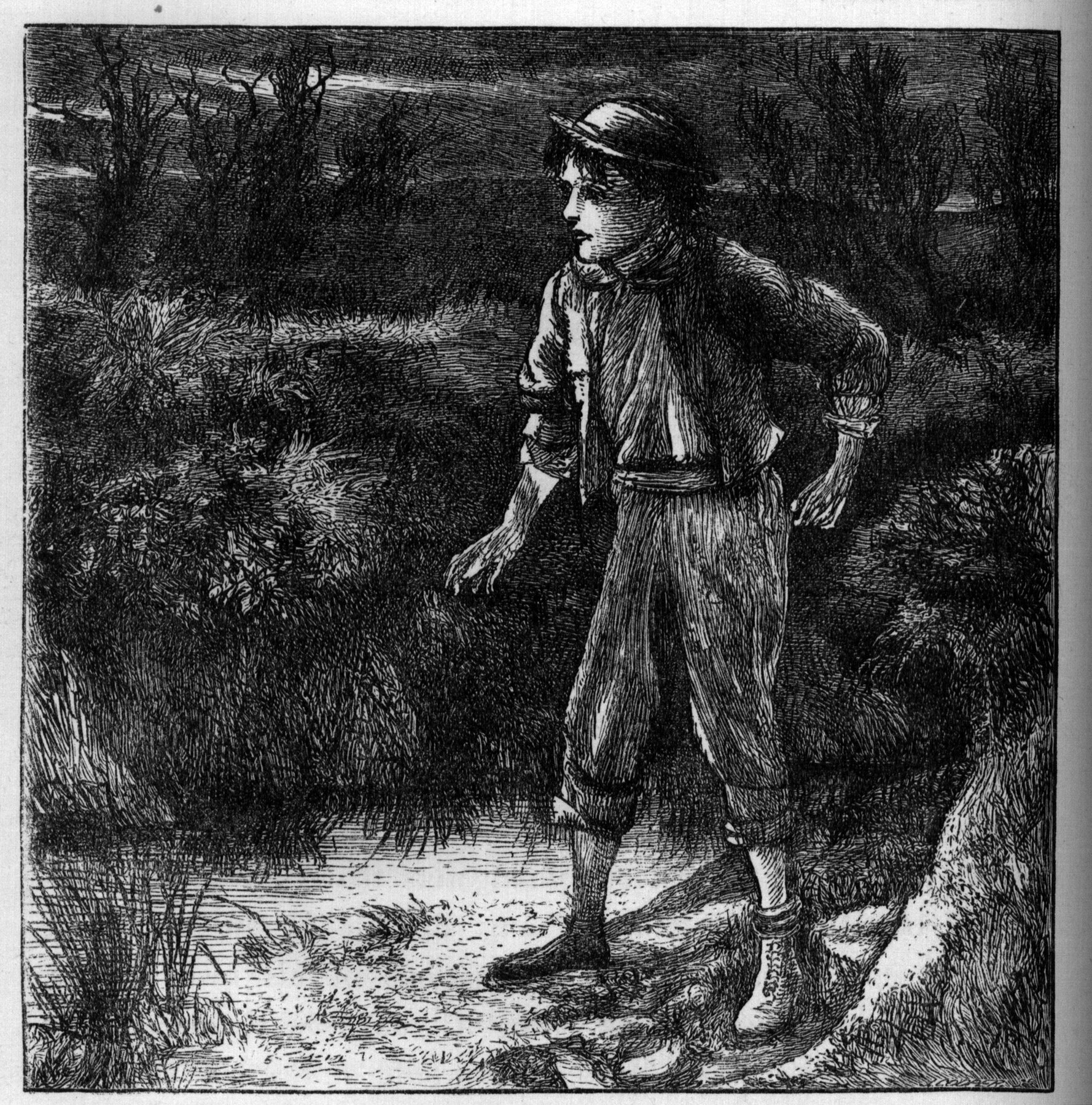
An illustration from Tom Brown's School Days of a player of Big-Side Hare and Hounds

Thomas Hughes' 1857 novel Tom Brown's School Days depicts a meet by the Big-Side Hare and Hounds. Students busily tear old newspapers, copybooks and magazines into small pieces to fill four large bags with the paper ‘scent’. Forty or fifty boys gather, and two good runners are chosen as hares. Carrying the bags, they start across the fields laying the trail. When a member of the pack finds the paper scent they call "Forward!" (hashers now call “ON! ON!”). In the story, members of the pack work together finding scent, and they strain to keep up with the hare.

In chapter 39 of his semi-autobiographical novel The Way of All Flesh, published posthumously in 1903, Samuel Butler describes a school based on his alma mater, Shrewsbury. The protagonist's favourite recreation is running with "the Hounds", so "a run of six or seven miles across country was no more than he was used to".

In the book The Railway Children, written by Edith Nesbit in 1906, the children observe a game of paper chase. The book was made into a television series four times and into a movie twice. The most recent adaptation was in 2000.

In the novel Daddy Long Legs, written in 1912 by Jean Webster, the girls play a game of paper chase where the hares cheat: They leave a paper trail indicating that they entered a locked barn through a high window, while in fact they went around the building.

In H.P. Lovecraft's novella At the Mountains of Madness, first published in 1936, the narrator refers to the game when using paper to blaze a trail through an unexplored city: "Fortunately we had a supply of extra paper to tear up, place in a spare specimen bag, and use on the ancient principle of hare and hounds for marking our course in any interior mazes we might be able to penetrate."

In the 1946 Orson Welles movie, The Stranger, Rankin's students are in the midst of a paper chase through the woods when Rankin kills his former colleague. Rankin misdirects the "hounds" to keep them from finding the body by moving the shreds of paper.

In the 1954 memoir by Vyvyan Holland, Son of Oscar Wilde, he describes playing paper chase at Neuenheim College in Heidelberg, Germany in 1896. "[W]hen the river was frozen and the snow lay thick upon the ground, so that it was impossible either to row or to play football, paper chases were organised by the master in charge of games. No form of exercise is quite so utterly pointless and boring as a paper chase, and we used to try to slink off and get lost and find our way home by ourselves; though this, if discovered, was apt to lead to a painful interview with the games master."

In the 1975 Disney movie One of Our Dinosaurs Is Missing, the nannies notice a trail of paper scraps on the ground while trying to hide a dinosaur skeleton in a wood. They remark that it must be a paper chase, at which point a group of schoolboys crash through the wood following the trail.

A 1986 episode of the animated television series The Wind in the Willows is called "Paperchase", and the focus is of that game.

In the 1995 episode of the British series As Time Goes By, "Welcome News", a paper chase is suggested as a humane alternative to a foxhunt.

== See also ==
Cross country running § History
