= The Railway Children Return =

2022 film sequel directed by Morgan Matthews

- Theatrical release poster
- Directed by: Morgan Matthews
- Written by: Danny Brocklehurst
- Based on: The Railway Children by E. Nesbit
- Produced by: Jemma Rodgers
- Starring: Jenny Agutter; Tom Courtenay; Sheridan Smith
- Cinematography: Kit Fraser
- Edited by: Rebecca Lloyd
- Music by: Edward Farmer; Martin Phipps
- Distributed by: StudioCanal
- Release date: 15 July 2022; (United Kingdom)
- Running time: 98 minutes
- Country: United Kingdom
- Language: English
- Box office: $4.2 million

The Railway Children Return, known as Railway Children in the US, is a 2022 family drama film directed by Morgan Matthews and written by Danny Brocklehurst. It is a sequel to the 1970 film The Railway Children, itself based on the E. Nesbit novel of the same name. The film stars Jenny Agutter, Sheridan Smith, Tom Courtenay and John Bradley. It was released in the United Kingdom on 15 July 2022 by StudioCanal.

== Plot ==
It is 1944, and a fresh wave of bombings fall on Britain during the Second World War. 14-year-old Lily Watts and her younger siblings Pattie and Ted are evacuated from Manchester to the village of Oakworth in the West Riding of Yorkshire, where they are greeted by Bobbie Waterbury, her schoolmistress daughter Annie and her son Thomas. All the children are selected to be given homes by the locals but due to a request from officials not to split siblings up, the Watts trio are left. When nobody else takes them, Bobbie welcomes them into their home. The siblings quickly bond with Thomas. The US Army has a base in the area, and there is a disturbance on their first evening. As they explore their new surroundings, the children are set upon by a group of local children not happy with their presence and Thomas welcomes them to his hideout in an old brake van by the railway station.

One day, Annie receives bad news about her husband who is away fighting in the war, reminding her of the deaths of Bobbie's husband and brother in the First World War. The children give her some space and play hide and seek at the station. Whilst there, they find an African-American soldier named Abe McCarthy in their hideout with an injured leg. He claims to be on a secret mission and that he has to remain hidden. That evening a lone enemy aircraft drops a bomb on the town cemetery, causing Lily to fall as she brings a first aid kit and other supplies to Abe. He rescues her and reveals he joined the Army to avenge his brother who was killed in combat, but details about his story leaves her suspicious. The next day, white American Military Police arrive at the school looking for Abe and Lily learns that he is a deserter. When she confronts him about it, Abe reveals that he is actually the same age as Lily and that he is trying to return home after seeing how the US Army treats his fellow black soldiers who are often beaten by the Military Police, despite the town's inhabitants refusing the US authorities' request to impose a colour bar in the local pub. (Note: The writers drew on real-life incidents at Bamber Bridge and Launceston.) She agrees to help him escape.

When Lily tells the others and plans to hide Abe at the house, Thomas initially insists they tell the truth to the grown-ups. Lily stops this idea immediately, challenging Thomas for his ignorance of the realities of the world, and revealing that their father was also killed in combat. Thomas agrees to let Abe stay in the large storeroom next door to his bedroom. That evening, the family are visited by Walter, the widowed husband to Bobbie's sister Phyllis. The next day, Lily escorts Abe down to the station to catch a train to Liverpool and Thomas joins them to create a distraction so they can get on the train unnoticed. In doing so he is caught by the local police, who inform the US Military Police, who in turn stop and search the train further up the line. Abe and Lily are handcuffed, taken to the base and then put aboard a US Army supply train, also carrying senior officers.

When confronted on the matter by Thomas, Annie reveals that his father's plane was shot down but that he is still alive in a prisoner-of-war camp. After he reveals everything to Walter, his uncle informs him about the American supply train, which he has found out about by telephoning his employer, the War Office. Thomas rallies Pattie, Ted and the rest of the local and evacuee children to create banners warning the train to stop, just as Bobbie and her siblings had done forty years earlier. The children successfully stop the train and denounce the actions of the Americans. Abe explains the truth to the most senior general, also an African-American, who reveals that he too had enlisted underage and orders Abe to be released. After staying with the family for a few days, Abe leaves for home, promising to write to Lily before he goes. The siblings return to their mother three months later, whilst Thomas's father returns home after VE Day.

== Cast ==
- Beau Gadsdon as Lily Watts
- Austin Haynes as Thomas
- Eden Hamilton as Pattie Watts
- Zac Cudby as Ted Watts
- KJ Aikens as Abraham "Abe" McCarthy
- Jenny Agutter as Roberta "Bobbie" Waterbury. (Note: Agutter is the only returning cast member of the original film, playing a grown-up version of the same character.)
- Tom Courtenay as Uncle Walter
- Sheridan Smith as Annie
- Jessica Baglow as Angela
- John Bradley as Richard Perks (Note: He has been established in interviews as the grandson of Albert Perks from the original film, though this is not explicitly mentioned in the film itself. It was planned to have Albert return played by the original actor Bernard Cribbins, but this proved impossible.)
- Hugh Quarshie as General Harrison
- Neil Hurst as Teacher
- Micky Williams as Children's Dad
- Joseph Richards as Georgie Duckworth

== Production ==
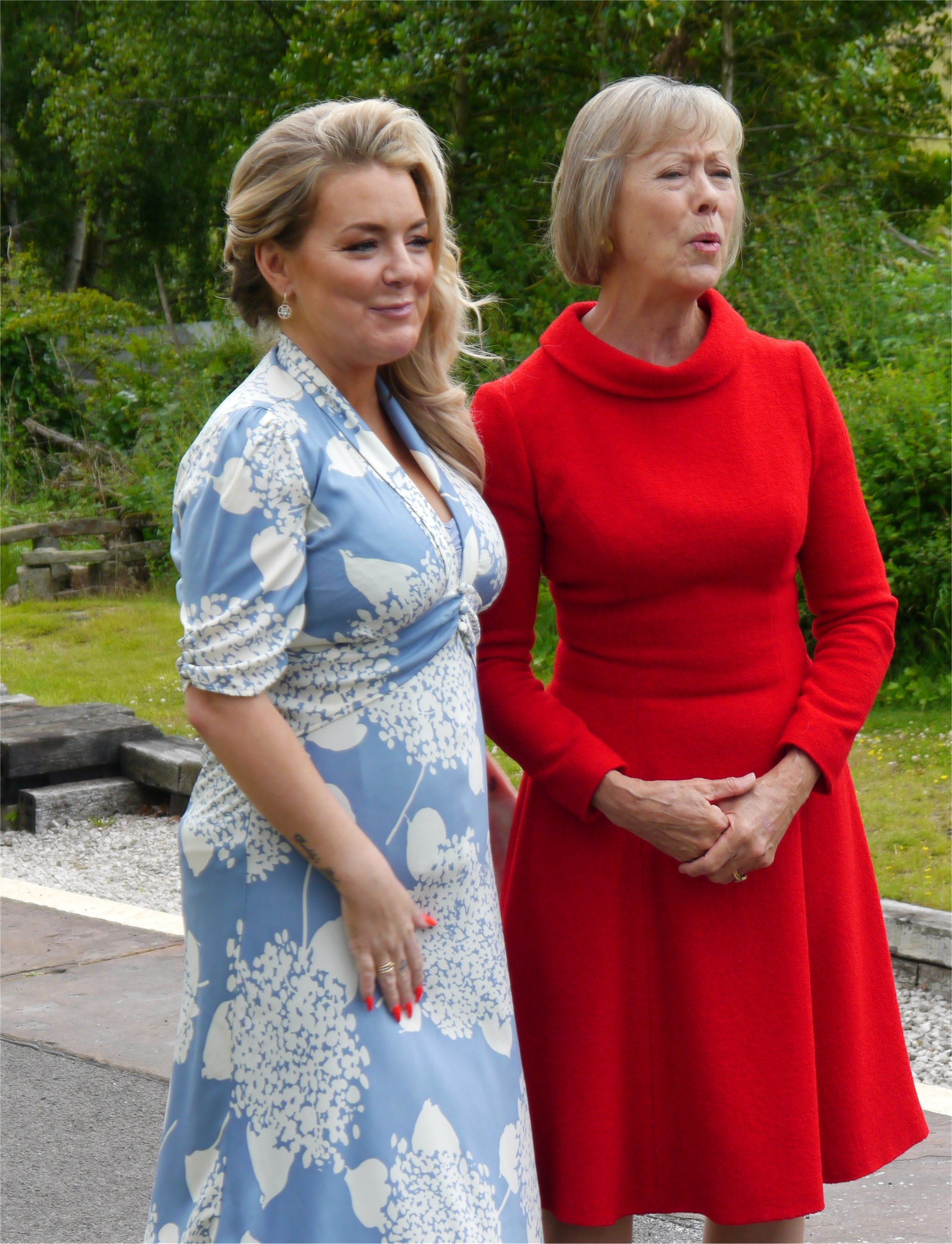
Sheridan Smith & Jenny Agutter at the press launch for the film at Oakworth Station, prior to the world premiere of the film at Keighley

The Railway Children Return was announced on 6 May 2021. Like its predecessor film, scenes were shot in and around the countryside of the Keighley and Worth Valley Railway in West Yorkshire, with filming beginning on 10 May 2021 and taking between six and eight weeks.

=== Steam Locomotives ===
Three steam locomotives are predominantly used throughout the film; 5820 USA Transportation Corp, Class S160 (affectionately known as Big Jim), 43924 LMS Class 4F and 45596 "Bahamas" LMS Jubilee Class. 78022 BR Standard Class 2 2-6-0 also makes a very brief appearance in the film. At the time of filming, "Bahamas" was in British Railways green livery and the overlaid, correct LMS decals (BR was only formed in 1948) can be easily observed on the tender. Its BR number was also changed from 45596 to the correct 5596 which was used when the engine worked for the LMS. 43924 which was also in British Railways identity and wore plain black livery had its BR crest overlaid with LMS decals and its 43924 number changed to 3924. To celebrate the film's release, Hornby Railways has produced a OO scale model of 43924 LMS Class 4F in special packaging.

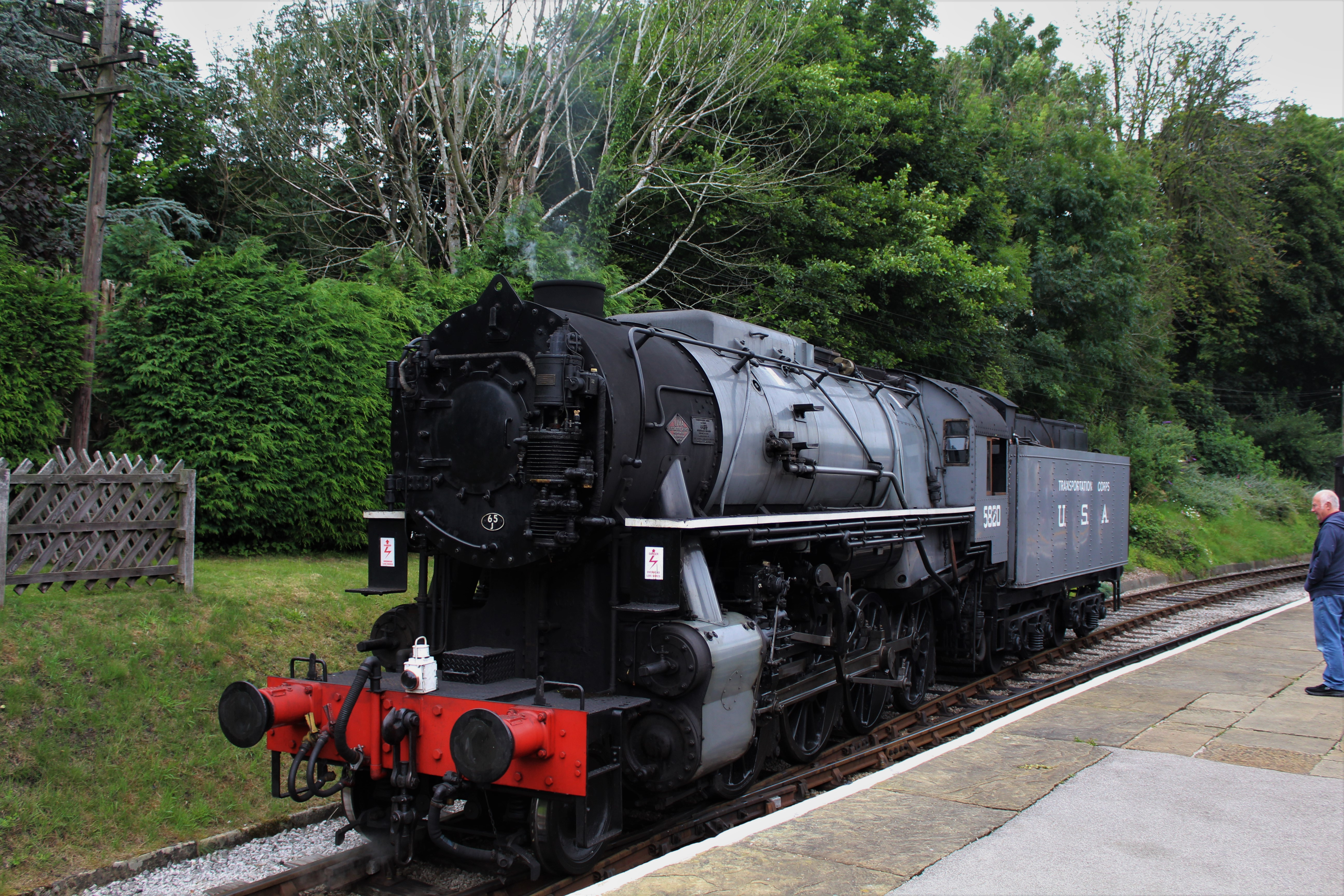
5820 Big Jim

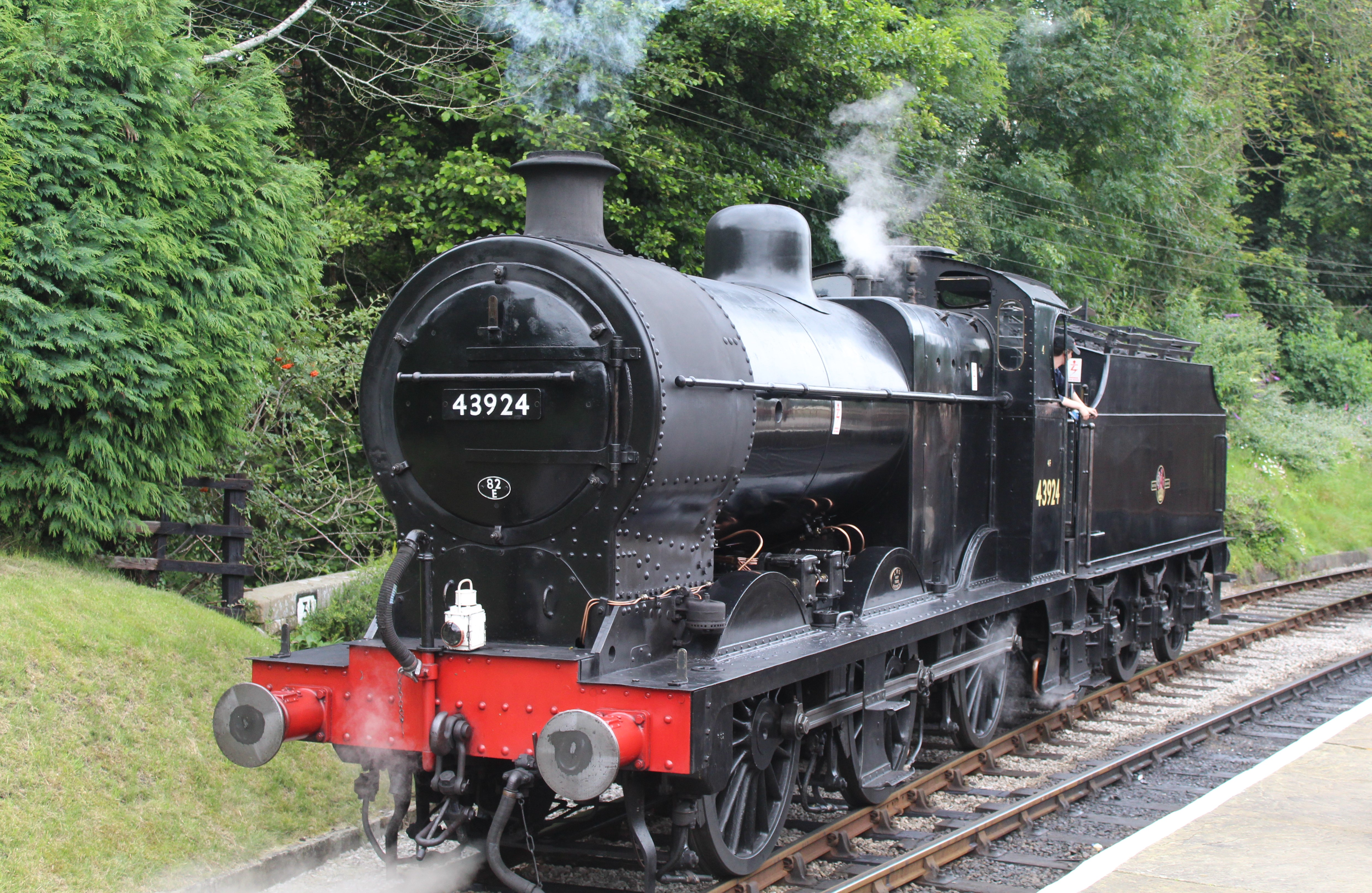
43924

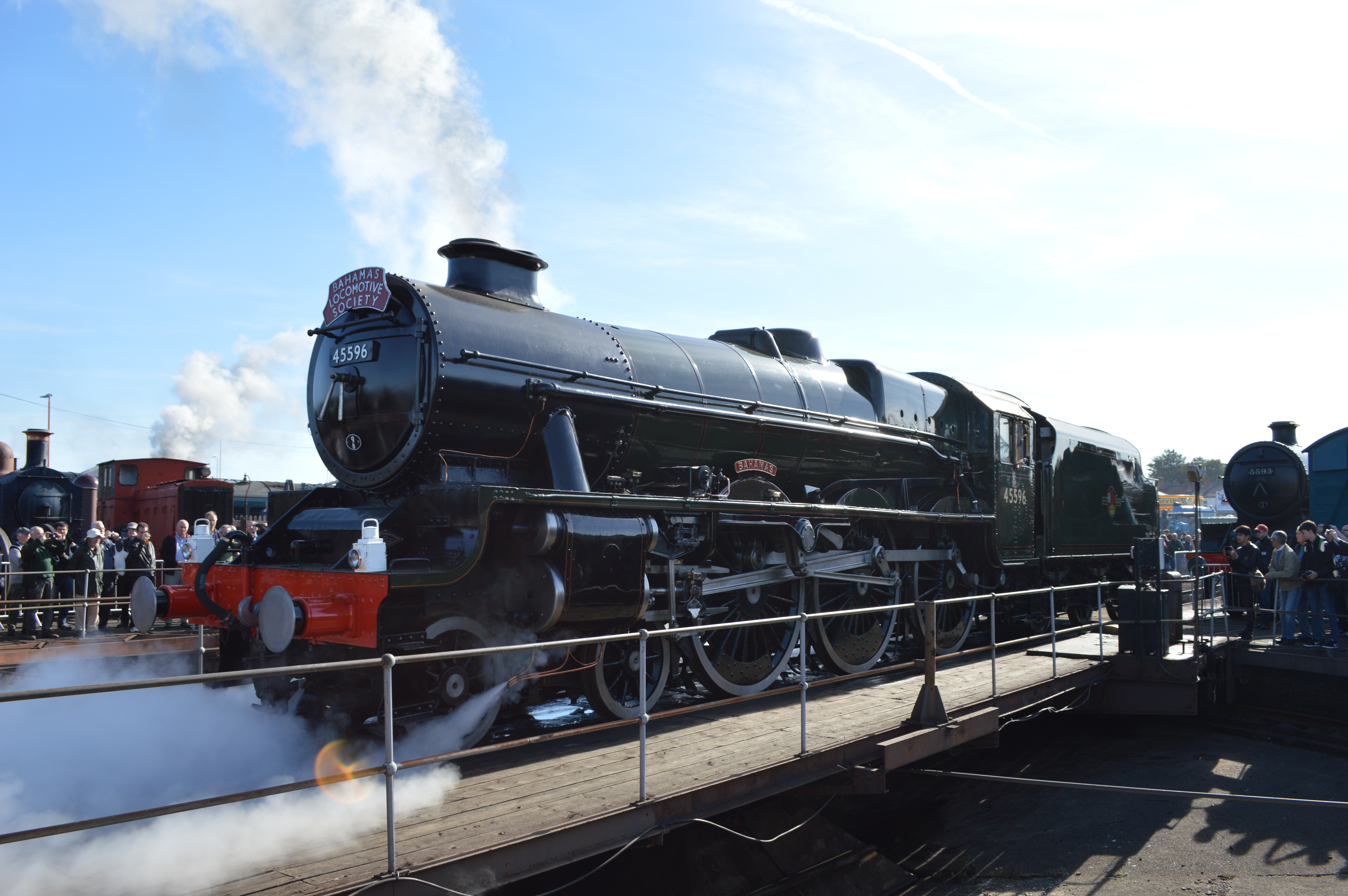
45596 Bahamas

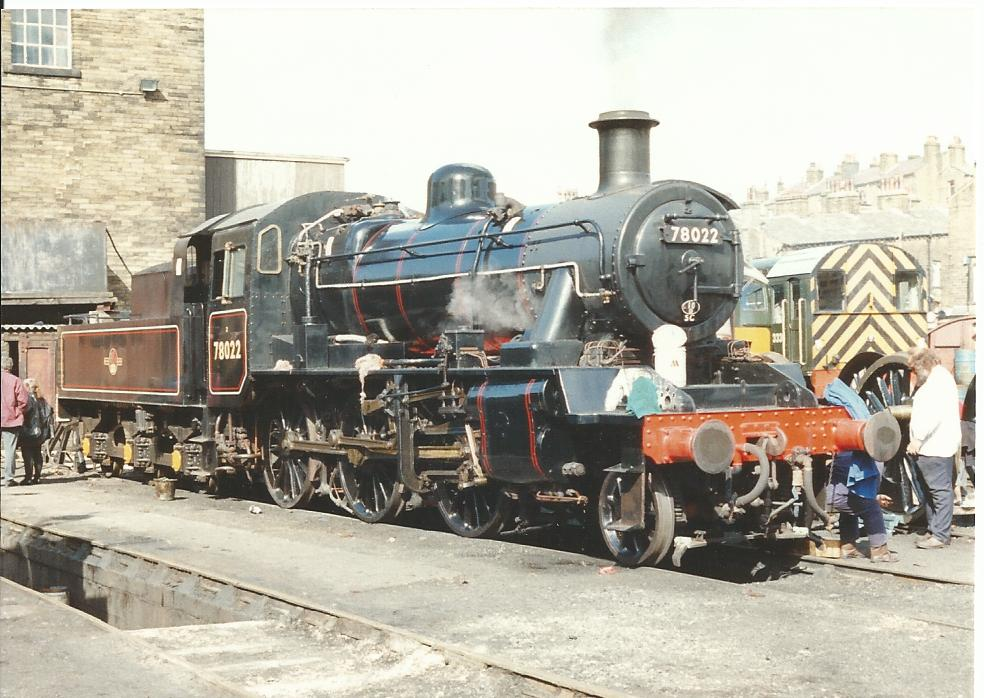
78022

== Reception ==
=== Box office ===
The Railway Children Return grossed $4,287,140.

=== Critical response ===
On the review aggregation website Rotten Tomatoes, the film has an approval rating of 59% based on 44 reviews, with an average rating of 5.80/10. The website's critics' consensus reads, "Fueled by nostalgia, Railway Children reaches its destination in middling yet amiable fashion." On Metacritic, the film has a weighted average score of 54 out of 100 based on reviews from 10 critics, indicating "mixed or average reviews".
