= Jack Blumenau =

British actor (born 1986)

Jack Blumenau (born 22 November 1986) is a British actor.

== Personal life ==
Blumenau was born to casting director Debbie O'Brien, and director/actor Colin Blumenau. He began acting at age 12. He spent his early youth in Ashwell, Hertfordshire, attending Ashwell JMI until 1998, and The Highfield School in Letchworth from 1998 to 2008.

Blumenau has two brothers, Dan and Harry.

=== Education ===
In 2009, Bluemanu gained his B.Sc. from the London School of Economics and Political Science. In 2012 he gained his M.Phil. in European politics and society from Oxford University. In 2016 he gained his Ph.D. in political science from London School of Economics and Political Science.

Today, Blumenau is an associate professor in the Department of Political Science at University College London.

== Selected credits ==
=== Theatre ===
- Peter Pan (2003–04, Savoy) – Peter Pan
- The Prisoner's Dilemma (RSC Barbican) – Jan
- The Pirates of Penzance (2003–04, Savoy) – young pirate, and Frederick
- Sherlock Holmes – The Athenaeum Ghoul (2005, UK tour) – Billy
- The Taming of the Shrew (2006, Bristol Old Vic) – Biondello
- Little Eyolf (2007, English Touring Theatre, rehearsed reading)
- Black-Eyed Susan (2007, Theatre Royal Bury St Edmunds/ Theatre Royal Wakefield) – Jacob
- Animal Magnetism (2008, Theatre Royal Bury St Edmunds)
- Red Fortress (2008, Unicorn Theatre) – Luis
- The York Realist (2009, Riverside Studios) – Jack
- The Lion, The Witch, and The Wardrobe (2009, New Vic Theatre, Newcastle-under-Lyme) – Edmund
- Bleak House (2010, New Vic Theatre, Newcastle-under-Lyme)

=== Television ===
- Best Friends (2004, Citv) – Callum
- Noah and Saskia (2004, BBC TV/ABC Australia Series) – Noah
- Half Life (BBC TV) – Dylan
- There's a Viking in My Bed (BBC TV Series) – Tim
- Reach for the Moon (LWT Series) – Kyle
- Microsoap (BBC TV) – Danny
- Hello! (NC Grivas Productions) – Peter
- Start Now (NC Grivas Productions) – Ron
- The Railway Children (2000, Carlton Film Productions) – Peter
- Genie in the House (2006 episode Election – Ricky; 2007 episode Emma TV – Harold, Nickelodeon)
- As the Bell Rings (2007 episodes O Romeo and A Touch of Class, Disney Channel UK) – Tinker
- Doctors (2008 episode, Yesterday's News) – Glen Preece

=== Film ===
- The Glow (2001 short movie, Glory Films) – David
- Dr Jekyll and Mr Hyde (2002 television movie, Clerkenwell Films) – Ned Chandler
- Origin (short, 2011) – Freddy Holmes

=== Audio/Narration ===
- The Hoobs (Jim Henson Productions) – narrator
- The Ghost of Thomas Kempe (First Writes/Radio 4) – James
- Spot's Bedtime Stories (Penguin/3T Prod) – Spot
- Charlie and the Chocolate Factory (Penguin Audio Books) – Charlie
- Charlie and the Great Glass Elevator (Penguin Audio Books) – Charlie
- Teddy Robinson (Penguin Audio Books) – Philip
- Mansfield Park (Radio 4)
