= Gary Warren (actor) =

English actor (born 1954)

Gary Warren (born 5 July 1954) is an English former child actor, best known for his role as Peter in the 1970 film The Railway Children.

Gary Warren was born in Neasden, London. He played Cedric Collingford ("Owl Face") in series 2 of the 1970 television series Catweazle, appearing as the main 20th century contact of Catweazle. He later played the role of Taplow in the British sitcom Whack-O!, and starred as Alexander in his own TV sitcom Alexander the Greatest (1971). In the West End, he played the nephew of Mame in the musical Mame starring Ginger Rogers. He played Lambert Simnel in the 1972 BBC series The Shadow of the Tower.

Warren was interviewed by Danny Baker on Radio London twice in 2010. Warren appeared on the Word In Your Attic YouTube show hosted by David Hepworth and Mark Ellen in 2020.

He has written a memoir of his acting years and his passion for music entitled If My Memoir Serves Me Well, and a novel, 1961 Greenwich Village; a Fable. Both are available on Kindle and in audiobook format on Audible.

Warren lives in Woodstock, New York from where he presents a weekly theme music show on Fridays on Kpiss Radio. He is a supporter of Queens Park Rangers.

== Filmography ==
- 1966 Disney Wonderland (TV series)
- 1967 Z-Cars (TV series)
- 1967 The Ragged Trousered Philanthropists (TV movie)
- 1970 The Railway Children
- 1970–1971 Catweazle (TV series)
- 1972 The Shadow of the Tower (TV series)
- 1972 Whack-O! (TV series)
- 1971–1972 Alexander the Greatest (title role)

== Works ==
- Gary, Warren (2 June 2024). If My Memoir Serves Me Well: A Memoir From The Man Who Played The Boy In The Railway Children. ASIN B0D52BM3F4.
- Gary, Warren (23 May 2024). 1961 Greenwich Village; a Fable. ASIN B0D5WS19KW.
