= Oakworth railway station =

Heritage railway station in West Yorkshire, England

Oakworth
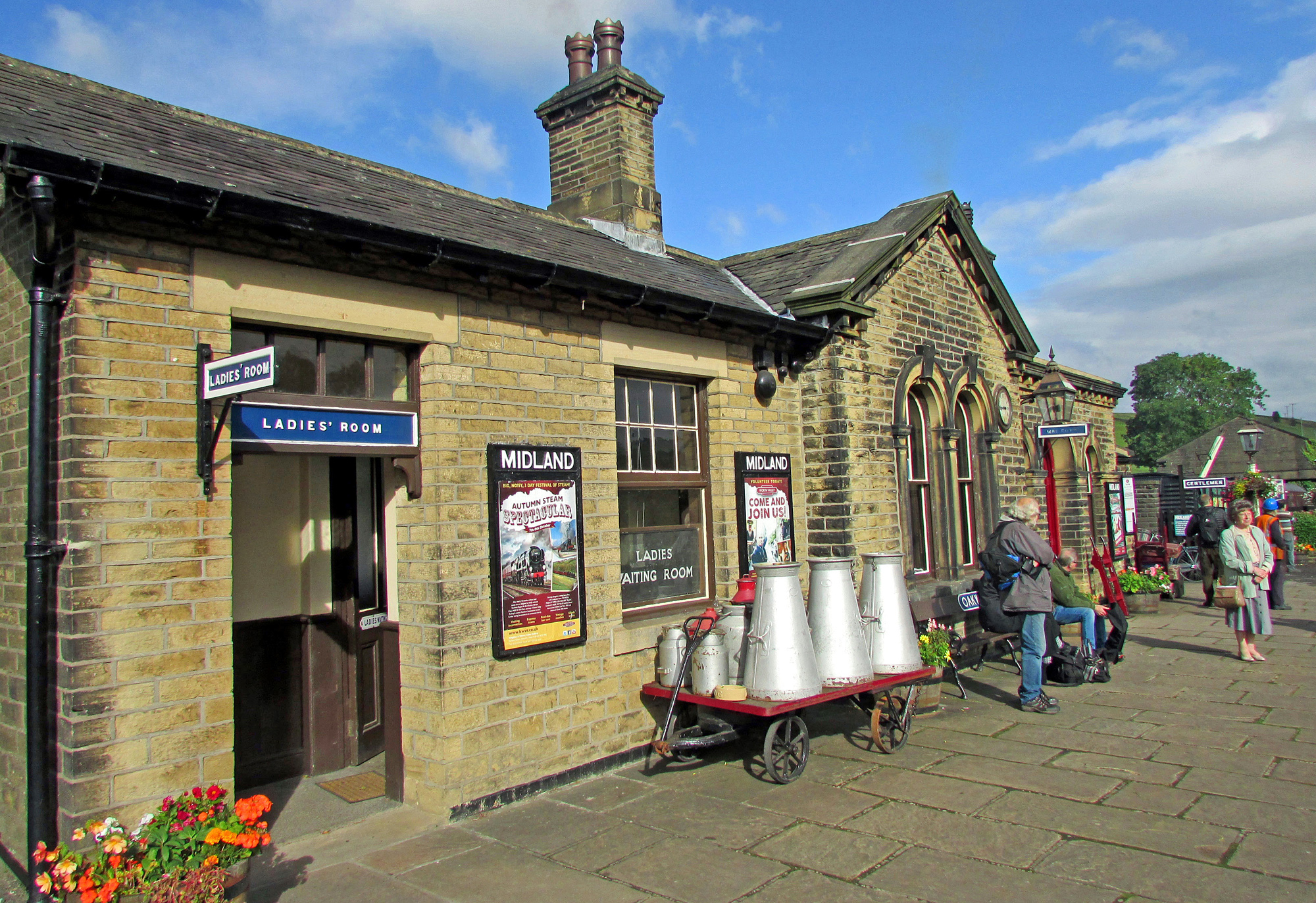
- Oakworth station

General information
- Location: Oakworth, City of Bradford; England
- Coordinates: 53.8414°N 1.9416°W
- Grid reference: SE039383
- System: Station on heritage railway
- Manager: Keighley and Worth Valley Railway
- Platforms: 1

Key dates
- 15 April 1867: Opened
- 1 January 1962: Closed
- 28 June 1968: Reopened as a heritage station
Location

Oakworth railway station serves the village of Oakworth, near Keighley, in the City of Bradford metropolitan district of West Yorkshire, England. It operated as a station on the national network between 1867 and 1962; it was reopened in 1968, as a heritage station on the Keighley and Worth Valley Railway.

== History ==
The station was built by the Keighley and Worth Valley Railway (KWVR) and opened for passengers, with the rest of the line, on 15 April 1867 and for goods traffic on 1 July that year. The Midland Railway leased the line and absorbed the KWVR with effect from 1 July 1881. The London Midland and Scottish Railway absorbed the Midland Railway in January 1923 and took over operation of the line.

British Railways assumed ownership of Great Britain's railway network on 1 January 1948. The line was closed to passengers on 1 January 1962 and to goods traffic on 18 June 1962.

== Operations ==
Originally there was a signal box at the station, which controlled a goods loop giving access to the goods yard and the level crossing. This was removed in the 1950s and control of the level crossing passed to the station staff. It is still noticeable that the level crossing is still double track width, even though there is only a single line through the crossing.

== Preservation ==
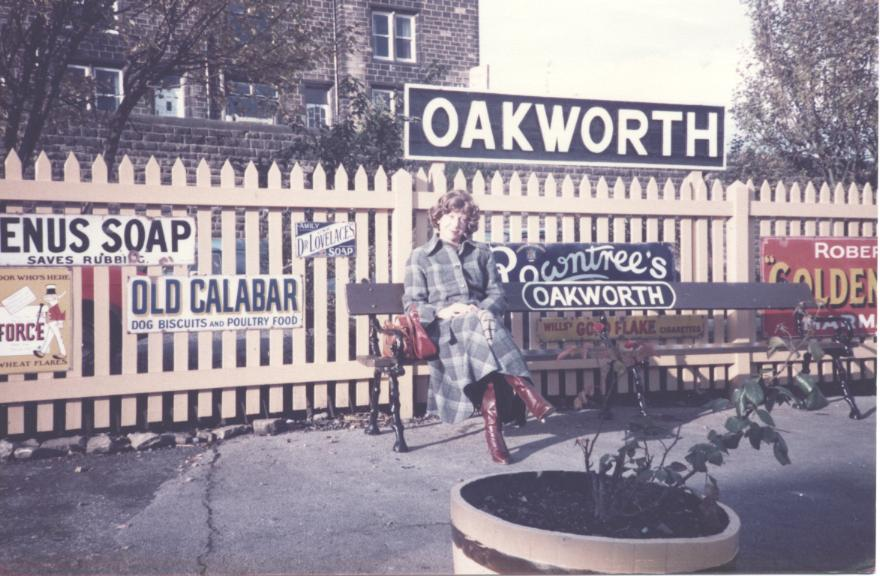
The station sign and vintage advertising boards

The Keighley and Worth Valley Railway Preservation Society took over the line; it reopened the station, along with the railway, on 28 June 1968.

Milk churns displayed on a hand cart and old railway posters bring back images of a former age. The platform fencing is used to display old enamel advertisement signs for period products, such as Virol.

The crossing keeper on duty at Oakworth has responsibility for the level crossing at the end of the platform, which is controlled by interlocked signals.

== Services ==
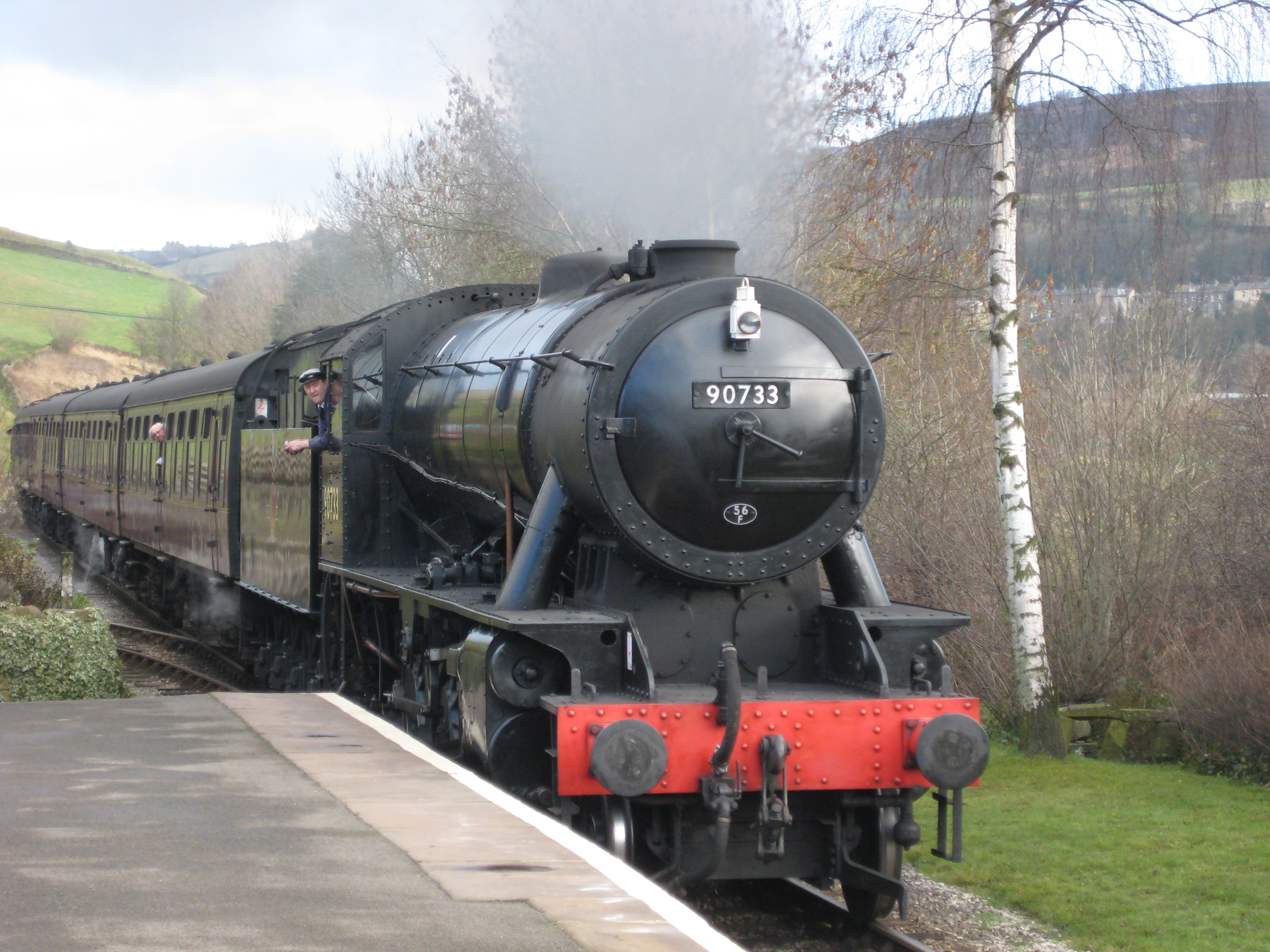
A steam-hauled service calling at the station

Services operate throughout the year, with running days allocated to a particular coloured timetable; these include purple in summer, with green and blue in winter.

Preceding station	Heritage railways	Following station
Haworth towards Oxenhope	Keighley & Worth Valley Railway	Damems towards Keighley

== In popular culture ==
The station is famous for being the main location used in the film The Railway Children. The station can still be seen much as was in the period 1905-1910; it is still lit by gas lights, both inside the buildings and on the platform.

The station was a location used in the filming of Joe Jackson's video for the song "Breaking Us in Two", from his Night and Day album in 1982.

Some scenes for the first and second episodes of the 2020s version of the TV series All Creatures Great and Small were filmed at the station.

== See also ==
- Listed buildings in Keighley
