= Damems =

Village in West Yorkshire, England

Coordinates: 53°50′48″N 1°55′41″W

Damems is a village near Keighley, within the City of Bradford Metropolitan District, West Yorkshire, England. Until the mid-19th century it was also known as Dam Elms or Dam Ems.

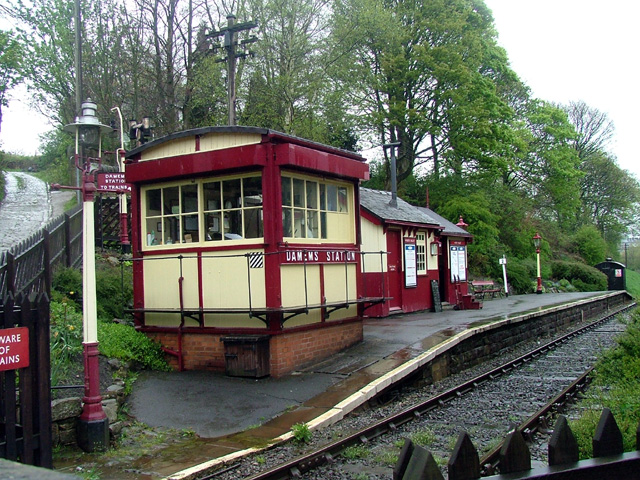
Damems railway station

The village is served by Damems railway station, opened in 1867, which claims to be Britain's smallest, although it is no longer part of the main rail network. It is used as a request stop for heritage trains. Damems is located on the Worth Way, a circular hiking path connecting Keighley with Oxenhope and the communities along the River Worth.

Originally a farming community, by the mid-19th century the textile industry had become the major employer of the Damems population. In 1851 a school room was provided by a local resident.

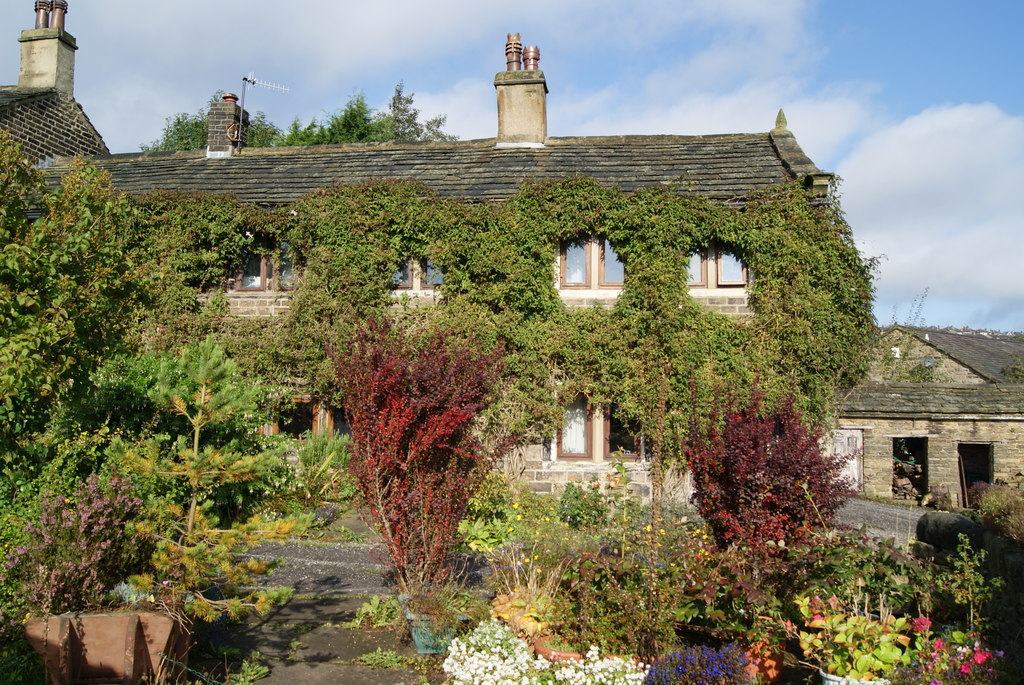
Rushey Hall

The Roper family of Rushy Hall (also known as Rushy Fall and Rushey Hall), Keighley, had a cotton mill built near Damems around 1780. This was originally water-powered and straddled the River Worth. After 1824 turned into a worsted mill, and a larger water wheel was installed in 1843. In 1852 it was the scene of a weavers' strike connected with the introduction of power looms. A steam engine was added before 1859. The course of the roads and the river had to be altered in connection with the construction of the railway lines in the vicinity. The warehouse burned down in 1874 and the mill in 1878, but were rebuilt. It changed hands several times and was sold in 1934 to Salts (Saltaire) Ltd. who had the mill chimney removed in the same year. The mill was during its last years powered by electricity. In 1977 the premises were sold to Oxenhope Engineering and Ogden's of Oakworth.
