= Damems railway station =

Railway station in West Yorkshire, England

Damems
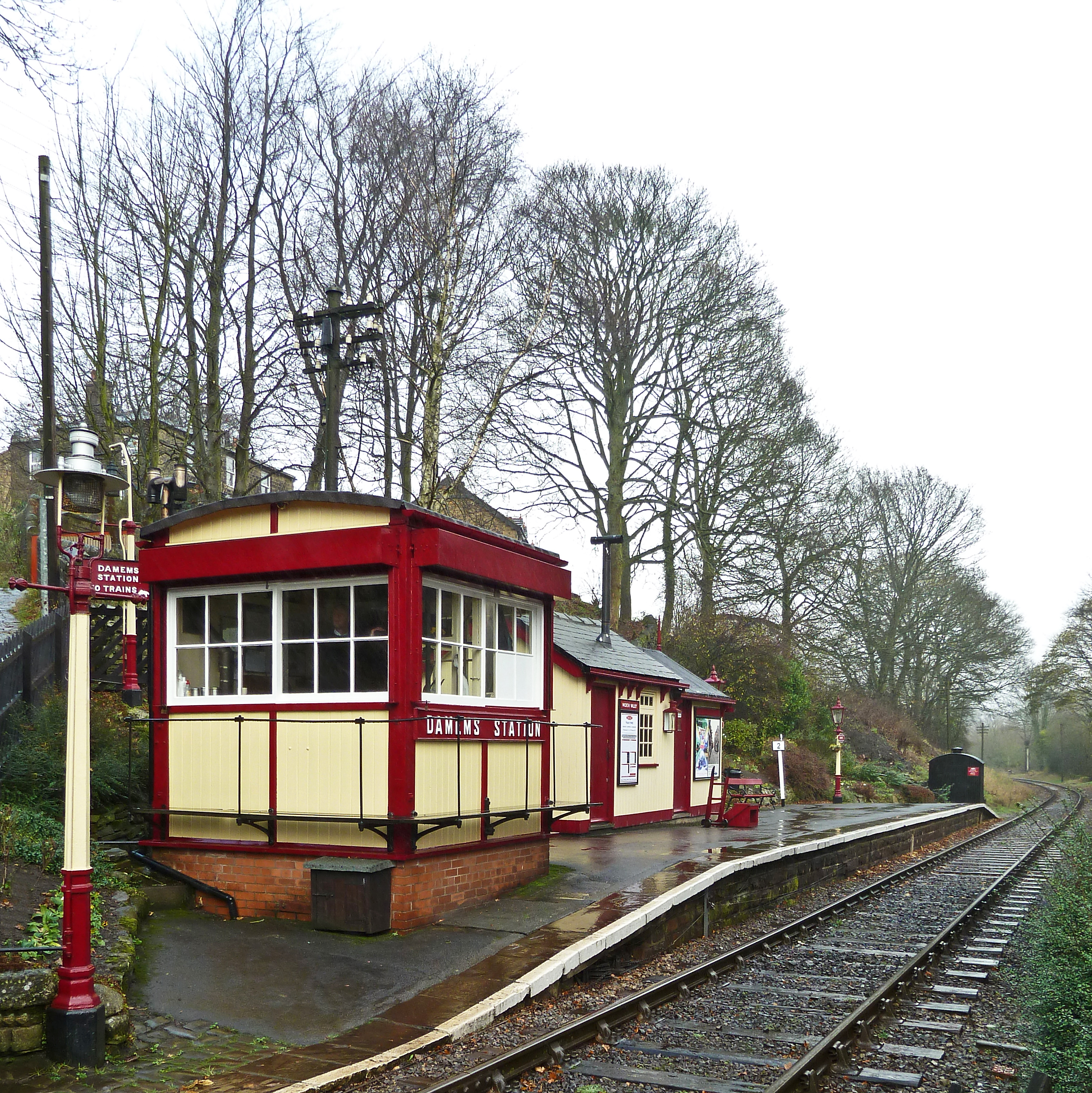
- Damems railway station in 2011

General information
- Location: Damems, City of Bradford; England
- Coordinates: 53.8459°N 1.9245°W
- Grid reference: SE050388
- System: Station on heritage railway
- Manager: Keighley and Worth Valley Railway
- Platforms: 1

Key dates
- 1 September 1867: Station opened
- 23 May 1949: Station closed
- 29 June 1968: Station re-opened
Location

Damems railway station serves the village of Damems near Keighley, and within the City of Bradford Metropolitan District, West Yorkshire, England. It is used for heritage trains on the Keighley and Worth Valley Railway and trains do not stop unless requested.

== History ==
The station opened on 1 September 1867, several months after the others on the line; but it closed on 23 May 1949, some years before the line closed. It reopened with the line on 29 June 1968.

It claims to be Britain's smallest standard-gauge railway station, although it is no longer part of the main rail network. Damems has the distinction of being a station rather than a halt because in its original form it included a stationmaster's house and a siding to serve the mill in the village. The stationmaster's house remains, and is owned by the heritage railway, although the siding has been removed. The level crossing at the station is controlled from a gate box originally from Earby on the Colne-Skipton line. The box was installed since preservation. The crossing was originally worked from a groundframe in the stationmaster's garden. The last crossing keeper at Damems was Annie Feather who lived in the stationmaster's house and received her wages which were thrown to her from the footplate of a passing locomotive.

== Stationmasters ==
- T. Dawill until 1874
- William Cliff 1874
- J. Clark 1874 - 1880
- J. Preece 1880 - 1889
- T. Hudson 1889 - ca 1908
- John Edward Sykes 1913 - 1934
- E. Bird from 1938 (also station master at Oakworth)

Preceding station	Heritage railways	Following station
Oakworth towards Oxenhope	Keighley & Worth Valley Railway	Ingrow (West) towards Keighley
