= Listed buildings in Oxenhope =

Oxenhope is a civil parish in the metropolitan borough of the City of Bradford, West Yorkshire, England. It contains 44 listed buildings that are recorded in the National Heritage List for England. All the listed buildings are designated at Grade II, the lowest of the three grades, which is applied to "buildings of national importance and special interest". The parish contains the village of Oxenhope and the surrounding countryside. Most of the listed buildings are houses and cottages, farmhouses and farm buildings. The other listed buildings include a milestone, a milepost, a textile mill, a mill chimney, a public house with a mounting block nearby, churches and a chapel, and a former packhorse bridge.

== Buildings ==
Name and location	Photograph	Date	Notes
Barn south of Moor House; 53.81644°N 1.95607°W	—	16th century (probable)	The barn is in stone with a stone slate roof. It contains a segmental-headed cart entry, and to the left is a doorway with a stone lintel.
North Ives Farmhouse; 53.81986°N 1.94855°W	—	1600	The farmhouse, which was extended in the 19th century, is ia stone with a stone slate roof. There are two storeys and a rear extension. On the front is a gabled porch with a dated doorway, and the windows are mullioned.
11 Yate Lane; 53.80977°N 1.94932°W	—	17th century	A stone house that has a stone slate roof with a coped gable and shaped kneelers on the right, and two storeys. The doorway has a plain surround, and the windows are mullioned, with nine lights in the ground floor and eight lights in the upper floor. Above the ground floor window is a hood mould.
13 and 15 Yate Lane; 53.80981°N 1.94948°W		17th century	The house was rebuilt in the 18th century, and divided into two dwellings in the 19th century. It is in stone with chamfered quoins, a moulded string course, a moulded eaves cornice, and a stone slate roof with coped gables and kneelers. There are two storeys and a symmetrical front of five bays. In the centre is a doorway with Ionic pilasters, a pulvinated frieze, and a segmental pediment. The windows are sashes in moulded architraves.
Outbuilding, Far Isle Farm; 53.80181°N 1.94249°W	—	17th century	A farmhouse, later an outbuilding, it is in millstone grit, with quoins, and a stone slate roof with coped gables and shaped kneelers. There are two storeys and one bay. The doorway has a chamfered surround, and the windows are mullioned, with some mullions removed.
North Birks Farmhouse and barn 53.81716°N 1.93884°W	—	17th century	The farmhouse and attached barn were altered in the 19th century. The older part is in sandstone with millstone grit dressings, the later part is in millstone grit, and the roofs are in stone slate. The house has quoins, two storeys, and a single-story outshut. On the front is a two-storey gabled porch containing a doorway with a chamfered quoined surround, voussoirs, and an impost band. Above it is a square opening and an inscribed plaque. Most of the windows are mullioned, with some mullions removed, some windows have hood moulds, and at the rear is an oculus. The barn to the right has a central round-arched cart entry with a quoined surround, chamfered voussoirs, and a lintel course. At the rear is a round-arched cart entry above which is an inscribed stone.
Barn and cottage, North Ives Farm; 53.81988°N 1.94824°W	—	1682	The cottage is in part of the rear of the barn, and the buildings are in stone with a stone slate roof. The cottage has two storeys, and contains mullioned windows, with four lights in the ground floor and five in the upper floor, and in the barn is a low segmental-arched cart entry.
Barn south of 1 and 2 Mould Greave; 53.81609°N 1.96303°W	—	17th to early 18th century	The barn is in millstone grit with quoins, and a stone slate roof with a coped gable and shaped kneeler on the left. It has an arched cart entry with chamfered doorways in the returns, a door with a stone lintel, three single-light windows, and three slit vents, two of them round-arched. At the rear is a blocked chamfered doorway and a single-light window.
Lower Fold Farmhouse; 53.80745°N 1.97879°W	—	17th to early 18th century	A laithe house in stone with quoins, and a stone slate roof with coped gables and shaped kneelers. There are two storeys, and both parts have mullioned windows. The house has a plinth, three bays, and it contains a doorway with a plain surround and blocks. The barn has four bays, an aisle, and contains a quoined cart entry and doorways.
Nessfields; 53.81087°N 1.95275°W	—	Late 17th to early 18th century	A house and two cottages, later altered and extended, and combined into one dwelling. The house is in millstone grit on a plinth, with quoins, a stone slate roof, and two storeys. On the front is a gabled porch, a segmental-headed doorway, and a stable door with a quoined surround. Most of the windows are mullioned, with some mullions removed.
Old Croft; 53.80843°N 1.95782°W	—	17th to early 18th century	A farmhouse and barn in one range, later altered and combined, it is in millstone grit with quoins, a stone slate roof, and two storeys. The house has three bays, a gabled porch with a segmental-arched doorway with a chamfered surround and a door with a chamfered quoined surround, and the windows are mullioned. The barn to the right has two bays, and contains a segmental-arched cart entry with a chamfered quoined surround.
Whinney Hill Foot Farmhouse, cottage and barn 53.80611°N 1.93218°W	—	Late 17th to early 18th century	The cottage was added to the house and barn in the late 18th century. The buildings are in millstone grit, and have stone slate roofs with coped gables and shaped kneelers, and two storeys. The house has a gabled porch and a doorway with a chamfered quoined surround and a chamfered lintel. The windows in the house and cottage are mullioned, and those in the ground floor of the house have hood moulds. The barn to the right has three bays and quoins, and contains a central round-arched doorway with a chamfered surround and voussoirs, and in the right return are chamfered slit vents.
Laithe house, Lower Fold Farm; 53.80763°N 1.97896°W	—	1721	The laithe house is in stone with quoins, and a stone slate roof with coped gables and shaped kneelers. There are two storeys, a rear aisle, and a lean-to. The house contains a blocked doorway with a chamfered quoined surround and an initialled and dated lintel, two later doorways, and mullioned windows, with some lights blocked. The barn to the right has three bays, a blocked doorway with a chamfered quoined surround, a later doorway, and a window.
Cowshed and pigsty, Lower Fold Farm; 53.80770°N 1.97867°W	—	Early 18th century	The cowshed and pigsty are in dry stone with quoins and a stone slate roof. There are two storeys, one bay, lean-tos on both sides, and an outshut at the rear. The building contains doorways, including one in the upper storey approached by external steps, a square window and square vents.
Mould Greave; 53.81594°N 1.96354°W	—	1742	A stone house that has a stone slate roof, coved tabling to the gables, and kneelers. There are two storeys and a rear wing. The doorway has a moulded surround with a datestone above, and the windows are mullioned. Above the ground floor openings is a continuous hood mould. In the rear wing is a dated bell in the gable, and in the left return is a dated Venetian window.
1 and 2 Cottages, Mould Greave; 53.81617°N 1.96320°W	—	Mid 18th century	Outbuildings, later extended and converted into cottages, they are in millstone grit with quoins, and a stone slate roof with a coped gable and shaped kneeler on the right. There are two storeys and five bays. On the front is a blocked doorway with a chamfered surround and a keystone, and doorways with tie-stone jambs, and in the rear are later inserted doorways. In the right return is a blocked doorway with tie-stone jambs converted into a window, with a datestone above. Most of the windows are mullioned, with some mullions removed.
Barn north of 11 Yate Lane; 53.80990°N 1.94927°W		18th century	The barn, which has been converted for residential use, is in stone with quoins, and a stone slate roof with coped gables and shaped kneelers. There are two storeys and an attic, and three bays. In the centre is a round-arched cart entry. This is flanked by Venetian windows, and in the upper floor are three round-arched windows; all the windows have keystones and imposts. At the rear is a round-arched cart entry with voussoirs.
Milestone; 53.80651°N 1.95861°W		18th century	The milestone is on the southwest side of Hebden Bridge Road (A6033 road). It is about 1 metre (3 ft 3 in) high, and is inscribed with pointing hands, and the directions to Keighley, Hebden Bridge, and Halifax.
Yate House and Cottage; 53.81061°N 1.94877°W	—	Mid 18th century	The cottage was added to the house later. The building is in stone, and has chamfered quoins, a floor band, and stone slate roofs with coped gables and shaped kneelers. There are two storeys, four bays, and one added bay to the right. The doorway has Tuscan pilasters, a frieze and a pediment. Above the doorway and in the left return are a round-arched window with a keystone and imposts. The windows in the front of the main part are mullioned and transomed, and elsewhere they are mullioned.
Bank Nook; 53.80406°N 1.93390°W	—	1774	A pair of stone cottages, later combined, with rusticated quoins, a modillioned eaves cornice, and a stone slate roof with shaped kneelers. There are two storeys and two bays. In the centre are two doorways, one converted into a window, and a datestone above. In each floor are two two-light mullioned windows.
Shaw Farmhouse and barn 53.81075°N 1.95785°W	—	Late 18th century	The barn was added in the 19th century. The buildings are in stone, with stone slate roofs, and two storeys. The house has a coped gable and a shaped kneeler on the right, a single-story extension to the right, and a sill band. It contains a doorway with a plain surround and mullioned windows, and on the extension is a porch. The barn to the left has three bays, and contains a central segmental-arched cart entry with voussoirs, a doorway, windows, two lunettes, and two slit vents.
The Old Hall; 53.82053°N 1.95772°W	—	Late 18th century	The house is in stone with a stone slate roof. There are two storeys and five bays, the left part is taller. In the left part is a central doorway with Tuscan pilasters, a frieze, a cornice, and a pediment, and in the right part is an octagonal sundial. The windows in both parts are mullioned, and contain sashes, and in the gable end is a cross window. At the rear is a large blocked carriage entrance, an inserted pedimented doorway, and a round-arched stair window.
2–14 Farra Street; 53.80944°N 1.94916°W	—	Late 18th to early 19th century	A row of seven cottages of different builds stepped up a hill. They are in millstone grit, with quoins, and stone slate roofs with coped gables and kneelers. There are two storeys, and the cottages have one or two bays. Most of the windows are mullioned and there is a round-arched window with a keystone and impost blocks.
6 and 10 Hill House Lane; 53.80842°N 1.95136°W	—	Late 18th to early 19th century	Originally four back to back houses, later combined into two dwellings, they are in millstone grit, with quoins, and a stone slate roof with coped gables and shaped kneelers. There are two storeys and attics. On the front, both houses have a doorway with a fanlight and a stone lintel. In the left house the windows are sashes, and in the right house they are mullioned. The gable ends contain the original double doorways with a shared central jamb and interrupted outer jambs, and in each attic is a Venetian window with a keystone and impost blocks.
12 and 14 Hill House Lane; 53.80828°N 1.95148°W	—	Late 18th to early 19th century	A pair of cottages that were extended later in the 19th century. They are in millstone grit, and have a stone slate roof with coped gables and shaped kneelers. There are two storeys, the original part has two bays, and to the left is a taller later bay. The windows in the earlier part are mullioned with six lights each, and in the extension they are sashes.
Dunkirk Mill and mill house 53.81289°N 1.97122°W		Late 18th to early 19th century	The buildings are in millstone grit, and have stone slate roofs with coped gables. The mill has sill bands, two storeys and an attic, and eight bays. It contains a doorway with a fanlight and a stone lintel, and the windows have twelve panes. In front of the mill is a square chimney and a single-storey engine house. The house has a shaped kneeler on the right, two storeys and three bays, and it contains a doorway with a stone lintel and windows, most of which are mullioned.
Far Isle Farmhouse; 53.80177°N 1.94225°W	—	Late 18th to early 19th century	The farmhouse is in millstone grit, with quoins, and a stone slate roof. There are two storeys and three bays. The central doorway has a flush stone surround, and the windows are mullioned.
62–68 Shaw Lane; 53.81040°N 1.95808°W	—	Early 19th century	A terrace of four cottages in millstone grit that have a stone slate roof with coped gables and shaped kneelers. There are two storeys, and an outshut on the left. Each cottage has a doorway to the left, and mullioned windows, with three lights in the ground floor and four in the upper floor.
70 and 72 Shaw Lane; 53.81047°N 1.95840°W	—	Early 19th century	A pair of houses at the end of a terrace in millstone grit with quoins, and a coped gable and shaped kneeler on the right. There are two storeys, and an outshut on the right. Each cottage has a doorway to the left with a fanlight, and mullioned windows, with three lights in the ground floor and four in the upper floor.
Mill chimney 53.80910°N 1.94937°W		Early 19th century	The chimney is in millstone grit. It is circular with a corniced top, and stands on a square base with chamfered angles and moulded bands.
Moor House; 53.81662°N 1.95621°W	—	Early 19th century	A stone house with quoins, and stone slate roof with coped gables and kneelers. There are two storeys and three bays. The central doorway has pilasters, a frieze and a pediment. On the garden front is a bay window, and the other windows are sashes.
10 West Shaw Lane; 53.81176°N 1.96342°W	—	1826	Two cottages, later combined, they are in millstone grit and have a stone slate roof with coped gables and shaped kneelers. There are two storeys and two bays. One of the two doorways is blocked, and the windows are mullioned with three-lights.
13, 15, 17 and 19 Hebden Bridge Road; 53.80819°N 1.95488°W	—	Early to mid 19th century	Four cottages combined into two, the right cottage added later. They are in millstone grit, and have stone slate roofs with coped gables and shaped kneelers. There are two storeys, each original cottage has one bay, the right cottage is taller and projecting, and on the left is an outshut. The doorways have plain surrounds and the windows are mullioned.
21, 23 and 25 Hebden Bridge Road; 53.81002°N 1.95246°W		Early to mid 19th century	A row of three cottages in millstone grit that have stone slate roofs with coped gables and shaped kneelers. There are two storeys, and each cottage has one bay. The doorways are to the right, the windows are mullioned, and each cottage has a three-light window in the ground floor and a four-light window above.
22–36 Hebden Bridge Road; 53.80964°N 1.95336°W		Early to mid 19th century	A terrace of seven cottages in millstone grit that have stone slate roofs with a coped gable and shaped kneelers on the right. There are two storeys, each cottage has one bay, and some have cellars. The doorways have plain surrounds, and the windows are mullioned, with some mullions removed.
Ashleigh; 53.80985°N 1.95277°W	—	Early to mid 19th century	A house in millstone grit, with quoins, and a stone slate roof with a coped gable and shaped kneeler on the right. There are two storeys, one bay, a four-light mullioned window in each floor, and a doorway in the gable end.
Bay Horse Public House; 53.80985°N 1.95298°W		Early to mid 19th century	The public house, which was later extended to the left, is in stone, and has a stone slate roof with a coped gable and shaped kneeler on the right. The original part has two storeys and two bays, and the extension has three storeys and one bay. The windows are mullioned with two or three lights, and all the openings have flush stone surrounds.
Former Hawksbridge Baptist Church and Sunday School; 53.81429°N 1.96764°W		Early to mid 19th century	The former church and Sunday school are in stone on a plinth, and have a stone slate roof with coped gables and kneelers. There is a single storey, and seven bays along the sides. The windows have round-arched heads, and impost stones. In the gable ends are doorways and windows, and at the rear is an inscription.
Marsh Methodist Chapel; 53.81698°N 1.96179°W		1836	A Sunday school that was enlarged in 1874 to become a chapel. It is in stone with plain eaves brackets, and a stone slate roof with an iron ventilator on the ridge. There is one storey, five bays, and a cross-wing. In the main range is a pedimented gabled porch and a door with a fanlight, and the windows have round heads.
St Mary's Church; 53.80813°N 1.95563°W		1849	The church, designed by Ignatius Bonomi and J. A. Cory, is built in millstone grit with a stone slate roof, and is in Romanesque style. It consists of a nave, a north aisle, a south porch, a chancel, and a west tower. The tower has two stages, quoins, a stair tower, and a coped projecting parapet. The windows in the church are round-headed with quoined surrounds.
Milepost; 53.80614°N 1.95738°W		19th century	The milepost is on the southwest side of Hebden Bridge Road (A6033 road). It is in stone and cast iron, and has a triangular plan and a rounded top. On the top is "LEES & HEBDEN BRIDGE ROAD" and "OXENHOPE", and on the sides are the distances to Keighley and Hebden Bridge.
The Old Vicarage; 53.80807°N 1.95468°W		Mid 19th century	The vicarage, later a private house, is in millstone grit with quoins, moulded gutter brackets, and a Westmorland slate roof. There are two storeys and four bays. In the first bay is a round-arched cart way with a quoined surround. The third bay projects under a gable with carved bargeboards, the upper storey carried on stone piers. The doorway has a Tudor arched head, a quoined surround, a fanlight, and a deep lintel. The windows are sashes with mullions, and in the right return is a canted bay window.
Mounting block 53.80978°N 1.95278°W	—	Undated	The mounting block is in the forecourt of the Bay Horse Public House. It is in stone, and consists of four steps.
North Ives Bridge; 53.82015°N 1.94642°W		Undated	A former packhorse bridge, it carries a footpath over Bridgehead Beck. The bridge is in stone and consists of a single steep arch. It is narrow with parapets, and steps have been added at the ends.
