= Oxenhope =

Village in West Yorkshire, England

Coordinates: 53.812°N 1.952°W

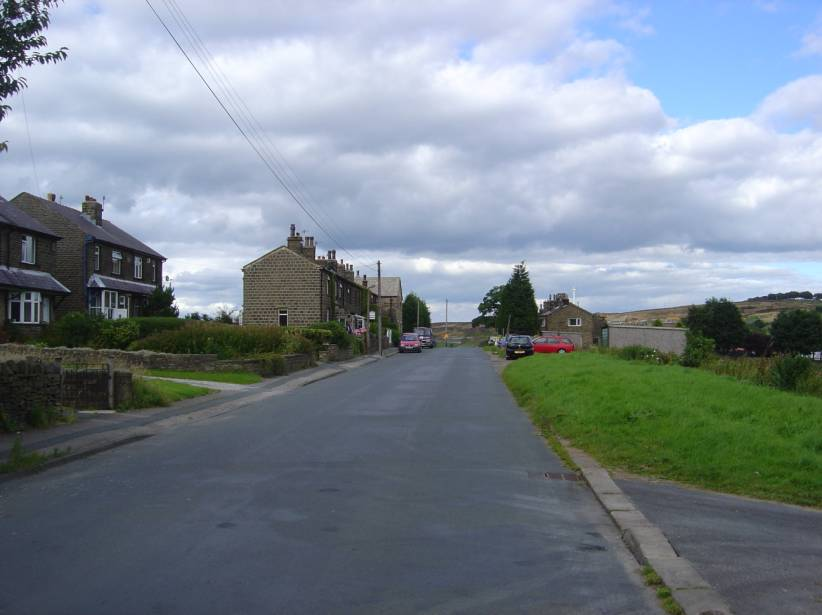
- Oxenhope, West Yorkshire

- Location within West Yorkshire
- Population: 2,626 (2011 census)
- OS grid reference: SE032351
- Civil parish: Oxenhope
- Metropolitan borough: City of Bradford
- Metropolitan county: West Yorkshire
- Region: Yorkshire and the Humber
- Country: England
- Sovereign state: United Kingdom
- Post town: KEIGHLEY
- Postcode district: BD22
- Dialling code: 01535
- Police: West Yorkshire
- Fire: West Yorkshire
- Ambulance: Yorkshire
- UK Parliament: Keighley and Ilkley

Oxenhope is a village and civil parish near Keighley in the metropolitan borough of Bradford, West Yorkshire, England. It is historically part of the West Riding of Yorkshire. The population was 2,476 at the time of the 2001 census and had increased to 2,626 at the 2011 Census. Oxenhope railway station is the terminus for the Keighley and Worth Valley Railway heritage railway.

== History ==
The name Oxenhope derives from the Old English hop which means valley head, so Oxenhope literally means Oxen Valley Head. The industrialisation of the village came about through the cloth and wool trade and by 1850 Oxenhope had more than 20 mills.

Leeming Reservoir was constructed between 1872 and 1873 to supply the many mills in the area. Its construction necessitated the closure and demolition of at least two mills and their associated houses.

The modern village of Oxenhope encompasses what were originally the separate settlements of Uppertown, Lowertown, Leeming and Horkinstone. The historic hamlets of Marsh and Shaw are also included in the village. The area became known as Oxenhope when the Railway Company named the station serving the area and opened the line from Keighley in 1867. Until then the name Oxenhope referred to a small settlement between the hamlet of Marsh and Haworth.

The street pattern of Oxenhope was much altered when the railway arrived. It had originally been intended that the railway would terminate at Haworth; however the owners of Lowertown Mill in Oxenhope persuaded the railway company to extend the line. It was found impracticable to take the railway as far as Lowertown because of the gradients that would have been required. As a compromise, the railway company built a road from its station to Lowertown, appropriately named Station Road. The bridge by which this road crosses Leeming Water is of the same construction as many of the railway's bridges.

== Culture and sport ==
The village hosts a number of annual events including a show, a beer festival (organised by Keighley and Worth Valley Railway) and a music festival at a pub.

Each summer the village holds an annual Straw Race. The race was inaugurated in 1976 and since then has raised £300,000 for charity from its participants via sponsorship. Competitors are required to carry a 20-kilogram (44 lb) bale of straw 2 1/2 miles (4.0 km) between five public houses in the Oxenhope area (including the Waggon and Horses, The Bay Horse and The Lamb) and drink a beer in each pub. The last stretch to the Dog & Gun Pub is 1 1/2 miles (2.4 km) uphill, past Leeming Reservoir. Many of the competitors wear fancy dress.

On 6 July 2014, Stage 2 of the 2014 Tour de France from York to Sheffield passed through the village. The subsequent Tour de Yorkshire cycling event also passed through the village in 2015, 2017 and 2018.

Oxenhope is represented in Association Football by Oxenhope Recreation AFC, which fields multiple teams, with the men's first team competing in the West Yorkshire Football League. Home matches are played at the Recreation Ground on Bridge Road. In cricket, Oxenhope Cricket Club competes in the Halifax Cricket League.

== Transport ==
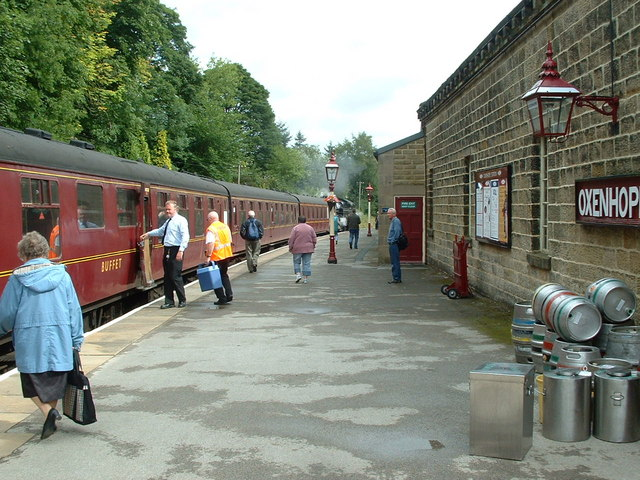
Oxenhope railway station platform, 2006

=== Road ===
The A6033 is the main road through the village. It leaves the A629 at Cross Roads and stays quite high up on the east side of the valley, bypassing the village of Haworth and eventually descending into Oxenhope, before going south-east over Oxenhope Moor to Hebden Bridge.

=== Bus ===
Transdev bus services operate to Oxenhope and beyond on an hourly basis from Keighley via Haworth. Some routes travel via Oxenhope Moor to Hebden Bridge.

In 1920 five people died when a charabanc on its way to a knur and spell match in Colne overturned near St Mary's Church. This became known as the Oxenhope Charabanc Disaster.

=== Rail ===
Oxenhope is the terminus of the Keighley and Worth Valley Railway. This route was closed by British Rail in 1962 and reopened by a group of volunteers in 1968. Trains are often steam hauled and run as a heritage rather than a commuter railway.

== Religious sites ==
There are two Methodist churches in Oxenhope; one in the village and one in Marsh hamlet north-west of Oxenhope. Both of these churches are in the Airedale Methodist Circuit. There used to be a Baptist church on Moorside Lane (Hawksbridge Baptist Church) but its congregation dwindled and in 2012 it was put up for sale. The buildings were sold and were featured on Channel 4's The Restoration Man TV show in early 2016.

The Church of England 19th-century parish church of St Mary the Virgin is on Hebden Bridge Road and has some interesting glass by the William Morris company. The church was founded by the Rev. Joseph Brett Grant at the behest of Patrick Brontë. Grant worked to fund the building of the church and a National School; Charlotte Brontë records that he wore out 80 pairs of shoes in his quest to do so. The foundation stones of the church were laid down in 1849.

== Notable people ==
- Herbert Butterfield, historian and philosopher of history was born in Oxenhope.
- John Hollingworth, actor and playwright, was raised in Oxenhope.

== Filmography ==
Oxenhope was used as setting for the film The Railway Children (starring Jenny Agutter). The Waterbury's house was set at Bents Farm, south of Haworth.

The station was also used in the TV mini series The Great Train Robbery (starring Luke Evans) in 2013.

== See also ==
- Listed buildings in Oxenhope
- Brontë Country
