= Keighley & Worth Valley Railway =

Heritage line in West Yorkshire, England

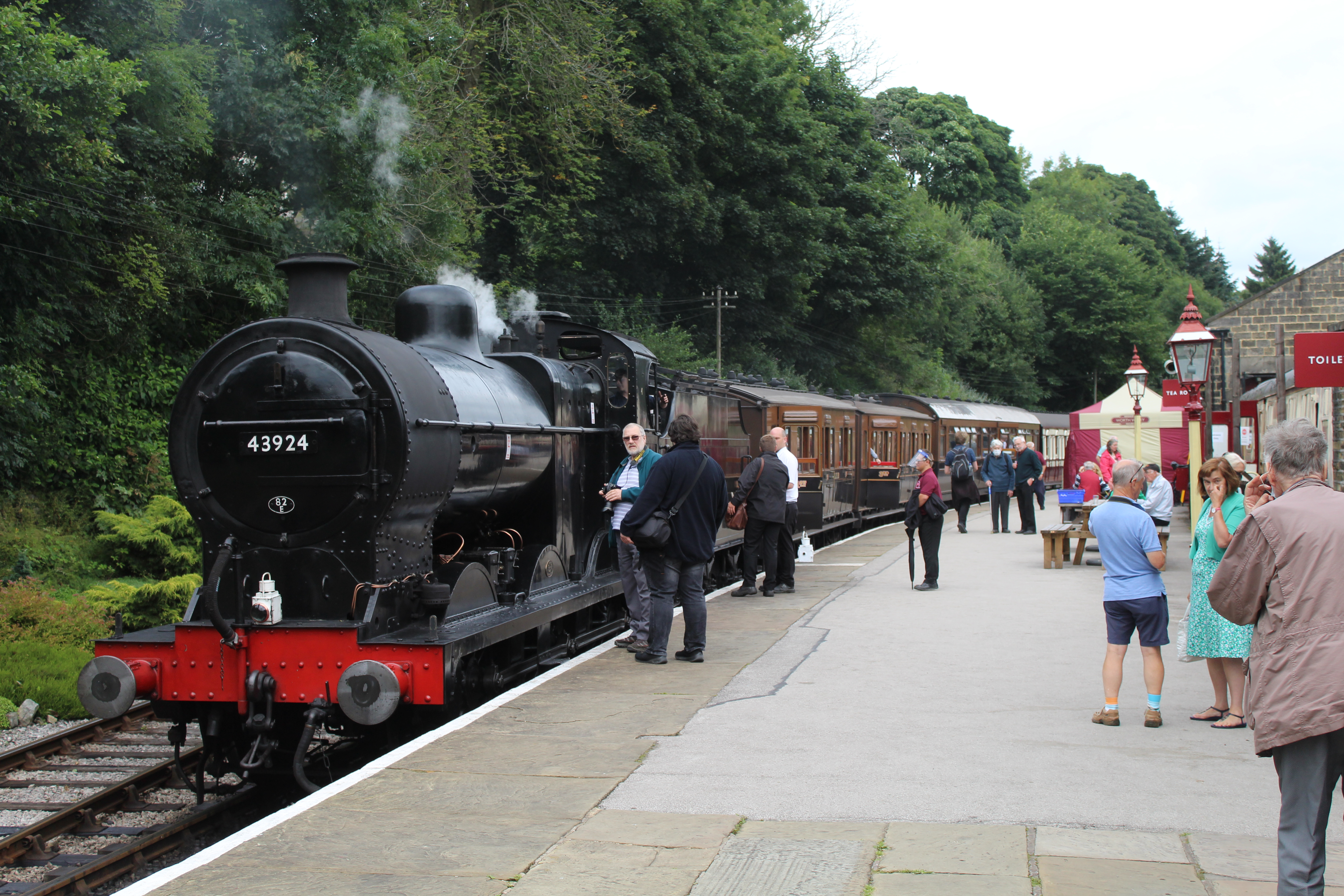
- Midland 4F 43924 at Oxenhope in 2021
- Locale: City of Bradford
- Terminus: Oxenhope
- Connections: Network Rail at Keighley

Commercial operations
- Name: Worth Valley Branch
- Original gauge: 4 ft 8 1/2 in (1,435 mm) standard gauge

Preserved operations
- Owned by: Keighley & Worth Valley Preservation Society
- Stations: 6
- Length: 5 miles (8 km)
- Preserved gauge: 4 ft 8 1/2 in (1,435 mm) standard gauge

Commercial history
- Opened: 13 April 1867; 159 years ago
- 1881: Midland Railway takes over ownership of line
- 1883: Keighley Station opened in current location
- 1884: Great Northern Railway extended into Keighley via part of the Worth Valley Branch
- 1892: Mytholmes Tunnel built
- 1923: LMS takes over ownership / operation of line
- 1948: BR takes over ownership / operation of line
- 1960: Diesel Railcars introduced
- Closed to passengers: 30 December 1961
- Closed: June 1962

Preservation history
- 1962: Keighley and Worth Valley Railway Preservation Society formed
- 1968: Worth Valley Branch reopened
- 1971: Damems loop built

Website
- https://www.kwvr.co.uk/
Route map
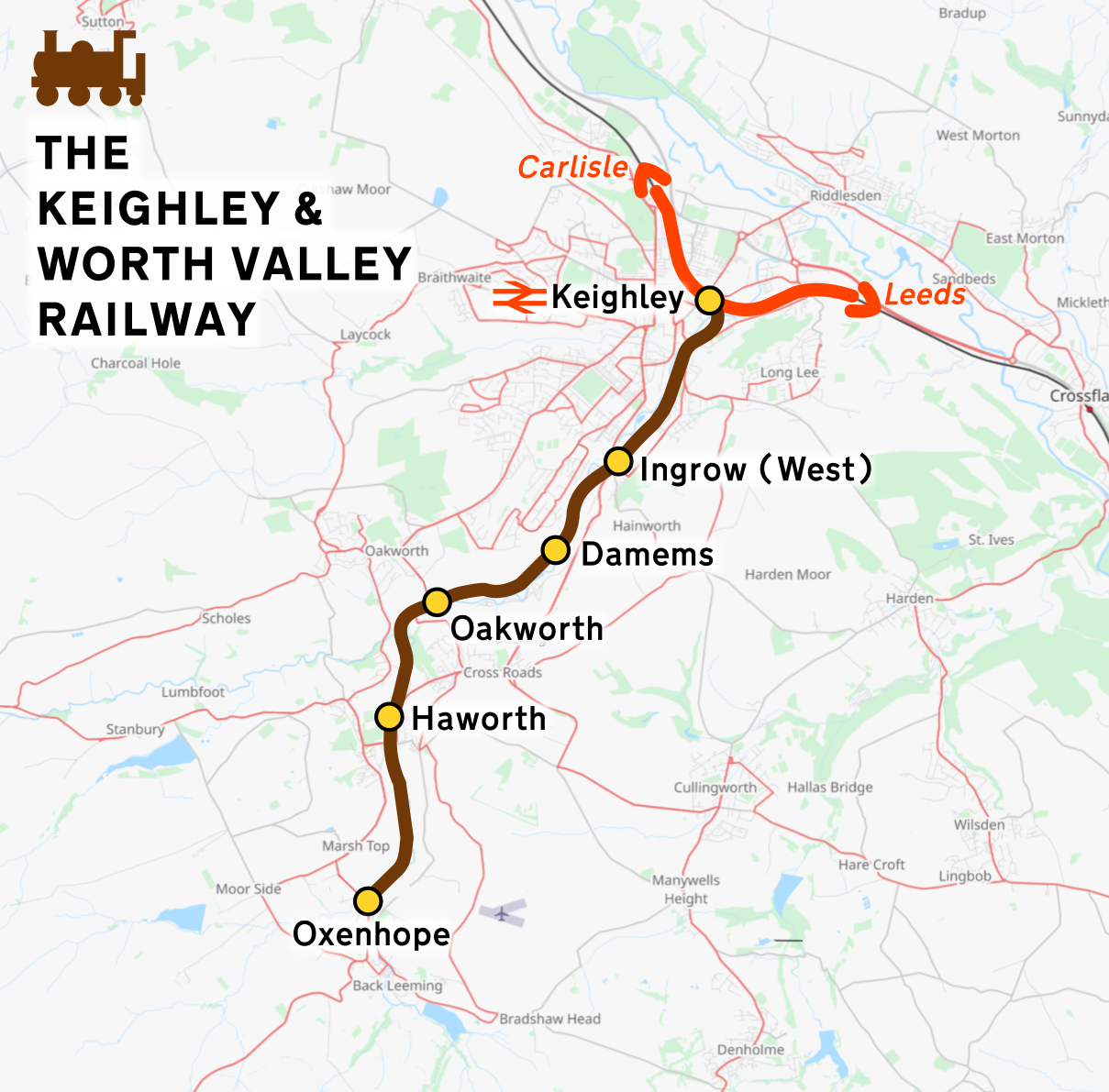

The Keighley & Worth Valley Railway (KWVR) is a 5-mile-long (8 km) heritage railway in the Worth Valley, West Yorkshire, England, which runs from Keighley to Oxenhope. It connects to the National Rail network at Keighley railway station.

== History ==
=== Inception and building of the branch ===
In 1861, John McLandsborough, a civil engineer, visited Haworth to pay tribute to Charlotte Brontë but was surprised to find that it was not served by a railway. He proposed a branch running from the Midland Railway's station at Keighley to Oxenhope. The line would serve three small towns and 15 mills along its length.

A meeting of local gentlemen was told that the line would cost £36,000 to build (equivalent to £3,700,000 in 2025). A total of 3,134 shares worth £10 each were issued at this meeting, along with the election of directors, bankers, solicitors and engineers. J. McLandsborough, the original proposer of the line (who dealt predominantly with water and sewerage engineering, but had experience of building the Otley and Ilkley Railway) was appointed acting engineer; whilst J. S. Crossley of the Midland Railway was appointed consultant engineer.

Keighley and Worth Valley Railway Act 1862
- Act of Parliament
- Parliament of the United Kingdom
- Long title: An Act for making a Railway in the West Riding of the County of York, to be called "The Keighley and Worth Valley Railway;" and for other Purposes.
- Citation: 25 & 26 Vict. c. xc

Dates
- Royal assent: 30 June 1862

Text of statute as originally enacted

The railway was incorporated by Keighley and Worth Valley Railway Act 1862 (25 & 26 Vict. c. xc) and the first sod was cut on Shrove Tuesday, 9 February 1864 by Isaac Holden, the chairman of the Keighley and Worth Valley Railway Company.

The railway was built as single track but with a trackbed wide enough to allow upgrading to double track for expansion. Although the work was estimated to take approximately one year, delays including buying land for the line, a cow eating the plans near Oakworth and engineering problems meant the work took nearly two years to complete. In particular the southern tunnel to Ingrow West had quicksand oozing through bore holes that required additional piles to be driven down to the bedrock to support and stabilise the tunnel. Unfortunately the work damaged the foundation to the Wesley Place Methodist Church resulting in the church receiving £1,980 from the railway company.

Tracklaying was completed in 1866, having started at each end and joined in the middle. The line was tested with a locomotive from Ilkley, which took nearly two hours to get from Keighley to Oxenhope, but just 13 minutes to get back. Before opening, violent storms struck the line in November of that year.

The opening ceremony was held on Saturday 13 April 1867. Unfortunately, the train got stuck on Keighley bank and again between Oakworth and Haworth, necessitating splitting it before carrying on with the journey. Finally, on 15 April 1867, public passenger services on the Worth Valley commenced.

=== Operation ===
The line was operated by the Midland Railway, who owned most of the rail network in the area, and was eventually bought by the Midland under the Midland Railway (Additional Powers) Act 1881 (44 & 45 Vict. c. cli) in part due to interest from the rival railway company, the Great Northern. Upon sale of the railway, the mill owners made a profit, which was unusual for many lines of that type, as (for strategic reasons) the Midland wanted to prevent the GN from taking over its territory. After becoming part of the London, Midland and Scottish Railway in 1923 during Grouping, ownership passed to British Railways (BR) following nationalisation in 1948.

=== Rebuilding ===
On 6 November 1892 the deviation line between Haworth and Oakworth through Mytholmes Tunnel was opened and the original route abandoned. The Midland had intended to double the entire route as the traffic was so heavy. However, due to national political developments, in particular a dispute on rates between the Railway Companies' Association and the government, the railway companies were urged by the association to cease all but essential capital expenditure. Consequently, although the parliamentary bill to double the track had been turned into an act of Parliament, the Midland decided not to double the whole route, but did undertake the necessary work on the section to avoid the trestle viaduct at Vale Mill. This is why that part of the line today looks so different from the rest of the route. The need for the deviation was to avoid a large wooden trestle viaduct that crossed a mill pond, as the locals believed the viaduct was unsafe, and supposedly many alighted at Oakworth and continued on foot to Haworth to avoid crossing the viaduct. The original trestle viaduct can be seen in a picture hanging in the booking hall of Oakworth station.

The need to increase capacity for the heavy traffic remained, so at the turn of the century, the Midland installed a passing loop at Oakworth and signalling at Haworth which gave virtually as much flexibility for dealing with the traffic as would have been the case had the line been doubled.

=== Closure ===
British Railways operated the last scheduled passenger train on Saturday 30 December 1961 and with no Sunday service the passenger service was deemed withdrawn from service on Monday 1 January 1962. Freight trains continued to run to Oxenhope until 18 June 1962. On 23 June 1962, the new formed Keighley & Worth Valley Railway Preservation Society chartered a special passenger train which ran from Bradford to Oxenhope and return. After this train, the section between Oxenhope and Ingrow West Junction was completely closed.

=== Reopening ===
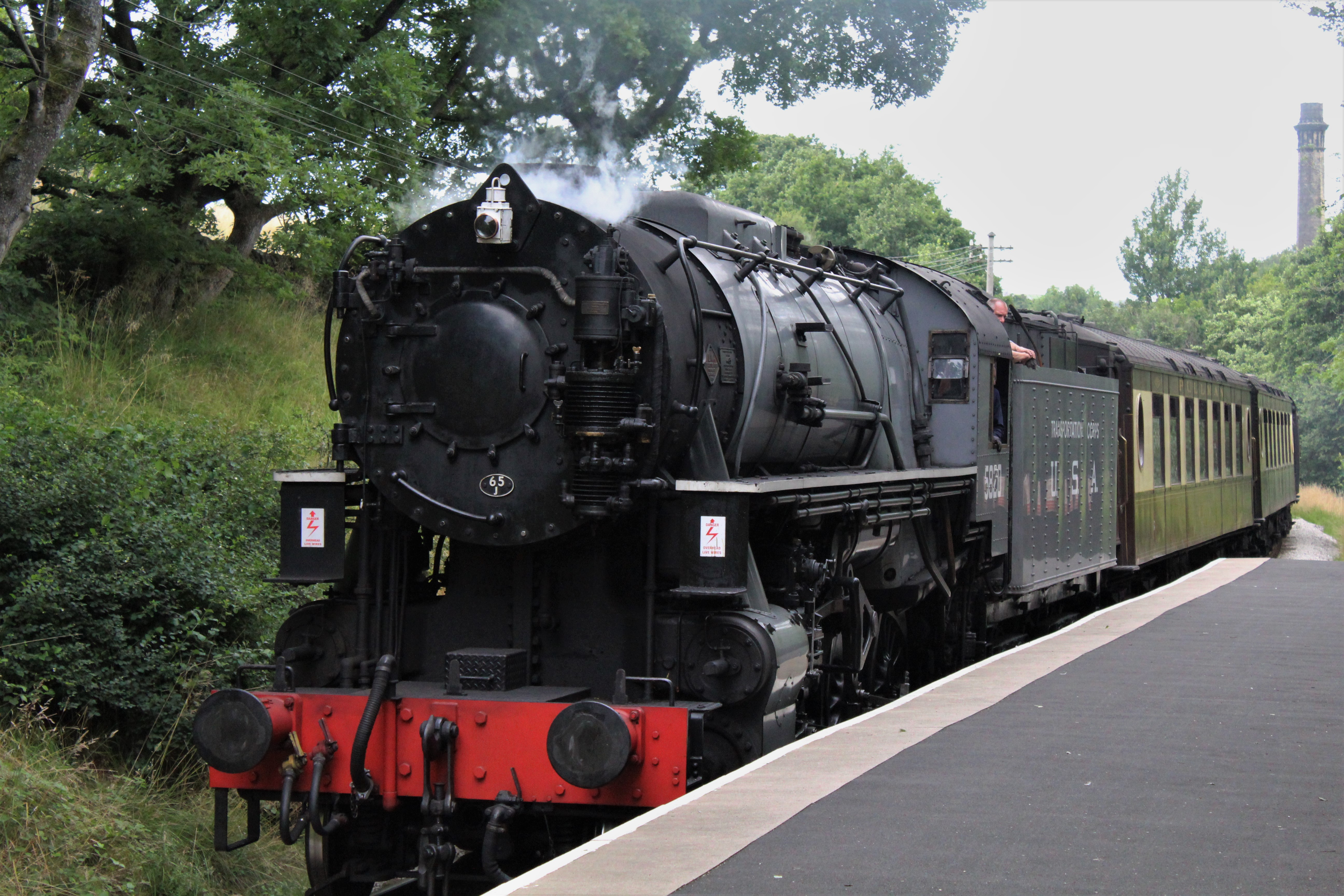
S160 'Big Jim' 5820 arrives at Haworth with a service to Oxenhope

A preservation society was formed in 1962 of rail enthusiasts and local people which bought the line from BR and reopened it on 29 June 1968 as a heritage railway. The first train to leave Keighley for Oxenhope on that date was the only train to operate anywhere on the network due to a national train strike. The line is now a major tourist attraction operated by 500+ volunteers and roughly 10 paid staff. It carries more than 100,000 passengers a year.

The KWVR is the only complete heritage railway in the UK to be preserved and operating. It has its link to the main line which is in regular use for all types of traffic, including public passenger trains and it operates the whole railway as last used by British Railways.

=== Operation as a preserved line ===
On 10 July 2008, the Duke of Kent visited the railway following the 40th anniversary of its reopening. While at the railway, the Duke travelled in the carriage and on the locomotive footplate of a specially prepared "Royal Train", consisting of tank locomotive 41241, an LMS Class 2MT, pulling a single carriage, The Old Gentleman's Saloon, as featured in The Railway Children, which is a former North Eastern Railway directors Saloon.

=== Commuter use ===
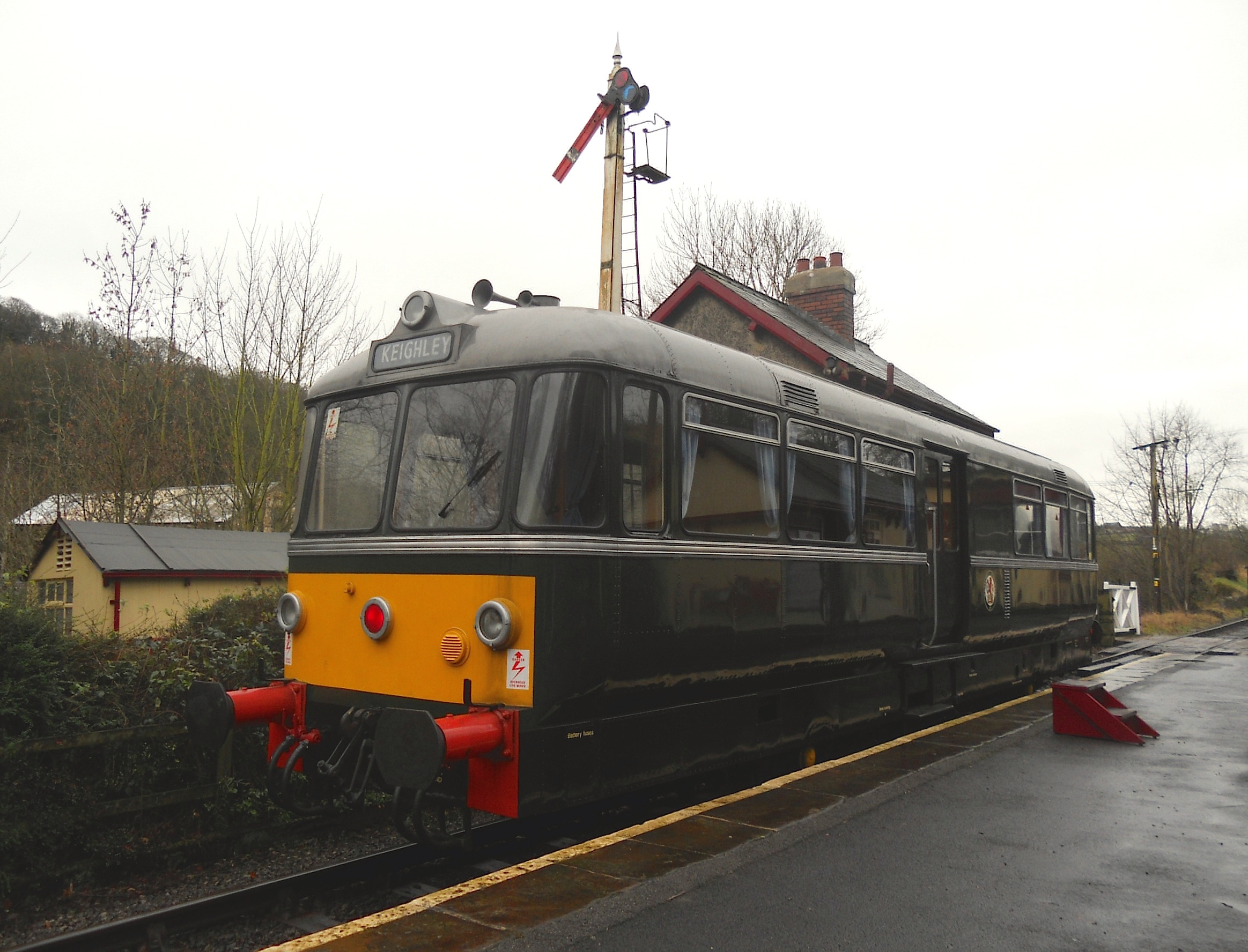
The morning diesel railbus service at Damems station

At weekends, in particular Saturday mornings, local residents who live in Oxenhope, Haworth, Oakworth and Ingrow catch the early morning diesel service to Keighley, returning later on steam hauled services. During the weekday outside of the summer months, locals instead use the local bus services.

As a privately owned heritage railway, the line does not specifically serve commuters; however, a study by Ove Arup & Partners funded by Metro looked at the feasibility of a daily commuter service between Oxenhope and Keighley in 2009. After the first stage of the study was released, Metro stated concerns about a lack of funding and available rolling stock, meaning that services are unlikely to run in the short to medium term.

Another study undertaken in 2011 on behalf of the Worth Valley Joint Transport Committee found that running up to four commuter trains each way in the morning and evening is feasible.

== Stations and facilities ==
Point	Coordinates (Links to map resources)	OS Grid Ref	Notes
Keighley	53.8679°N 1.9011°W	SE06604130	
Ingrow (West)	53.8539°N 1.9150°W	SE05683974	
Damems	53.8459°N 1.9245°W	SE05063885	
Oakworth	53.8414°N 1.9416°W	SE03943835	
Haworth	53.8312°N 1.9488°W	SE03463721	
Oxenhope	53.8154°N 1.9517°W	SE03273545	

=== Keighley ===
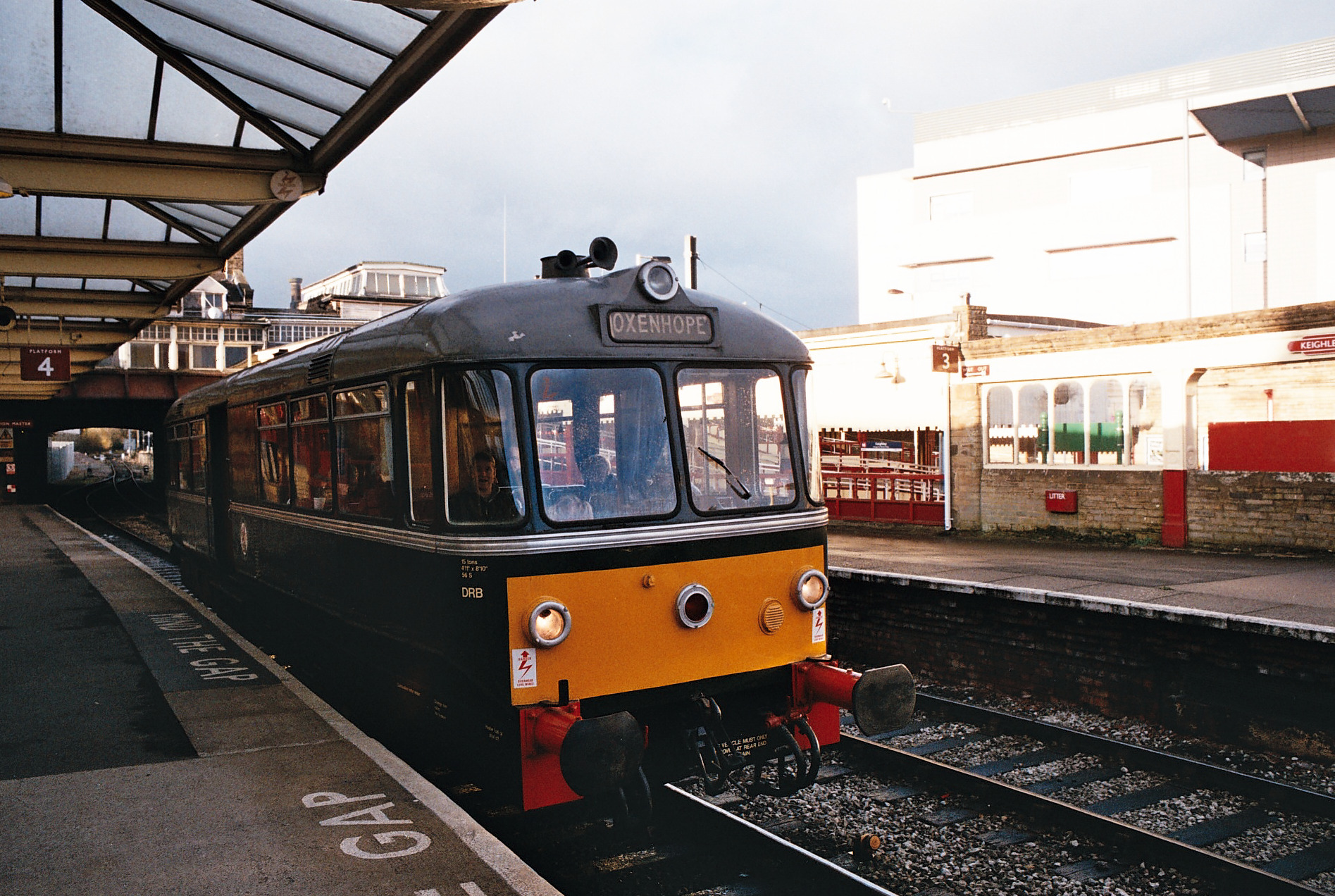
Railbus at Keighley station, 2012

- Mainline connections to Leeds, Bradford, Skipton, Carlisle, Lancaster, Morecambe and London King's Cross
- Railway shop and buffet
- Turntable
- Picnic area
- Station restored to BR 1950s condition complete with cast-iron platform canopy on Platform 4, as once existed on all of the platforms

=== Ingrow (West) ===
- Access to the Vintage Carriages Trust's Museum of Rail Travel
- Railway shop
- Access to the Bahamas Locomotive Society Museum 'Ingrow Loco'
- Car parking

=== Damems ===
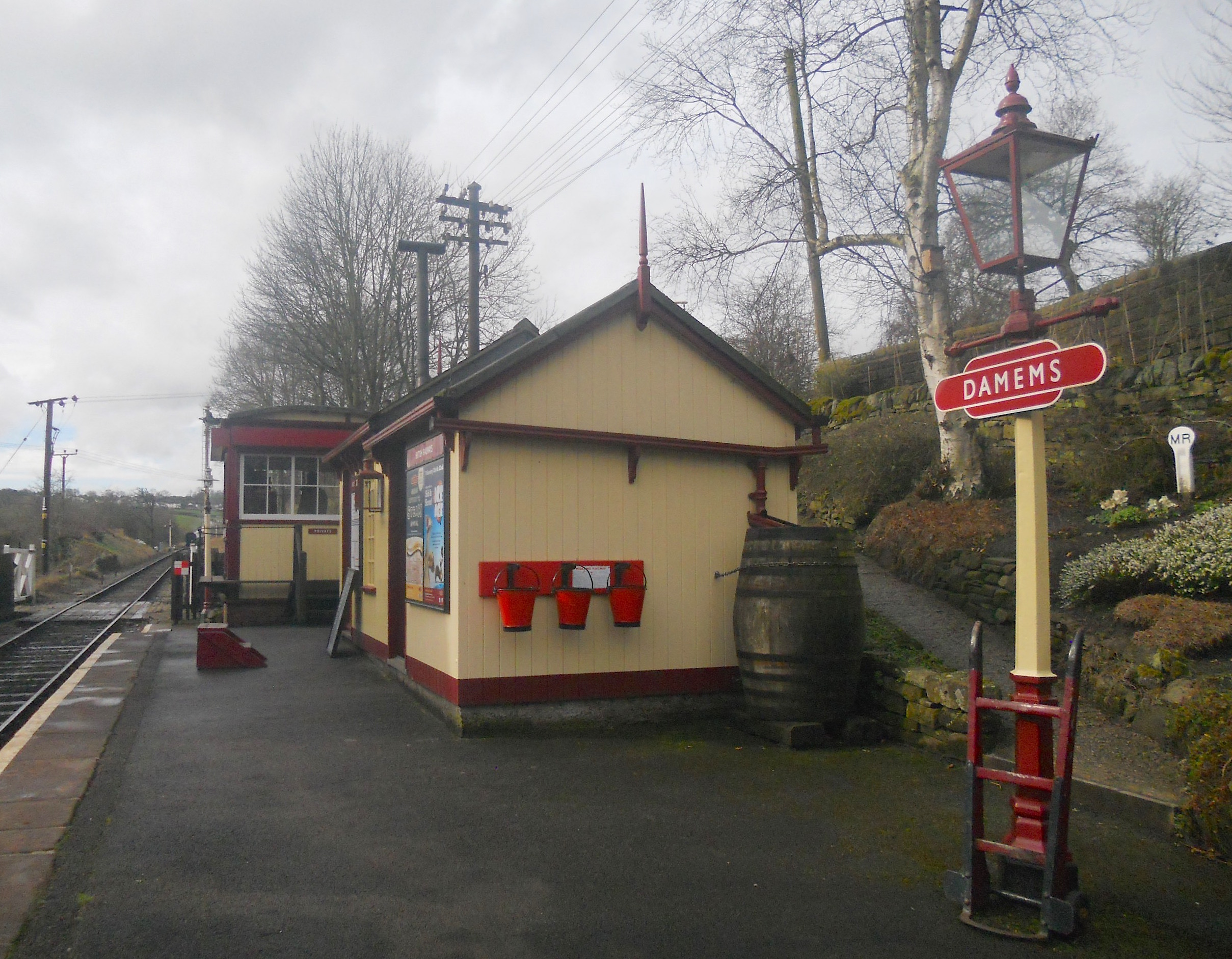
Damems station, March 2017

- The smallest standard-gauge railway station in Britain, complete with waiting room, booking office, signal box and level crossing
- Lit by gas and heated by coal stoves
- It is mostly used by passengers changing trains, usually during busy periods, such as gala events
- Featured as Ormston in the BBC's Born and Bred

=== Oakworth ===
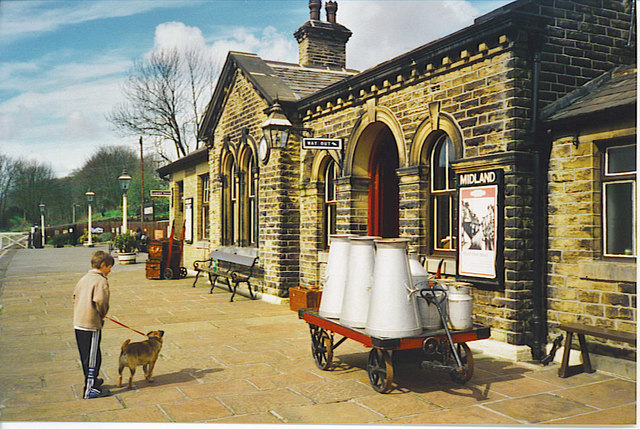
Oakworth station, April 2000

- Famous as the location for the filming of the 1970 film The Railway Children, starring Jenny Agutter, Dinah Sheridan, Bernard Cribbins, Sally Thomsett and Gary Warren
- Restored to Edwardian condition, the station is lit by gas lamps
- Heated by up to four coal fires in winter
- Civil Engineering yard, containing all engineering wagons (not open to public)
- Car parking (for 'Horseless Carriages')
- A recently added Tea Hut, which serves hot and cold drinks and light refreshments

=== Haworth ===
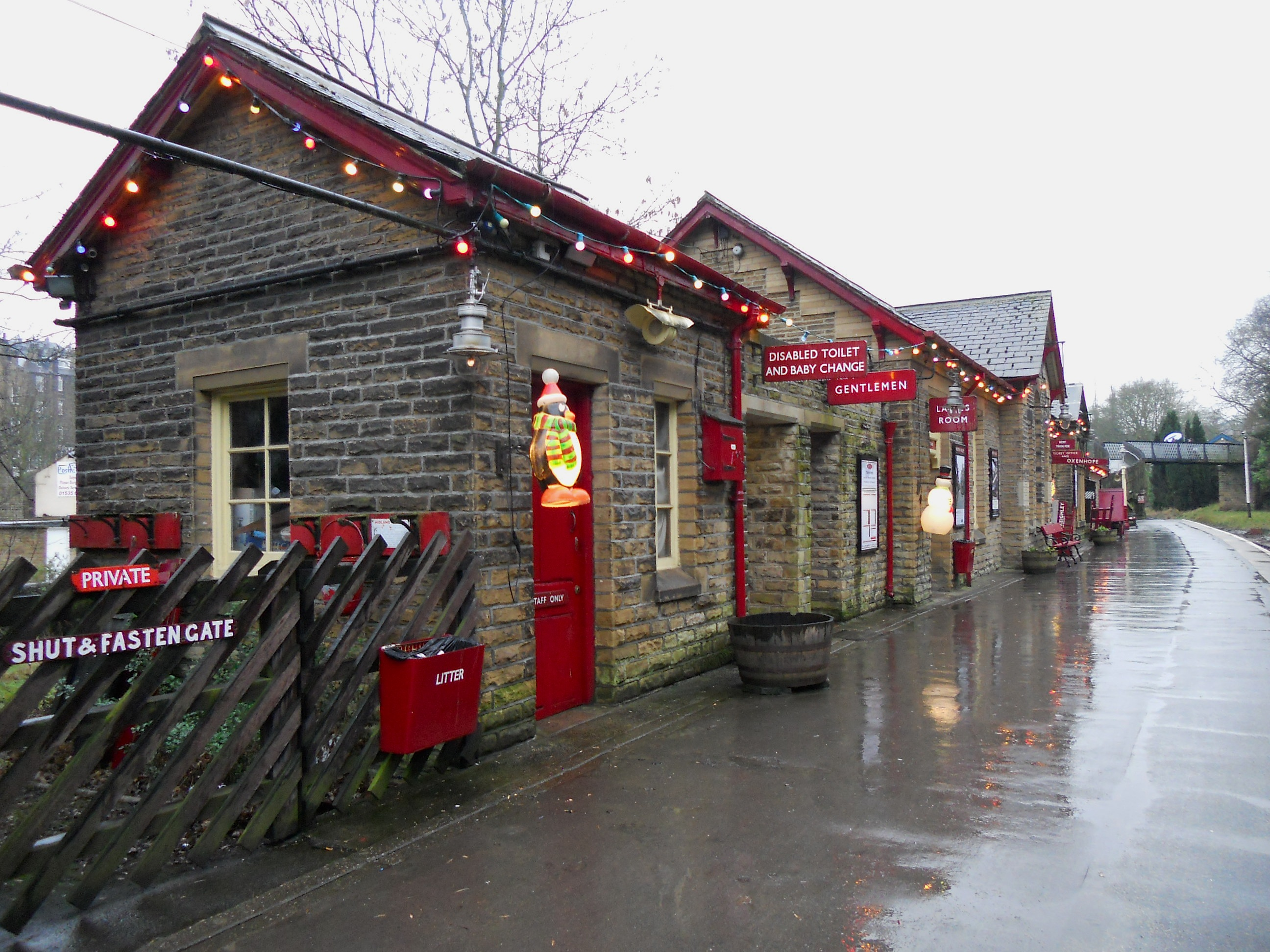
Haworth station, December 2011

- Railway shop
- Motive Power & Civil Engineering Departments situated here (Not open to the public, although guided tours are run on peak days)
- Picnic area and engine shed viewing area
- Access to Haworth village and the Brontë Parsonage
- Gas lit platform
- An example of a 1950s country station

=== Oxenhope ===
- Terminus of the branch (Located at around 660 feet (201 m) above sea level)
- New Heritage Lottery Fund-supported exhibition shed; contains locomotives and carriages not currently in use and explains their history and that of the line as a whole
- Carriage & Wagon Maintenance department (Not open to the public)
- Buffet (converted from BR Mk1 RMB No. 1824) and railway shop.
- Car parking
- Bus connections to Hebden Bridge
- Gas-lit platform, car park and waiting room

== Rolling stock ==
The KWVR has a large collection of both steam and diesel locomotives, as well as supporting carriages and other rolling stock. The railway has amassed a large collection of Vintage Carriages over the years. Some are used to carry passengers on specially selected open days.

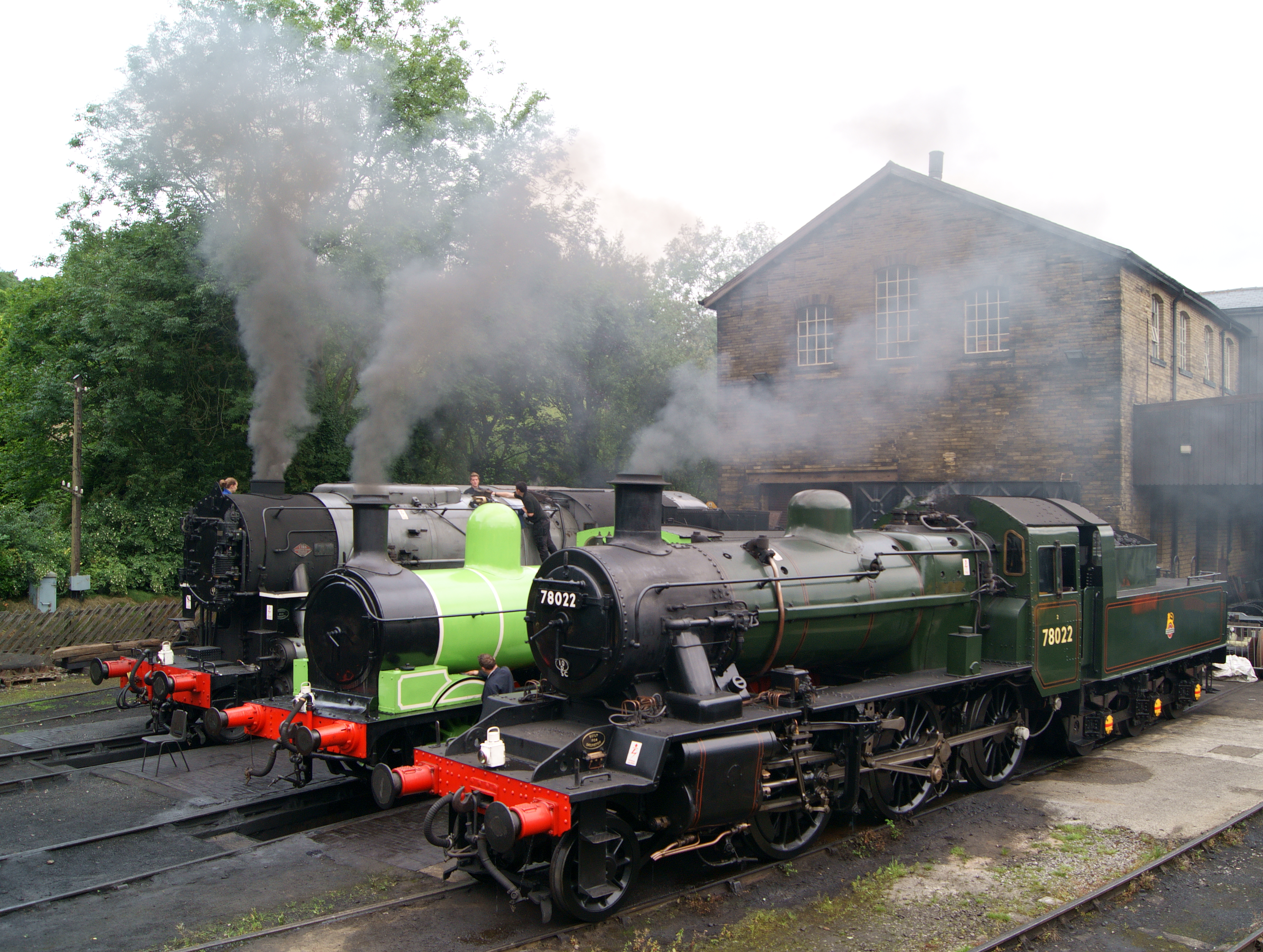
The early morning fire-up of steam locomotives on the KWVR, September 2021

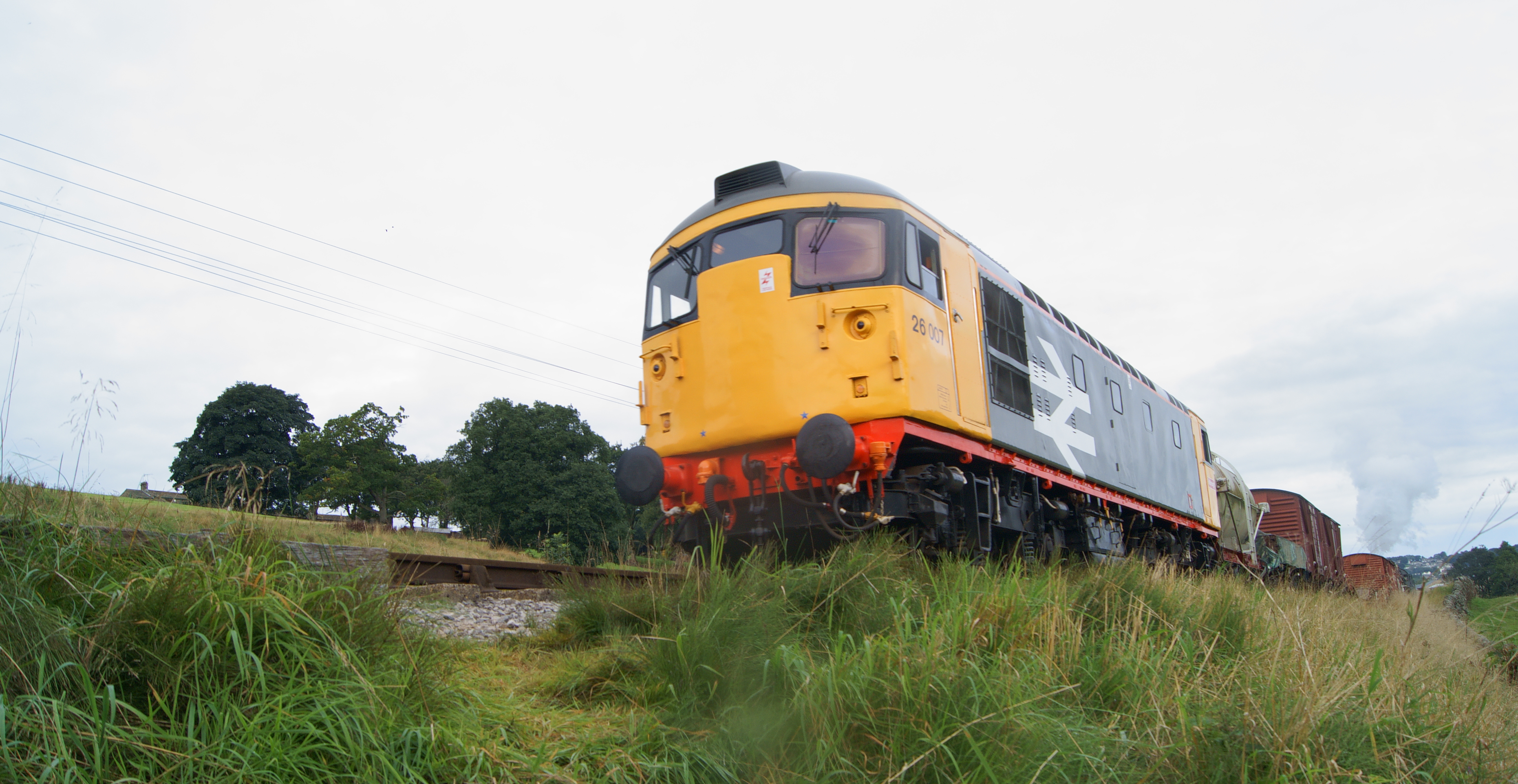
Restored Class 26, 26007, on the Keighley & Worth Valley Railway, September 2021

The railway owns three rail mounted cranes: a 10T Grafton steam P-Way crane, a 15T Taylor Hubbard diesel P-Way Crane and an ex LMS 45T steam breakdown crane. In addition, the affiliated Bahamas Locomotive Society owns a steam breakdown crane, based at Ingrow. Currently the 15T Taylor Hubbard crane and the 10T Grafton steam P-Way crane are in traffic, the latter now in apple green. Furthermore, there are a variety of wagons used by the civil engineering department, largely at either Oakworth or Ingrow West.

== Use in film, media and television ==
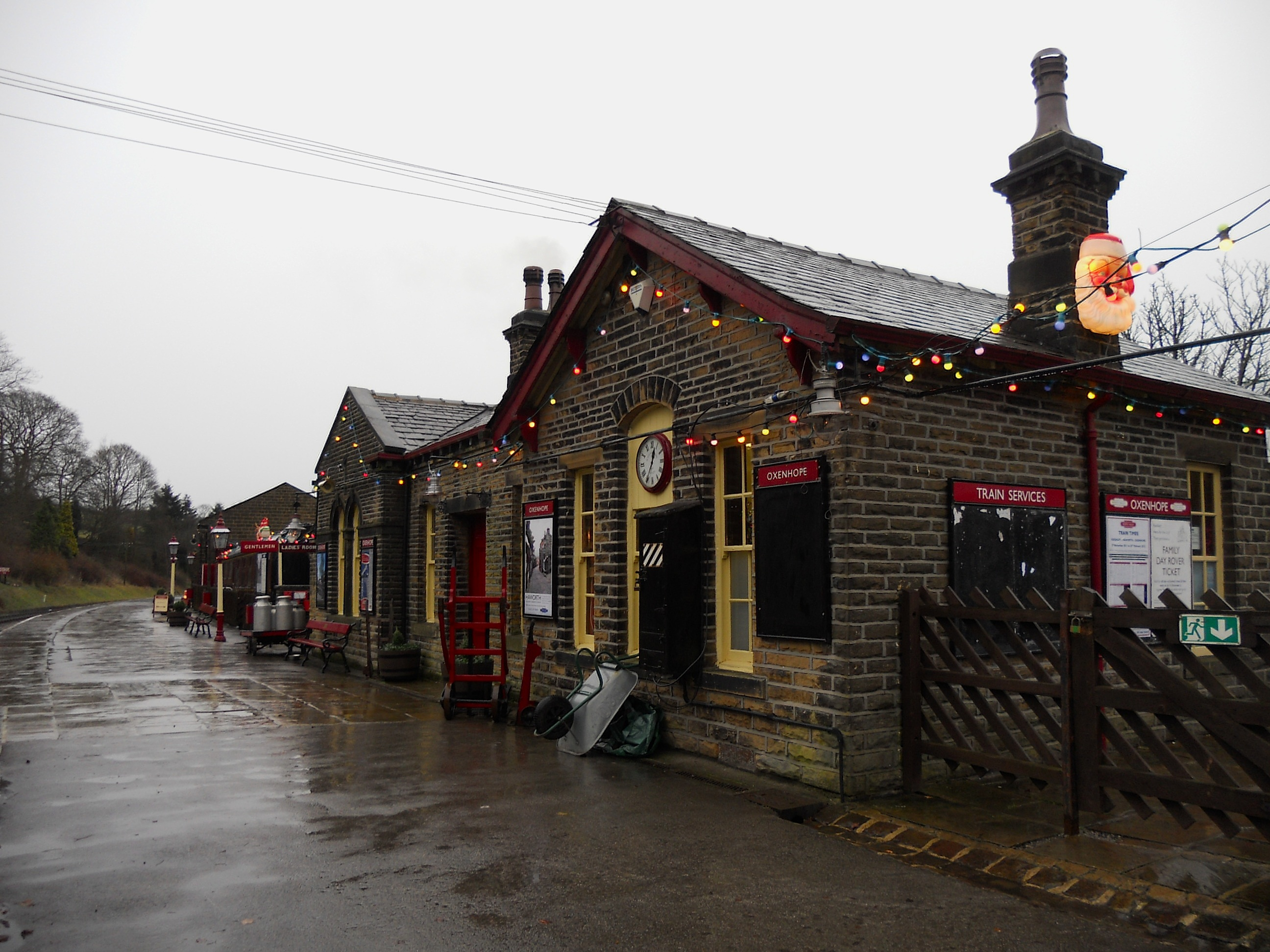
Oxenhope station, December 2011

The line and its stations has been used in numerous period film and television productions including the film The Railway Children.

In the 1960s (shortly before the preserved line re-opened), an ITV advertisement on chocolate cookie biscuits, featuring Ronnie Corbett, was filmed along the line and at Mytholmes Tunnel (between Oakworth and Haworth). A steam train carries (at the front end) out of the tunnel a shocked Corbett holding onto the handrail of the engine. The locomotive used was Pug 51218.

In 1970 the line was featured in the British drama film The Railway Children. The line was then one of only a few heritage railways in the UK and was the only one at the time which had a tunnel (this was one of the most important locations needed for the film). The tunnel used is a lot shorter in reality than it appears in the film, for which a temporary extension to the tunnel was made using canvas covers. Locomotives that were chosen for the film included a Hudswell Clarke 0-6-0T No. 31 Hamburg, GWR 5700 0-6-0PT No. 5775, Lancashire & Yorkshire Railway 0-6-0 No. 957 & GNR N2 0-6-2T No. 1744. Railway locations used in the film included Mytholmes Tunnel near Haworth, the location for the paper chase scene was also shot at Mytholmes, as well as the one in which the children wave the girls' petticoats in the air to warn the train about a landslide. The landslide sequence itself was filmed in a cutting on the Oakworth side of Mytholmes Tunnel and the fields of long grass where the children waved to the trains are situated on the Haworth side of the tunnel.

In 1976, The KWVR and Haworth railway station appeared in the premiere episode of a Granada TV sitcom called Yanks Go Home (set in 1942), in which a group of US Army Air Force pilots arrive by train and alight at the station (Haworth) and are stationed in a small Northern town in Lancashire, North-West of England, during the Second World War.

In 1979, an episode of the long-running BBC sitcom Last of the Summer Wine was filmed partly along the Worth Valley route, in which the three main characters Compo, Clegg & Foggy visit and then to attempt to stop a runaway steam train having pulled the brake on purpose (and then only to drive upwards and downwards). The locomotive used was Pannier 5775 in its London Transport guise as L89.

In 1981, a scene from Alan Parker's film Pink Floyd - The Wall was filmed at the entrance to the Mytholmes Tunnel, and others at the line's stations. The steam locomotive used in the film was LMS Stanier Class 8F No. 8431.

Fairy Tale: A True Story (1997) also used the line for filming.

The railway was used in the filming of Peaky Blinders, a 2013 BBC television drama about Birmingham criminals just after the First World War. The same year, scenes were filmed for the dramatisation of The Great Train Robbery: A Coppers Tale, with locations in West Yorkshire acting as Cheddington's Aylesbury bound platform.

In 2014, Keighley station was featured extensively in the feature-film 'Testament of Youth', as were the interiors of some of the railway's vintage coaches.

In 2015, the railway was used for numerous scenes in the 2016 film Swallows and Amazons.

The steam-hauled train seen in All Creatures Great and Small was filmed on the Keighley & Worth Valley Railway line; Keighley station stands in for a Glasgow station in the first episode, and Oakworth station appears in both the first and second episodes.

According to Screen Yorkshire, other productions that filmed scenes on the railway include "the new Netflix mini-series The English Game, as well as ... Testament of Youth, Brideshead Revisited ... and Agatha Christie's 2018 The ABC Murders. In the 2019 Keira Knightley movie Official Secrets, the railway depicted Cheltenham Spa station".

In January 2022, trainspotter Francis Bourgeois was featured in the second chapter of a partnership between Gucci and The North Face. In the photographs and a promotional short film by Highsnobiety, he plays the part of a train conductor. The film, Full Steam Ahead with Francis Bourgeois, features Oakworth station on the Keighley & Worth Valley Railway, and 2MT locomotive No. 78022. The film won the award for "best fashion film" at Berlin Fashion Film Festival 2022.

The railway has also appeared in All Creatures Great and Small, with Oakworth station being a filming location.
