= Virol =

British 20th-century malt extract

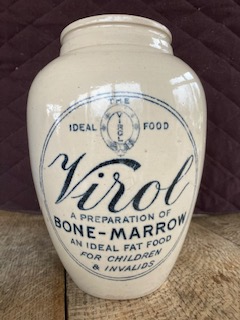
Virol jar

Virol, also stylised as ViRoL, was a British twentieth-century brand of malt extract preparation that also included bone marrow, and was designed as a nutritional supplement for the feeding of infants.

== Ingredients ==
The original ingredients of Virol were red marrow extracted by the use of glycerol from the rib bones of cattle and the bones of calves, refined beef fat, diastatic malt (containing a mixture of amylases that convert starch into maltose and dextrin), eggs, lemon syrup and soluble phosphates. This emulsified product was rich in nutrients and the manufacturing process did not destroy the vitamin content. Later, orange juice replaced lemon juice.

== Ownership and production ==
Virol was first made in 1899 as an experimental product by Bovril in their London factory in Old Street, and was designed as a nutritional supplement for the feeding of infants. A company was set up to manufacture it the following year. Demand grew, and by the 1920s, production was transferred to a larger, more modern factory in Perivale. Before World War II, the version "Virol and Milk" was established as a direct competitor to Horlicks. During the war, production ceased as the ingredients became too difficult or costly to acquire. After the war, production resumed and the brand changed hands several times with consolidation in the food processing industry, to Cavenham Foods in 1971, Janks Brothers in 1977, and Optrex in 1979. Virol was discontinued in the 1980s.

== Promotion and purposes ==
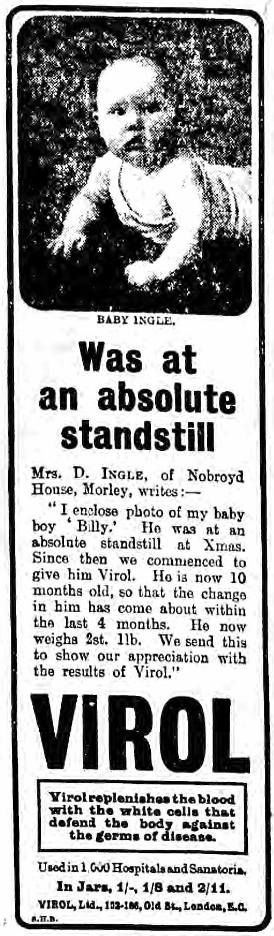
Virol print advertisement from 1914

In 1929, the product was exhibited at the British Industries Fair.

Originally designed as a nutritional supplement for the feeding of infants, some children who grew up in the 1940s remember the weekly visit of the Virol Lady to their primary school, doling out spoonfuls of the sweet, sticky brown product to each child who had brought a penny to school for the purpose.

Virol was initially supplied in ceramic jars of different sizes. By the 1950s it was marketed in brown glass jars as a health supplement. Alternative suggested usages were as a nerve tonic to treat depression and nervousness, for which purpose it was called "Virol and Milk", and as a laxative under the trade name "Virolax".

The product was advertised on orange-navy-and-white, enamelled metal wall plaques as being of benefit to various groups; "Anaemic girls need it", "Growing boys need it", "School children need it", "Delicate children need it" and the more generic "For health and vitality". In an advertisement in Punch magazine in November 1950, an illustration of a boy giving a girl a piggyback was accompanied by the slogan "CHILDREN GROW STRONG ON VIROL. Virol is the food for growth. It provides these essential food factors – not vitamins alone, but also many others just as important – which are likely to be deficient in the rest of the diet. Give Virol after every meal. Children love the flavour of Virol and they thrive on it."

== See also ==
- Extract of malt
