= Oxenhope railway station =

Railway station in West Yorkshire, England

Oxenhope
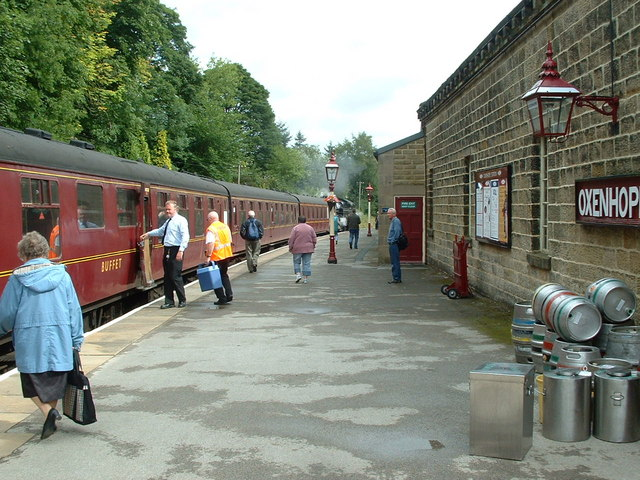
- The platform at Oxenhope station

General information
- Location: Oxenhope, City of Bradford; England
- Coordinates: 53.815440°N 1.951860°W
- Grid reference: SE032354
- System: Station on heritage railway
- Manager: Keighley and Worth Valley Railway
- Platforms: 1

History
- Opened: 1867; Closed 1962; Reopened 1968
Location

Oxenhope railway station serves the village of Oxenhope, near Haworth, and within the City of Bradford Metropolitan District of West Yorkshire, England. It is the terminus of the Keighley & Worth Valley Railway, with trains to Haworth and Keighley.

== History ==
Oxenhope village was not included in the Midland Railway's original plans for the branch line, with Haworth being the proposed terminus. However, a local mill owner successfully campaigned for the railway to be extended to Oxenhope, and the station opened on 13 April 1867, as the railway's terminus. On the original plans the railway was to extend into Lowertown, and there is still a bridge (used as a road bridge) which was constructed as part of the railway to allow this; however, it was decided to terminate the railway at its current location.

As with the rest of the line's facilities, the station was closed in 1962 by British Rail due to road competition, but was re-opened when the line was preserved in 1968.

== Stationmasters ==
- J. Bakewell until 1873
- H. Hawkins 1873 - 1874
- T. Peel 1874
- William White 1874 - 1876 (formerly station master at Halton, afterwards station master at Heath Town)
- J. Beaumont 1876 - 1877
- W. Small 1877 - 1879
- T. Collett 1879 - 1885
- Thomas Mason 1885 - 1893
- C.F. Rolinson 1894 - 1896
- J.W. Teal 1896 - 1898
- James Staff 1898 - 1900 (afterwards station master at Gargrave)
- Abraham Fearn 1901 - ca. 1908 (afterwards station master at Settle)
- Frederick Orbell ca. 1914 - 1938 (afterwards station master at Bingley)
- E. Crossley 1938 - 1947 (also station master at Haworth)

== Preservation era ==
The site complex now houses an exhibition shed, funded by the Heritage Lottery Fund, where some of the locomotives that are not currently used on the line are stored. There is also a station shop, buffet and a car park, and links with local bus services to Bradford and Hebden Bridge.

When the railway was reopened, it was envisaged that as the terminus of the line, Oxenhope would be the ideal place to base the locomotive department. To this end, the goods shed was extended with a two-road building including an inspection pit.

However, the locomotive department once settled in Haworth never moved, so the intended locomotive shed is now the headquarters of the railway's Carriage & Wagon department, having workshop facilities, carriage-lifting jacks and extensive stores.

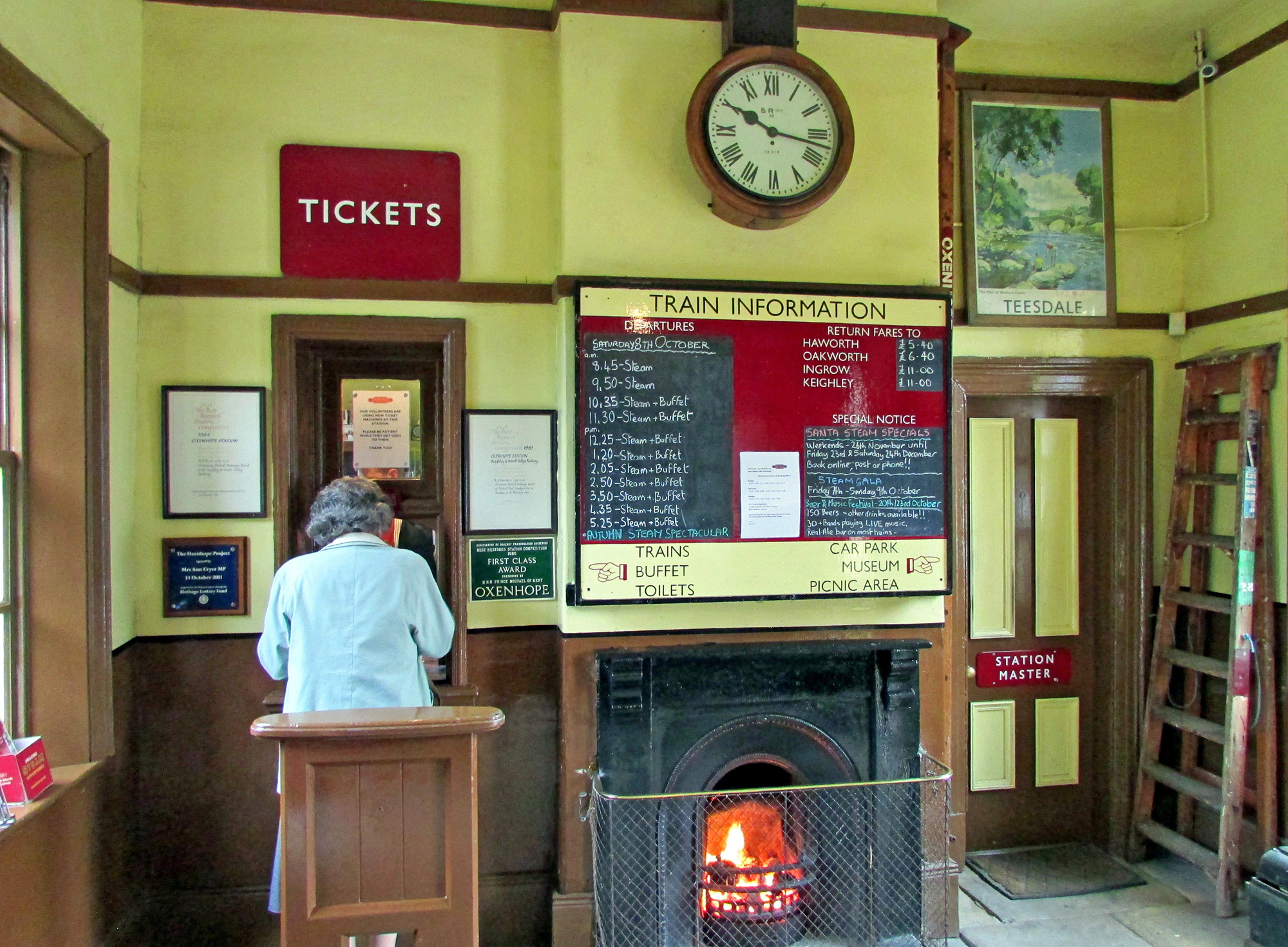
Oxenhope station booking office in 2016

Thanks to a £600,000 grant from the Heritage Lottery Fund in 2000, there is now also a large two-road, twelve-coach 'running shed' used to stable coaches normally used on service trains. It also has facilities for servicing coaches and provides a more hospitable environment for light maintenance.

Also located at Oxenhope is the railway's 'Beer Store'. When the railway reopened, it had the facility to serve 'Real Ale' on board trains as a dig at British Rail, who were unable to do so on their new Inter City buffet cars. Because normal cask ale cannot be used on a train (the movement would shake up the sediment in the barrel and result in an undrinkable pint), the beer is stored at Oxenhope and decanted into containers for use on trains.

Preceding station	Heritage railways	Following station
Terminus	Keighley & Worth Valley Railway	Haworth towards Keighley
