= South Elmsall Challenge Cup =

- Founded: 1930
- Abolished: 1940
- Region: South Elmsall, West Yorkshire
- Most championships: Askern Welfare; South Kirkby Common Road (2 titles)

The South Elmsall Challenge Cup was an amateur, English association football cup competition based in South Elmsall, West Yorkshire, and surrounding area.

== Founding season ==
The cup was founded in October 1930, with an initial 16 football clubs joining the draw for the first round. Those founding members were:

- Brodsworth St. Michael's
- Crofton and Sharlston
- Frickley Colliery Juniors
- Hemsworth Amateurs
- Hemsworth Victoria Rovers
- Hemsworth White Rose
- Hemsworth Y.M.C.A.
- Horbury United
- Kinsley Athletic
- Moorthorpe Rangers
- Nostell Miners Welfare
- Skellow Athletic
- South Kirkby Carr Lane
- South Kirkby Common Road
- South Kirkby Wednesday
- Upton Colliery

== Champions ==
1930–31

The 1930–31 season was the first year the competition took place. The finalists were South Kirkby Common Road and Hemsworth Victoria Rovers, with the Hemsworth side prevailing. In a remarkable season Hemsworth Victoria Rovers also won the South Kirkby Football League and were beaten semi-finalists in the Pontefract Infirmary Cup and beaten finalists in the Doncaster Infirmary Shield.

1931–32

In the 1931–32 season a record 19 teams entered the first round draw. The final was held at Westfield Lane, home of Frickley Colliery, with South Kirkby Common Road beating Moorthorpe Rangers.

1932–33

The 1932–33 season saw Moorthorpe Rangers reach their second successive final, which again they lost, this time to Hemsworth Albion at Westfield Lane. At the end of the season Moorthorpe Rangers folded despite being one of the most successful junior football clubs in the district. Over 800 spectators crammed into the South Kirkby Miner's Welfare Ground to watch Hemsworth Albion win their semi-final replay.

1933–34

In the 1933–34 season Askern Welfare beat South Kirkby Wednesday in the final.

1934–45

The 1934–35 season final saw a losing return to the final for Askern Welfare, with Ackworth claiming the cup, presented to them by Councillor A. Flavell.

1935–36

In the 1935–36 season Askern Welfare defeated Fitzwilliam Foresters, claiming the trophy for the second time.

1936–37

The 1936–37 season saw South Kirkby Common Road beat South Kirkby Rovers in the final, held at Frickley Colliery's Westfield Lane. The win gave Common Road their second Elmsall Cup trophy, equalling the record of Askern Welfare.

1937–38

In the 1937–38 season Ridgill beat South Kikby Common Road in a replayed final.

1938–39

The 1938–39 season was a victorious one for Minsthorpe W.M.C. who hammered Upton Brookside six nil in the final in front of a record attendance. Two brothers were instrumental in the win, with Joe Sausse grabbing a hat-trick and Jim Sausse bagging two. In a curious twist Minsthorpe finished as runners up to Upton Brookside in the South Kirkby Football League this season.

1939–40

The last known record of the 1939–40 season was the semi-final draw which saw holders Minsthorpe W.M.C. v Upton Brookside or Gibson's Sports and South Kirkby Juniors v Park Estate Rangers. It is not known who won the cup or if the competition was abandoned due to the outbreak of war as no records beyond December 1939 appear to exist.

Season	
1930–31	Hemsworth Victoria Rovers
1931–32	South Kirkby Common Road
1932–33	Hemsworth Albion
1933–34	Askern Welfare
1934–35	Ackworth
1935–36	Askern Welfare
1936–37	South Kirkby Common Road
1937–38	Ridgill
1938–39	Minsthorpe W.M.C.
