= North Elmsall =

Village and civil parish in West Yorkshire, England

Coordinates: 53.609°N 1.282°W

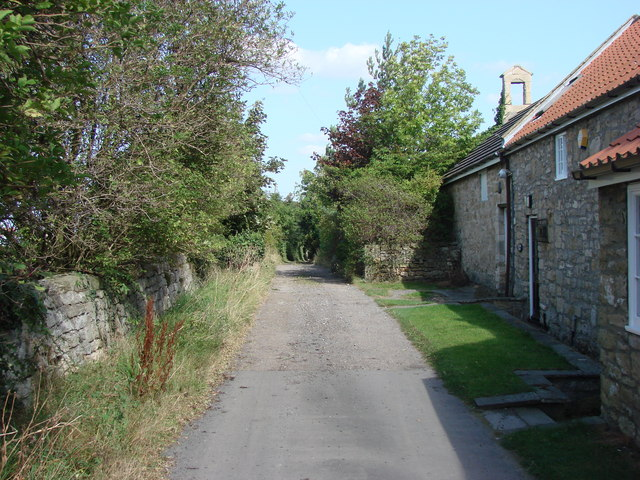

- Location within West Yorkshire
- Population: 3,873 (2011 Census)
- OS grid reference: SE4960713634
- Civil parish: Upton and North Elmsall
- Metropolitan borough: City of Wakefield
- Metropolitan county: West Yorkshire
- Region: Yorkshire and the Humber
- Country: England
- Sovereign state: United Kingdom
- Post town: PONTEFRACT
- Postcode district: WF9
- Dialling code: 01977
- Police: West Yorkshire
- Fire: West Yorkshire
- Ambulance: Yorkshire
- UK Parliament: Normanton and Hemsworth

North Elmsall (/ˈɛmsəl/ EM-səl) is a village in the civil parish of Upton and North Elmsall, in the City of Wakefield district in West Yorkshire, England. The parish had a population of 4,093 in 2001 and 3,873 in 2011. Until 1974 it was part of Hemsworth Rural District. The parish is seven miles from Pontefract, nine miles from Barnsley and Doncaster, and eleven miles from Wakefield.

In 1887, North Elmsall was described as

North Elmsall, ry. sta. (Upton and North Elmsall), E. div. West-Riding Yorkshire, 7 miles SE. of Pontefract.

== History ==
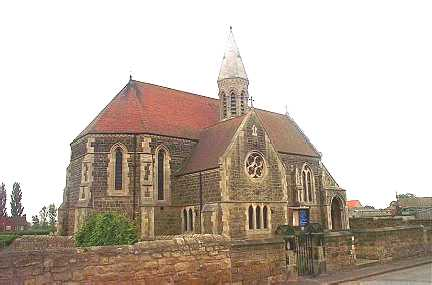
St Margaret's, the Grade II listed church in North Elmsall

The name 'Elmsall' is derived from the Old-English 'elm', literally meaning an elm tree, and the Anglian 'halh', meaning a nook of land or a small valley.

A prominent landmark in North Elmsall is St Margaret's church, on Hall Lane, which was built in 1896 and is still in use. However, an earlier acknowledgement of a settlement in this area can be found in the Domesday Book. The book lists Elmsall in the Osgodcross Hundred, with 1 villager and 5 smallholders. The total tax assessed was 8 geld units, which was very large in comparison to other Domesday settlements. Other evidence has also been found in the area of settlements dating back to the 13th or 14th century, as a medieval brooch was found in a field. St Margaret's Church has been a Grade II listed building since 2001, giving the building a protected status by English Heritage. The church is just one of eight Grade II listed buildings in the parish, many of which date back to the 18th century. The church was designed by A H Hoole of London, and paid for by Mrs Georgina Longueville-Jones, of whom there is a marble bust in the vestry. St Margaret's also contains a memorial for those from the parish who died fighting for their country in the First World War.

Other listed buildings in North Elmsall include The Old Hall, thought to be built in around the 17th century or earlier and Lodge Farmhouse, built around 1800, and its nearby coach house and barn.

Arguably the most famous former inhabitant of the village was Colonel John Morris, who later resided in East Hague, South Kirkby, prior to being executed for treason. The Wentworth family of North Elmsall were also prominent, with their ancestry in the village dating back to at least the early 1400s.

== Governance ==
From 1894, North Elmsall was part of the Hemsworth Rural District, before its abolishment in 1974, when it became part of the Wakefield Metropolitan District. The parish was part of the Ackworth, North Elmsall and Upton ward, currently represented on the Wakefield Metropolitan District Council by three members of the Labour Party.

In 1866 North Elmsall became a separate civil parish, on 1 April 2023 the parish was abolished to form "Upton and North Elmsall" and Wentbridge, part also went South Elmsall.

== Village ==
The average house price in the parish is £236,058, and the majority of houses in the area are detached or semi-detached. Few amenities exist in the village apart from the church, but North Emsall's proximity to Upton and South Elmsall mean that services are just a short journey away. The village used to have a railway station on the Hull and Barnsley Railway line, but this closed to passengers in 1932. Now, the nearest railway station is in South Elmsall, although the parish lies near to the A638, providing easy access to Wakefield, and the A628 to Barnsley.

== Occupational history ==
Charts showing the changes in employment sectors in North Elmsall between 1881 and 2011

In 1881, the main employment sector was agriculture, providing jobs for 53 people, 51 of whom where men. The other main type of employment at the time was domestic service, in which 22 females and 9 males were recorded to work in when the 1881 census took place. This is a typical employment structure of the time, with more men doing manual labour while women were expected to stay in the house.

From 1927, North Elmsall and nearby Upton were mining communities. The colliery closed in 1964, after numerous accidents lead to the loss of 61 lives during the 40 years it was open, as well as geological faults.

The 2011 census shows that the key areas of employment in the parish greatly differ from those of the 1881 census. Only 13 people are now employed in agriculture, despite the parish experiencing a large population growth and being located in a fairly rural area. This is likely due to the mechanisation of agricultural work, with has led to reduced dependency on manual labour, as well as improved education since the 1881 census, allowing more people to access different career paths. The main industry is now wholesale and retail trade, and many others are employed in construction and manufacturing, amongst other areas.

== Population history ==
Population of North Elmsall, 1881 to 2011

Census data between 1881 and 1921 shows that there were no major changes in population in the parish, with the population steadily growing from 287 in 1881 to only 462 in 1921. However, over the next ten years, the population grew rapidly, with the 1931 census listing the population as 2,368. This could be attributed to the opening of the nearby Upton Colliery, which, at the time, provided jobs for many people, attractive more people to the area.

The population dropped in the 1961 census, which can again be linked to the local colliery, which closed around this time, forcing people to move away to find new employment. The population was recorded in the 2011 census as 3,873.

== See also ==
- Listed buildings in North Elmsall
