= Upton, West Yorkshire =

Village and civil parish in West Yorkshire, England

Coordinates: 53.620°N 1.290°W

Upton
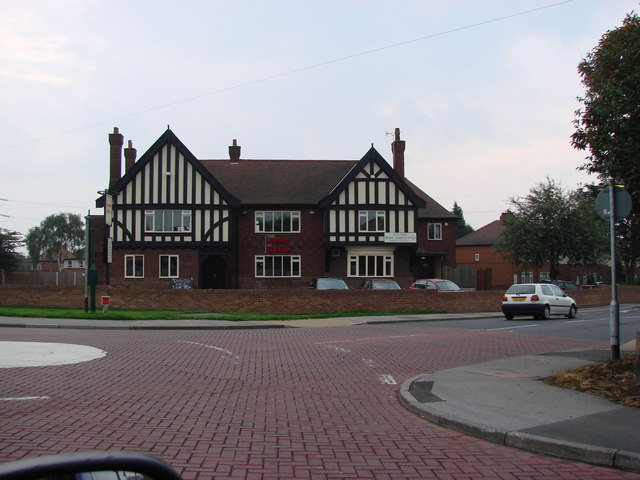
- The Upton Arms

- Location within West Yorkshire
- Population: 3,541 (2001 census)
- OS grid reference: SE470134
- Civil parish: Upton and North Elmsall
- Metropolitan borough: City of Wakefield
- Metropolitan county: West Yorkshire
- Region: Yorkshire and the Humber
- Country: England
- Sovereign state: United Kingdom
- Post town: PONTEFRACT
- Postcode district: WF9
- Police: West Yorkshire
- Fire: West Yorkshire
- Ambulance: Yorkshire
- UK Parliament: Normanton and Hemsworth

Upton is a village in the civil parish of Upton and North Elmsall, in the City of Wakefield, West Yorkshire, England. The parish had a population of 3,541 in the 2001 census.

It is situated south of Badsworth and north of North Elmsall and is part of the SESKU (South Elmsall, South Kirkby, Upton) area. The village is also in the WF9 postal area (Pontefract) and very close to the South Yorkshire boundary. Until 1974 it was in the West Riding of Yorkshire.

== History ==
The village is mentioned in the Domesday Book, where it is noted as having a church. The name literally means Higher Town and is recorded as Uptune, Uptone and Opton in old documents. Historically, the village was in the wapentake of Osgoldcross. Upton was formerly a township in the parish of Badsworth, in 1866 Upton became a separate civil parish, on 1 April 2023 the parish was abolished to form "Upton and North Elmsall".

In 1885, the Hull and Barnsley Railway opened a railway station at the south end of the village, which also served the community of North Elmsall. In 1924, Upton Colliery was opened to the south east of the village, but was closed in 1964 due to geological faulting and a serious explosion which required the shafts to be sealed.

A former coal mining community, regeneration is in progress as a housing overflow for the more expensive areas of Doncaster and Pontefract.

== Sport ==
The village was home to Upton Colliery F.C. who appeared in the FA Cup and featured Charlie Williams as a player.

A short-lived greyhound racing track was opened near the village by the Carters' Knottingley Brewery Co Ltd. The racing was independent (not affiliated to the sports governing body, the National Greyhound Racing Club) and was thus known as a "flapping track", which was the nickname given to independent tracks. The lease was granted in 1933 to the tenant of the Greenfield Hotel, who wanted to attract the local mining community. The Greenfield Hotel and track are believed to have closed during World War II, with the six-acre site being made available for housing in 1947. The Carters' Knottingley Brewery Co Ltd also leased out greyhound tracks at Great Houghton and Pontefract.

== Notable people ==
Recent recognised villagers include playwright John Godber, and Ada Mason (formerly the oldest living woman in England).

== See also ==
- Listed buildings in Upton, West Yorkshire
