= Moorthorpe =

Village in West Yorkshire, England

Coordinates: 53.5949°N 1.3050°W

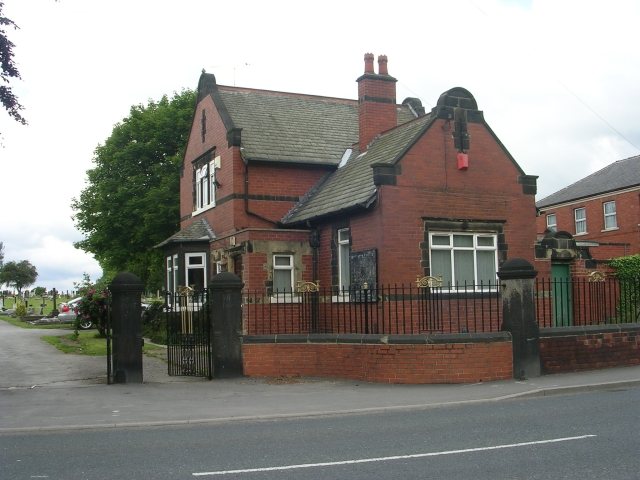
- Moorthorpe Cemetery Lodge

- Location within West Yorkshire
- OS grid reference: SE4630611071
- Civil parish: South Kirkby and Moorthorpe
- Metropolitan borough: City of Wakefield
- Metropolitan county: West Yorkshire
- Region: Yorkshire and the Humber
- Country: England
- Sovereign state: United Kingdom
- Post town: PONTEFRACT
- Postcode district: WF9
- Dialling code: 01977
- Police: West Yorkshire
- Fire: West Yorkshire
- Ambulance: Yorkshire
- UK Parliament: Hemsworth

Moorthorpe is a village in the civil parish of South Kirkby and Moorthorpe in the City of Wakefield district of West Yorkshire, England. It is governed by South Kirkby and Moorthorpe Town Council.

== Meaning of the name 'Moorthorpe' ==
Moorthorpe literally means 'farm on the moor' and has its base in Old Norse.

== History ==
The earliest written account of Moorthorpe is in the Domesday Book of 1086, when Moorthorpe is mentioned as part of the manor of South Kirkby. However, there is known evidence of Iron Age and Roman occupation and activity in the surrounding countryside and it is known that Sweinn and Arnketill, two Anglo-Saxon noblemen held the manor prior to the Norman Conquest. After the Conquest William gave the manor to Ilbert de Lacy.

Whilst there are no medieval maps of the village in known existence the earliest maps appear to show that Barnsley Road (known then as Mellwood Road) was the only or main route through what would have remained a sparsely occupied farming hamlet. Langthwaite House, situated alongside what is now known locally as the "library field" was flanked by Langthwaite Beck, where an ancient well and natural spring were found.

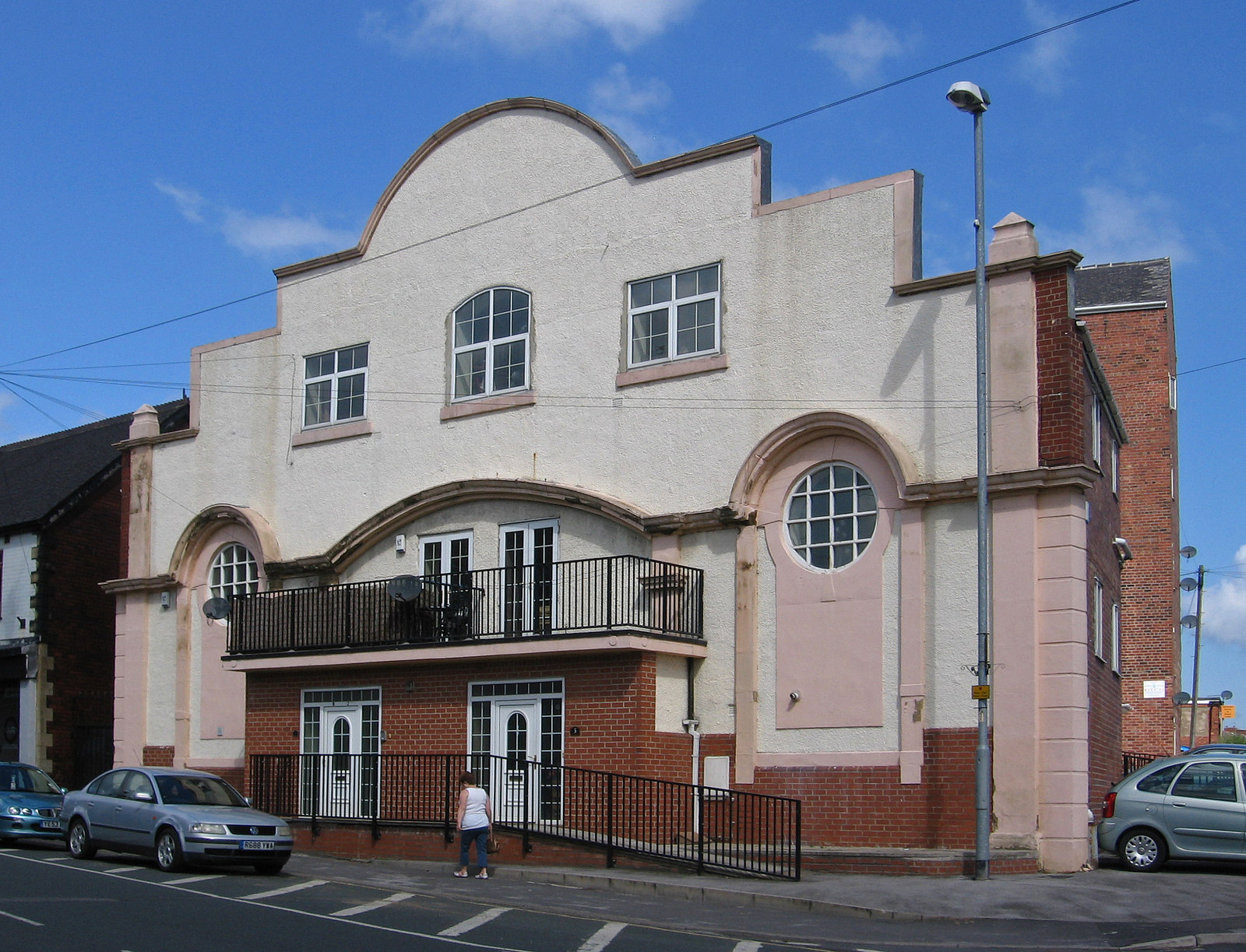
The former Empire Theatre

The industrial revolution brought the railways and coal mining to the area and along with it a need for housing and recreation. On Barnsley Road there were a number of shops and the Empire Theatre, which is now an apartment block, though it does retain some of its obvious features externally. The Moorthorpe Picture Palace was located nearby but has been demolished. Also in the village was the miners institute building, although it is now privately owned and its elaborate carved entrance featuring a miner at work has been obscured.

== Today ==
With the closure of the collieries the village has seen a number of changes to its buildings. The former police station on Barnsley Road is now flats as is the old Post Office house.

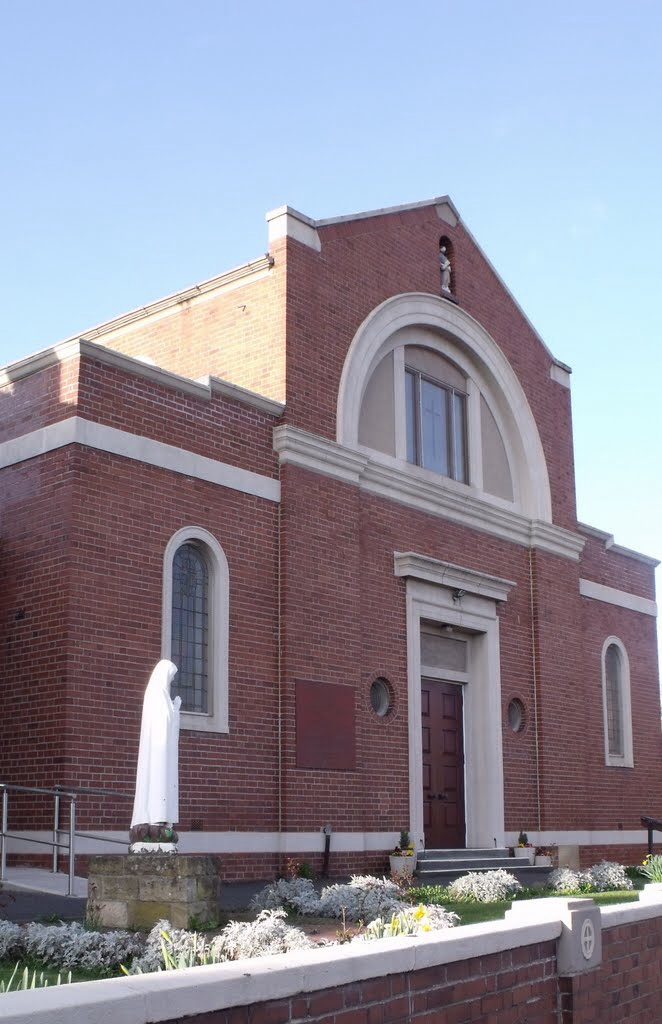
St Joseph's Church

The shops on Barnsley Road remain, although fewer in number and Asda now have a supermarket on the same road.

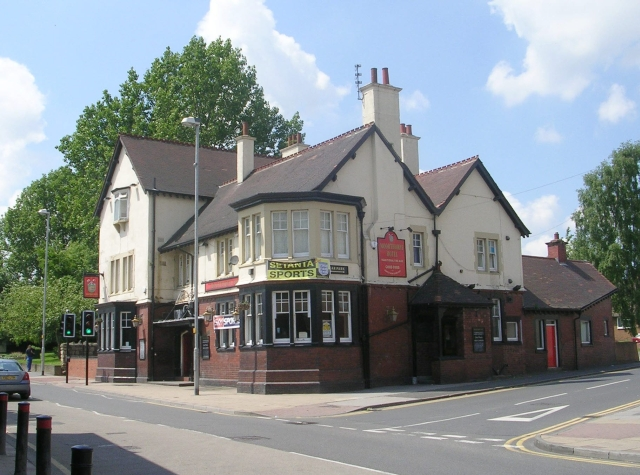
Moorthorpe Hotel

There are four public houses in the village, however the Moorthorpe Hotel has not been open for a while and has been threatened with demolition. The Empire WMC was a central location in the 1984–85 miners strike.

There are two schools in Moorthorpe, St Joseph's Roman Catholic Primary and Moorthorpe Primary School. Day care and nursery is also available at St Peter and Paul's Hall.

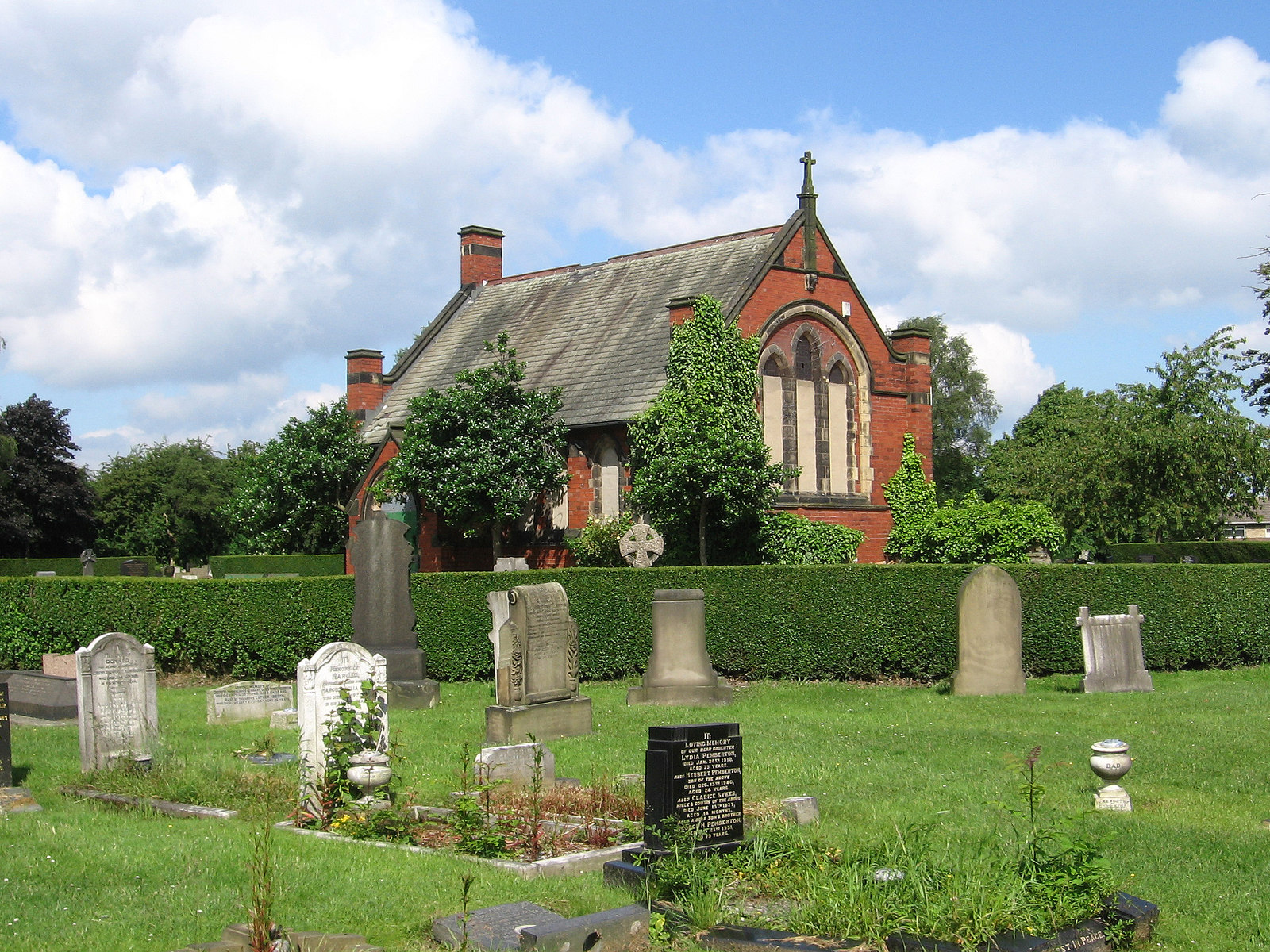
Moorthorpe Cemetery and the small chapel

St Joseph's Roman Catholic Church stands at the heart of the village. Opened in 1928 it is a beautiful example of a red brick church and it was restored in the mid- to late 1990s.

Moorthorpe Cemetery sits alongside the church, with many elaborate monuments and paved walkways. The cemetery is surrounded by high walls with decorative iron railings.

The Mallard Cafe is situated in the restored station house at Moorthorpe railway station.

== Architecture ==
The majority of buildings in the village date from the late 19th and early 20th century and were built to accommodate the large number of employees at the local collieries. Due to this many of the buildings are grand, red brick structures with ornamental brick or stone flourishes, reflecting the new opulence of the village.

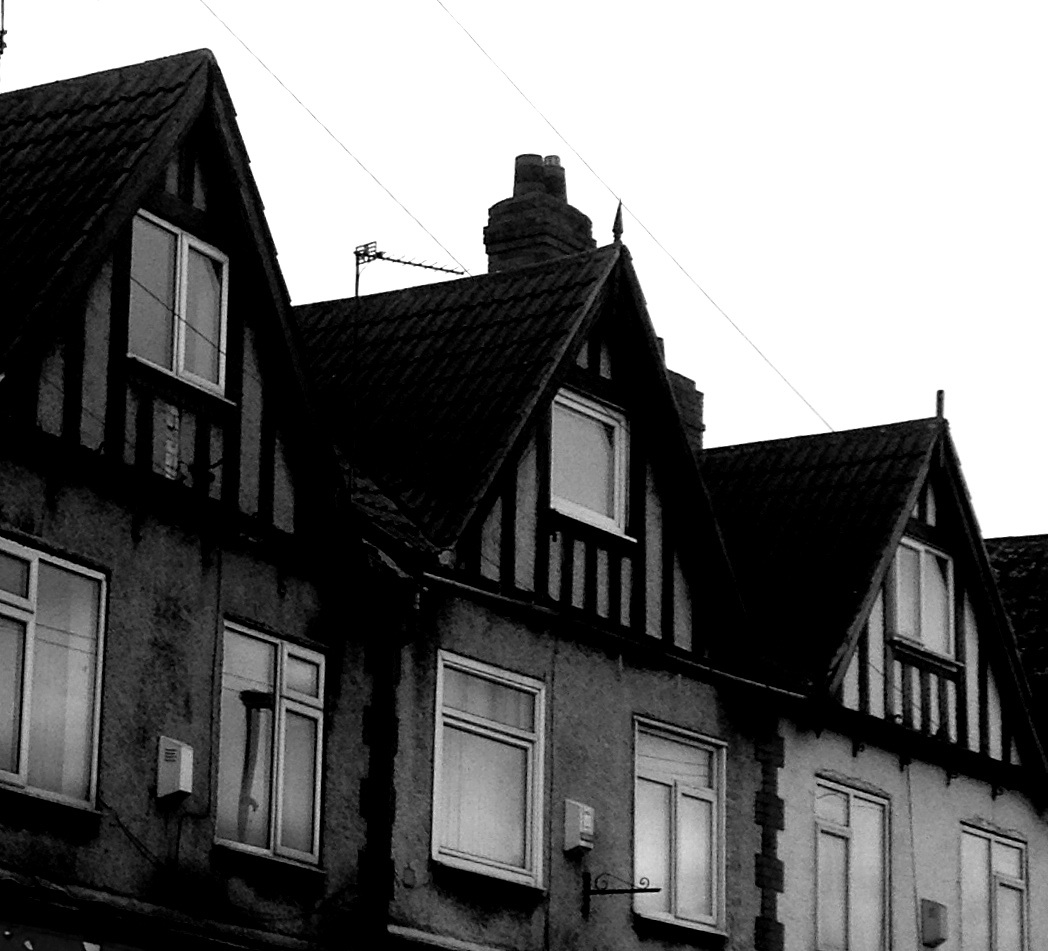
Faux Tudor timber framed frontage on early 20th century buildings, Barnsley Road

A large proportion of the houses are traditional workers terrace houses and whilst the trend for modern reconstruction has hidden a large part of the architectural style of the housing stock there is evidence of a continuation of the Victorian revival of older styles, albeit on a less grand scale. For example, on the former main shopping street of Barnsley Road there is still some evidence of faux half-timbering, with a mock Tudor style facade still existing on the top half of a small number of buildings.

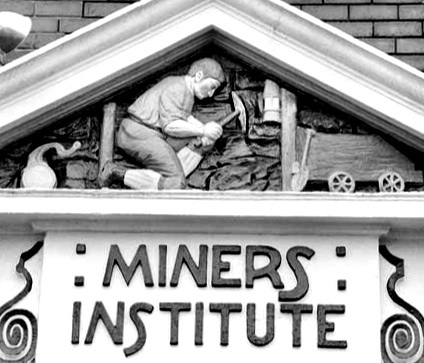
The elaborate gable at the former miners institute building

Some of the grander buildings shared a similar appearance, for example the former Empire Theatre, former Palace Picture house and St Joseph's Church featured the use of stylised circular windows and circular flourishes to the top of the front of their facades.

Other buildings, such as the miners institute building and the Empire WMC have gables, which are far more grand than would be expected in a small village. The miner's institute was host to a number of key events locally, including visits to the area by key suffragettes, the Lansbury family, and Sinn Fein.

== Governance ==
=== Town council ===
The village is governed locally by South Kirkby and Moorthorpe Town Council. Despite the fact that the local council has a range of powers, such as the ability to raise funds through taxes (the precept), it is currently an unelected body, with all Councillors selected internally by the local council without a contest at elections. This is unlike most of the neighbouring town and parish councils, including South Elmsall, whose Councillors are elected directly by way of a public vote.

Moorthorpe Councillors (elected without a contest)
Party	Candidate	Votes	%	±%
Independent	Harold Mills	0	0	0
Labour	Jacqueline Cole	0	0	0
Labour	Marjarie Burkinshaw	0	0	0
Labour	Joyce Tunstall	0	0	0
Labour	Diane Lancaster	0	0	0
Majority		0	0	0
Turnout		0	0	0

=== South Elmsall and South Kirkby Ward ===
Moorthorpe forms part of the South Elmsall and South Kirkby ward, a ward of the metropolitan borough of the City of Wakefield and which forms part of the governing Wakefield Metropolitan District Council. The representatives of the ward are elected by way of a public vote, the last election was held in 2014.

South Elmsall and South Kirkby
Party	Candidate	Votes	%	±%
Independent	Wilf Benson	1802	51.0	+12.4
Labour	Laurie Harrison	1471	41.6	−14.5
Conservative	Christian I'Anson	263	7.4	+2.1
Majority		331	9.4	−8.1
Turnout		3536	26.8	−0.6
Independent gain from Labour		Swing		

=== Member of Parliament ===
Nationally the village is served by Jon Trickett, the Labour MP for the Hemsworth constituency, who has his offices in the village. Gabriel Price was formerly the elected Member of Parliament for the area, who had close ties to Moorthorpe.

== Transport ==
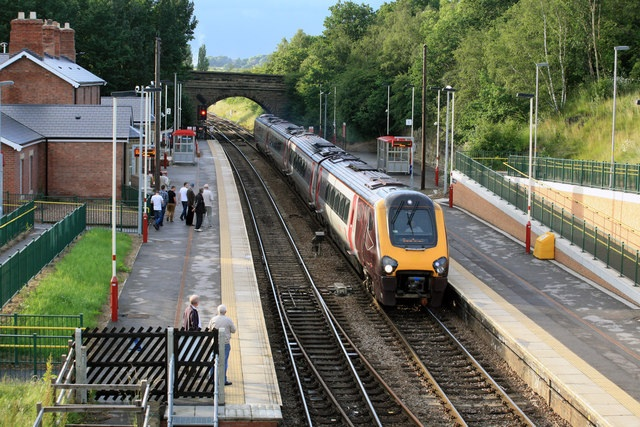
Moorthorpe railway station

The village is served by Moorthorpe railway station, which had its station building fully restored in 2010 and which provides regular services to Leeds, Wakefield, Sheffield and York.

The main station building hosts a waiting room, the Mallard Cafe, the offices of Jon Trickett MP and a number of other office spaces.

== Sport ==
There is a long history of junior football in the village, with Empire Colts and Moorthorpe Rangers football clubs. However, in 2013 Moorthorpe Rangers moved to South Elmsall to become part of the Frickley Athletic Academy, ending a long association with Moorthorpe.

== Notable people ==
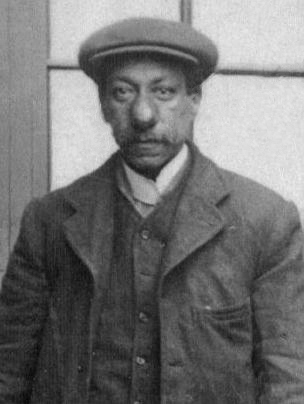
Moorthorpe resident Arthur Wharton

- Arthur Wharton, the world's first black professional footballer, lived in Moorthorpe.
- Arthur Barraclough, who played for Chelsea and Swindon Town and who played in the Football League was born in Moorthorpe and his parents ran the miners institute.
- Dick Hewitt was born in Moorthorpe and played in the Football League. His former clubs include Huddersfield Town, Barnsley and York City.

== Twin towns ==
Moorthorpe is twinned with South Kirkby, which is the town to the west of Moorthorpe.

== See also ==
- Listed buildings in South Kirkby and Moorthorpe
