= Normanton and Hemsworth =

UK Parliament constituency (since 2024)

Coordinates: 53.65°N 1.38°W

- County constituency for the House of Commons
- Boundaries since 2024
- Boundary of Normanton and Hemsworth in Yorkshire and the Humber
- County: West Yorkshire
- Electorate: 75,645
- Major settlements: Featherstone; Normanton; Hemsworth

Current constituency
- Created: 2024
- Member of Parliament: Jon Trickett (Labour)
- Seats: One
- Created from: Hemsworth; Normanton, Pontefract and Castleford (minor part)

Normanton and Hemsworth is a constituency of the House of Commons in the UK Parliament. Created as a result of the 2023 Periodic Review of Westminster constituencies, it was first contested at the 2024 general election. It is currently represented by Jon Trickett of the Labour Party, who previously represented the predecessor constituency of Hemsworth from 1996 to 2024.

== Constituency profile ==
Normanton and Hemsworth is a constituency in West Yorkshire, covering the towns, villages and rural areas east of the city of Wakefield. It is named after its largest town, Normanton (not including Altofts), which has a population of around 17,000, and the smaller town of Hemsworth. Other settlements include the towns of Featherstone, South Kirkby and South Elmsall and the villages of Fitzwilliam, Kinsley, Havercroft, Ryhill, Crofton, Walton, Ackworth and Upton.

This constituency's economy was traditionally dominated by the coal mining industry. Normanton was also a significant railway hub for transporting the area's coal production. This industry was phased out in the late 20th century, and today most of the constituency is highly-deprived, although Walton and Ackworth are more affluent. House prices across the constituency are generally lower than the rest of Yorkshire and the average price is around half the national average.

The age profile of the constituency's residents is similar to the rest of the country, but with a lower proportion of young adults. In general, residents have low levels of education and average rates of homeownership. Household income is low but the child poverty rate is average. A high proportion of residents work in the transport and manufacturing sectors. A low proportion work in professional occupations, but the percentage claiming unemployment benefits is below average. White people made up 97% of the population at the 2021 census.

At the local council, all seats in the constituency are represented by Reform UK councillors. Voters in the constituency very strongly supported leaving the European Union in the 2016 referendum; an estimated 69% voted in favour of Brexit compared to the UK-wide figure of 52%, giving Normanton and Hemsworth one of the top 30 highest Leave-voting rates out of 650 UK constituencies.

== History ==
The constituency was formed primarily from the existing Hemsworth constituency - excluding the Wakefield South ward, with the addition of Normanton from Normanton, Pontefract and Castleford (renamed Pontefract, Castleford and Knottingley).

== Boundaries ==
The constituency comprises the following wards of the City of Wakefield (as they existed on 1 December 2020):

- Ackworth, North Elmsall and Upton
- Crofton, Ryhill and Walton
- Featherstone
- Hemsworth
- Normanton
- South Elmsall and South Kirkby

== Members of Parliament ==
Election	Member	Party
2024	Jon Trickett	Labour

== Elections ==
=== Elections in the 2020s ===
General election 2024: Normanton and Hemsworth
Party	Candidate	Votes	%	±%
Labour	Jon Trickett	17,275	47.5	+7.9
Reform	Callum Bushrod	10,613	29.2	+14.0
Conservative	Alice Mae Hopkin	4,995	13.7	−17.7
Green	Ashton Howick	2,147	5.9	+4.1
Liberal Democrats	Craig Dobson	1,319	3.6	−0.6
Majority		6,662	18.3	+10.2
Turnout		36,349	48.1	−9.4
Registered electors		75,645		
Labour hold		Swing	−3.1	

=== Elections in the 2010s ===
2019 notional result
Party	Vote	%
Labour	17,152	39.6
Conservative	13,632	31.4
Brexit Party	6,609	15.2
Others	3,196	7.8
Liberal Democrats	1,831	4.2
Green	782	1.8
Turnout	43,367	57.5
Electorate	75,388	

== See also ==
- List of parliamentary constituencies in West Yorkshire
- List of parliamentary constituencies in the Yorkshire and the Humber (region)
