= Daniel Egbunike =

English boxer

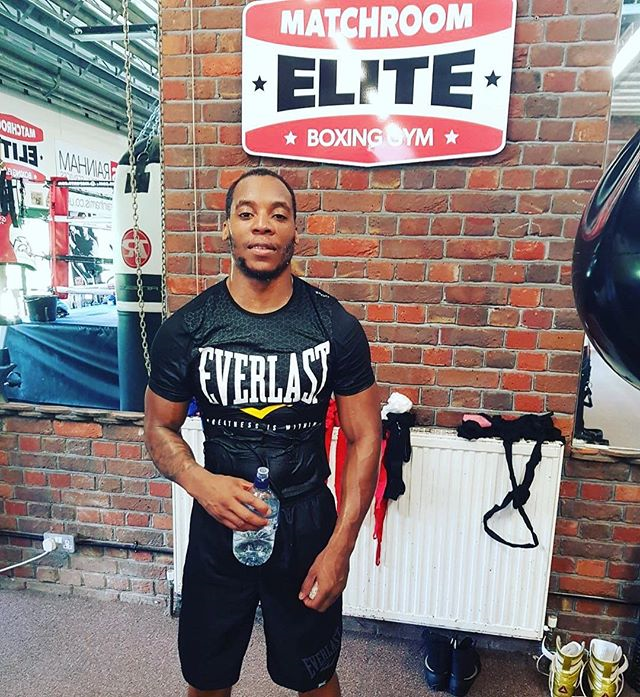
- Egbunike at Matchroom Boxing Gym in 2017

Personal information
- Nickname: Danny Darko
- Nationality: British
- Born: 25 October 1989 (age 37) London, England
- Height: 5 ft 7 in (170 cm)
- Weight: Light-welterweight

Boxing career
- Stance: Orthodox

Boxing record
- Total fights: 7
- Wins: 6
- Win by KO: 3
- Losses: 1

Daniel Egbunike (born 25 October 1989) is a British professional boxer.

== Amateur career ==
Egbunike started boxing aged 23 at his local boxing gym for two years before going on to win the ABA Championships. Egbunike won both the novice and elite ABA titles.

== Professional career ==
Egbunike made his professional debut against Alec Bazza on 7 October 2017 at the Brentwood Centre in Essex, scoring a second-round technical knockout (TKO).

On 28 June 2019 he faced fellow unbeaten prospect Martin McDonagh in a Southern Area title eliminator at the York Hall in London. Egbunike won via points decision (PTS) over ten rounds, setting up a shot at the Southern Area title. On 9 November he outpointed the previously unbeaten Billy Allington over ten rounds at the York Hall, capturing the Southern Area super-lightweight title in the fewest fights to date – winning the title in just his sixth professional bout.

== Personal life ==
Before boxing, Egbunike served time in prison on two occasions for dealing drugs, serving a total of two years and nine months for both offences.

== Professional boxing record ==
7 fights	6 wins	1 loss
By knockout	3	0
By decision	3	1

No.	Result	Record	Opponent	Type	Round, time	Date	Location	Notes
7	Loss	6–1	(United Kingdom) Harlem Eubank	PTS	10	2 Dec 2020	(United Kingdom) Production Park Studios, South Kirkby, England	
6	Win	6–0	(United Kingdom) Billy Allington	PTS	10	9 Nov 2019	(United Kingdom) York Hall, London, England	Won vacant Southern Area super-lightweight title
5	Win	5–0	(United Kingdom) Martin McDonagh	PTS	10	28 Jun 2019	(United Kingdom) York Hall, London, England	
4	Win	4–0	(Hungary) Janos Andras Vass	KO	2 (6)	9 Mar 2019	(United Kingdom) Brentwood Centre, Brentwood, England	
3	Win	3–0	(Slovenia) Ivan Godor	PTS	6	2 Apr 2018	(United Kingdom) York Hall, London, England	
2	Win	2–0	(Spain) Israel Munoz	TKO	1 (4)	2 Dec 2017	(United Kingdom) Brentwood Centre, Brentwood, England	
1	Win	1–0	(United Kingdom) Alec Bazza	TKO	2 (4)	7 Oct 2017	(United Kingdom) Brentwood Centre, Brentwood, England	
