= Great Houghton Greyhound Track =

Greyhound racing track

- Location: High Street, Great Houghton, South Yorkshire
- Coordinates: 53°33′10″N 1°21′03″W
- Opened: 1935
- Closed: 1954

Great Houghton Greyhound Track was a greyhound racing track located on High Street, Great Houghton, South Yorkshire.

== Origins ==
Thomas Jeffries Sides, the Mayor of Pontefract and Managing Director of the Pontefract Park Race Company and the Carters Knottingley Brewery Co Ltd allowed the construction of a second greyhound track on land owned by company; the first was in Upton, West Yorkshire. A third track (Pontefract Greyhound Stadium) was also owned by the company which was run by W. J. Wilby following the death of Sides in 1938.

== Greyhound racing ==
The track was adjacent to the Old Hall Inn and was leased and opened by Mr J Button in 1935. The racing was independent (not affiliated to the sports governing body the National Greyhound Racing Club).

Following the death of Mr. Button in February 1941, the company bought the Old Hall Inn and found a new tenant Mr H.O.Butterfield. The site was valued in 1950 at £350, much less than sister track Pontefract. Mr. M.T. Armin took over in 1953, paying £200 for the fixtures and fittings and a lease of £25 per year.

== Closure ==
Due to falling attendances racing stopped in June 1954 and the field was incorporated into the tenancy of the inn.
