= South Kirkby Football League =

- Founded: 1930
- Folded: 1940
- Region: England South Kirkby, West Yorkshire
- Most championships: South Kirkby Common Road (4)

The South Kirkby Football League was an amateur, English association football league based in South Kirkby, West Yorkshire, and surrounding area.

== History ==
The league was founded in July 1930, with an initial 32 football clubs applying to join. It was decided at the first meeting of the league that there would be two cup competitions alongside the league championship, the Frickley Hospital Cup and Hemsworth Hospital Cup. The league was initially affiliated to the Doncaster Football Association. By 1933 the number of clubs had begun to dwindle, reaching a low of just six teams, though an appeal to local junior football clubs to join the league proved successful.

In 1932 Upton Colliery, who were competing in the league, signed wingers Bennett and Wilkes formerly of Leeds United and Sunderland and in 1933 moved to the Yorkshire League.

By 1937 the league secretary Mr T. Froud noted that he felt it unfair that the team which finished the league with the most points but lost the final were not rewarded for their success. In an attempt to revive interest in the league Frickley Colliery offered a to help raise funds for a trophy for the league leaders by playing a league representative side.

In 1940 the league explored the concept of introducing a handicap system where the champions would start the league with zero points and teams who finished lower would have a points start, the concept was dismissed out of hand by the Sheffield and Hallamshire Football Association as being contrary to the laws of the game.

The league appears to have disbanded due to the outbreak of war, or at the very least no records appear to exist beyond December of the 1939–40 season.

== Champions ==
The first league champions were Hemsworth Victoria Rovers, who scored 129 goals in their 26 league matches of the 1930–31 season. Skellow Athletic were the 1931–32 league champions. South Kirkby Common Road won the 1932–33 title, beating off opposition from South Kirkby Wednesday. Carr Lane Victoria were the 1933–34 champions

In the 1934–35 season Carr Lane Rovers, who had changed their name to South Kirkby King's Own Yorkshire Light Infantry, led the league for much of the season and won the league easily. The following season they reverted to their old name of Carr Lane Rovers. South Kirkby Common Road won the title in successive seasons between 1935–36, 1936–37 and 1937–38.

Upton Brookside won the 1938–39 title. No results appear to exist beyond December 1939, so no league champion for the 1939–40 season is currently known.

Season	
1930–31	Hemsworth Victoria Rovers
1931–32	Skellow Athletic
1932–33	South Kirkby Common Road
1933–34	Carr Lane Victoria
1934–35	Carr Lane Rovers
1935–36	South Kirkby Common Road
1936–37	South Kirkby Common Road
1937–38	South Kirkby Common Road
1938–39	Upton Brookside

== Cup competitions ==
Alongside the league competition the South Kirkby Football League also initially ran the Hemsworth Hospital Cup and the Frickley Hospital Cup. However, prior to the inception of the league in 1930 there was an already established association football competition in the area known as the Hemsworth Hospital Cup, at least as early as 1921. Few results from this cup competition appear to have survived, though it is known that Hemsworth West End beat South Kirkby in the 1924–25 cup final. It appears unlikely that this earlier competition is the same one run as part of the later South Kirkby Football League. No information regarding the Frickley Hospital Cup appears to survive beyond the initial proposal when the league was formed in 1930. Neither competition appears to have been long lived, if ever undertaken at all.
