= Listed buildings in South Kirkby and Moorthorpe =

South Kirkby and Moorthorpe is a civil parish in the metropolitan borough of the City of Wakefield, West Yorkshire, England. The parish contains eight listed buildings that are recorded in the National Heritage List for England. Of these, one is listed at Grade I, the highest of the three grades, and the others are at Grade II, the lowest grade. The parish contains the town of South Kirkby and the village of Moorthorpe and the surrounding countryside. Most of the listed buildings are farmhouses, houses and farm buildings, and the other listed building is a church.

== Key ==
Grade	Criteria
I	Particularly important buildings of more than special interest
II	Buildings of national importance and special interest

== Buildings ==
Name and location	Photograph	Date	Notes	Grade
All Saints' Church; 53.59429°N 1.31714°W		13th century	The church, which was later extended and altered, is in magnesian limestone with lead-clad roofs. It consists of a nave, north and south aisles, a south porch, a chancel with north and south chapels, and a west tower. The tower has four stages, diagonal buttresses with crocketed finials, a west doorway and a west window, clock faces in the north and south sides, and tall bell windows, above which are gargoyles, and an embattled parapet with crocketed pinnacles on the corners and in the centres. The south porch has gargoyles and pinnacles, shields with the coats of arms of local families, a niche containing a statue with an ogee canopy and a crocketed pinnacle, and a parapet with ridged coping.	I
Barn, Ball Park Farm; 53.59291°N 1.32796°W	—	Late 17th or early 18th century	The barn is in sandstone with some brick patching and a corrugated sheet roof. There are five bays and a rectangular plan. On the west front are a central square-headed cart entry, double doors, two pitching holes, and slit vents.	II
Kirkby Common Farmhouse; 53.58719°N 1.34288°W	—	Early to mid 18th century	The farmhouse is in sandstone, rendered on the ground floor and right return, and has a slate roof with coped gables and shaped kneelers. There are three storeys at the front and two at the rear under a catslide roof, and a symmetrical front of two bays. The central doorway has long-and-short jamb stones and a fluted keystone. The windows in the lower two floors are inserted casements, and in the top floor are horizontally-sliding sashes.	II
Stockingate Farmhouse; 53.58999°N 1.32135°W	—	Early to mid 18th century	A farmhouse, later a private house, in sandstone, with quoins, and a slate roof with coped gables and kneelers. There are three storeys and an L-shaped plan, consisting of a main block with a symmetrical front of two bays, and a rear outshut. The central doorway has a plain surround, it is flanked by French windows, and most of the other windows are horizontally-sliding sashes.	II
Arden Farmhouse; 53.59232°N 1.32918°W	—	1755	A farmhouse, later a private house, in sandstone, with a roof of pantiles on the main house, and stone slate on the rear wing. The main range has two storeys and an attic and three bays, and the rear wing is lower with two storeys, and a workshop at the rear. The central doorway has a triple keystone, the centre fluted, above it is a datestone and single-light window, and in the outer bays are casement windows.	II
Coach house and dovecote, Hague Hall Farm; 53.60211°N 1.33667°W	—	Late 18th century	The coach house with a dovecote above is in sandstone, with quoins, a band, and a pyramidal stone slate roof. There are three storeys and a single cell. In the west front is a basket-arched wagon doorway, flanked by round-headed niches, and two-light mullioned windows. The south front contain mullioned windows in the lower two floors, and in the top floor is a Diocletian window with a perching sill.	II
1 Green Lane; 53.59221°N 1.32759°W	—	c. 1800	A farmhouse, later a private house, in sandstone, with quoins, and a slate roof with coped gables and kneelers. There are two storeys and a symmetrical front of three bays. The doorway has a Tuscan doorcase and a pediment, and the windows are top-hung casements. At the rear is an inserted doorway and a round-headed stair window.	II
Cart shed and granary, Ball Park Farm; 53.59300°N 1.32835°W	—	Late 18th or early 19th century	The farm building is in sandstone, with a stone slate roof, two storeys and three bays. In the ground is an arcade of three segmental arches on square piers, and above are two square pitching holes. On the left gable end is an external flight of steps to an upper floor doorway.	II
