= Upton and North Elmsall railway station =

Disused railway station in West Yorkshire, England

Upton and North Elmsall
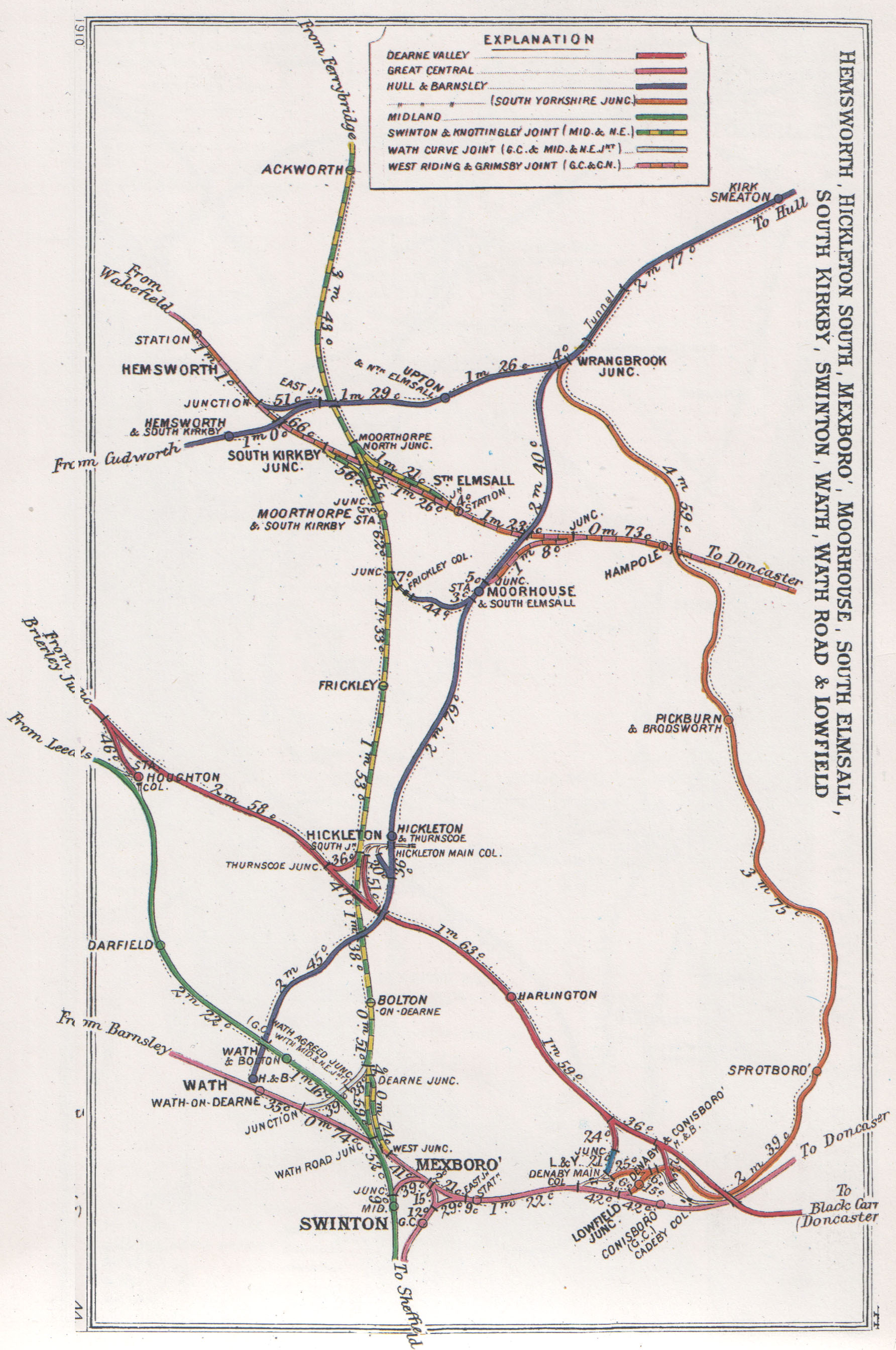
- Upton and North Elmsall station (dark blue line)

General information
- Location: City of Wakefield; England
- Coordinates: 53.611°N 1.286°W
- Grid reference: SE475130
- Platforms: 2

Other information
- Status: Disused

History
- Original company: Hull and Barnsley Railway
- Pre-grouping: North Eastern Railway
- Post-grouping: London and North Eastern Railway

Key dates
- 27 July 1885: Station opened
- 1 January 1932: Station closed to passengers
- 1959: Station closed to goods
Location

Upton and North Elmsall railway station, was a railway station on the Hull and Barnsley Railway (H&B) in Yorkshire, England. The station served the villages of Upton and North Elmsall, (both now in the Wakefield District of West Yorkshire). The station closed completely in 1959 and the track was lifted in 1967, however, in 2020, a proposal was forwarded to reinstate over 2 miles (3.2 km) of line for a new heritage railway.

== History ==
Upton and North Elmsall was opened in July 1885 and was closed to passengers in January 1932. The station was 45 miles (72 km) west of Hull Cannon Street, 4 miles (6.4 km) west of Kirk Smeaton railway station and 8 miles (13 km) east of the lines' first terminus at Cudworth.

Passenger services were always limited as the line had been built to exploit the South Yorkshire Coalfield, and export the coal through Hull Docks, but part of the Parliamentary approval for the line was conditional on the company providing a passenger service to the communities that the line went through. Bradshaw's timetable from 1906 has seven workings in each direction daily, whereas by 1922, just two services are shown running between Cudworth and Hull Cannon Street. The station lost its passenger trains when the service from Hull only went as far west as South Howden; all other H&B branches being closed to passengers in January 1932.

Although the station closed to regular passenger traffic in 1932, it was still used for rail tours and special traffic such as football excursions until 1954. Closure of the station to goods came in 1959, but the line from the western portal of Barnsdale Tunnel to Cudworth, remained open for colliery traffic until 7 August 1967. The old trackbed in the area is now part of Upton Country Park.

In 1996, a cutting to the east of the station site was designated as a nature reserve.

== Heritage site ==
In June 2020, a proposal was put forward to revamp the site and use it as a heritage railway centre. The proposal also includes laying 2 1/2 miles (4 km) of track through the 1,226-yard (1,121 m) Barnsdale Tunnel and stopping just short of the A1 road at Barnsdale Bar.

Preceding station	Historical railways	Following station
Hemsworth and South Kirkby; Station and line closed	Hull, Barnsley and West Riding Junction Railway; Hull and Barnsley Railway	Kirk Smeaton; Station and line closed
