= Listed buildings in Upton, West Yorkshire =

Upton is a former civil parish in the metropolitan borough of the City of Wakefield, West Yorkshire, England. The parish contained three listed buildings that are recorded in the National Heritage List for England. All the listed buildings are designated at Grade II, the lowest of the three grades, which is applied to "buildings of national importance and special interest". The parish contained the village of Upton and the surrounding countryside. All the listed buildings are in the countryside, and consist of two farmhouses and a lodge.

== Buildings ==
Name and location	Photograph	Date	Notes
Elm Leys Farmhouse; 53.62031°N 1.31533°W	—	Early to mid 18th century	The farmhouse is in sandstone with a stone slate roof. There are two storeys and attics, and an L-shaped plan, consisting of a symmetrical three-bay main range, a lower two-storey single bay to the north, and a rear wing. The central doorway has a plain surround and a fanlight, it is flanked by sash windows, and in the upper floor the windows are casements. Most of the windows in the rear wing are mullioned, and there is a sliding sash window.
Upton Moor Top Farmhouse; 53.61799°N 1.30514°W	—	Mid to late 18th century	A farmhouse, later a private house, in sandstone with quoins and a tile roof with coped gables and kneelers. There are two storeys, a single-depth plan three bays, and rear additions. The doorway has a moulded architrave and a raised keystone, to the left is a canted bay window, and the other windows are sashes.
Lodge to former Elmsall Lodge, gatepiers and railings 53.61694°N 1.30571°W		Early 19th century	The lodge is in sandstone, and has a low-pitched pyramidal slate roof, with oversailing eaves supported by a column and a post. There is a single storey and a T-shaped plan. On the front facing the drive is a canted bay window. There are four square gate piers with panelled sides and wreaths, and iron spear railings.
