= Listed buildings in North Elmsall =

North Elmsall is a former civil parish in the metropolitan borough of the City of Wakefield, West Yorkshire, England. The parish contained eight listed buildings that are recorded in the National Heritage List for England. All the listed buildings are designated at Grade II, the lowest of the three grades, which is applied to "buildings of national importance and special interest". The parish contained the village of North Elmsall and the surrounding countryside. Most of the listed buildings are houses and associated structures, farmhouses and farm buildings, and the others consist of a church and a milepost.

== Buildings ==
Name and location	Photograph	Date	Notes
The Old Hall; 53.61161°N 1.27667°W	—	Early 17th century (or earlier)	Part of a former manor house, it is in magnesian limestone, with roofs partly in pantiles, patched in slate, and partly in stone slate. There are two storeys and an L-shaped plan with two three-bay ranges at right angles. The openings are varied, and include a row of five doorways with cambered heads, two of which have been converted into windows. Some of the other windows are mullioned, others are transomed, and others have been altered.
Barn east of The Old Hall; 53.61174°N 1.27614°W	—	17th century	The barn is in magnesian limestone, with quoins, and a stone slate roof. There is a rectangular plan and four bays, and the barn contains a segmental-arched wagon entry, partly blocked, an inserted wagon entry, and various windows.
Park View and The Cottage; 53.60955°N 1.28050°W	—	c. 1700	A farmhouse and attached cottage in pebbledashed magnesian limestone with a pantile roof and coping at the junction. There are two storeys, the farmhouse has a cellar and two bays, and the cottage has one bay. The doorways have plain surrounds, and the windows are sliding sashes.
North Elmsall Lodge Farmhouse; 53.61513°N 1.31122°W	—	c. 1800	The farmhouse is in stuccoed magnesian limestone, and has a hipped stone slate roof swept over the eaves. There are two storeys and four bays. The doorway has a moulded surround and a fanlight, and the windows are sashes.
Barn northeast of Elmsall Lodge Farmhouse; 53.61503°N 1.31084°W	—	c. 1800	The barn is in sandstone, with quoins, and a pantiled roof with stone slate eaves courses. There is a rectangular plan and five bays. The barn contains a segmental-headed cart entry, slit vents, and boarded hatches.
Coach house east of Elmsall Lodge Farmhouse; 53.61494°N 1.31028°W	—	c. 1800	The former coach house is in sandstone on a plinth, with a floor band, and a roof of corrugated asbestos roof. There are two storeys and eleven bays. The middle five bays project, and contain an arcade of round-headed wagon doorways with keystones and fanlights. The outer bays contain smaller round-headed openings, and in the upper floor are square six-pane windows.
Milepost; 53.60871°N 1.28208°W		Early 19th century	The milepost is in sandstone with cast iron overlay, and has a rectangular section and a rounded top. On the front are the distances to London, and to Doncaster and Wakefield (the last two with just initial letters).
St Margaret's Church; 53.60906°N 1.28095°W		1896–97	The church is in stone on a moulded plinth, with quoins, a moulded eaves cornice, and a tile roof with coped gables, kneelers, and cross finials. The church consists of a nave and a chancel with a canted apse under a single roof, a lean-to baptistry and porch at the west end, a south Lady Chapel, and a north vestry and organ chamber. On the north side is an octagonal bell turret with a spire.
