= Upton Colliery =

Coal mine in West Yorkshire, England

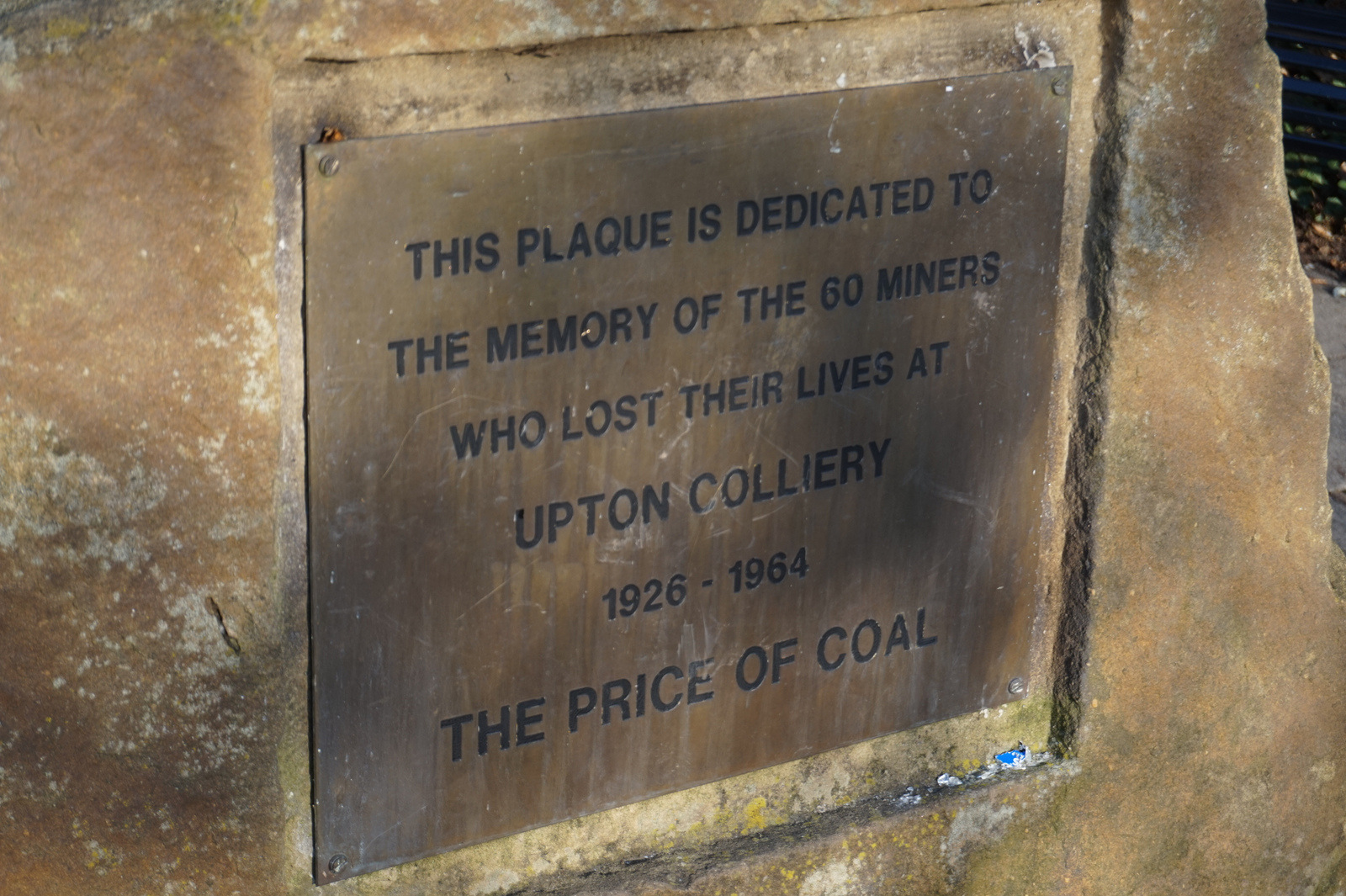
- A memorial plaque to miners of Upton Colliery

- Location within West Yorkshire
- Location: Upton, West Yorkshire, England; 53.614°N 1.273°W
- Products: Coal
- Opened: 1924
- Closed: 1964
- Company: Upton Colliery Company; Dorman Long; National Coal Board

Upton Colliery was a coal mine near to the village of Upton in the West Riding of Yorkshire, England. The site was 8.5 miles (13.7 km) north west of Doncaster and 10 miles (16 km) north east of Barnsley. Coal was transhipped from the colliery by the former Hull and Barnsley Railway line.

The colliery had a short life of only 40 years. Geological faulting and a serious explosion in 1964 led to its closure.

== History ==
Work on the site started in 1924, but preliminary works at the site meant that coal was not raised until 1927. Two shafts were dug throughout 1925 and 1926 to a depth of between 260 yards (240 m) and 300 yards (270 m). By 1927, the seams were located at a depth of 711 yards (650 m), with the coal seam itself extending for 94 feet (29 m). Upton mined mainly from the Barnsley Seam, but also had workings in the Beamshaw and Winter seams. Coal was taken out of the site via the former Hull and Barnsley railway line (which was being run by the London and North Eastern Railway by the time of the colliery's operation).

In 1952, the National Coal Board opened the new £115,000 pit-head baths at the site. The NCB also spent a further £500,000 at Upton in an effort to get the saleable coal output to rise from 24 short hundredweight (2,400 lb; 1,100 kg) per shift to 27 short hundredweight (2,700 lb; 1,200 kg).

The colliery was run by the Upton Colliery Company (Bolckow Vaughan & Co. Ltd and the Cortonwood Co. Ltd) between 1924 and 1939, by Dorman Long between 1939 and 1947, and under the National Coal Board from 1947 to 1964.

The colliery coal tips were cleared in the early 1970s, and the surface area of the coal mine site is now the Upton Country Park. The site now has a pond, a memorial garden and a pit winding wheel sunk into the ground.

== Incidents ==
- 4 June 1940 - an explosion in the Barnsley Seam at the mine killed two men outright, and injured eight others, with one dying in hospital the same night. The other seven casualties all died from extreme burns.
- 20 May 1964 - an explosion in the Barnsley Seam led to an evacuation of the colliery. The area was sealed off which rendered the mine unworkable. Coupled with the bad geology in the seams, the site was closed in November of the same year.

== Notable colliers ==
Charlie Williams worked in the mine during his youth and played for their own team, Upton Colliery F.C. He was scouted by Doncaster Rovers, and post football, was recognised as one of the first black comedians in the United Kingdom.

George Ashall played for Upton F.C. and was a coal-miner before his footballing career.

Joe Shaw worked briefly as a coalminer at Upton and played for Upton Colliery F.C., before moving on to playing football full time with Sheffield United.
