= South Kirkby and Moorthorpe =

Civil parish in West Yorkshire, England

Coordinates: 53.595°N 1.306°W

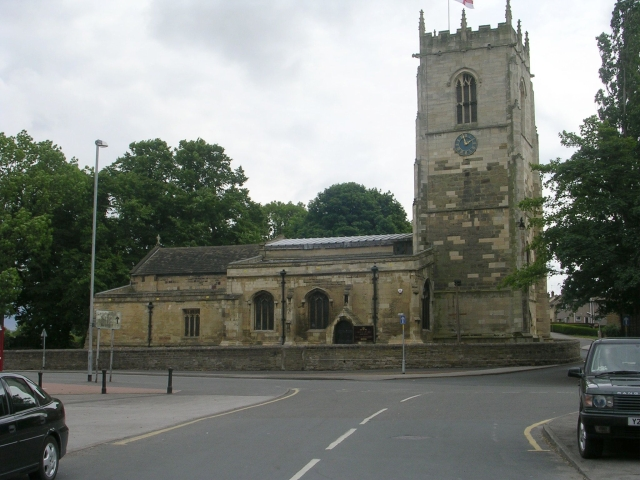
- All Saints Church - South Kirkby

- Location within West Yorkshire
- Population: 11,105 (2011 census)
- Civil parish: South Kirkby and Moorthorpe
- Metropolitan borough: Wakefield
- Metropolitan county: West Yorkshire
- Region: Yorkshire and the Humber
- Country: England
- Sovereign state: United Kingdom
- Police: West Yorkshire
- Fire: West Yorkshire
- Ambulance: Yorkshire

South Kirkby and Moorthorpe is a civil parish in the City of Wakefield in West Yorkshire, England which is governed locally by South Kirkby and Moorthorpe Town Council. The parish and town council are made up of the town of South Kirkby and the village of Moorthorpe. As of 2009 the parish had a population of 10,979, increasing to 11,105 at the 2011 Census.

== See also ==
- Listed buildings in South Kirkby and Moorthorpe
