= Hemsworth and South Kirkby railway station =

Disused railway station in West Yorkshire, England

Coordinates: 53.6044°N 1.3417°W

Hemsworth and South Kirkby

General information
- Location: Hemsworth, West Riding of Yorkshire; South Kirkby, West Riding of Yorkshire; England

Other information
- Status: Disused

History
- Original company: Hull, Barnsley and West Riding Junction Railway and Dock Company
- Pre-grouping: North Eastern Railway
- Post-grouping: London and North Eastern Railway

Key dates
- 1 July 1891: Opened
- 1 January 1932: Closed to regular passenger services
Location

Hemsworth and South Kirkby railway station served the towns of Hemsworth and South Kirkby, in the historical county of West Riding of Yorkshire, England, from 1891 to 1932 on the Hull and Barnsley Railway.

== History ==
The station was opened on 1 July 1891 by the Hull, Barnsley and West Riding Junction Railway and Dock Company. It closed on 1 January 1932 but an excursion ran on 14 October 1933 for Hull Civic Week. This ran every October until 1939.

Preceding station	Disused railways	Following station
Upton and North Elmsall; Line and station closed	Hull, Barnsley and West Riding Junction Railway and Dock Company	Cudworth (NMR platform); Line and station closed
