= Askern Miners F.C. =

Association football club in England

Coordinates: 53.6073°N 1.1597°W

Askern Miners
- Full name: Askern Miners Football Club
- Nickname: The Miners
- Founded: 1924; 102 years ago (as Askern Welfare); 2020 (as Askern Miners FC)
- Ground: The Welfare Ground, Askern
- Capacity: 2,000
- Chairman: Jo North
- League: Doncaster Saturday League Premier Division
- 2024–25: Doncaster Saturday League Premier Division (resigned)
Home colours	Away colours

Askern Miners Football Club is a football club based in Askern, Doncaster, South Yorkshire, England. They are currently members of the Doncaster Saturday League Premier Division.

== History ==
The club was established as Askern Welfare in 1924, playing in local Doncaster leagues for several decades. In 1967 Welfare won the Doncaster & District Senior League title for the only time in the club's history. In 1992 they finished as runners-up and chose to take promotion to the Central Midlands Football League (CMFL), joining the Premier Division. They won promotion to the Supreme Division in 2001, and in 2008 the club won the CMFL Supreme Division title.

Winning the CMFL earned the club promotion to the Northern Counties East League (NCEL), and they changed their name to Askern Villa. In their first NCEL campaign Askern finished third in Division One, just falling short of winning promotion to the Premier Division. They made their FA Vase debut in 2010 and made their one and only appearance in the FA Cup a year later, losing to Thackley in the Extra Preliminary Round.

In 2013 the club finished bottom of the NCEL Division One, conceding a league record 173 goals. They were relegated back to the Central Midlands League and changed their name again, this time to Askern. In their first season back in the CMFL, Askern finished second bottom of the North Division. In 2020, the club was renamed as Askern Miners FC and re-joined the Doncaster Saturday League.

On 13 May 2022, the club announced a merger with then Northern Counties East League Division One side F.C. Humber United, after the latter side were left looking for a new, "permanent home". This decision was reversed, however, on 31 May 2022, after a decision by the FA Leagues Committee that the merger could not go ahead. Askern Miners instead joined the Sheffield & Hallamshire County Senior League.

Askern finished second in their inaugural County Senior League campaign, but withdrew from the competition in the summer of 2023, meaning the club's reserve team would become its first team, playing in the Doncaster League.

=== Season-by-season record ===
Season	Division	Level	Position	FA Cup	FA Vase	Notes
1926–27	Doncaster & District Senior League	–		-	-	
1927–28	Doncaster & District Senior League	–	12th/12	-	-	
1928–29	Doncaster & District Senior League	–		-	-	
1929–30	Doncaster Amateur League	–		-	-	
1930–31	Doncaster & District Senior League	–		-	-	
1931–32	Doncaster Red Triangle League	–	12th/14	-	-	
1932–33	Doncaster Red Triangle League	–		-	-	
1933–34	Doncaster Red Triangle League	–		-	-	
1934–35	Doncaster Red Triangle League	–		-	-	
1935–36	Doncaster Red Triangle League	–		-	-	
1936–37	Doncaster Red Triangle League	–		-	-	
1937–38	Doncaster Red Triangle League	–		-	-	
1938–39	Doncaster Red Triangle League	–		-	-	
1949–50	Doncaster & District Senior League Division 1	–		-	-	
1950–51	Doncaster & District Senior League Division 1	–		-	-	
1951–52	Club did not enter any competitions					
1952–53	Doncaster & District Senior League Division 1	–		-	-	
1953–54	Doncaster & District Senior League Division 1	–		-	-	
1954–55	Doncaster & District Senior League Division 1	–		-	-	
1955–56	Doncaster & District Senior League Division 1	–		-	-	
1956–57	Doncaster & District Senior League Division 1	–		-	-	
1957–58	Doncaster & District Senior League Division 1	–		-	-	
1958–59	Doncaster & District Senior League Division 1	–	3rd/13	-	-	
1959–60	Doncaster & District Senior League Division 1	–	4th/13	-	-	
1960–61	Doncaster & District Senior League Division 1	–	2nd/12	-	-	
1961–62	Doncaster & District Senior League Division 1	–		-	-	
1962–63	Doncaster & District Senior League Division 1	–		–	–	
1963–64	Doncaster & District Senior League Division 1	–	2nd/12	-	-	
1964–65	Doncaster & District Senior League Division 1	–	3rd/12	-	-	
1965–66	Doncaster & District Senior League Premier Division	–	2nd/12	-	-	
1966–67	Doncaster & District Senior League Premier Division	–	1st/15	-	-	League champions
1967–68	Doncaster & District Senior League Premier Division	–		-	-	
1968–69	Doncaster & District Senior League Premier Division	–		-	-	
1969–70	Doncaster & District Senior League Premier Division	–		-	-	
1970–71	Doncaster & District Senior League Premier Division	–		-	-	
1971–72	Doncaster & District Senior League Premier Division	–		-	-	
1972–73	Doncaster & District Senior League Premier Division	–		-	-	
1973–74	Doncaster & District Senior League Premier Division	–		-	-	
1974–75	Doncaster & District Senior League Premier Division	-		-	-	
1975–76	Doncaster & District Senior League Premier Division	–		-	-	
1976–77	Doncaster & District Senior League Premier Division	–		-	-	
1977–78	Doncaster & District Senior League Premier Division	–	11th/14	-	-	
1978–79	Doncaster & District Senior League Premier Division	–		-	-	
1979–80	Doncaster & District Senior League Premier Division	–		-	-	
1980–81	Doncaster & District Senior League Premier Division	–	6th/15	-	-	
1981–82	Doncaster & District Senior League Premier Division	–	7th/14	-	-	
1982–83	Doncaster & District Senior League Premier Division	–	4th/14	-	-	
1983–84	Doncaster & District Senior League Premier Division	–	8th/14	-	-	
1984–85	Doncaster & District Senior League Premier Division	-	2nd/15	-	-	
1985–86	Doncaster & District Senior League Premier Division	–	4th/16	-	-	
1986–87	Doncaster & District Senior League Premier Division	-	12th/14	-	-	
1987–88	Doncaster & District Senior League Premier Division	–	5th/11	-	-	
1988–89	Doncaster & District Senior League Premier Division	–	2nd/13	-	-	
1989–90	Doncaster & District Senior League Premier Division	–	3rd/13	-	-	
1990–91	Doncaster & District Senior League Premier Division	–	2nd/14	-	-	
1991–92	Doncaster & District Senior League Premier Division	–	2nd/13	-	-	
1992–93	Central Midlands League Premier Division	–	9th/19	-	-	
1993–94	Central Midlands League Premier Division	–	5th/15	-	-	
1994–95	Central Midlands League Premier Division	–	9th/17	-	-	
1995–96	Central Midlands League Premier Division	–	8th/18	-	-	
1996–97	Central Midlands League Premier Division	–	8th/18	-	-	
1997–98	Central Midlands League Premier Division	–	4th/17	-	-	
1998–99	Central Midlands League Premier Division	–	9th/15	-	-	
1999–00	Central Midlands League Premier Division	–	7th/16	-	-	
2000–01	Central Midlands League Premier Division	–	4th/17	-	-	Promoted
2001–02	Central Midlands League Supreme Division	–	14th/20	-	-	
2002–03	Central Midlands League Supreme Division	–	17th/20	-	-	
2003–04	Central Midlands League Supreme Division	–	16th/19	-	-	
2004–05	Central Midlands League Supreme Division	11	22nd/22	-	-	Relegated
2005–06	Central Midlands League Premier Division	12	2nd/20	-	-	Promoted
2006–07	Central Midlands League Supreme Division	11	4th/20	-	-	
2007–08	Central Midlands League Supreme Division	11	1st/20	-	-	League champions, promoted
2008–09	Northern Counties East League Division 1	10	3rd/19	-	-	
2009–10	Northern Counties East League Division 1	10	12th/18	-	-	
2010–11	Northern Counties East League Division 1	10	9th/20	-	2QR	
2011–12	Northern Counties East League Division 1	10	17th/22	EPR	3R	
2012–13	Northern Counties East League Division 1	10	22nd/22	-	2QR	Relegated
2013–14	Central Midlands League North Division	11	16th/17	-	1QR	
2014–15	Central Midlands League North Division	11	9th/18	-	-	
2015–16	Central Midlands League North Division	11	6th/15	-	-	
2016–17	Central Midlands League North Division	11	11th/16	-	-	
2017–18	Central Midlands League North Division	11	14th/16	-	-	
2018–19	Central Midlands League North Division	11	13th/14	-	-	
2019–20	Central Midlands League North Division	11	-	-	-	Season abandoned due to COVID-19 pandemic
2020–21	Doncaster Saturday League Premier Division	14	1st/11	-	-	League champions
2021–22	Central Midlands League North Division	11	17th/18	-	-	
2022–23	Sheffield & Hallamshire County Senior League Division Two	13	2nd/13	-	-	
2023–24	Doncaster Saturday League Division One	15	3rd/11	-	-	Promoted
Season	Division	Level	Position	FA Cup	FA Vase	Notes
Source: Football Club History Database

== Ground ==
The club plays at the Welfare Ground, on Doncaster Road, Askern, postcode DN6 0AJ.

=== Gallery ===
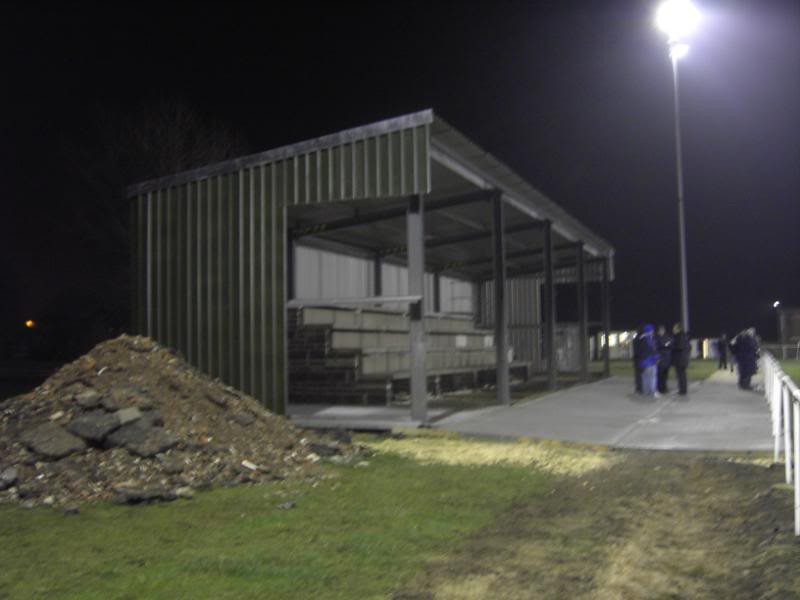
Askern Villa's 96 seat main stand prior to NCEL division one match with AFC Emley. The stand was constructed to enable Askern to stay in the league.

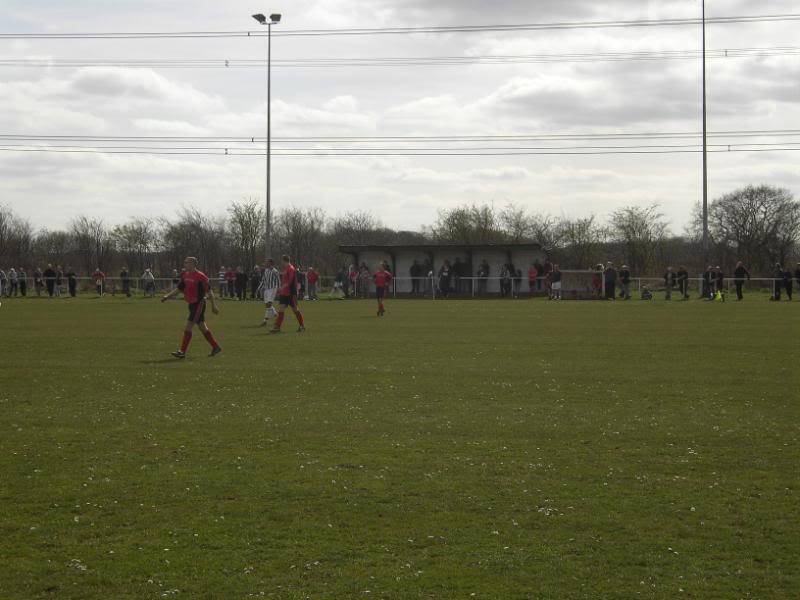
Rose Lane covered stand and home and away dugouts either side.

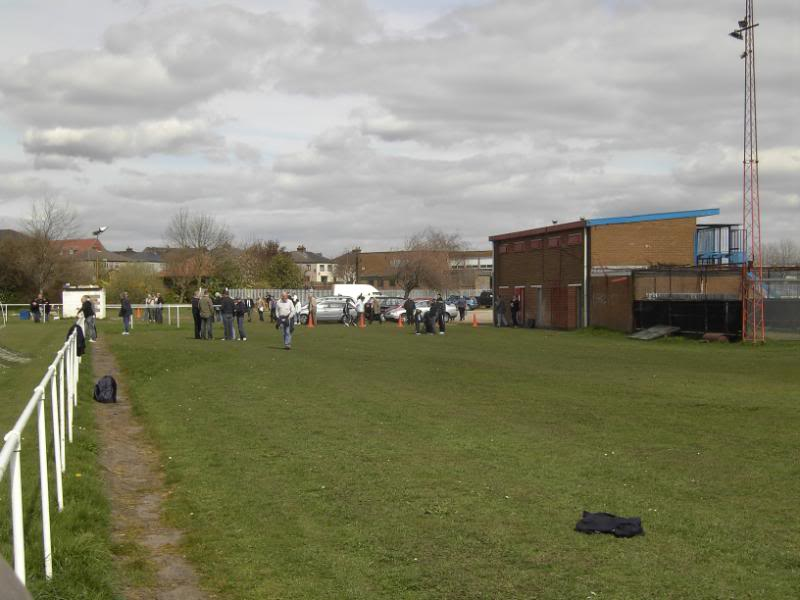
Cricket pitch end and cricket pavilion with changing rooms underneath.

== Honours ==
=== League ===
- Central Midlands League Supreme Division
  - Champions: 2007–08
- Central Midlands League Premier Division
  - Promoted: 2005–06
- Doncaster & District Senior League
  - Champions: 1955–56, 1966–67

=== Cup ===
- Doncaster FA Challenge Cup
  - Winners: 1987–88, 1988–89, 2005–06, 2006–07, 2007–08
- South Elmsall Challenge Cup
  - Winners: 1933–34, 1935–36
  - Runners-up: 1934–35

== Records ==
- Best League performance: 3rd in Northern Counties East League Division One, 2008–09
- Best FA Cup performance: Extra Preliminary Round, 2011–12
- Best FA Vase performance: 3rd Round, 2011–12
- Record attendance: 865 vs. Doncaster Rovers, pre-season friendly, 2010–11
