= Joe Shaw (footballer, born 1928) =

English footballer and manager (1928–2007)

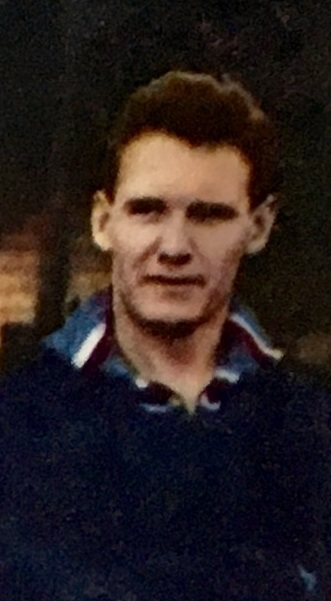
- Shaw lining up for England in 1959

Personal information
- Full name: Joseph Shaw
- Date of birth: 23 June 1928
- Place of birth: Murton, England
- Date of death: 18 November 2007 (aged 79)
- Place of death: Sheffield, England
- Positions: Defender; midfielder

Youth career
- Upton Colliery

Senior career*
Years	Team	Apps	(Gls)
1945–1966	Sheffield United	632	(7)

International career
	Football League XI	2	(?)

Managerial career
- 1967–1968: York City
- 1973–1976: Chesterfield
- * Club domestic league appearances and goals

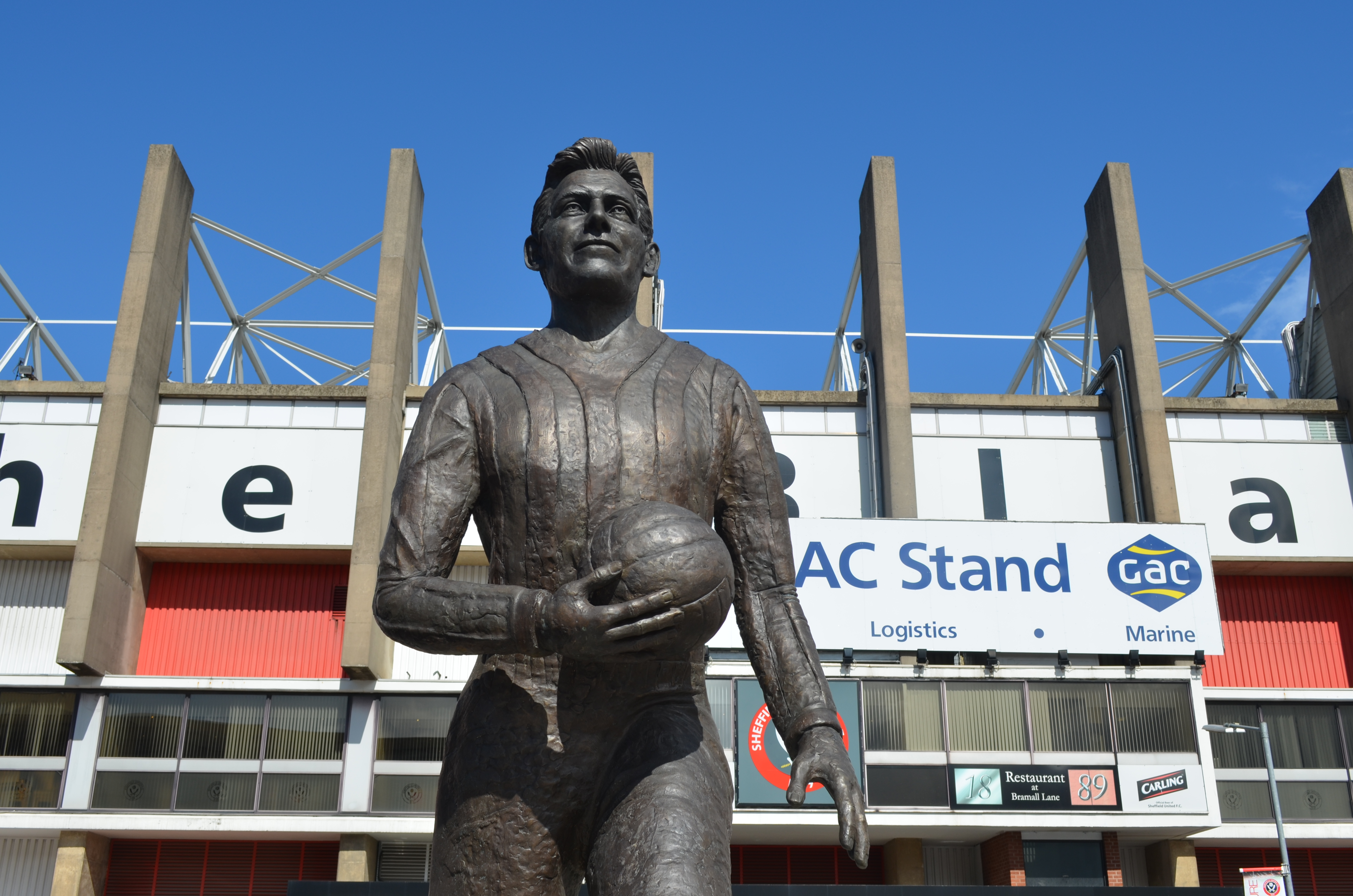
Statue of Shaw outside Bramall Lane, 2012

Joseph Shaw (23 June 1928 – 18 November 2007) was an English footballer who played for Sheffield United between 1945 and 1966. He also worked as a manager, being in charge of York City from 1967 to 1968 and Chesterfield from 1973 to 1976.

== Career ==
Shaw made 714 appearances for Sheffield United in all competitions, including 632 in the League and 53 FA Cup ties, all three being club records. Shaw was a former Durham County schoolboy who joined United from Upton Colliery as an inside-forward and later successfully converted into a half back.

He played for United in two wartime fixtures in the Football League North during the 1944–45 season. The first game was a 3–1 victory over Huddersfield Town on 2 April 1945 when Shaw was just 16 years and 285 days old.

His League debut came in a Division One game against Liverpool on 30 August 1948, with United severely short of players, as a left-back. United lost 2–1, mainly against 10 men. Shaw was off the field with a bleeding nose when the first went in after around 21 minutes, missing a quarter of an hour of the first half and the majority of the second.

In the next few years he played at wing half and right half, but after two heavy defeats in season 1954–55, Reg Freeman decided to select him at centre half. He was described as hard-working, the pivot of United's "double banking" defensive system, where his lack of height never let him down owing to his superb anticipation and ability to read the game.

He was so successful that he was selected for the position for the Football League XI although the England cap that many thought he deserved was never awarded. In 1951, he also toured Australia with a Football Association team.

His 600th League appearance came on 6 February 1965 in a 2–1 victory over West Ham United and his last game was against the same team on 19 February 1966. He had three spells as team captain, 1954–1956, 1957 and 1964–1965.

He died at the age of 79 on 18 November 2007 in Sheffield. In 2010, a statue of Shaw was erected at the Bramall Lane home of Sheffield United, to commemorate his service to the club.

== Career statistics ==
Season	Division	League Apps	League Goals	FA Cup Apps	FA Cup Goals	League Cup Apps	League Cup Goals	Other Apps	Other Goals	Total Apps	Total Goals
1944–45	North							2		2	
1948–49	One	19						2		21	
1949–50	Two	37	2	3				2		42	2
1950–51	Two	36	2					1		37	2
1951–52	Two	39	1	5				2	1	46	2
1952–53	Two	42		3				1		46	
1953–54	One	35	1	2				3		40	1
1954–55	One	41		1				1		43	
1955–56	One	20						1		21	
1956–57	Two	30		1				1		32	
1957–58	Two	41		4				3		48	
1958–59	Two	41		6				2		49	
1959–60	Two	39		3				2		44	
1960–61	Two	42		7		1				50	
1961–62	One	37		5		5				47	
1962–63	One	40		3		1				44	
1963–64	One	41	1	3						44	1
1964–65	One	25		3						28	
1965–66	One	27		2						29	
	Total	632	7	51		7		24	1	714	8

== Managerial statistics ==
Team	Nat	From	To	Record				
Team	Nat	From	To	G	W	L	D	Win %
York City	(England)	1 November 1967	1 August 1968	31	9	13	9	29.03
Chesterfield	(England)	1 September 1973	1 October 1976	143	54	53	36	36.87
