= South Kirkby Wednesday F.C. =

South Kirkby Wednesday
- Full name: South Kirkby Wednesday Football Club
- Nickname(s): The Wednesday
- Founded: 1905 as The Faith Street Football Club
- Dissolved: 1936
- Ground: South Kirkby Wednesday Ground, South Kirkby, West Yorkshire
- League: South Kirkby Football League

South Kirkby Wednesday Football Club were an English football club based in South Kirkby, West Yorkshire. The club were formed as The Faith Street Football Club but were known as South Kirkby Wednesday by 1905 at the latest, when they were competing in the FA Cup alongside local rivals South Kirkby Colliery and a fledgling Frickley Colliery. It is not known for certain where in South Kirkby the club played, though their ground was used by the Hemsworth and District Football Association to host cup finals and inter-league challenge games. It is presumed that the ground, known simply as the South Kirkby Wednesday Ground, was located near to or on Faith Street in South Kirkby.

== League history ==
In 1905 the club signalled their intention to join the new Hemsworth League, run by the West Yorkshire Association In the 1928/1929 season the club won the Doncaster Red Triangle League Division Two title. but at the end of the 1929/30 season the club withdrew from the league. In the 1930/31 season the club joined the South Kirkby Football League as founding members, though in the 1931/32 season the club rejoined the Doncaster Red Triangle League briefly, before returning to the South Kirkby League in the 1931/32 season. In the 1933/34 season the club again returned to the Doncaster Red Triangle League and the 1935/36 season saw the club return to the South Kirkby League before folding.

== Other cup competitions ==
For many seasons between the 1920s and 1930s the club took part in the Doncaster Infirmary Shield cup competition and the South Elmsall Challenge Cup. In the 1933/34 season the club reached the semi-final of the Doncaster and District Junior Challenge Cup

== Notable players ==
Notable former players include outside right J. Bennett who was signed for Rotherham United from the club in August 1933.

== Honours ==
- Doncaster Red Triangle League Division Two
  - Winners 1928–29
