= Charlie Williams (comedian) =

English footballer and comedian (1927–2006)

Charlie Williams MBE
- Williams appearing on The Comedians in the 1970s

Personal information
- Full name: Charles Adolphus Williams
- Date of birth: 23 December 1927
- Place of birth: Royston, South Yorkshire, England
- Date of death: 2 September 2006 (aged 78)
- Place of death: Barnsley, Yorkshire, England
- Position: Centre half

Youth career
- Upton Colliery

Senior career*
Years	Team	Apps	(Gls)
1948–1959	Doncaster Rovers	151	(1)
1959–196?	Skegness Town		
- * Club domestic league appearances and goals

Charles Adolphus Williams, MBE (23 December 1927 – 2 September 2006) was an English professional footballer and one of the first black players in British football after the Second World War, Later he became Britain's first well-known black stand-up comedian.

He became famous from his appearances on Granada Television's The Comedians and ATV's The Golden Shot, delivering his catchphrase, "me old flower" in his broad Yorkshire accent.

== Early life and football career ==
Williams was born in Royston, a small mining village in Barnsley, south Yorkshire. His father, also Charles, had come to Britain in 1914 from Barbados and enlisted in the Royal Engineers.

After the First World War, his father settled in Royston, where he sold groceries from a horse and cart, and married a local woman, Frances Cook. His father had been forced to give up his job as a greengrocer as a result of trench foot acquired in France and depended on National Assistance.

After leaving school aged 14 (when, according to his autobiography Ee-I've Had Some Laughs, his father died), Williams worked at Upton Colliery during the Second World War, a reserved occupation. He played football for the colliery team, before turning professional and signing for Doncaster Rovers in 1948, having also considered York City and Nottingham Forest, aged 19. A centre-half, he played for the first team in 1950 and became the first Black player to represent Doncaster Rovers when he made his debut in a home game against Tranmere Rovers on 3 May that year. He then remained in the reserves until 1955, when he became an established first team player for four years.

He played 171 times for Rovers in total, but scored only one goal, in a Second Division game away to Barnsley on 24 March 1956. In his own words, "I was never a fancy player, but I could stop them buggers that were." He ended his career with Skegness Town in the Midland League.

He married twice. He was first married to Audrey Crump on 1 April 1957. They had two children. He later married a second time, to Janice, who survived him.

== Showbusiness career ==
You have to understand that was perfect for the time that he appeared. It was a brilliant thing, this black Yorkshireman who played football with Doncaster Rovers, who'd had the wartime experience of white Yorkshire people, who talked like them, who thought like them, but who just happened to be black. And when he came along it was astounding to hear this bloke talking like "Eh up, flower, eh. Hey, have you ever been to supermarket where they have the broken biscuits?". I think it was a huge culture shock for people. And Charlie exploited this to the full.

— Lenny Henry in Windrush – The Irresistible Rise of Multiracial Britain

Following his retirement from football in 1959, Williams tried his hand as a singer in local working men's clubs, but it was his comic chat between the songs that was best received, so he decided to move into comedy full-time. He eventually became Britain's first well-known black television comedian. He came to prominence from 1971, when he began appearing regularly on The Comedians. The show broadcast stand-up routines from relatively unknown but often very experienced club comedians, including Frank Carson, Mike Reid and Bernard Manning. The novel combination of a black man with a Yorkshire accent and his first-hand experience of life in the British working class made him unmistakable.

Williams' comedy was often at his own expense, particularly his colour. He used to respond to heckling by saying: "If you don't shut up, I'll come and move in next door to you". Like other popular comedians of his era, his comedy included jokes about "Pakis" and "coons".

Nevertheless, in the 1970s he was a role model for a new generation of British black comedians, such as Lenny Henry and Gary Wilmot, when almost all others were white.

He reached the pinnacle of his comedy career in the early 1970s. In 1972, he spent a six-month season at the London Palladium; presented his own show, It's Charlie Williams, on Granada Television; was a subject on This Is Your Life, when he was surprised by Eamonn Andrews at the Batley Variety Club; and appeared at the Royal Variety Performance.

In 1973, he presented a one-off special Charlie Williams Show on BBC2, and published an autobiography, Ee-I've Had Some Laughs. He was popular enough at this time to be featured as the star of his own one page comic strip in IPC's Shiver and Shake comic at this time. He was also the host of ATV's popular game show The Golden Shot, along with hostess Wendy King, for a six-month period from late 1973 to early 1974, although he often struggled to hold together a fast-moving live show, and it ultimately had a detrimental effect on his career.

In 1976, Williams toured Rhodesia and appeared before audiences at packed nightclubs in Salisbury. At that time, the white minority rule government of Rhodesia had unilaterally declared independence from Britain, which had severed all ties with the Rhodesian government.

By the late 1970s and early 1980s, his brand of humour was becoming old-fashioned and his career was in decline. He caused offence to some, and was praised by others, for defending the Robertson's Golliwog trade mark and for saying that immigrants to the United Kingdom should conform to the British way of life.

He retired after a final tour in 1995.

== Recordings ==
In 1972 and 1973 Williams released two singles, That's what I shoulda said (1972) and Smile (1973), released on Columbia. In 1973, he also had an album issued by the label, You Can't Help Liking.......Charlie Williams.

In 1974, he released the pop single Ta Luv, on the Pye Records label, a song taken from The Good Companions musical.

== Later life ==
Williams was appointed a Member of the Order of the British Empire (MBE) in the 1999 New Year Honours "for charitable services to the community in Yorkshire." He was given a lifetime achievement award at the Black Comedy Awards in 2000, where it was recognised that he had "broken down barriers". In 2004, he was voted Doncaster Rovers' "all-time cult hero" by viewers of the BBC's Football Focus programme. Williams suffered from Parkinson's disease in his later life, and died on 2 September 2006, aged 78.
