= Upton Colliery F.C. =

Upton Colliery
- Full name: Upton Colliery Football Club
- Founded: 1931
- Dissolved: 1964
- Ground: Colliery Ground
Home colours

Upton Colliery Football Club was an English association football club based in Upton, West Yorkshire. From 1933 to 1947 it was a prominent member of the Yorkshire Football League.

== Stadium ==
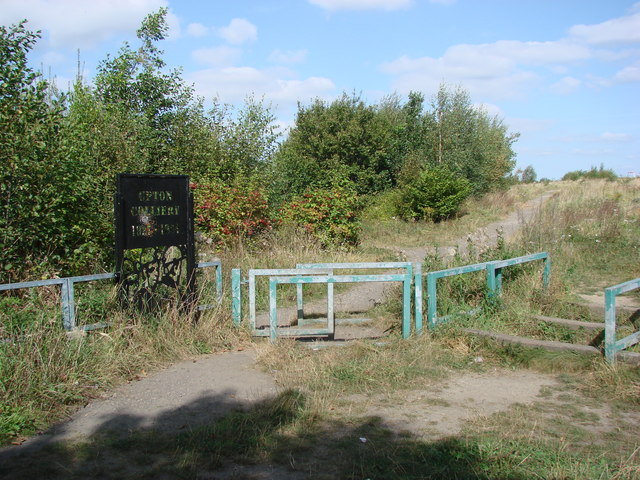
The former entrance to part of the Colliery Ground recreation area.

The club played at the Colliery Ground, located near to the Upton Colliery site. In 1949 the stadium facilities were apparently deemed not sufficient for the club to gain re-election to the Yorkshire Football League. The ground is still used for local football today, little of the original colliery buildings or stadium facilities remain.

== History ==
Upton Colliery was formed in 1931 as the colliery works team of Upton Colliery, and initially competed in the South Kirkby and District League and Doncaster & District Senior League before joining the Yorkshire Football League in 1933. In the 1934–1935 season the club missed out on being league champions by goal difference alone. After the break in Yorkshire Football League football for the Second World War the club re-joined the Yorkshire Football League, before dropping down into the Sheffield Association League after the 1946–1947 season. The club ceased to operate sometime around 1964, when the colliery itself was closed.

== FA Cup history ==
Upton first competed in the FA Cup in the 1939–1940 season and competed in the competition every season between 1945 and 1960. The club reached the third qualifying round on three occasions.

== Other cup competitions ==
The club is known to have competed in the Sheffield and Hallamshire Senior Cup, winning the cup on two occasions. They also competed in the Wharncliffe Charity Cup and the Castleford & District FA Embleton Cup.

== Notable players ==
- Clarrie Jordan who jointly holds the record of scoring in 10 consecutive games in the Football League began his career with Upton Colliery.
- Joe Shaw, who holds a number of club records for Sheffield United, began his career at the club.
- Charlie Williams, who was a pioneer of post-war black professional footballers in England and was later a successful comedian, also began his career at Upton.

== Honours ==
- Yorkshire Football League
  - Runners-up 1934/35
- Sheffield and Hallamshire Senior Cup
  - Winners 1936/37, 1949/50
- Sheffield Association League
  - Winners 1953/54, 1955/56, 1956/57, 1958/59

== Records ==
- FA Cup
  - Third qualifying round, 1951–52, 1953–54, 1954–55
