= Pontefract Greyhound Stadium =

Greyhound racing stadium in West Yorkshire

- Location: Baghill Lane, Pontefract, West Yorkshire
- Coordinates: 53°41′30″N 1°17′36″W
- Opened: 1938
- Closed: 1969

Pontefract Greyhound Stadium originally known as the Pontefract Willow Park Electric Hare Stadium was a greyhound racing stadium located on the north side of Baghill Lane in Pontefract, West Yorkshire, England.

== Greyhound racing ==
Claude Firth, licensee of the Willow Park Hotel gained permission from the landlords to lease four acres of land. A greyhound track was constructed by Firth and his business partners J.W. Penty and Percy Smith. The stadium was located on an existing football ground. The racing was independent (not affiliated to the sports governing body the National Greyhound Racing Club).

When opening the stadium was called the Pontefract Willow Park Electric Hare Stadium. A two-year lease was agreed with Carters Knottingley Brewery Co Ltd at £30 per year and racing started in 1938. After the war further leases were agreed and in January 1951 the site of the Willow Park track had a value of £2,135.

== Closure ==
In January 1964 the Carters Brewery integrated with parent company B.Y.B. Ltd and they sold the Willow Park site, which led to an agreement with Tees Land Investment Co Ltd & the local council in approving private housing development. The last meeting was held on 28 June 1969.
