= South Kirkby =

Town in West Yorkshire, England

Coordinates: 53.592°N 1.322°W

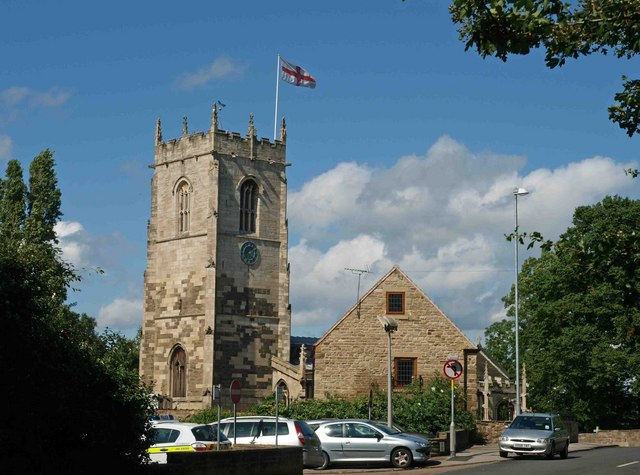
- All Saints Church, South Kirkby

- Location within West Yorkshire
- OS grid reference: SE454107
- Civil parish: South Kirkby and Moorthorpe
- Metropolitan borough: City of Wakefield
- Metropolitan county: West Yorkshire
- Region: Yorkshire and the Humber
- Country: England
- Sovereign state: United Kingdom
- Post town: PONTEFRACT
- Postcode district: WF9
- Dialling code: 01977
- Police: West Yorkshire
- Fire: West Yorkshire
- Ambulance: Yorkshire
- UK Parliament: Normanton and Hemsworth

South Kirkby is a town in the City of Wakefield in West Yorkshire, England which is governed locally by South Kirkby and Moorthorpe Town Council. The town forms half of the civil parish of South Kirkby and Moorthorpe. The parish has a population of 10,979.

== Town council ==
The town retains its own town council and is represented on the district council by Wilf Benson (Independent), Michelle Collins (Labour Party) and Steve Tulley (Labour Party).

The South Kirkby and Moorthorpe Town Council motto is 'Friendship, Unity & Progress', and the two settlements have been twinned with Sprockhövel in the Ruhr Valley of Germany since 1981. The establishment of 'Sprockhövel International Friendship Circle' led to the same named organisation in South Kirkby & Moorthorpe. Since that time the Sprockhövel IFK and the South Kirkby & Moorthorpe IFC have organised an annual exchange visit.

== History ==
The name Kirkby derives from the Old Norse kirkju-býr meaning 'village by/with a church'.

The town was first mentioned 1086 in the Domesday Book, and South Kirkby retains the site of the original Angle settlement (Grid ref: SE434104). The foundations and part of the walls of 'All Saints Church' in South Kirkby are from the period. For many centuries, they were both simply farming villages until the start of the Industrial Revolution. Hague Hall was located in South Kirkby before it was demolished in 1910 as a result of mining subsidence. In 1881, with the foundation of the South Kirkby Colliery coal mine, an increase in population caused the villages to be extended until at its largest the two settlements housed almost all of the 3,000 workers employed in the mine. In 1984, the miners' strike included the colliery's workforce but in vain. During the miner’s strike local man David Gareth Jones was killed whilst on picket at Ollerton Colliery. In 1988, South Kirkby Colliery along with many of the other coal mines in the immediate area closed and later cleared for redevelopment. These included South Kirkby-Ferrymoor Riddings Drift, Frickley Colliery (Carlton Main), Kinsley Drift (formerly Hemsworth Colliery), and Grimethorpe Colliery.

== Sport ==
The town is home to South Kirkby Colliery football club, who have competed in the FA Cup many times in their history. Another early football club of note in the town were South Kirkby Wednesday, who were early rivals of South Kirkby Colliery and nearby Frickley Colliery.

== Transport ==
South Kirkby is served by two railway stations with a distance of one mile (1.6 km) between them. Moorthorpe railway station is on line between Leeds and Sheffield with services being hourly every day. South Elmsall railway station is on the line between Doncaster and Leeds with also an hourly service every day. Both stations are served by Northern. The town was also served at one point by Hemsworth and South Kirkby railway station on the Hull and Barnsley Railway but this closed in the 1930s.

== Notable residents ==
Wayne Benn grew up in the town and played professional football for Bradford City.

== See also ==
- Listed buildings in South Kirkby and Moorthorpe
