= City of Wakefield =

City in West Yorkshire, England

- City and Metropolitan borough
- Wakefield
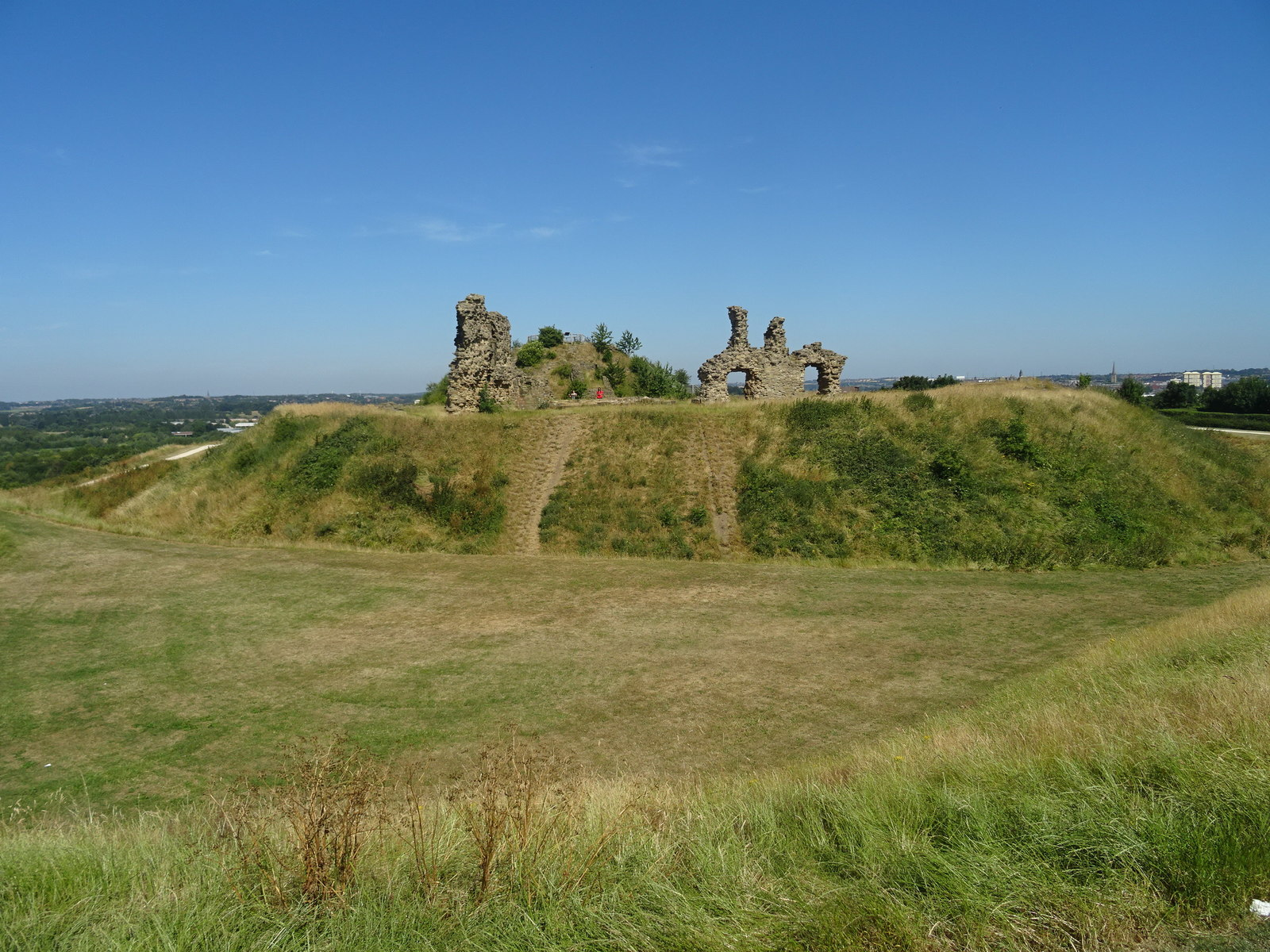
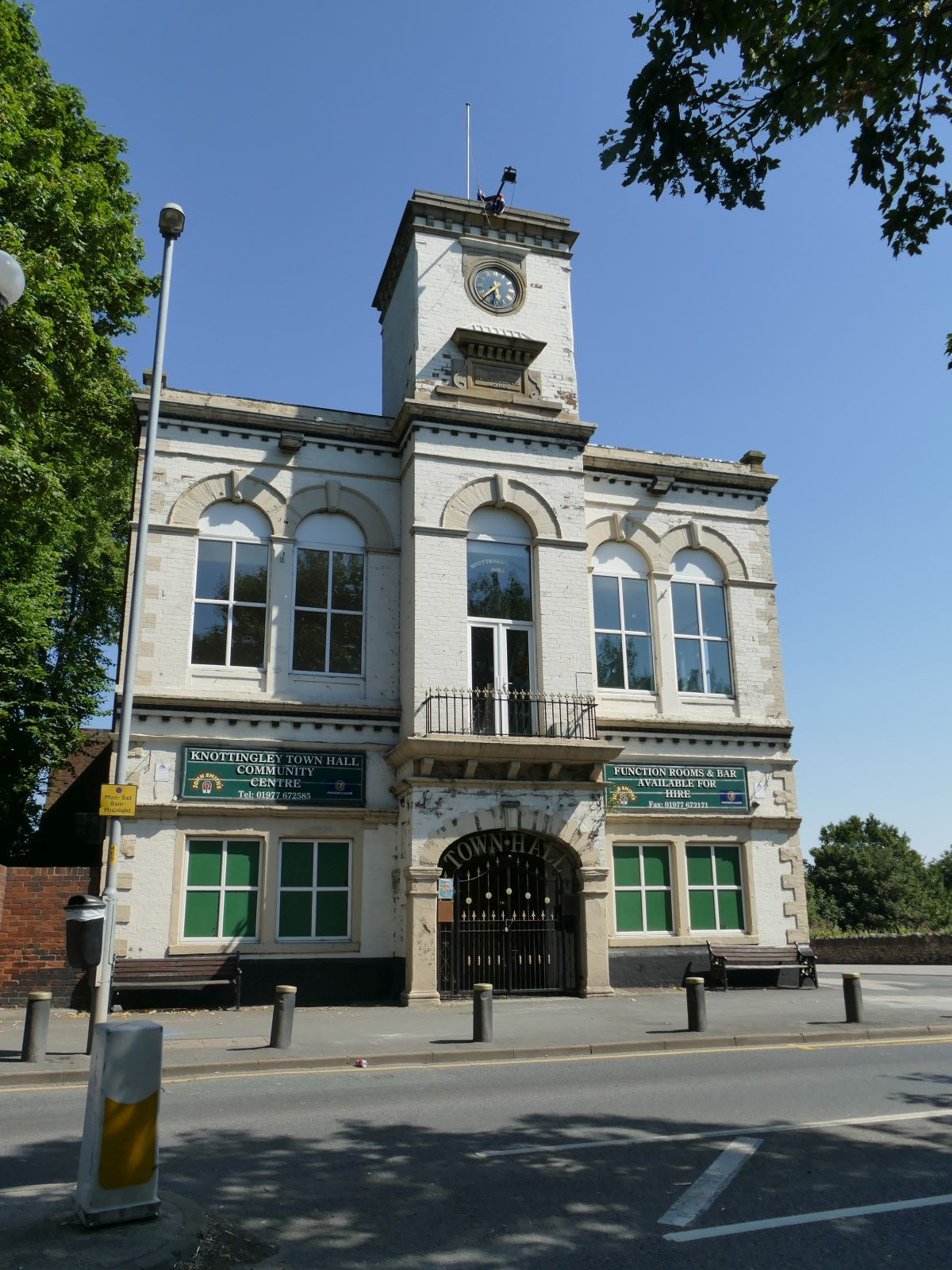
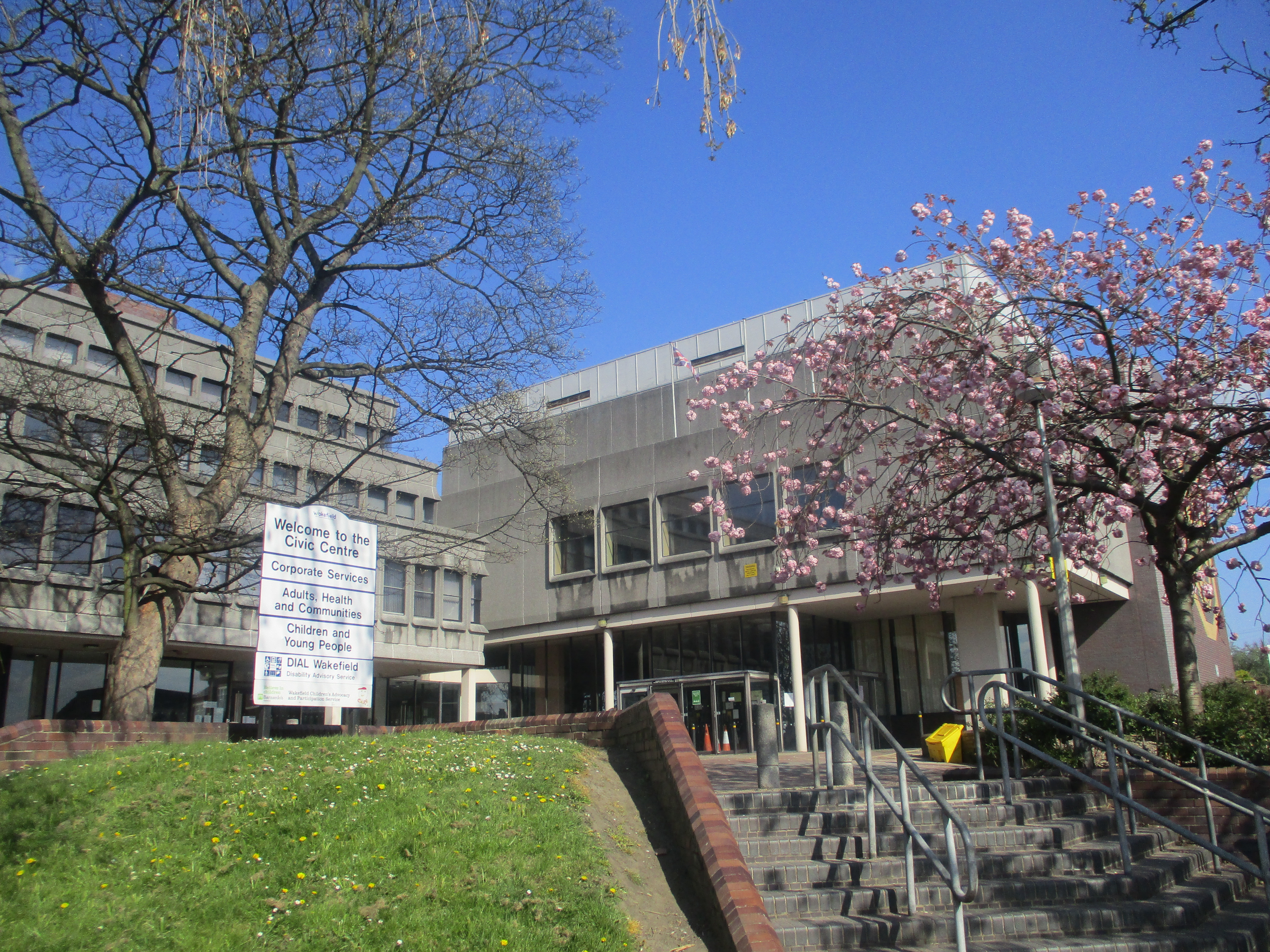
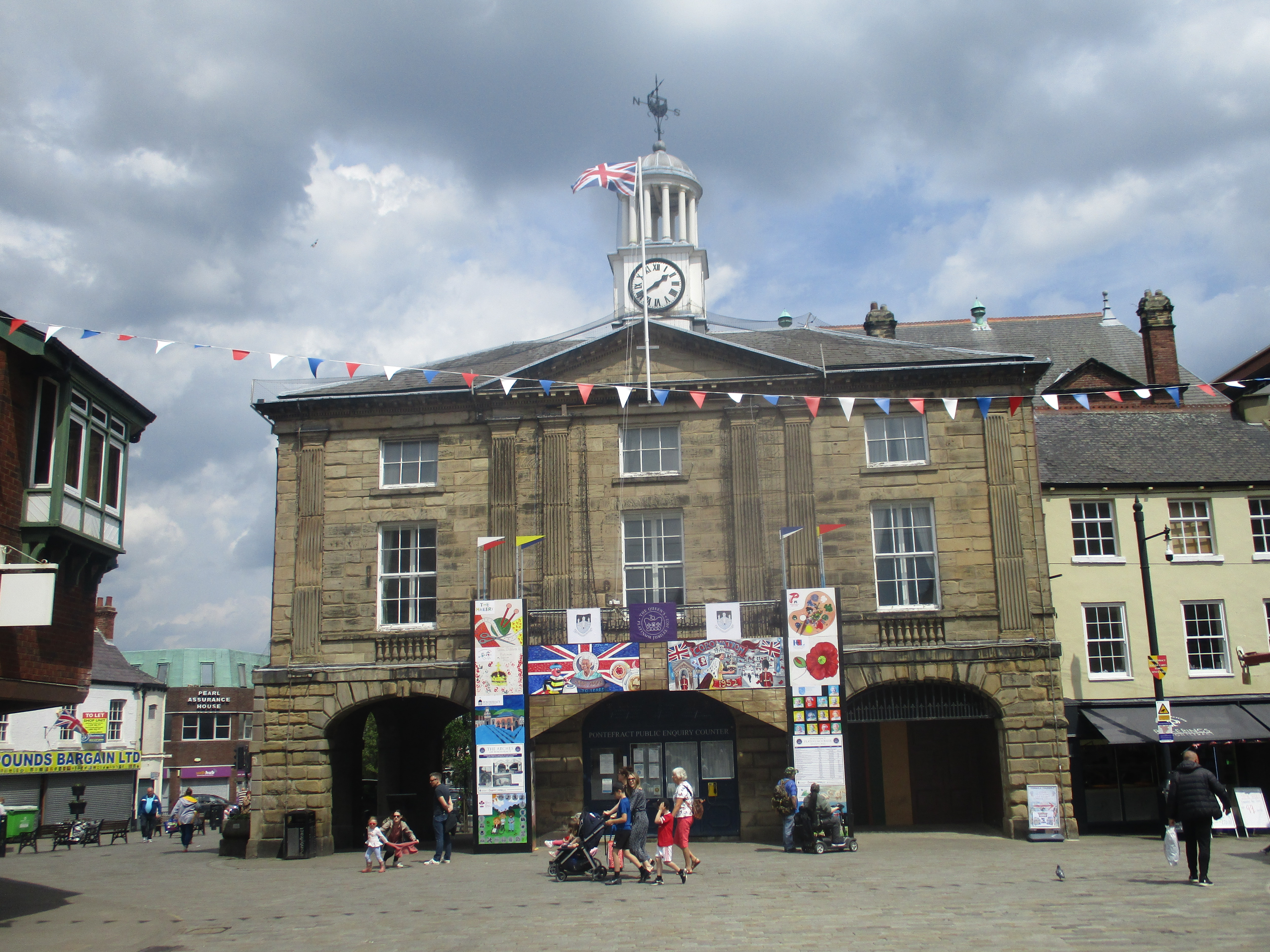
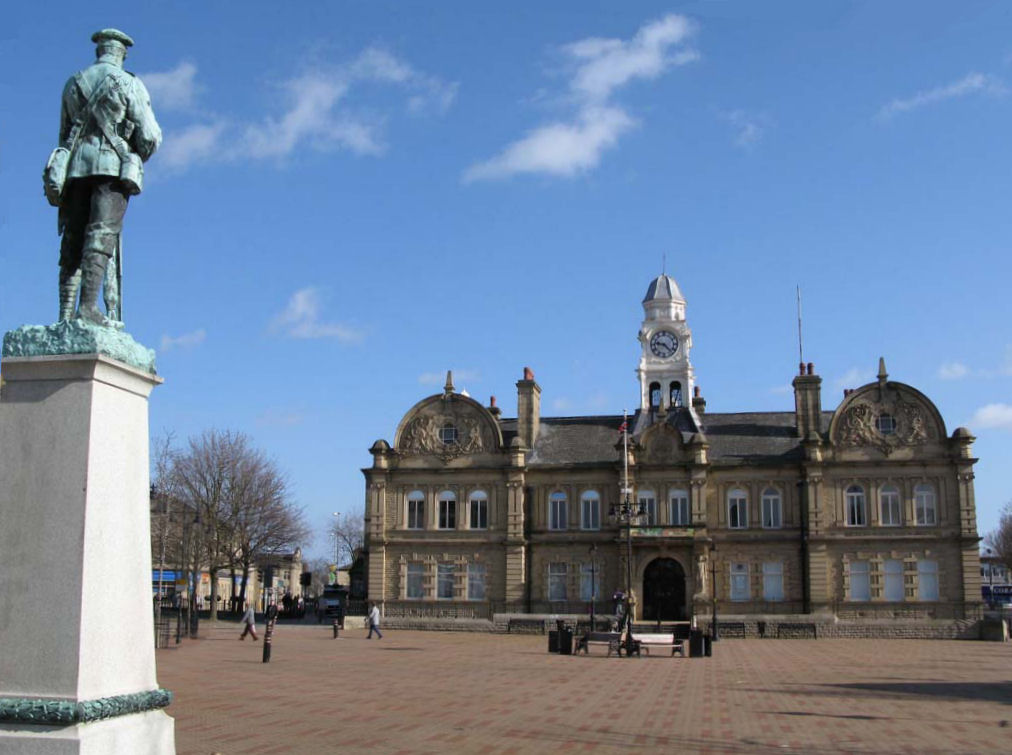
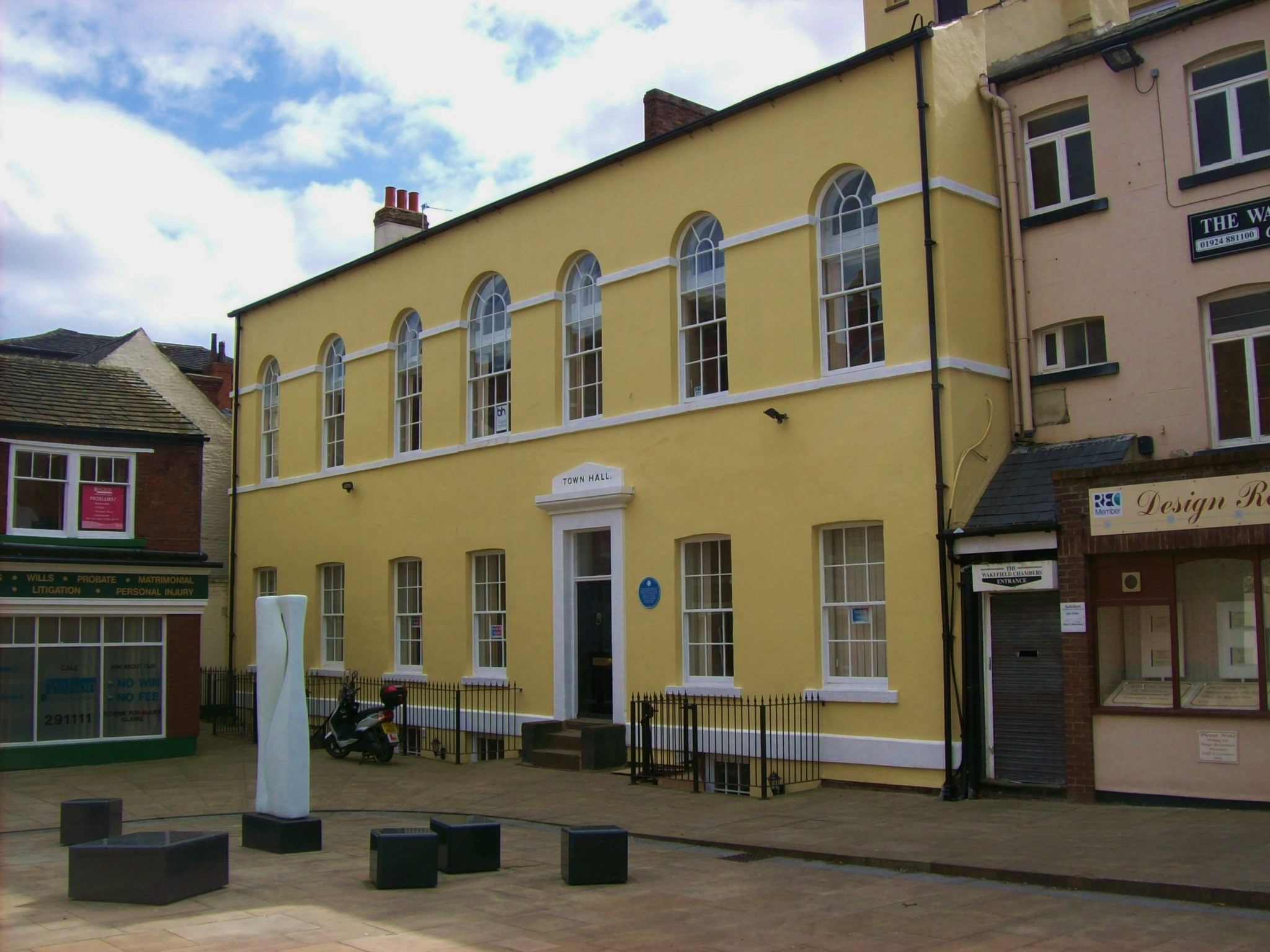
- From left to right; Top: Sandal Castle in Sandal and Knottingley Town Hall; Upper: Castleford Civic Centre and Pontefract Old Town Hall; Bottom: Ossett Town Hall and Wakefield Old Town Hall

- Coat of arms of Wakefield Metropolitan District Council

- Wakefield shown within West Yorkshire
- Coordinates: 53.683°N 1.499°W
- Sovereign state: United Kingdom
- Country: England
- Region: Yorkshire and the Humber
- Ceremonial county: West Yorkshire
- Founded: 1974
- Admin. HQ: Wakefield

Government
  - Type: Metropolitan borough, City
  - Governing body: Wakefield Council
  - Leadership: Leader & Cabinet
  - Executive: Reform UK
  - MPs: Yvette Cooper (L); Mark Sewards (L); Simon Lightwood (L); Jon Trickett (L)

Area
  - Total: 131 sq mi (339 km^{2})
  - Rank: 108th

Population (2024)
  - Total: 367,666
  - Rank: Ranked 27th
  - Density: 2,810/sq mi (1,080/km^{2})

Ethnicity (2021)
  - Ethnic groups: List: 93% White; 3.6% Asian; 1.4% Mixed; 1.3% Black; 0.7% other

Religion (2021)
  - Religion: List: 49% Christianity; 41.3% no religion; 3.2% Islam; 5.4% not stated; 0.4% other; 0.4% Hinduism; 0.2% Buddhism; 0.1% Sikhism; 0.1% Judaism
- Time zone: UTC+0 (Greenwich Mean Time)
  - Summer (DST): UTC+1 (British Summer Time)
- ISO 3166 code: GB-WKF
- NUTS: 3
- Website: www.wakefield.gov.uk

Wakefield, also known as the City of Wakefield, is a local government district with city status and a metropolitan district in West Yorkshire, England. Wakefield, the largest settlement, is the administrative centre of the district. The population of the City of Wakefield at the 2011 Census was 325,837.

The district includes the Five Towns, namely Castleford, Featherstone, Knottingley, Normanton and Pontefract. Other towns include Hemsworth, Horbury, Ossett, South Elmsall and South Kirkby (also forms the civil parish of South Kirkby and Moorthorpe). The city and district are governed by Wakefield Council from the County Hall. In 2010, Wakefield was named as the UK's third most musical city by PRS for Music.

== History ==
The former Borough of Wakefield was raised to city status by letters patent in 1888. It became a county borough in 1913, taking it out of the jurisdiction of the West Riding County Council. The present boundaries were set in 1974 by the Local Government Act 1972, when the County Borough of Wakefield merged with the West Riding municipal boroughs of Castleford, Ossett and Pontefract, the urban districts of Featherstone, Hemsworth, Horbury, Knottingley, Normanton and Stanley, along with Wakefield Rural District and parts of Hemsworth Rural District and Osgoldcross Rural District. The new metropolitan district's city status was reconfirmed by letters patent in 1974. The Council's headquarters is County Hall, originally built for the West Riding County Council and acquired by Wakefield in 1989.

== Geography ==
The district covers some 338 square kilometres, with about 70% of the area being green belt.

=== Green belt ===
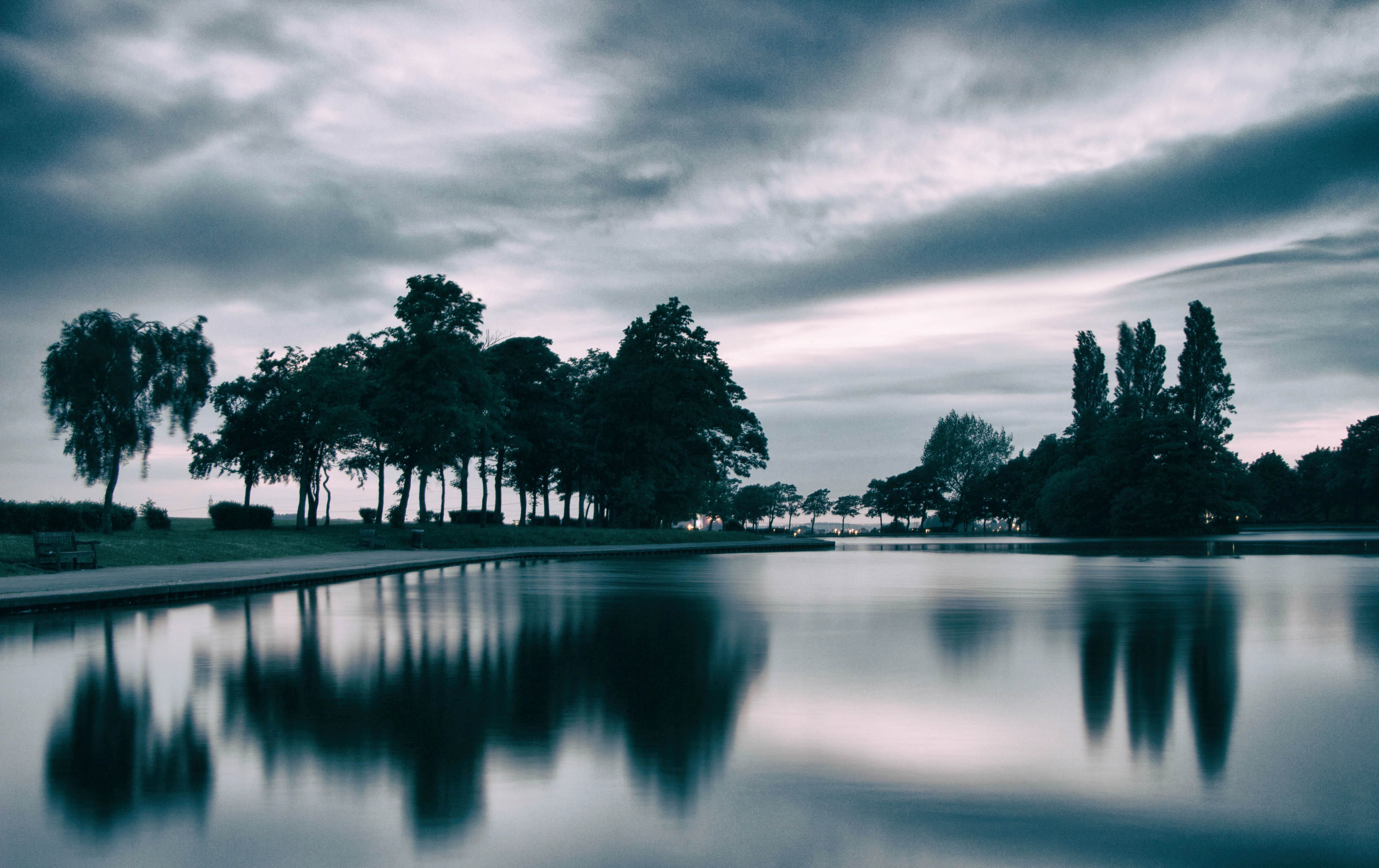
Pontefract Park

The green belt region extends into the surrounding counties and aims to reduce urban sprawl, protect the cities and towns in the West Yorkshire Urban Area conurbation from convergence, protect the identity of outlying communities, encourage brownfield reuse, and preserve the countryside. It restricts inappropriate development within the designated areas and imposes stricter conditions on permitted building. Green belt surrounds the Wakefield built up area and stretches into the wider borough and outlying towns and villages. Walton, Netherton, Featherstone, South Kirkby, South Elmsall, Hemsworth, Castleford, Knottingley, and Pontefract are surrounded by it. Smaller villages, hamlets and rural areas such as Warmfield and Heath, Stanley Ferry, Newmillerdam, Snydale, Wintersett, and Chapelthorpe are included in the designation. The green belt was adopted in 1987, and in 2017 amounted to some 23,500 hectares (235 km^{2}; 91 sq mi).

== Demography ==
=== Ethnicity ===
Ethnic Group	1981 estimations		1991 census		2001 census		2011 census		2021 census	
Ethnic Group	Number	%	Number	%	Number	%	Number	%	Number	%
White: Total	315,314	98.9%	311,518	98.5%	308,050	97.8%	310,957	95.4%	328,742	93%
White: British	–	–	–	–	304,734	96.7%	302,331		311,634	88.2%
White: Irish	–	–	–	–	1,262	0.4%	908		963	
White: Gypsy or Irish Traveller	–	–	–	–	–	–	302		280	
White: Roma	–	–	–	–	–	–	–	–	228	
White: Other	–	–	–	–	2,054	0.7%	7,416		15,637	
Asian or Asian British: Total	2,631		3,679		4,924		8,498		12,633	
Asian or Asian British: Indian	634		819		980		1,540		2,291	
Asian or Asian British: Pakistani	1,588		2,252		3,174		4,896		7,107	
Asian or Asian British: Bangladeshi	14		13		21		32		74	
Asian or Asian British: Chinese	297		402		493		853		1,113	
Asian or Asian British: Other Asian	98		193		256		1,177		2,048	
Black or Black British: Total	407		513		437		2,512		4,516	
Black or Black British: Caribbean	150		180		191		326		361	
Black or Black British: African	100		134		207		1,955		3,589	
Black or Black British: Other Black	157		199		39		231		566	
Mixed: Total	–	–	–	–	1,447		2,928		4,938	
Mixed: White and Black Caribbean	–	–	–	–	509		1,087		1,338	
Mixed: White and Black African	–	–	–	–	144		368		859	
Mixed: White and Asian	–	–	–	–	503		894		1,708	
Mixed: Other Mixed	–	–	–	–	291		579		1,033	
Other: Total	376		491		314		942		2,541	
Other: Arab	–	–	–	–	–	–	382		559	
Other: Any other ethnic group	376		491		314		560		1,982	
Ethnic minority	3,413		4,682		7,122		14,880		24,628	
Total	318,727	100%	316,200	100%	315,172	100%	325,837	100%	353,370	100%

== Governance ==
The district is divided into 21 wards, each represented on Wakefield Metropolitan District Council by three councillors. Councillors are elected on a first past the post basis, usually for a four-year period which is staggered so that only one councillor per ward is up for election at any one time. Exceptions include by-elections and ward boundary changes.

== Sports ==
The city district is home to three professional rugby league clubs, the Wakefield Trinity, Castleford Tigers who both play in the Super League and Featherstone Rovers who play in the Kingstone Press Championship. All three have had periods of success. The city also has several amateur rugby league clubs including Featherstone Lions and Normanton Knights. Current England rugby league internationals from the area include Tom Briscoe, Rob Burrow, Zak Hardaker, and Brett Ferres. The district is also home to two clubs in the Northern Premier League: Ossett United and Pontefract Collieries.

The district has a strong heritage of cricket with former Yorkshire and England captain Geoffrey Boycott born in Fitzwilliam and former Yorkshire and England cricketer Tim Bresnan from Pontefract.

Pontefract Racecourse in Pontefract, is the longest continuous horse racing circuit in Europe at 2 miles 125 yards (3,333 m; 16.57 furlongs).

== Economy ==
The economic and physical condition of several of the former mining towns and villages in Wakefield District have started to improve due to the booming economy of Leeds – and an increase in numbers of commuters to the city from the sub-region – and a recognition of undeveloped assets. For instance Castleford, to the North East of Wakefield is seeing extensive development and investment because of the natural asset of its outlook on to the River Aire, its easy access to the national motorway network and the availability of former mining land for house-building. In Ossett, house prices have risen from an average of £50,000 in 1998 to £130,000 in 2003.

Although unemployment was amongst the highest in the country for most of the 1980s, and 1990s, Wakefield District now has below-average unemployment. The "Wakefield East" ward had 4.7% unemployment in May 2005 (source: Office for National Statistics)—which was more than 1% higher than any other ward. The eastern half of the district remains considerably less prosperous than the western half, with several deprived wards

The district is mainly made out of old coal-mining towns, although other industries include wool, chemicals, machine tools, glass and other forms of manufacturing. Horbury is something of an anomaly in having had an iron works. When Margaret Thatcher came to power in 1979 there were 21 pits in the district. By the time the 1984 Strike began this had decreased to 15, however it still had more collieries than any other district in the country. At the time of privatization in November 1994, only two remained: the Prince of Wales at Pontefract, which closed in 2002, and Kellingley at Knottingley which closed in 2015 ending the industry that once dominated the district. Most of the district's pits had been very hardline during the 1984 strike.

== Culture ==
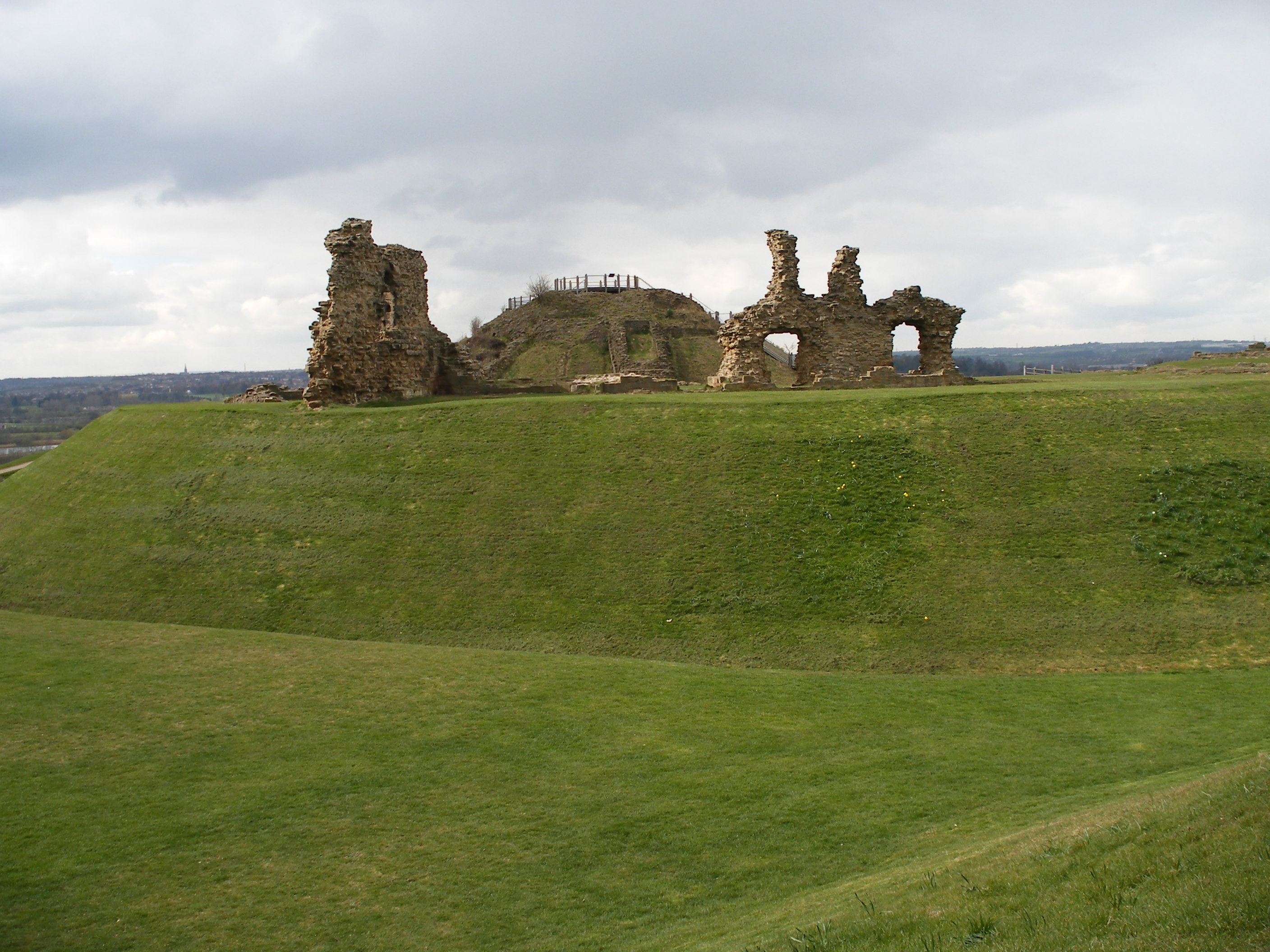
The ruins of Sandal Castle

The ruins of Sandal Castle and its visitor centre are open to the public, overlooking the Pugneys Country Park. The National Coal Mining Museum for England (an Anchor Point of ERIH, The European Route of Industrial Heritage), the Yorkshire Sculpture Park and Nostell Priory are within the Wakefield metropolitan area, as is Walton Hall, a Georgian mansion set in what was the world's first nature reserve, created by the explorer Charles Waterton; the house is now a proposed UNESCO World Heritage Site. Sir David Attenborough has stated that "Walton Hall is an extremely important site in the history of nature conservation worldwide. It is, arguably, the first tract of land anywhere in modern times to be protected, guarded and maintained as a nature reserve."

Two children's nursery rhymes with Wakefield connections are "Here We Go Round the Mulberry Bush" which may have been sung by women inmates at Wakefield prison. and "The Grand Old Duke of York" which may allude to the Battle of Wakefield in 1460, referring to Richard Plantagenet, the 3rd Duke of York. The lyrics of the popular hymn "Onward Christian Soldiers" were written at St Peter's Church in nearby Horbury.

== Media ==
=== Television ===
The area is served by BBC Yorkshire and ITV Yorkshire received from the Emley Moor TV transmitter.

=== Radio ===
The radio stations that broadcast to the area are:

BBC Local Radio

- BBC Radio Leeds

Independent Local Radio

- Heart Yorkshire
- Capital Yorkshire
- Hits Radio West Yorkshire
- Greatest Hits Radio West Yorkshire

Community Radio

- Rhubarb Radio
- 5 Towns FM

=== Newspapers ===
The area is served by the local newspaper, the Wakefield Express.

== Social housing ==
A decision was made, in 2004, to transfer the district's extensive council housing to Wakefield and District Housing (WDH), an 'independent' housing association, who would be more efficient with repairs and maintaining decent accommodation; as council housing represented almost 30% of the district, this was the second-largest stock transfer in British history. WDH are investing over £700 million to regenerate the District and working with partners, such as WMDC, are investing in new housing within the District. As of April 2025, WDH rebranded to Vico Homes.

== See also ==
- List of people from Wakefield
- The Ridings Centre
- Wakefield Trinity L.F.C.
