= All Saints' Church, Normanton =

Anglican Church in Normanton, West Yorkshire, England

All Saints' Church
- All Saints' Church
- 53.6979°N 1.4149°W
- OS grid reference: SE 38737 22539
- Location: Normanton, West Yorkshire
- Country: England
- Denomination: Anglican

Clergy
- Vicar: Rev’d Alan Murray

All Saints' Church is the parish church in Normanton, West Yorkshire, England.

== History ==
The current church is believed to have existed since at least 1256, and thought to have been commissioned by Roger Le Peytevin of Altofts Hall. However, a prior church is mentioned in the Domesday Book of 1086. It is likely that the current church stands on the lines of the original.

In 1256, Le Peytevin, a Norman Baron, granted the church to the Hospital of St. John, of the Knights Hospitallers, at Newland.

The building is in the Perpendicular style, being built mainly of coursed dressed sandstone blocks under a stone slate roof and consists of a three-bay chancel with a south chapel adjacent, a four-bay nave with north and south aisles and a clerestory. A tower was added to the western end in the 15th century. In the 19th century, clergy and choir vestries were added as well as an organ chamber. The building was granted Grade II* listing in 1965. The church was internally re-ordered in 1991 and again in 2019. The latest re-ordering has returned the church to an east-facing orientation.

== Notable monuments and contents ==
The church houses the Freeston Tomb, the burial place of Sir John Freeston of Altofts (d 1594), who by his will provided for an almshouse at Kirkthorpe and a grammar school for Normanton and Warmfield. His benefice still provides funding for the current secondary school in Normanton, the Freeston Business and Enterprise College.

In 1906, a medieval altar slab bearing five incised crosses was found under the sanctuary floor, where it had probably lain since the reformation. It now stands in the Lady Chapel and is used for weekly Eucharist.

There is low octagonal stone Font, now standing at the west end of the nave.

The window at the east end of the Lady Chapel depicting the fall of the Walls of Jericho, is a war memorial to the fallen of the Great War.

The window to the left of the porch was an addition in the late 1970s as a memorial to the explorer, Martin Frobisher of nearby Altofts.

All Saints' possesses two ancient silver cups, now housed in a collection at York Minster. The oldest was made in London in 1655 and is inscribed "Normanton cupp 1674". The second is two-handled porringer inscribed "The Gift of Mrs Henry Favell of Pontefract to the Church of Normanton for ever 1699"

In "Normanton, Past and Present," author Walter Hampson (1928) noted the monuments within the church: "The chapel is the burial place of the Bunnys of Newland, Torres of Snydale, Favells of Normanton, Smiths (now Bosworths) late of Newland and the Mallets and Levetts of Normanton. The Favells were an important Normanton family and were resident here in the early part of the 17th century. On the south chancel floor are memorial slabs of the Favells bearing the dates 1698, 1714, 1777 and others in the 18th century. Here also is a large altar tomb of the Malletts and Levetts. The Mallets it would seem were a very ancient family, as we are told their ancestors flourished here in the middle of the 13th century. The tomb on the top bears the arms of the Levetts together with the arms of the Mallets. On the wall above the tomb is an undated tablet recording that 'Mrs. Elizabeth Levett made benefaction for the poor of Normanton and Snydale, and for teaching poor children.' There also are tombs of the Torres mentioned under Snydale."

The Mallets and the Levetts had lived in Normanton for centuries. (The first High Sheriff of Yorkshire in 1069 was William Malet; Speaker of the House of Commons, and High Sheriff of Yorkshire Sir Thomas Gargrave had married Elizabeth, daughter of William Levett of Normanton).

There are several monuments in All Saints' Church to the Yorkshire antiquarian James Torre, who having graduated from the Inner Temple in London gave up the law, sold his properties and retired to do historical research at York, later purchasing the manor of Snydale. Torre died in 1699.

== Incumbents ==
There is list of incumbents engraved on an oak board above the door to the old clergy vestry on the north wall of the chancel dating back to Henry of Kyrkeby, clerk in 1252.

== See also ==
- List of places of worship in the City of Wakefield
- Grade II* listed buildings in West Yorkshire
- Listed buildings in Normanton, West Yorkshire
