= William Dixon =

William, Willie, Bill or Billy Dixon may refer to:

== Law and politics ==
- William Dixon (state representative) (1808–1887), English-born Wisconsin politician
- William W. Dixon (1838–1910), U.S. Representative from Montana
- William Dixon (Australian politician) (1860–1935), Australian politician
- William C. Dixon (1904–1997), American government antitrust lawyer and judge on the Ohio Supreme Court
- William P. Dixon (1943–2025), American lawyer and political strategist

== Religion ==
- William Henry Dixon (priest) (1783–1854), Church of England clergyman and antiquary
- William T. Dixon (1833–1909), American educator and Baptist minister in Brooklyn, New York
- William Gray Dixon (1854–1928), Scottish Presbyterian minister
- William Taylor Dixon (1879–1959), American minister and independent faith missionary to China
- William Dixon (priest) (born 1939), Dean of Barbados

== Sports ==
- William Dixon (cricketer) (1856–1938), New Zealand cricketer
- Billy Dixon (footballer, born 1905) (1905–1956), English footballer (Grimsby Town, Barrow AFC)
- Billy Dixon (footballer, born 1941), Irish footballer (Shamrock Rovers)
- Bill Dixon (rower) (1912–1969), Australian rower

== Others ==
- William Hepworth Dixon (1821–1879), English social and prison commentator
- Billy Dixon (1850–1913), American scout and hunter, civilian recipient of the Medal of Honor
- William Macneile Dixon (1866–1946), British author
- Willie Dixon (1915–1992), U.S. blues musician
- Bill Dixon (1925–2010), American musician and artist
- William Dixon (fl. 1837), African American arrested in 1837
- William Dixon (industrialist, born 1753), British miner and industrialist
- William Dixon (industrialist, born 1788), Scottish industrialist

== Other uses ==
- William Dixon manuscript, the earliest manuscript of bagpipe music from the UK, compiled in 1733 by a piper from Northumberland
- Billy Dixon and the Tropics, a nom de disque for the 1950s pop/rock group Four Lovers who evolved into The Four Seasons

== See also ==
- William Dickson (disambiguation)
- William Dixson (1870–1952), Australian businessman and benefactor
- William Dixon Allott, mayor of Adelaide, Australia
- Will Dixon (born 1950), English footballer
