= Freeston =

Freeston is a surname. Notable people with the surname include:

- Sir Brian Freeston (1892–1958), British colonial official
- Jesse Freeston (born 1985), Canadian video journalist and filmmaker
- John Freeston (1512–1594), English barrister, founder of the Normanton Grammar School
- Nicholas Freeston (1907–1978), English poet

== See also ==
- Freeston Academy, a state-run, coeducational high school situated in Normanton, West Yorkshire
- Freestone (disambiguation)
- Freston (disambiguation)
