= Heath Hall, Heath, West Yorkshire =

Heath Hall
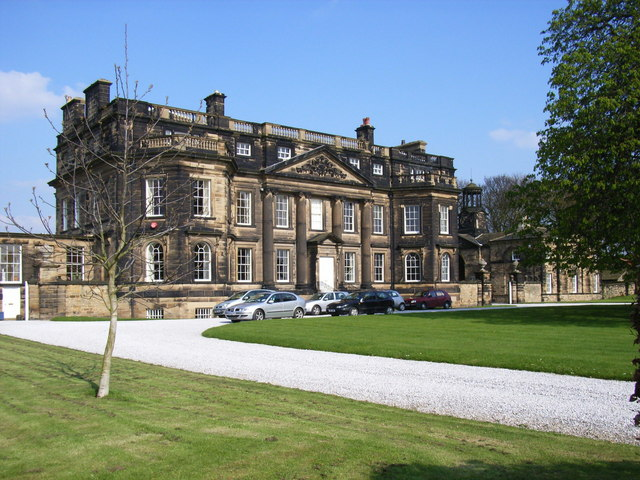
- "a magnificent composition, one of John Carr's finest houses"

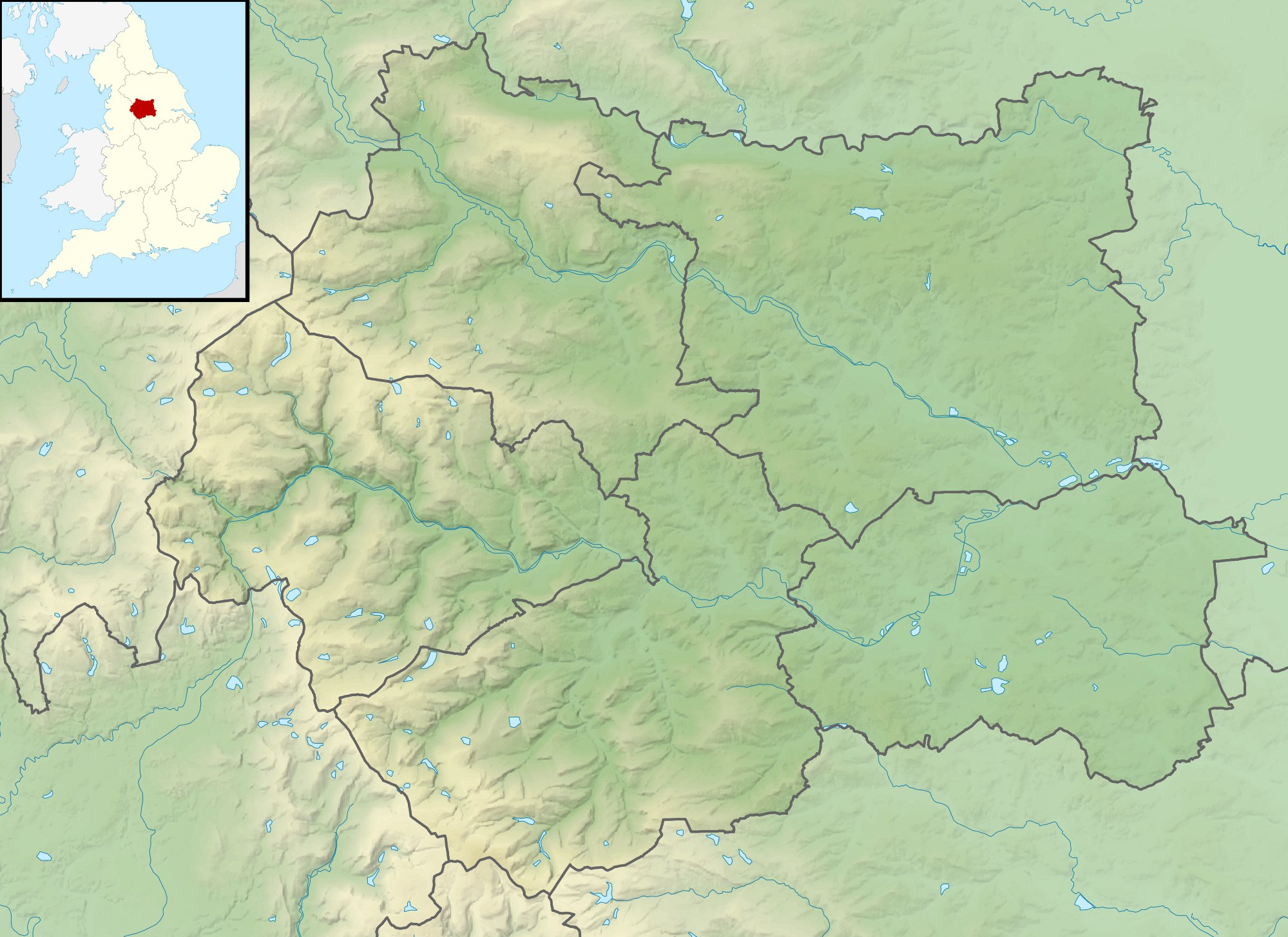
- Location within West Yorkshire
- 53.6769°N 1.4632°W
- Type: House
- Location: Heath, Wakefield, West Yorkshire

History
- Built: 1709

Site notes
- Architect(s): John Carr, Anthony Salvin
- Architectural style: Neoclassical
- Governing body: Privately owned

Listed Building – Grade I
- Official name: Heath Hall
- Designated: 14 February 1952
- Reference no.: 1200238

Listed Building – Grade I
- Official name: Flanking screen walls and gate piers to west front of Heath Hall
- Designated: 14 February 1952
- Reference no.: 1200345

Listed Building – Grade I
- Official name: The Brewhouse and East Pavilion at Heath Hall
- Designated: 14 February 1952
- Reference no.: 1313191

Listed Building – Grade I
- Official name: The West Pavilion at Heath Hall
- Designated: 14 February 1952
- Reference no.: 1200273

Listed Building – Grade I
- Official name: The Stable House
- Designated: 14 February 1952
- Reference no.: 1135583

Heath Hall, Heath, Wakefield, West Yorkshire is a country house dating from 1709. Originally called Eshald House, the estate was purchased by John Smyth whose nephew engaged John Carr of York to reconstruct the house between 1754 and 1780. In the 19th century, the house was remodelled by Anthony Salvin. Heath Hall is a Grade I listed building.

== History ==
The original hall, called Eshald House, was built for, and probably designed by, Theophilus Shelton. In 1709 the estate was bought by John Smyth, who had made a considerable fortune as a wool trader. In 1754 his nephew, also John, commissioned John Carr to undertake a major expansion of the house. Work continued under Smyth's grandson, another John, until completion in 1780. The resulting mansion is described by Historic England as "a magnificent composition, one of [Carr's] finest houses". The Smyths established their place in society during construction, the grandson serving as member of parliament for Pontefract for 25 years, becoming a Lord of the Admiralty, a Lord of the Treasury, Master of the Mint, and eloping with, and marrying the daughter of the Duke of Grafton.

Smyth was succeeded by his second son, also John, who followed his father by marrying another Grafton daughter, Lady Elizabeth Fitzroy. In 1837 their son, John George, employed Anthony Salvin to extend the house, adding an attic storey, a porch, an extension to the north, and a billiard room. His son, George John, was the last Smyth squire of Heath Hall, letting it in 1882. On his death, his nephew sold the property to Lord Halifax, Foreign Secretary at the time of the Appeasement crisis who owned it until 1938.

The hall remains privately owned and is used as the corporate headquarters of a communications company.

== Architecture and description ==
Carr incorporated the original early 18th century house into his rebuilding, using it as the central block of his two-storeyed, 11-bay reconstruction. The hall is built of ashlar with slate roofs. The interior includes rococo plasterwork of a quality which Historic England considers surpasses anything Carr undertook elsewhere. Ruth Harman, in the 2017 revision to Pevsner's Yorkshire West Riding: Sheffield and the South describes the drawing room as "one of Carr's finest spaces".

The architectural historian Jill Allibone noted the Victorian extensions to the hall carried out for Colonel John George Smyth in 1837–1845. Harman criticises Salvin's attic additions, suggesting that they destroyed the "hierarchy of [Carr's] roofline".

Heath Hall is a Grade I listed building. (Note: There are three categories of listed status for buildings in England and Wales: Grade I: buildings of exceptional interest.; Grade II*: particularly important buildings of more than special interest.; Grade II: buildings that are of special interest, warranting every effort to preserve them.) The adjoining pavilions have their own Grade I listings, as does the hall's former brewhouse, now a separate private residence. The hall's flanking walls and gate piers are also listed Grade I, as are the former stables. These were renovated and converted into a private house by Muir and Mary Oddie. The barn is Grade II*.

The grounds of the house, and those of others on the heath are also registered.

== See also ==
- Grade I listed buildings in West Yorkshire
- Listed buildings in Warmfield cum Heath

== Sources ==
- Allibone, Jill (1988). Anthony Salvin: Pioneer of Gothic Revival Architecture. Cambridge: Lutterworth Press. ISBN 978-0-7188-2707-6. OCLC 1126398342.
- Harman, Ruth; Pevsner, Nikolaus (2017). Yorkshire: The West Riding: Sheffield and the South. The Buildings of England. New Haven, US and London: Yale University Press. ISBN 978--0-300-22468-9.
- James, John (1866). Continuation & additions to the History of Bradford and its Parish. London: Longman. OCLC 867386124.
- Worsley, Giles (2002). England's lost houses; from the archives of Country Life. London: Aurum. ISBN 1-85410-820-4. OCLC 48979659.
