= Freston =

Freston may refer to:

- Freston, Suffolk, a village south of Ipswich, England
- Freston causewayed enclosure, a Neolithic site near the village of Freston
- An alternative name for Friston, a village near Saxmundham, Suffolk, England

== People ==
- Anthony Freston (1757–1819), English Anglican clergyman
- Kathy Freston, American self-help author
- Tom Freston, American television executive

== See also ==
- Mission Freston was the code-name of the British Special Operations Executive (SOE) military mission under the command of Col. Capt D.T. Bill Hudson., to German-occupied Poland (1939–1945) during World War II.
- Freeston (disambiguation)
- Frestonia
