= Fireworks Village =

Coordinates: 55.83583°N 4.25639°W

Govan Colliery Houses: Fireworks Village
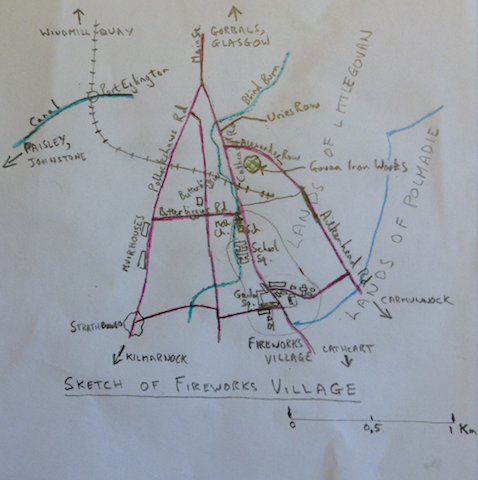
- Sketch of Fireworks Village and the surrounding area: Strathbungo, Port Eglinton and Govan Iron Works

- Location within Glasgow
- Population: 600 (1841)
- OS grid reference: NS895875
- Civil parish: Govan
- Council area: Glasgow
- Shire county: Lanarkshire
- Country: Scotland
- Sovereign state: United Kingdom

Fireworks village, also known as Govan Colliery Houses, was a company village in Scotland belonging to the Dixon family who ran the Govan Iron Works and Govan Colliery. The inhabitants were chiefly coal miners and their families who worked in the Govan Colliery. The company also built a Methodist church and a school. At the time, its location was a short distance outside the City of Glasgow, the largest town in Scotland; no trace now remains in the 21st century, with the site occupied by the now inner-city neighbourhood of Govanhill (the village was roughly located at Bankhall Street at the Govanhill Picture House.)

== History ==
The Govan Colliery, also known as the Little Govan Colliery, was worked from at least the 18th Century, William Dixon having started there as colliery manager in the 1770s. The colliery and later the iron works remained in the control of the Dixon family from then until 1873 when it became a limited company, William Dixon Ltd., and was no longer a family firm.

Between 1783 and 1785 the Govan Waggonway was built between the colliery and the River Clyde to the north.

In 1811, Dixons built a waggonway linking the colliery with the Glasgow, Paisley and Johnstone Canal at Port Eglinton, the Glasgow terminus. The canal was opened in 1810.

In 1820, Dixons bought the lands of Govanhill and the colliery. In 1830, an Act of Parliament authorized the construction of the Polloc and Govan Railway(sic) which was completed in 1840. It extended the old tramway past Port Eglinton to Windmill Quay on the Clyde in one direction and to Rutherglen in the other direction. The line now forms part of the West Coast Main Line.

In the 1860s the first tenements were built, which later formed the Burgh of Govanhill. The houses belonging to Fireworks were gradually demolished. In 1906, Garden Square, the last of the old Fireworks Village, was demolished.

== Geography ==
The village lay about 4 kilometres (2.5 mi) south of Glasgow City Chambers, just to the north of the junction of the turnpike between Glasgow and Carmunnock via Cathcart (now Cathcart Road) and the Rutherglen to Paisley road (now Allison Street). What is now Bankhall Street lies in the middle of the old village, which consisted of Hosie's Land and Garden Square to the west of the turnpike and Engine Row, the Back Close, Carter Row, the Cuddy Row and Graham Square to the east.

There was an outlier to the north called School Square (lying between Calder Street and Govanhill Street on the West side of the main road) after the Govan Colliery School, also built by Dixons, which lay even further North.

== Amenities ==
- Methodist church
- School
- Reading room with copies of national newspapers

== Bibliography ==
- Lewis, Samuel (1846). "A Topographical Dictionary of Scotland"
- Glasgow University Archive Service. "Records of the Poloc and Govan Railway and the Clydeside Junction Railway, Scotland"
- Smart, Aileen (2002). "Villages of Glasgow, Vol 2",
- MacLehose, James (1886) "Memoirs and portraits of one hundred Glasgow men"
