= James Torre =

James Torre (April 1649 – 31 July 1699) was an English antiquarian and genealogist, based initially in Lincolnshire and later Yorkshire. He published nothing, but his extensive manuscript notes have been influential on subsequent scholarship on the local history of Yorkshire and the ecclesiastical province of York.

== Early life and education ==
James Torre was born around 30 April 1649, when he was baptised in Haxey church (Lincolnshire). His family had been small landowners in the Isle of Axholme since the 15th century. He was the son of Gregory Torre, remembered as a defiant royalist by his descendants, and of his wife Anne, daughter and heir of John Farr of Epworth. Around 1650 Gregory's fortunes were partly retrieved when he inherited the substantial estate of his elder brother Thomas Torre, which included the small manor of Temple Belwood in Belton where James was to grow up.

He was educated at a school in Belton and matriculated into Magdalene College, Cambridge as a pensioner in June 1666, where he spent two and a half years, graduating B.A. in 1668. He entered the Inner Temple as a student, but was not called to the bar, though a list of his small library he made in 1686 shows that he at least bought the necessary textbooks.

== Early antiquarianism ==
Torre's early antiquarian interests may have been inspired by those of his legal guardian, the Revd Robert Mirfin; and he was probably also influenced by the antiquarian culture of the Inner Temple, where his contemporaries included the London antiquary Henry Keepe, and where there is some evidence that he was already making genealogical and heraldic notes. The estate and day books that Torre began keeping in 1671 show that he had been researching his own medieval ancestry; and he settled on a sign manual of James 'Turre', rather than 'Torre', as it reflected the medieval spelling of his family's surname.

== Lincolnshire, 1672–1687 ==
Torre had succeeded as an eleven-year-old to his father's not insubstantial estate in North Lincolnshire in 1660, and was brought up in the Elizabethan manor house that his predecessor Sir John Ferne had built at Temple Belwood on the outskirts of Belton. In 1672, now of age, James returned to Belton and spent £255 renovating the Ferne manor house, getting it ready to receive his bride, Elizabeth, youngest daughter of Dr William Lincolne, rector of West Halton and lord of the manor of Bottesford. They married at Bottesford that April, and he and his wife, whom he called 'Betty', settled into gentry life in Axholme. He was churchwarden of Belton parish between 1676 and 1678 and overseer of the poor in 1679. Torre's surviving day book for this period illustrates his busy activities in his twenties and thirties as a Lincolnshire landowner with an interest in cattle breeding, and visiting amongst a wide social circle in the parish gentry.

James and Betty lost several children in infancy; only one child, Jane (born 1682), survived to adulthood from their marriage. A son John died aged five in October 1682 and was buried in Belton church. The death of his father-in-law Dr Lincolne in 1681 led to a dispute amongst the heirs, two of them alleging irregularities in disposing of the doctor's property in his last years to Betty and her husband. It was settled by arbitration but appears to have left a bad taste in Torre's mouth.

== Yorkshire, 1687–1699 ==
There are indications that Torre was looking to Yorkshire for social as well as scholarly reasons before the 1680s. Betty Torre's closest family link was with her next eldest sister Dorothea, who had married as his second wife John Wyvell of Osgodby Hall in the North Riding of Yorkshire. The Torres visited Osgodby Hall regularly, and while there James interested himself in his brother-in-law's medieval charters and visited local churches to look at genealogical monuments. There is also good evidence that in the late 1670s he was already seeking the acquaintance of the circle of Yorkshire antiquarians around Dr Nathaniel Johnston of Pontefract as a way of furthering his genealogical work, which by 1685 had generated a substantial stack of notebooks. He was considering a move in the autumn of 1686, and at Michaelmas (29 September) 1687 he and his family quit Temple Belwood, which he had leased to another local landowner, Robert Popplewell, to move to York. The remainder of Torre's scholarship was carried out in Yorkshire, where he became a regular user of York Minster Library and Chapter Registry.

The focus of his work soon shifted away from his great genealogical scheme to correct and expand Sir William Dugdale's Baronage of England (1675–76) which he had been pursuing for a decade and more, to a new focus on the clergy and ecclesiastical history of the diocese of York, for which he is now chiefly famous. On the death of Betty Torre in 1693 he married Ann, daughter of Nicholas Lister of Rigton, by whom he was to have his son and heir Nicholas Torre (1694–1749).

== Death ==
In 1699, Torre sold his Lincolnshire properties to Robert Popplewell in order to finance the purchase of an estate at Snydale, near Wakefield. However, on 31 July 1699 he died of (according to his friend Ralph Thoresby) a "contagious disorder". He was buried in the parish church at Normanton. A brass was set up to his memory, which, along with other published memorials, testified to his civil and engaging personality as well as his learning, mourning him as "missed by all".

== Legacy ==
Torre published nothing from his great collection of notebooks, but the manuscript volumes of his Yorkshire collections have been highly influential on subsequent scholarship on the Diocese of York. Five folio volumes of Yorkshire notes were presented to the chapter library by Archbishop John Sharp's executors. The first volume has the title "Antiquities Ecclesiastical of the City of York concerning Churches, Parochial Conventual Chapels, Hospitals, and Gilds, and in them Chantries and Interments, also Churches Parochial and Conventual within the Archdeaconry of the West Riding, collected out of Publick Records and Registers, A.D. 1691". The other archdeaconries are treated in similar fashion in two more volumes; the fourth volume consists of peculiars.

Equally important was the list and digest he made of the collection of medieval charters and fragments which had once been stored in St Mary's Tower in York, and survived its destruction in 1644, but which have since been lost (Bodleian Library, MS Top Yorks b 14, fols 214v–261v); and transcripts from the lost cartulary of the Yorkshire gentry family of Metham of Metham.

Less well known and less ultimately useful to scholars are the many folio volumes he compiled after 1675 in pursuit of his genealogical master plan. Five volumes were recorded by Francis Drake as in the hands of Nicholas Torre in 1736. Eventually they came into the hands of his cousins, the Sykes family of Sledmere and were sold by Sir Christopher Sykes to the British Museum in 1881. They are now British Library Egerton MSS 2573–2577.

A further eight volumes of genealogical notes remained in the hands of the Torre family, to be left to York Minster Library by James's descendant, the Revd Henry J. Torre of Norton Curlieu (1819–1904) in his will. They are now MSS Additional 57–64 in the Minster Library.

Two of Torre's personal notebooks have also survived. One is an estate book, recording details of the rentals, charters and indentures of his Lincolnshire lands (British Library, Additional MS 34146). His day book, listing his daily expenses and receipts from 1672 to 1690. as well as the building accounts of 1672 for his renovations of his manor house of Temple Belwood, is held in the Leeds Library, MS Box IV 5.

== Posthumous reputation ==
Torre's life and career have been understood until recently through a memorial composed by the York historian Francis Drake nearly four decades after his death. Drake knew James's son Nicholas, but never met the man himself, and he interpreted Torre's career through his later work on the ecclesiastical province of York, not acknowledging his longstanding earlier enthusiasm for genealogy and heraldry.

A volume titled The Antiquities of York City was published by Francis Hildyard in 1719 under Torre's name – quite spuriously, and apparently simply to take advantage of his antiquarian reputation.

== Sources ==
- Broadway, Jan (2004). "Torre, James (1649–1699)". Oxford Dictionary of National Biography (online ed.). Oxford University Press. doi:10.1093/ref:odnb/27561. (Subscription or UK public library membership required.)
- Carpenter, David X. (2010). "James Torre's collection of Yorkshire monastic charters" (PDF). Monastic Research Bulletin. 16: 2–24.
- Crouch, David, ed. (2022). The Metham Family Cartulary: Reconstructed from Antiquarian Transcripts. Yorkshire Archaeological and Historical Society Record Series. Vol. 167. Leeds: Yorkshire Archaeological and Historical Society. ISBN 9781916506633.
- Drake, Francis (1736). "Preface [unpaginated]". Eboracum or the History and Antiquities of the City of York. Vol. 1. London.
- Hunter, Joseph, ed. (1830). The Diary of Ralph Thoresby. London.
- Stonehouse, W. B. (1839). The History and Topography of the Isle of Axholme. London.
