= Henry Keep =

Henry Keep may refer to:

- Henry Keep (American football) (1872–1965), American football coach
- Henry Keep (businessman) (1818–1869), American financier
- Henry Keep (politician) (1863–1897), Australian politician

== See also ==
- Henry Keepe (1652–1688), English antiquarian
