= Newland with Woodhouse Moor =

Civil parish in West Yorkshire, England

Coordinates: 53.697°N 1.440°W

- Civil parish
- Location within West Yorkshire
- Population: 0
- OS grid reference: SE369224
- Civil parish: Newland with Woodhouse Moor
- Metropolitan borough: City of Wakefield
- Metropolitan county: West Yorkshire
- Region: Yorkshire and the Humber
- Country: England
- Sovereign state: United Kingdom
- Post town: NORMANTON
- Postcode district: WF6
- Police: West Yorkshire
- Fire: West Yorkshire
- Ambulance: Yorkshire
- UK Parliament: Normanton

Newland with Woodhouse Moor is a civil parish in the City of Wakefield in West Yorkshire, England, consisting of some open countryside west of Normanton, including Newland Hall.

The records of the Newlands estate go back 900 years, and indicate that it was established in 1213 by King John I as a community of the Knights Templar, and subsequently fell to the Knights Hospitaller, who maintained a preceptory there. Newland was only one of two preceptories in West Yorkshire, the other being that of the Knights Templar at Temple Newsam, and the only one established by the Knights Hospitaller.

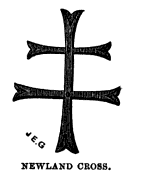
'Double cross' shield of Knights Hospitaller which appeared on the buildings at Newland preceptory

Early in its history, the preceptory was the beneficiary of the largesse of a powerful patron, Roger Le Peytevin, lord of the manor of nearby Altofts. Later, the longtime lords of the manor were the Levett family, who also had ties to nearby Normanton as well as to the chivalric order. On 2 October 1447, William Lyvett (Levett) was admitted tenant to the Knights Hospitaller at Newland and preceptor of the Hospitallers' community there.

At the time of the Dissolution of the Monasteries, King Henry VIII dissolved the Newland preceptory and confiscated the property. It was subsequently sold to a member of the Bunny family of Newton. Later, the Silvester family purchased the estate, and in 1740 built Newland Hall as its principal residence. The 54-room Hall was demolished in 1917. The farm buildings belonging to the former Newland Hall are Grade II listed buildings, as is the old stable block associated with the property, and which once carried the cross of the Knights Hospitaller.

The 2001 census recorded a population of zero for the parish, which was once an extra-parochial area.

As of a 2011 survey created by the British government, the parish now reports inhabitants.

In recent times part of the estate has been used for events such as concerts and field sports by the brand Hook and Gun.

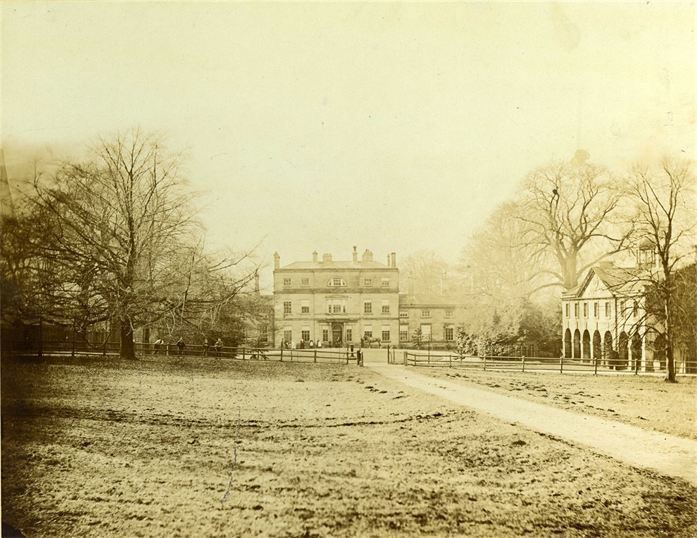
Newland Hall, built ca. 1740, demolished 1917.

Historical population
Year	Pop.	±%
1861	78	—
1871	46	−41.0%
1881	49	+6.5%
1891	57	+16.3%
1901	40	−29.8%
1911	37	−7.5%
1921	38	+2.7%
1931	41	+7.9%
1971	9	−78.0%
