= William Drake (antiquary) =

English antiquary and philologist (1723–1801)

The Reverend William Drake
- Vicar of Isleworth
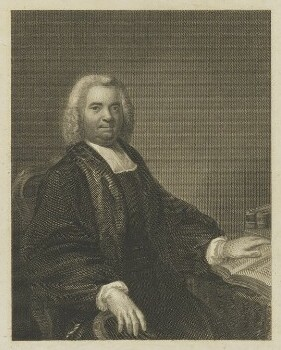
- Line engraving by William Bromley

Personal details
- Baptised: 10 January 1723
- Died: 13 May 1801 (aged 78) Isleworth, Middlesex
- Denomination: Anglican
- Education: Christ Church, Oxford

William Drake (bapt. 1723 – 1801) was an Anglican priest, antiquary and philologist.

== Life ==
William Drake, second surviving son of Francis Drake, historian, by his wife Mary, third daughter of George Woodyear of Crook Hill, near Doncaster, was baptised at St. Michael-le-Belfry, York, on 10 January 1723. He matriculated at Christ Church, Oxford, on 21 March 1740–1, proceeded BA on 19 October 1744, and took orders. For a few years he was third master of Westminster School. In 1750 he was appointed master of Felstead grammar school, Essex, and rector of Layer Marney in the same county on 1 December 1764. He continued to hold both appointments until 1777, when he was presented to the vicarage of Isleworth, Middlesex. He died at Isleworth on 13 May 1801.

== Works ==
Drake, who had been elected a fellow of the Society of Antiquaries on 29 March 1770, contributed the following papers to Archæologia: "Letter on the Origin of the word Romance", iv. 142–8; "Observations on two Roman Stations in the county of Essex", v. 137–42; "Letter on the Origin of the English Language", v. 306–17; "Further Remarks on the Origin of the English Language", v. 379–89; "Account of some Discoveries in the Church of Brotherton in the county of York", ix. 253–67; "Observations on the Derivation of the English Language", ix. 332–61.

== Sources ==
- Aungier, George James (1840). The History and Antiquities of Syon Monastery, the Parish of Isleworth, and the Chapelry of Hounslow. London: J. B. Nichols and Son. pp. 145, 161, 183.
- Davies, Robert (1875). "A Memoir of Francis Drake, of York, F.S.A., F.R.S.". Yorkshire Archæological and Topographical Journal. Vol. 3. London: Bradbury, Agnew, and Co. pp. 33–54.
- Goodwin, Gordon; Marchand, J. A. (2004). "Drake, William (bap. 1723, d. 1801), antiquary and philologist". Oxford Dictionary of National Biography. Oxford University Press. Retrieved 8 September 2022.
- Lysons, Daniel (1792). The Environs of London. Vol. 3. London: T. Cadell, jun. and W. Davies. p. 108.
- Morant, Philip (1768). The History and Antiquities of the County of Essex. 2 vols. London: T. Osborne; J. Whiston; S. Baker; L. Davis; C. Reymers; B. White. Vol. 1. p. 409., Vol. 2, p. 421.
- Nichols, John (1812). Literary Anecdotes of the Eighteenth Century. Vol. 2. London: Nichols, Son, and Bentley. p. 87 n.
- Nichols, John (1822). Illustrations of the Literary History of the Eighteenth Century. Vol. 4. John Nichols and Son. p. 620.
- The Gentleman's Magazine. Vol. 20. 1750. p. 237.
- The Gentleman's Magazine. Vol. 71, Part 1. 1801. p. 574.

Attribution

- This article incorporates text from a publication now in the public domain: Goodwin, Gordon (1888). "Drake, William". In Stephen, Leslie (ed.). Dictionary of National Biography. Vol. 15. London: Smith, Elder & Co. p. 450.
