= Benjamin Langwith =

English antiquarian

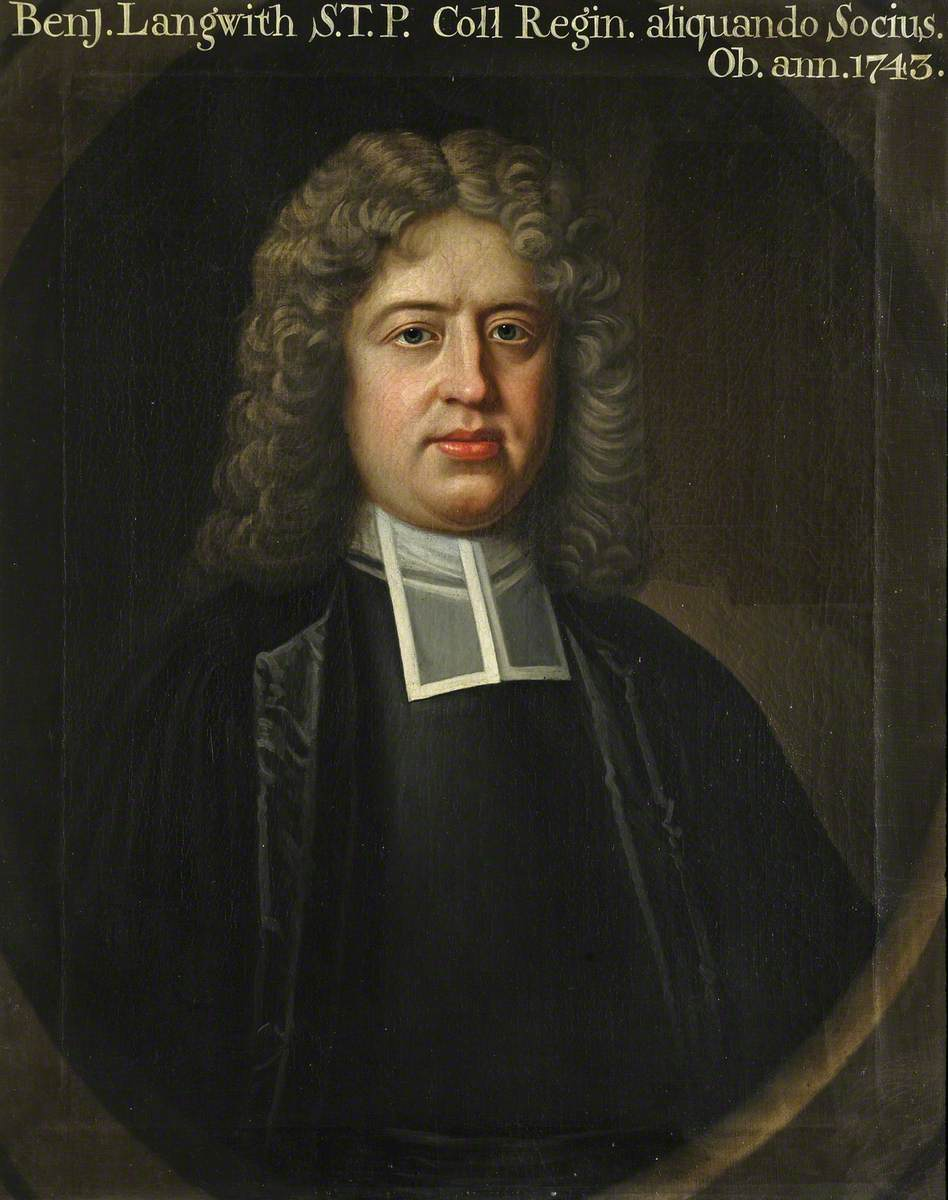
- Born: c. 1684
- Died: 2 October 1743
- Occupation: Antiquarian

Benjamin Langwith (1684? – 2 October 1743) was an English antiquarian and natural philosopher.

== Biography ==
Langwith was a Yorkshireman, born about 1684. He was educated at Queens' College, Cambridge, and elected fellow and tutor (Cooper, Memorials of Cambridge, i. 314). He graduated B.A. in 1704, M.A. in 1708, B.D. in 1716, and D.D. in 1717 (Cantabr. Graduati, 1787, p. 233). Thoresby placed his son under his care, but was obliged to remove him, owing to Langwith's negligence (Letters addressed to R. Thoresby, ii. 322–3, 881–2). He was instituted to the rectory of Petworth, Sussex, in 1718 (Dallaway, Rape of Arundel, ed. Cartwright, p. 335), and was made prebendary of Chichester on 15 June 1725 (Le Neve, Fasti, ed. Hardy, i. 273). He was buried at Petworth on 2 October 1743, aged 59. His widow, Sarah, died on 8 February 1784, aged 91, and was buried in Westminster Abbey (Registers, ed. Chester, p. 437).

Langwith gave Francis Drake some assistance in the preparation of his 'Eboracum.' His scientific attainments were considerable. Four of his dissertations were inserted in the 'Philosophical Transactions.' He wrote also 'Observations on Dr. Arbuthnot's Dissertations on Coins, Weights, and Measures,' 4to, London, 1747, edited by his widow. It was reissued in the second edition of Arbuthnot's ‘Tables of Ancient Coins,’ &c., 4to, 1754.
