= William Henry Dixon (priest) =

Church of England clergyman and antiquarian

The Reverend Canon William Henry Dixon
- Canon-residentiary of York

Orders
- Ordination: 1807

Personal details
- Born: 2 November 1783 Wadworth, Yorkshire, England
- Died: February 1854 (aged 70) York, Yorkshire, England
- Denomination: Anglican

William Henry Dixon (2 November 1783 – February 1854) was a Church of England clergyman and antiquary. He has strong connections to York.

== Life ==
William Henry Dixon, son of the Rev. Henry Dixon, vicar of Wadworth in the deanery of Doncaster, was born at that place on 2 November 1783. His mother was half-sister to the poet William Mason, whose estates came into his possession, together with various manuscripts by Mason and Thomas Gray, some of which were afterwards preserved in the York Minster Library.

Dixon attended the grammar schools of Worsborough and Houghton-le-Spring, and in 1801 matriculated at Pembroke College, Cambridge. In January 1805 he graduated BA, proceeding MA in 1809, and in 1807 entered into orders. His first curacy was at Tickhill, and he successively held the benefices of Mappleton, Wistow, Cawood, Topcliffe, and Sutton-on-the-Forest. He became prebendary of Weighton in 1825, canon-residentiary of York in 1831, canon of Ripon in 1836, rector of Etton, and vicar of Bishopthorpe. He also acted as domestic chaplain to two archbishops of York.

Dixon died at York in February 1854. According to the Dictionary of National Biography, "In all his offices he worthily did his duty, and endeared himself to his acquaintance. He had ample means, which he spent without stint, and he left memorials of his munificence in nearly all the parishes named."

== Works ==
Dixon was elected a fellow of the Society of Antiquaries on 31 May 1821. In 1839 he published two occasional sermons, and in 1848 wrote Synodus Eboracensis; or a short account of the Convocation of the Province of York, with reference to the recent charge of Archdeacon Wilberforce, 8vo. For many years he worked assiduously in extending and shaping James Torre's manuscript annals of the members of the cathedral of York. On the death of Dixon the publication of his Fasti was projected as a memorial of the author, and the manuscript was placed in the hands of the Rev. James Raine, who, after spending nearly ten years in further researches, published a first volume of Fasti Eboracenses; Lives of the Archbishops of York (1863, 8vo), which includes the first forty-four primates of the northern province, ending with John de Thoresby, 1373. This work is almost wholly written by Canon Raine, the materials left by Dixon being inadequate. The remainder of the work, for which Dixon's manuscript collections are more full, had not been published in 1888. A short memoir of Dixon was privately printed by his nephew, the Rev. C. B. Norcliffe, 8vo, York, 1860.

== Sources ==
- Sutton, C. W.; Curthoys, M. C. (2004). "Dixon, William Henry (1783–1854)". Oxford Dictionary of National Biography. Oxford University Press. Retrieved 8 September 2022.
- "The Rev William Henry Dixon 1783-1854". Tickhill History Society. Retrieved 8 September 2022.

Attribution:

- This article incorporates text from a publication now in the public domain: Sutton, Charles William (1888). "Dixon, William Henry". In Stephen, Leslie (ed.). Dictionary of National Biography. Vol. 15. London: Smith, Elder & Co. pp. 127–128.
