= Outwood Academy Freeston =

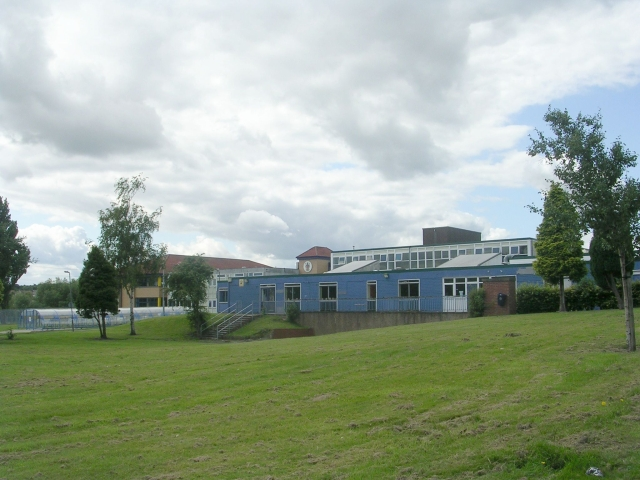
- Freeston College in 2009, viewed from Snydale Road

Location
- Favell Avenue; Normanton, West Yorkshire, WF6 1HZ; England; 53.69528434708006°N 1.4123782517282983°W

Information
- Type: Academy
- Motto: Students first
- Established: 1592; 434 years ago
- Local authority: Wakefield
- Department for Education URN: 145937 Tables
- Principal: Lisa Allott
- Gender: Mixed
- Age: 11 to 16
- Enrollment: 1061
- Publication: The Freeston Academy
- Website: freeston.outwood.com

Outwood Academy Freeston (known locally as Freeston), formerly The Freeston Academy, is a state run, coeducational high school situated in Normanton, West Yorkshire, near the city of Wakefield. It is a Business and Enterprise specialist school.

The school is operated by Outwood Grange Academies Trust, and the current principal is Lisa Allott.

== History ==
The school's history dates back to the late 1500s, when Normanton Grammar School was founded and endowed by John Freeston of Altofts, a local barrister. The school was later moved to its current location in the 1950s, where only a chimney remains in the original location. In 1977 Normanton Secondary Modern School was merged with Normanton Grammar School to form Normanton Freeston Comprehensive School at the site of the Modern school.

Along with a number of other secondary schools, Freeston changed itself to an academy status in 2011. Its school motto was "Making the Difference in the Business of Learning".

On 20 August 2015 the academy library and ICT lab caught fire and burnt down as a result of maintenance work being carried out on the roof.

On 8 September 2017 Wakefield City Academies Trust announced it was disbanding.

On 30 January 2018 Outwood Grange Academies Trust was named as the new sponsor for The Freeston Academy. The school transferred to its new sponsor on 1 June 2018, reopening as Outwood Academy Freeston.

== Academics ==
The last Ofsted report in September 2017 concluded that Freeston provides a sound education for its students, supported by a strong governing body and providing support for students and parents alike. The school has Enterprise Hub Status and works with nine West Yorkshire schools.
