= William Dickson =

William Dickson may refer to:

- William Dickson (Australian politician) (1893–1966), member of the Legislative Council of New South Wales
- William Dickson (bishop) (1745–1804), bishop of Down and Connor, 1784–1804
- William Dickson (MP) (1748–1815) British Army commander and member of parliament
- William Dickson (congressman) (1770–1816), American congressman from Tennessee
- William Dickson (Falklands settler) (died 1833), administrator of Fort Louis in the Falklands in 1833
- William Dickson (footballer, born 1866) (1866–1910), Scottish footballer
- William Dickson (footballer, born 1923) (1923–2002), Northern Irish footballer
- William Dickson (Northern Ireland politician) (born 1947), Northern Irish councillor and shooting survivor
- William Dickson (Nova Scotia politician) (1779–1834), politician in Nova Scotia
- William Dickson (RAF officer) (1898–1987), British Chief of the Air Staff, 1953–1956
- William Dickson (Upper Canada) (1769–1846), lawyer, businessman and political figure in Upper Canada
- William Dickson (solicitor) (1799–1875), solicitor, banker and historian associated with Alnwick, Northumberland, England
- William A. Dickson (1861–1940), U.S. representative
- William Kennedy Dickson (1860–1935), Franco-Scottish inventor and film pioneer
- William Kirk Dickson (1860–1949), Scottish advocate, librarian and writer
- William Purdie Dickson (1823–1901), Scottish professor of divinity
- William Steel Dickson (1744–1824), Ulster Presbyterian minister and member of the Society of the United Irishmen
- William Dickson (chemist) (1905–1992), Scottish chemist and educator
- William Angus Dickson (1882–1967), Canadian politician in the Legislative Assembly of Ontario
- William B. Dickson (1865–1942), business executive in the American steel industry
- William M. Dickson (1827–1889), lawyer and judge from Cincinnati, Ohio
- Billy Dickson, American cinematographer and television director
- Billy Dickson (footballer) (born 1945), Scottish footballer
- Will Dickson (born 2004), English footballer

== See also ==
- William Dixon (disambiguation)
- William Dixson (1870–1952), Australian businessman and benefactor
