= Listed buildings in Normanton, West Yorkshire =

Normanton is a former civil parish in the metropolitan borough of the City of Wakefield, West Yorkshire, England. The parish contained 13 listed buildings that are recorded in the National Heritage List for England. Of these, one is listed at Grade I, the highest of the three grades, one is at Grade II*, the middle grade, and the others are at Grade II, the lowest grade. The parish contained the town of Normanton and the surrounding area. The Calder Cut of the Aire and Calder Navigation and the River Calder pass through the parish, and the listed buildings associated with them are an aqueduct, three locks, and two railway viaducts. The other listed buildings consist of a church, a chest tomb in the churchyard, the stump of a former market cross surmounted by a lamp post, and three houses and an associated structure.

== Key ==
Grade	Criteria
I	Buildings of exceptional interest, sometimes considered to be internationally important
II*	Particularly important buildings of more than special interest
II	Buildings of national importance and special interest

== Buildings ==
Name and location	Photograph	Date	Notes	Grade
All Saints' Church; 53.69788°N 1.41488°W		13th century	The church dates mainly from the 14th and 15th centuries, and there was a series of rebuilds and restorations in the 19th and early 20th centuries. It is built in sandstone with a stone slate roof, and is in Perpendicular style. The church consists of a nave with a clerestory, north and south aisles, a south porch, a chancel with a south chapel, and a west tower. The tower has three stages, diagonal buttresses, a three-light west window with a hood mould, above which is an ogee-headed niche with a carved angel below and crocketed pinnacles above. On each front is a lock face, above are two-light belfry openings, a corbel table, and an embattled parapet with crocketed corner pinnacles.	II*
Cross and signpost 53.69982°N 1.41525°W	—	Medieval (probable)	The base is the stump of a former market cross in sandstone with a square section, and it is about 1 metre (3 ft 3 in) high. Attached to its top is a cast iron lamp post, originally a signpost. The clasping socket has a moulded cap surmounted by four dolphins. On three sides at the top of the lamp post are arms with scrolled wrought iron brackets, and it is surmounted by a lamp.	II
Hanson House Farm; 53.69749°N 1.41320°W	—	16th century (or earlier)	A farmhouse, later divided into two private houses, with two main builds. The earlier build is in timber framing and sandstone, the later, dating from the 18th century, is in sandstone with some brick, and the roof to both parts is in stone slate with coped gables. There are two storeys, and a T-shaped plan, the later part with three bays and a rear wing, and the older part continuing from the rear wing. The front is symmetrical with a band, a central doorway with an architrave, a fanlight, and a cornice, the windows are sashes with moulded sills and architraves, and there is a French window. Elsewhere, the windows are casements, or have been altered.	II
Store south of Hanson House Farmhouse; 53.69743°N 1.41298°W	—	16th century (or earlier)	A barn or granary later used as a store, it is in sandstone, with some internal timber framing, and a stone slate roof with coped gables and kneelers. There are two storeys and three bays. It contains a wagon entrance with a chamfered surround and a four-centred arch, a doorway with a massive lintel, an inserted window, and an upper floor doorway converted into a window.	II
The Manor House; 53.69914°N 1.41454°W	—	1629	A farmhouse, later a private house, it has been altered, it is in sandstone, mostly rendered, and has a stone slate roof. There are two storeys and an L-shaped plan, with a two-bay range, a large one-bay wing, and a two-storey porch in the angle. Some windows are small, some are rectangular, some are mullioned, and others have been altered.	II
Hill House Farmhouse; 53.69059°N 1.42271°W	—	17th century (or earlier)	The farmhouse, later a private house, has a timber framed core, partly encased, and partly replaced by sandstone and some brick, and with a slate roof. There are two storeys, three bays, and a rear service wing. The doorway has the remains of a Tudor arched lintel. To the left is a loop window, to the right a mullioned window, and the other windows are casements. The left gable end has exposed close studded timber framing. Inside, there is more exposed timber framing and an inglenook with a decorated bressummer.	II
Tomb chest 53.69775°N 1.41471°W	—	c. 1740	The tomb chest is in the churchyard of All Saints' Church, and is to the memory of members of the White family. It is in sandstone, and has fielded panel sides with rusticated quoins, a rectangular lid with a moulded edge, and an inscription.	II
Stanley Ferry Aqueduct; 53.70249°N 1.46221°W		1837–39	The aqueduct carries the Calder Cut of the Aire and Calder Navigation over the River Calder. It is in cast iron with stone abutments, and is of arched suspension construction. There are two iron girders with a horizontal tie at the apex, and steel suspension rods. The trough is 160 feet (49 m) long and 24 feet (7.3 m) wide, and is flanked by a continuous colonnade of fluted Greek Doric colonnettes with an entablature including triglyphs with guttae and mutules. Each abutment has a Classical pedimented portico.	I
Birkwood Lock; 53.71167°N 1.45637°W		1839	The lock on the Calder Cut of the Aire and Calder Navigation is in sandstone, with some repairs in concrete. There are quadrantally curved entrances at each end, and upper, intermediate and lower wooden gates. From the northwest corner is an overflow sluice.	II
Kings Lock; 53.71520°N 1.43511°W		1839	The lock on the Calder Cut of the Aire and Calder Navigation is in sandstone, with some repairs in concrete. There are quadrantally curved entrances at each end, and upper, intermediate and lower wooden gates. From the northwest corner is an overflow sluice.	II
Wood Nook Lock; 53.72143°N 1.40728°W		1839	The lock on the Calder Cut of the Aire and Calder Navigation is in sandstone, with some repairs in concrete. There is a quadrantally curved upper entrance, and the lower entrance meets the River Calder at an angle, with a bullnose on the outer side. The upper and lower gates are in wood.	II
Railway viaduct over the Aire and Calder Navigation; 53.71875°N 1.40650°W		1840	The viaduct was built by the North Midland Railway to carry its line over the Calder Cut of the Aire and Calder Navigation. The viaduct is in sandstone and consists of a single segmental arch, and at each outer end are two round-headed arches to the embankment. The viaduct has stepped voussoirs, a moulded band, a parapet, and rectangular piers at each end.	II
Railway viaduct over the River Calder; 53.72090°N 1.40455°W		1840	The viaduct was built by the North Midland Railway to carry its line over the River Calder. It is in sandstone with brick soffits, and consists of five semicircular arches. The viaduct has stepped rusticated voussoirs, a moulded band, and a parapet. The two piers in the river have convex cutwaters.	II
