= Listed buildings in Warmfield cum Heath =

Warmfield cum Heath is a civil parish in the metropolitan borough of the City of Wakefield, West Yorkshire, England. The parish contains 57 listed buildings that are recorded in the National Heritage List for England. Of these, six are listed at Grade I, the highest of the three grades, six are at Grade II*, the middle grade, and the others are at Grade II, the lowest grade. The parish contains the settlements of Warmfield, Heath, Kirkthorpe, Goosehill, and the surrounding countryside. The major building in the parish is Heath Hall, a country house, which is listed together with associated buildings and structures. Most of the other listed buildings are houses, cottages and associated structures. The rest of the listed buildings include a church and a group of grave slabs in the churchyard, a block of former almshouses, a water tower, farmhouses and farm buildings, a public house, former schools and a master's house, a set of stocks, two well covers, a boathouse, a weir and sluice gates on the River Calder, and a telephone kiosk.

== Key ==
Grade	Criteria
I	Buildings of exceptional interest, sometimes considered to be internationally important
II*	Particularly important buildings of more than special interest
II	Buildings of national importance and special interest

== Buildings ==
Name and location	Photograph	Date	Notes	Grade
St Peter's Church, Kirkthorpe; 53.68402°N 1.45432°W		14th century	The oldest part of the church is the tower, the rest of the church, which was largely rebuilt in 1850–51, is Perpendicular in style. It is built in stone with a stone slate roof, and consists of a nave, a north aisle, a south porch, a chancel with a north chapel, and a west tower. The tower has two stages, diagonal buttresses, a west window, and a northeast stair turret. At the top are corner gargoyles, and an embattled parapet with crocketed pinnacles.	II*
Sycamore Cottage; 53.68373°N 1.45505°W		Mid 16th century	A timber framed house that was extended and encased in stone in about 1690. It has quoins, a stone slate roof, two storeys, four bays, and a lean-to on the left. The doorways and the ground floor windows have monolithic lintels.	II
Old Hall Cottages; 53.67691°N 1.46861°W	—	Late 16th century	A farm building associated with Heath Old Hall, later altered and converted into three cottages. The cottages are in gritstone, with a continuous hood mould, and a stone slate roof with coped gables, kneelers and finials. There are two storeys and five bays. In the ground floor are inserted doorways and windows, and the upper floor contains windows with pointed-arched heads. At the rear is an original Tudor arched doorway, and in the right return is a three-light mullioned window.	II
Frieston's Hospital; 53.68333°N 1.45531°W		1595	A block of almshouses, later a private dwelling, the building is in gritstone, with a chamfered eaves band, and a stone slate roof. It consists of a square hall, with aisles on three sides under lean-to roofs, surmounted on the three aisled sides by dormers with coped gables and finials. The doorway has a chamfered surround and composite jambs, the windows in the dormers are mullioned and transomed, and elsewhere they are mullioned.	I
King's Arms Cottages; 53.67489°N 1.46221°W		Early 17th century	A row of cottages later altered and combined, the building is in stone with quoins, partly in brick at the rear, with a timber framed arcade to an outshut, and a stone slate roof. There are two storeys, three bays, a single-storey outshut at the rear, and an added brick bay to the right. In the left two bays are paired doorways with deep lintels, and the windows are sliding sashes. The right bay contains a doorway with tie-stone jambs and a dated and initialled shallow-arched lintel, and three-light mullioned windows.	II
Dame Mary Bolle's Water Tower; 53.67510°N 1.46860°W		Mid 17th century	The tower is built over a water spring, and is in gritstone, with quoins, bands, and a pyramidal stone slate roof. There are five stages and a square plan. In the west face is a plinth broken by a Tudor arched doorway with a chamfered surround and composite jambs, the right jamb is dated, and there is a similar doorway in the east face. Elsewhere, there are windows and vents. Below the west entrance are the remains of a cast iron waterwheel and an overflow channel.	II*
Barn and outbuildings, Heath Hall Farm; 53.67821°N 1.46202°W		17th century	The farm buildings, which were later extended, are in stone with some brick, and the roofs are in stone and stone slate. There are two storeys, and the buildings form a U-shaped plan. The barn has two ranges of seven and one of nine bays, the outbuildings incorporate a dovecote, and part of the barn has been converted for residential use. The openings include cart entries, doorways, windows, and vents, and there are external steps leading to upper floor doorways.	II
Heath House; 53.67661°N 1.46592°W		Mid 17th century	A county house, it was extended and refronted in 1744–45 by James Paine. The house is in stone on a plinth, the basement is rusticated, it has a hipped roof of Welsh slate and lead, and the front is in Palladian style. There are two storeys, attics and cellars, and a front of five bays. Flanking the middle three bays are attached giant Ionic columns carrying a pediment, and on the corners are paired pilasters. In the centre of the basement is a round-arched doorway and to the left is a later bay window, In the ground floor, the middle window has a segmental pediment on consoles, and the windows in the outer bays have architraves and triangular pediments. At the rear are projecting cross-wings and the windows have been altered to sashes.	II*
Wall and gate pier, Heath House; 53.67640°N 1.46592°W		Mid 17th century (probable)	The wall is in stone with an inner lining of brick, and is attached to the southwest of the house. It has stone coping, and is ramped down away from the house. The wall ends in a stone gate pier that has a projecting band, and a moulded cornice.	II
The Priest's House; 53.67622°N 1.46596°W		Mid to late 17th century	The house is in rendered stone with a stone slate roof. There are two storeys, a double-depth plan, and two bays. The central doorway has a chamfered surround, and a Tudor arched lintel with sunk spandrels. The windows have been altered, and there is a continuous hood mould above the ground floor openings, stepped over the doorway.	II
Kings Arms; 53.67474°N 1.46202°W		c. 1660	The public house was created in about 1841, with the combination of older cottages and an 18th-century barn or coach house. It is in stone with quoins, brick at the rear, and a stone slate roof with coped gables and kneelers. The former cottages to the right have two storeys and three bays, and contain a doorway with a chamfered surround, composite jambs, and a basket-arched lintel, and sash windows. The former barn to the left has three bays, the middle bay gabled, and containing a former segmental-arched cart entry with a pitching hole above. At the rear is a doorway with a chamfered surround, composite jambs, and a Tudor arched lintel.	II
The Old School House; 53.67563°N 1.45962°W		c. 1660	The master's house was added in about 1761, and the building has since been converted into a private house. It is in gritstone with quoins and a stone slate roof. The school has a single storey and three bays. In the centre is a doorway with a chamfered surround, double tie-stone jambs, and a Tudor arched lintel, flanked by mullioned and transomed windows. The master's house has two storeys, and contains a doorway and windows with monolithic lintels.	II
Marsh Close; 53.67582°N 1.45989°W		1665	A stone house with a continuous hood mould stepped over the doorway, and a Welsh blue slate roof. There are two storeys and three bays. The doorway has a chamfered surround, composite jambs, and a dated and initialled lintel with a depressed Tudor arch and spandrels. The windows on the front have double-chamfered surrounds. At the rear is a doorway with monolithic jambs, and a mullioned window.	II
Little Sycamore, Sycamore House and Sycamore Cottage; 53.67522°N 1.46327°W		Late 17th century	A row of three cottages in stone and orange-red brick, with quoins, stone slate roofs, and two storeys. Little Sycamore, on the left, has a rear wing, two bays, a doorway with a monolithic lintel, and mullioned windows. In the centre, Sycamore House has two bays, a central doorway with an architrave, a fanlight, a frieze, and a cornice, and a trellised porch. Flanking it are two-storey bay windows, with four-light mullioned windows. Sycamore Cottage on the right has two bays and a rear outshut, and it contains a doorway with a chamfered surround and tie-stone jambs.	II
Heath Hall; 53.67691°N 1.46308°W		c. 1709	A large country house, it was remodelled by John Carr in 1754–80, and additions were made in 1837–45 by Anthony Salvin. The house is in stone and has two storeys, attics and cellars, and a symmetrical front of eleven bays. In the middle are four giant Ionic columns carrying a pediment containing an achievement in the tympanum. The central doorway has a porch with consoles and an open pediment. The windows in the middle five bays have architraves and cornices, and the three outer bays at each end are canted. These bays have balustraded parapets, as do the attics. At the rear the middle three bays project and have quoins, and there is a central doorway with a cornice on consoles. Attached on the left is a single-storey former billiards room.	I
1 and 2 Horse Race End; 53.67071°N 1.45569°W	—	Early 18th century	A pair of mirror-image cottages in gritstone, No. 1 has a stone slate roof, No. 2 has a pantile roof, the gables are coped, and on the right are kneelers. There are two storeys, each cottage has two bays, and at the rear is a later lean-to brick outshut. The doorways in the outer bays have chamfered surrounds, composite jambs, and lintels with depressed Tudor arches. The windows have plain surrounds.	II
Briar and Vine Cottage; 53.67577°N 1.46049°W		Early 18th century	A pair of cottages, later combined, in stone, with a roof of stone slate and pantile. There are two storeys, two bays, and a single-storey rear outshut. The windows are casements, and one of the original doors has been blocked.	II
Stable and barn, Heath Hall; 53.67763°N 1.46366°W		Early 18th century} (probable)	The stable and barn are in stone and brick, with quoins, and a hipped stone slate roof. There are two storeys, and a long range of nine bays. The openings include doorways with monolithic jambs, segmental-arched cart entrances, one with a chamfered surround, composite jambs, and voussoirs, and square windows.	II*
Cartshed and granary, Heath Hall Farm; 53.67784°N 1.46197°W	—	Early 18th century	The cartshed with a granary above is in stone with quoins, and a stone slate roof with coped gables and kneelers. There are two storeys and five bays. On the front are paired basket-arched cart entries with composite jambs and voussoirs. In the left return is a two-light mullioned window, and in the right return is an upper floor doorway with composite jambs.	II
The Blacksmith's Cottage; 53.67493°N 1.46390°W		Early 18th century	The house, which was extended to the rear in the 19th century, is in stone with quoins, and a stone slate roof with coped gables and kneelers. There are two storeys, two bays, a rear extension, and an outshut on the left. The doorway has a chamfered surround, composite jambs, and a segmental-arched lintel, and the windows have been altered.	II
Beech Lawn; 53.67516°N 1.45937°W		Early to mid 18th century	A house that was extended in the 19th and 20th centuries, it is in stone with some brick, and hipped stone slate roofs. There are two storeys, attics in the rear wing, a front of three bays with wing extensions, and a rear range of three bays. The front has a plinth and a band, and a central doorway with an architrave, a pulvinated frieze, and a triangular pediment. Flanking it are two-storey canted bay windows, and there are single-storey bay windows in the outer bays. Most of the other windows are sashes. At the rear is a doorway with monolithic jambs, and a conservatory.	II
Deershed, Heath Hall; 53.67976°N 1.46109°W		Early to mid 18th century	The deer shelter in the grounds of the hall is in Palladian style. It is in stone on a plinth, with raised vermiculated quoins, a moulded cornice, and a hipped stone slate roof. There are two storeys and a symmetrical front of five bays, the middle three bays projecting under a pediment gable containing a round hole in the tympanum. In each bay is a semicircular-arched doorway with a moulded surround, an impost band, and a false vermiculated triple keystone. In the upper floor is a central blind Diocletian window, and the other windows are also blind.	II*
Gate piers, Marsh House; 53.67589°N 1.46022°W	—	Early to mid 18th century	The gate piers are set in a wall and are in stone. They are square, on a plinth, and each has a moulded cornice and a hollow chamfered cap.	II
Cobbler's Hall and Heath Post Office; 53.67505°N 1.46398°W		c.1740	Originally a school, later divided into dwellings, it is in stone with quoins, a band, and a hipped stone slate roof. There are two storeys and a symmetrical front of five bays. The central doorway has monolithic jambs, a fanlight, and a moulded cornice. The windows are sashes, and at the rear is a tall stair window.	II
The Dower House; 53.67609°N 1.46206°W		c.1740	The house, which was extended in the 19th century, is in stone on a chamfered plinth, with rusticated quoins, a moulded band, a moulded eaves cornice, and a hipped roof in Westmorland green slate. There are two storeys, fronts of five and four bays, and an added projecting bay on the left. The middle three bays project under a triangular pediment, and the central doorway has an architrave, a five-light fanlight, a pulvinated frieze, and a moulded cornice on carved consoles. The windows are sashes with architraves. At the rear is a central arched stair window with a keystone.	II*
Gate piers, gates and overthrow, Dower House; 53.67600°N 1.46178°W		Mid 18th century	The stone gate piers to the east of the house are square, on a plinth, with a rusticated base. Each pier has channelled stonework, pierced by an arched niche, with an impost, a false triple keystone, a cornice, a pulvinated frieze, and a moulded cornice surmounted by a wrought iron heart-shaped finial. The gates are in wrought iron, and above them is a decorative overthrow.	II
Ha-ha and gate piers, Dower House; 53.67591°N 1.46225°W		Mid 18th century	The ha-ha to the south of the house is in stone, and has spiked metal straps on the corners. The gate piers are in stone and have domed caps. Attached to the eastern piers is a short length of decorative wrought iron fence.	II
Sundial, Dower House; 53.67597°N 1.46219°W		Mid 18th century	The sundial in the lawn in front of the house is in stone. It has a square base, a carved console on each side, a frieze decorated with egg-and-dart ornament, and notched corners. On the top is a circular recess for a dial plate.	II
Ha-ha to the east of Heath Hall; 53.67744°N 1.46102°W	—	Mid 18th century	The ha-ha to the east of the hall has a serpentine shape. It is in stone and has rectangular square coping.	II
Ha-ha, Heath House; 53.67634°N 1.46540°W		Mid 18th century	The ha-ha is in stone with projecting coping, and has short sections of railings. It contains square gate piers that have tapering finials, and there are cast iron double gates.	II
Gate piers, gates and wall, Heath Old Hall; 53.67612°N 1.46600°W		18th century	The gate piers are in stone on a plinth, and each pier is rusticated with a Doric pilaster, an entablature, and a moulded cornice with a large pineapple finial. The flanking walls are coped and ramped up to the piers, and have large carved brackets, and the gates are in cast iron.	II
Stocks; 53.68312°N 1.45457°W		Mid 18th century (probable)	The stocks are by the roadside near a junction, and are in stone with a wooden seat and keepers. There are two roughly-squared piers with carved tops, rusticated panels on the outside, and deep rebates for the keepers inside. The keepers have four holes and a padlock, and to the rear are two smaller piers and a seat.	II
Well cover 53.68133°N 1.45516°W	—	18th century	The well cover has a wall containing an arched doorway with a wooden door. The wall is in stone with moulded coping.	II
Brewhouse and East Pavilion, Heath Hall; 53.67669°N 1.46265°W		c. 1753	Originally a brewhouse and laundry for the hall, later converted for residential use, the building was designed by John Carr. It is in stone on a plinth, with quoins, sill bands, and a hipped stone slate roof. There are two storeys and an H-shaped plan, with symmetrical fronts of seven and five bays. The middle three bays project, and contain a semicircular-arched entrance with a massive parabolic-arched vault, and a dentilled pedimented gable. On the roof is a clock tower with engaged Tuscan columns, circular recesses for clock faces with an arched cornice, and a circular open rotunda with a bell-shaped cap and a ball finial. In the outer bays are recessed archways, and the windows are sashes.	I
The West Pavilion, Heath Hall; 53.67720°N 1.46332°W	—	c. 1753	Originally stables with accommodation above and later converted for residential use, the building was designed by John Carr. It is in stone on a plinth, with quoins, sill bands, and a hipped stone slate roof. There are two storeys and an H-shaped plan, with symmetrical fronts of seven and five bays. The middle three bays project, and contain a semicircular-arched entrance with a massive parabolic-arched vault, and a dentilled pedimented gable. On the roof is a clock tower with engaged Tuscan columns, circular recesses for clock faces with an arched cornice, and a circular open rotunda with a bell-shaped cap and a ball finial and a weathervane. In the outer bays are recessed archways, and the windows are sashes.	I
The Stable House, Heath Hall; 53.67749°N 1.46336°W		c. 1754	The stables and flanking coach houses were designed by John Carr, and have been converted into dwellings and garages. The building is in stone with stone slate roofs. The stable block has two storeys, a U-shaped plan with a front of five bays, and links to the former coach houses. The main block is on a plinth, with quoins, impost and sill bands, a bracketed moulded eaves cornice, and a hipped roof. The middle and outer bays project, and contain archivolted arched recesses. The central doorway has an architrave and a triangular pediment, and the windows are sashes. The coach houses have pedimented gables, and contain archivolted carriage entrances, and the low linking walls have doorways with tie-stone jambs.	I
Ha-ha, gate piers and wall, Beech Lawn; 53.67492°N 1.45898°W		Mid to late 18th century	The ha-ha walls are in stone, with coping, and cast iron railings, and form a circular island three-quarters round the house. To the east and west are monolithic gate piers with pyramidal caps and the remains of railings. The garden is rectangular and enclosed on three sides by stone walls with ramped coping that contain two seats with segmental-arched hoods.	II
Heath Farm Cottage; 53.67677°N 1.46476°W		Mid to late 18th century	A house in stone with quoins and a stone slate roof. There are two storeys, and an L-shaped plan, consisting of a front range of two bays, a rear wing, and a bay beyond that. On the front is a doorway with monolithic jambs and a fanlight, and square sash windows. In the rear wing is a stair window, and in the further bay is a doorway with a chamfered surround, tie-stone jambs, and a flat-arched lintel.	II
Ha-ha and gate piers, Heath Hall; 53.67663°N 1.46361°W		Mid to late 18th century	The ha-ha and gate piers at the southwest entrance to the hall are in stone. The ha-ha is coped, and at the east end it has a quadrant curve connecting it to the ha-ha of the Dower House. There are two pairs of gate piers, they are drum-shaped, on circular plinths, and have banded stonework. Each pier has a Roman Doric frieze decorated with triglyphs and guttae, and a cornice surmounted by a cap with Greek-key ornament.	II
Wall to rear of Stable House, Heath Hall; 53.67760°N 1.46307°W	—	Mid to late 18th century	The garden wall is in orange-red brick with stone coping. The wall is thick, it extends for about 100 metres (330 ft), and contains flues and a metal control. In the wall is a doorway with a flat arch.	II
Wall, cottage and shelters, Heath Hall Farm; 53.67853°N 1.46250°W		Mid to late 18th century	The wall encloses the walled garden on three sides, it is in stone with chamfered coping and buttressed piers. The gardener's cottage has quoins, an impost and a sill band, and a coped gable. There are two storeys and two bays. In the ground floor are two semicircular-arched doorways separated by a rusticated pier, and above are two Diocletian windows, and a blind oculus in the gable apex. The cart sheds or cattle shelters are in stone and brick, with roofs of stone slate and asbestos, and have 13 bays separated by square piers.	II
Walls and gate piers, west front of Heath Hall; 53.67668°N 1.46290°W	—	c. 1767	The screen walls extend from the west front of the hall to the East and West Pavilions. The walls are in stone and are coped, and surmounted by ball finials. The gate piers are square and rusticated on plinths. Beside each larger pier is a smaller pier with a ball finial. Each larger pier has a band, a frieze with a moulded recess containing a circle, and a cornice with an urn in Bath stone, decorated with fleurons.	I
Boat house, Half Moon Lake; 53.68257°N 1.45895°W		Late 18th century (probable)	The boat house is in stone, and has an entrance with a pointed arch and a keystone. Flanking the arch are low square piers with large projecting coping at the level of the impost band. The roof is vaulted.	II
Moorhouse; 53.67509°N 1.46158°W		Late 18th century	A house and cottage, later combined, the house dates from about 1800, and there is a 20th-century rear extension. The building is in stone, with roofs of stone slate and Welsh blue slate, and both parts have two storeys and sash windows. The house to the left has a moulded eaves cornice, a symmetrical front of three bays, and a double depth plan. The central doorway has an architrave, a fanlight, and a triangular pediment. The cottage is lower and has quoins, three bays, and a doorway with a plain surround. At the rear is a later single-storey wing.	II
The Whittling Well; 53.67250°N 1.46315°W		Late 18th century	The well head and cover are in stone. The cover consists of a semi-elliptical arch with voussoirs and a dropped keystone, and the trough has a canted front. It is flanked by short walls with banded rustication, and ends in low piers.	II
Kirkthorpe Hall; 53.68452°N 1.45423°W		c. 1780	A vicarage that was extended in about 1872, and later a private house, it is in stone, on a plinth, with quoins, and a hipped stone slate roof to the original part and a Welsh blue slate roof to the extension. There are two storeys, the original part has a symmetrical front of three bays, to the right is a single-storey three-bay extension, and beyond that is a recessed two-storey three-bay range. In the original part is a central doorway converted into a window that has monolithic jambs and a cornice on consoles, and the outer bays contain two-storey canted bay windows. To the right is an inserted doorway with pilasters, a frieze, a fanlight, and a cornice.	II
Boat Yard House; 53.67003°N 1.46787°W	—	c. 1800	An inn, later a private house, it is in stone with a stone slate roof. There are two storeys, a double-depth plan, two bays, and a rear outshut. The doorway has a monolithic lintel with a painted inscription, and the windows are casements with deep lintels and sills.	II
Gate piers, walls and railings, Newhall Lodge; 53.68958°N 1.43668°W	—	c. 1800	At the entrance to the drive are two pairs of stone gate piers, with a triangular pediment on each face. From these quadrant coped walls lead to similar piers. The railings and the gates are in cast iron with arrow-head finials.	II
Nine grave slabs 53.68404°N 1.45404°W		c. 1814	The nine grave tablets are in the churchyard of St Peter's Church, to the east of the church. They are to the memory of Benedictine nuns who lived at Heath Old Hall. The tablets are in stone, they are rectangular with curved corners, and have inscriptions and carved Maltese crosses.	II
Cross Hills Farmhouse; 53.68546°N 1.43650°W	—	Early 19th century	The farmhouse is in orange-red brick with stone at the rear, and a stone slate roof. There are two storeys, three bays, and a rear outshut. The doorways and the windows, which are sashes, have segmental-arched heads.	II
Kirkthorpe Weir and sluice gates 53.68654°N 1.45961°W		Early 19th century (probable)	The weir across the River Calder is in stone, it forms a segmental curve, and has curved retaining walls and steps. The sluice is in cast iron, and dated 1827. There are three sluices divided by six giant buttresses, with pointed-arched cutwaters to the south. The two original sluice gates have circular winding gear and a large cog wheel.	II
The Keepers; 53.67981°N 1.45504°W		Early 19th century (probable)	A keeper's cottage, later a private house, it is in stone with oversailing eaves and a hipped stone slate roof. There is a single storey, and fronts of three and two bays. The doorway and windows have semicircular-arched heads.	II
The Kennels at the Keepers; 53.67975°N 1.45476°W	—	Early 19th century	The kennels are in stone with a stone slate roof and a single storey. They contain doorways, some with semicircular-arched heads, and others with monolithic lintels.	II
Stable Block, Beech Lawn; 53.67558°N 1.45931°W	—	c. 1830	The stable block to the north of the house is in stone with quoins and a stone slate roof. There are two storeys, four bays, a lower bay to the right, and a later bay beyond that. The openings include doorways with voussoirs and fanlights, windows, some with sashes and others fixed, and external steps leading to an upper floor doorway with a monolithic lintel.	II
Newhall Lodge; 53.68961°N 1.43697°W		Early to mid 19th century	The lodge is in stone on a plinth, with oversailing eaves, and a hipped stone slate roof. There is a single storey, and a symmetrical front of three bays. The central doorway has Tuscan pilasters and a pediment, and the windows are sashes. There is a later extension to the rear with a roof of blue slate.	II
Mounting block, Beech Lawn; 53.67546°N 1.45921°W	—	Mid to late 19th century (probable)	The mounting block is against a wall in the yard to the north of the house. It is in freestone, and consists of a single block with four cut steps.	II
Telephone kiosk 53.67522°N 1.46385°W		1935	The telephone kiosk is outside the former post office. It is of the K6 type designed by Giles Gilbert Scott. Constructed in cast iron with a square plan and a dome, it has three unperforated crowns in the top panels.	II
