= Francis Drake (antiquary) =

English antiquary and surgeon

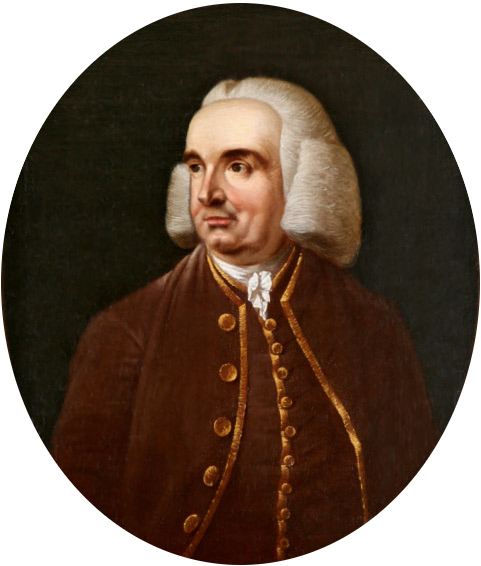
- Born: 1696; Pontefract, West Riding of Yorkshire, England
- Died: 16 March 1771 (aged 74–75); Beverley, East Riding of Yorkshire, England
- Citizenship: United Kingdom
- Known for: Publishing a history of York
- Scientific career
- Fields: History; Archaeology

Francis Drake (January 1696 – 16 March 1771) was an English antiquary and surgeon, best known as the author of an influential history of York, which he entitled Eboracum after the Roman name for the city.

== Early life ==
Drake was born in Pontefract, where his father, Reverend Francis Drake, was vicar, and was baptised there on 22 January 1696. His elder brother was the clergyman Samuel Drake. While still an adolescent, he was apprenticed to a York surgeon called Christopher Birbeck. Birbeck died in 1717, and, at the age of 21, Drake took over the practice. Ten years later he was appointed to the prestigious office of city surgeon of York.

== Marriage ==
In 1720, in York Minster, Drake married Mary Woodyeare, daughter of a former secretary to Sir William Temple, 1st Baronet. There were five sons, only two of whom survived childhood. Mary Drake died in 1728 at the age of 35 and was buried in the church of St Michael le Belfrey, where there is a wall monument to her.

== Eboracum ==
Drake had always been interested in history and had inherited a number of historical manuscripts. In 1729, he contacted Thomas Hearne, asking for help in compiling a history of York, but to no avail. His half-sister's husband, however, who was a schoolmaster in Leeds, encouraged him, and, with the aid of a number of other historians and collectors, he started work. Acknowledged as giving Drake assistance with Eboracum were: John Anstis, Brian Fairfax, Roger Gale, George Holmes, Henry Keepe, Benjamin Langwith, and Browne Willis.

By April 1731, Drake was asking the city corporation for permission to inspect the historical documents in its care, and the corporation, as well as allowing him to do so, voted him £50 towards the cost of acquiring and printing illustrations for his book. Another £50 was contributed by Lord Burlington, who had rescued Drake from an unjust imprisonment for debt and was the dedicatee of the book.

Eboracum, a folio-sized book of around 800 pages with the subtitle The History and Antiquities of the City of York, from its Original to the Present Time; together with the History of the Cathedral Church and the Lives of the Archbishops, was published in 1736, much of the cost having been borne by the 540 subscribers, who included the Archbishop of Canterbury and the Bishop of London, but not the Archbishop of York, Lancelot Blackburne, for reasons that are not clear.

== Later life ==
Francis Drake was elected Fellow of the Society of Antiquaries of London and of the Royal Society (1736). In 1741 he was appointed honorary surgeon to the new York County Hospital, retiring in 1756 (although he was relieved of the position during 1745–6 because of his Jacobite sympathies). The duties of this post were not onerous, and he continued to devote most of his time to historical work. Between 1751 and 1760, he published, with the bookseller Caesar Ward, the thirty volumes of The Parliamentary or Constitutional History of England from the Earliest Times to the Restoration of King Charles II, with a second edition, in twenty-four volumes, appearing in 1763.

In 1767, failing health compelled him to leave York to live with his eldest son, Francis, who was the vicar of St Mary's Church, Beverley. He died in Beverley and was buried in the church, where a memorial tablet was placed by his son. His second surviving son, William, also became an antiquary.

== Masonic career ==
Drake became a Freemason in September 1725, shortly before his election as Junior Warden in the old lodge in York, which had now decided to call itself the Grand Lodge of All England "meeting since time immemorial in the City of York". He delivered an address, as he had heard that meetings of Freemasons contained a lecture on architecture or geometry. On re-election the following year, his words were better recorded. On that occasion he used his speech to claim the precedence of his own lodge over all other masonic lodges, since the old charges stated that the first lodge was held in York.

The York lodge disappears from history during the 1730s, but it enjoyed a revival in 1761, with Drake as the first Grand Master. Although ill health caused Drake to retire, the impetus he imparted to the lodge gave it life for the next thirty years. His real importance to historians of Freemasonry lies, however, in his 1726 address, giving a rare insight into the mind of an 18th-century mason.
