= William Dixon (cricketer) =

New Zealand cricketer

Personal information
- Full name: William Gordon Dixon
- Born: 21 July 1856; Little Sutton, Cheshire, England
- Died: 26 January 1938 (aged 81); Point Piper, New South Wales, Australia
- Bowling: Right-arm fast

Domestic team information
- Years: Team
- 1875/76–1885/86: Otago
- Source: ESPNcricinfo, 8 May 2016

William Gordon Dixon (21 July 1856 – 26 January 1938) was an English-born cricketer. He played nine first-class matches in New Zealand for Otago between the 1875–76 and 1885–86 seasons.

Dixon was born at Little Sutton in Cheshire in England in 1856. He worked as a bank officer and, after moving to Sydney, Australia in the 1890s, was the general manager of the Alliance Assurance Company. He was the manager of the company at the time of the sinking of SS Catterthun in 1895 and the subsequent salvage of much of the gold cargo carried on the ship.

Dixon made his debut for Otago in representative cricket in a January 1876 match against Canterbury at the South Dunedin Recreation Ground. He played once for the team in 1878 against the same opposition, and then seven times in first-class matches between the 1882–83 season and 1885–86. In his nine first-class matches Dixon scored a total of 156 runs and took seven wickets. He played for Otago teams in non first-class matches against a touring English team led by James Lillywhite in March 1877 and against touring Australian teams in January 1878 and November 1886. He played club cricket for Carisbrook Cricket Club in Dunedin―in 1885 he scored 219 runs for the club in a total of 458 against Excelsior.

Described as "well-known" in Dunedin sporting circle, Dixon also played rugby union for the Otago representative team and captained Dunedin FC.

Dixon moved to Sydney in 1887, promoted by the Union Insurance Company to run the Sydney branch. In Australia he was a member of the Union Club, the Royal Sydney Golf Club and the Royal Automobile Club of Australia. He was married and living at Point Piper near Sydney when he died at the age of 81 in 1938. (Note: Contemporary obituaries given Dixon's age at the time of his death as 80.) He was survived by his wife and two children.
