= William Dixon (industrialist, born 1788) =

British miner and industrialist

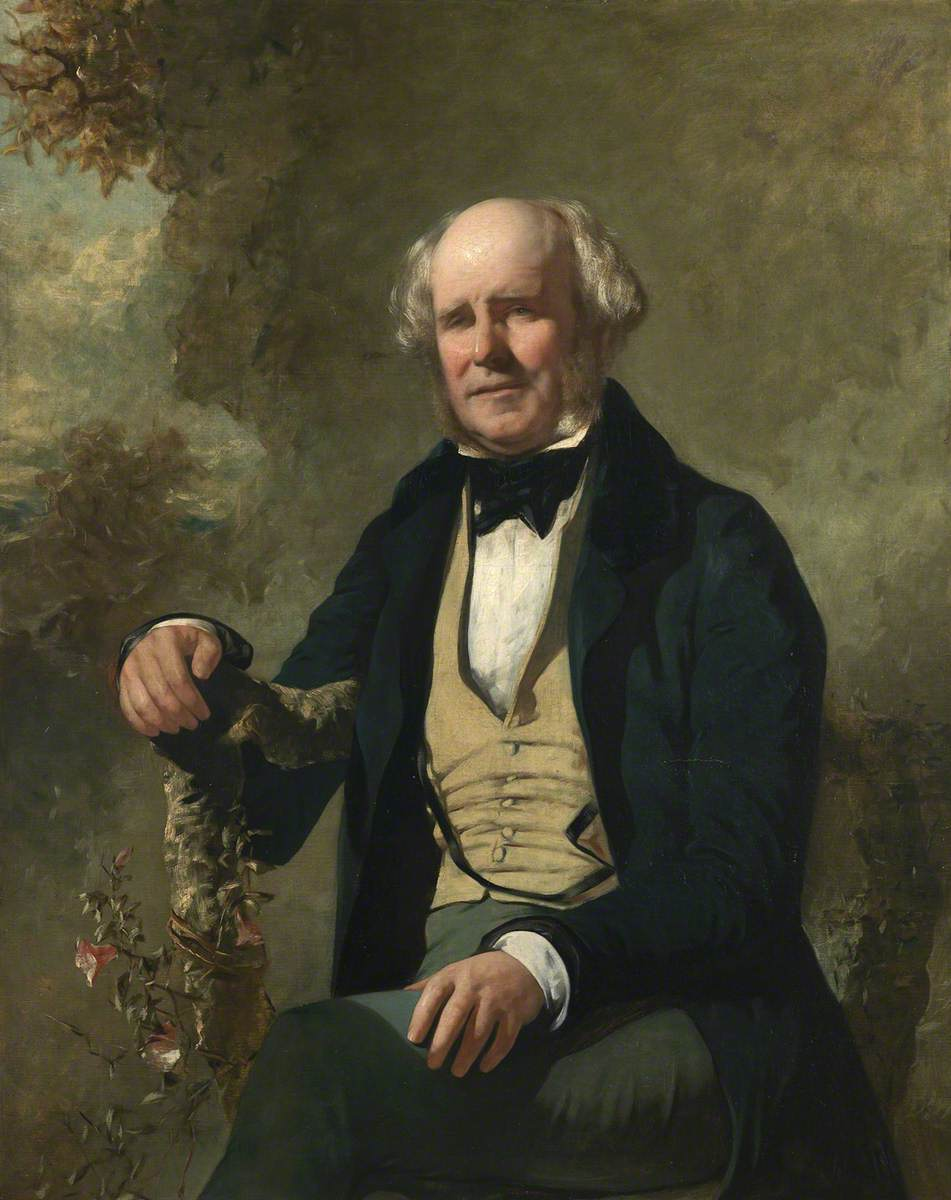
- Portrait of William Dixon of Govanhill. The artist is unknown.
- Born: 1788; Gorbals, Glasgow
- Died: 1859 (aged 70–71)
- Occupations: Miner, industrialist
- Known for: Owner of the Govan Iron Works, Calder Iron Works and Wilsontown Ironworks
- Spouse: Elizabeth Dixon née Strang
- Children: 1

William Dixon (1788-1859) was a Scottish industrialist and the second generation of the Dixon family of Govan, Glasgow, who ran a number of the coal and iron businesses in Lanarkshire.

Dixon's father was William Dixon (1753–1824) senior, who was one of the first to exploit the Old Monkland coal fields in North Lanarkshire, leading him to own several iron works, collieries and estates that were used for mineral and coal extraction.

== Early life and marriage ==
William Dixon was born in Glasgow in 1788 to William Dixon (1753–1824) and Janet née Smith and was one of 7 children. Dixon married Elizabeth Dixon née Strang and the couple had one child, William Smith Dixon, who was born in Gallowknow, Gorbals in 1824.

== Career ==
By 1834, Dixons organisation, which used the Longwall mining technique in his collieries to extract the coal, were amongst the biggest in Scotland.
