= William Dixon (priest) =

Dean of Barbados from 2000 until 2004

William George St Clair Dixon, CBE (born October 9, 1939) was the Dean of Barbados from 2000 until 2004.

He was educated at the University of the West Indies and ordained in 1975. He was Priest in charge then Rector at St. Christopher, Barbados from 1977 to 2000.
