= William Dixon (industrialist, born 1753) =

British miner and industrialist

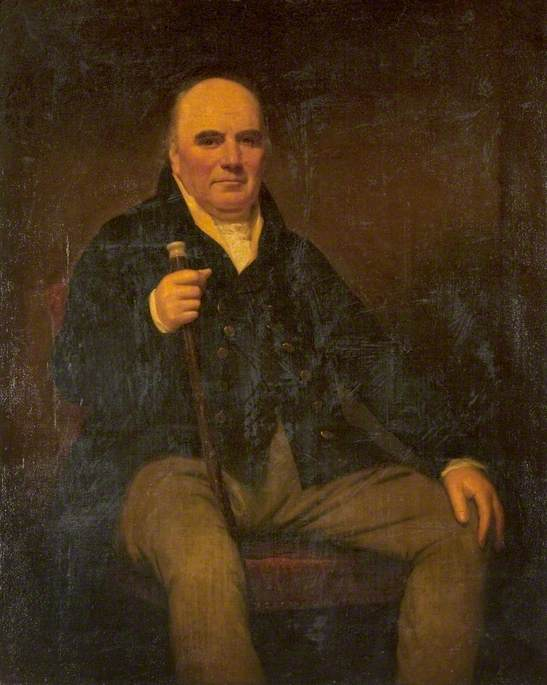
- William Dixon of Govanhill by Henry Raeburn
- Born: 1753
- Died: 1824 (aged 70–71)
- Occupations: Miner, industrialist
- Known for: Owner of several coal mines along with Calder Iron Works and Wilsontown Ironworks

William Dixon (1753–1824) was a British miner and industrialist from Northumberland who became the owner of number of coal fields in Govan, Faskine, Palacecraig and Wilsontown along with the Calder Iron Works and Wilsontown Ironworks in the North Lanarkshire area of Scotland.

== Life ==
William Dixon was born in Northumberland. When he was 17, around 1770 or 1771, he left the county with some friends to move to Glasgow. He found work as miner in Govan and through ambition and hard work had become the lessee of the Govan coalfield by 1770-1771.

In 1775, Dixon married Janet née Smith and together had 7 children. His sons William Dixon (1788-1859) and John Dixon became businessmen and continued their father's interests.

== Career ==
At some point in 1770's, Dixon had become the manager of the Govan colliery. In 1795, Dixon formed a partnership with the Scottish engineer David Mushet, who discovered blackband ironstone near Coatbridge and James Creelman, a Glasgow pottery and tile manufacturer, established the Calder Iron Works near Airdrie in North Lanarkshire at a cost of £15,000. The iron works ran it difficulties and went into receivership, with the result that Dixon bought the holdings for £400. Dixon along with Mushet formed a new partnership and restarted the ironworks, with Mushet acting as manager. The Calder Iron Works company was highly successful and when the partnership was dissolved in 1802, Dixon bought out the concern for £19000. In 1803, Dixon purchased the Palacecraig estate, located in the south-east corner of Coatbridge, North Lanarkshire for mineral extraction of ironstone that was plentiful, along with coal within the Old Monkland's area.

In 1813, when the Govan collieries was put up for sale, Dixon managed to gain a 44% stake in the company at a cost of £30,000. He ran the company with the purchasing group until 1819, when he bought it outright. In 1819, he purchased the Faskine estate, located directly west of Palacecraig, also for coal and mineral extraction. In 1821, Dixon along with his son bought the Wilsontown Ironworks, estates and mine near the village of Forth in Lanarkshire.

When William Dixon died in 1824 (Note: Several sources give the date of death of Dixon at 1822 e.g. William S. Murphy. The Oxford Dictionary of National Biography firmy states it was 1824.) the business passed to his son, William Dixon. At the time it was the second largest coal and iron business in Scotland.
