= John Freeston =

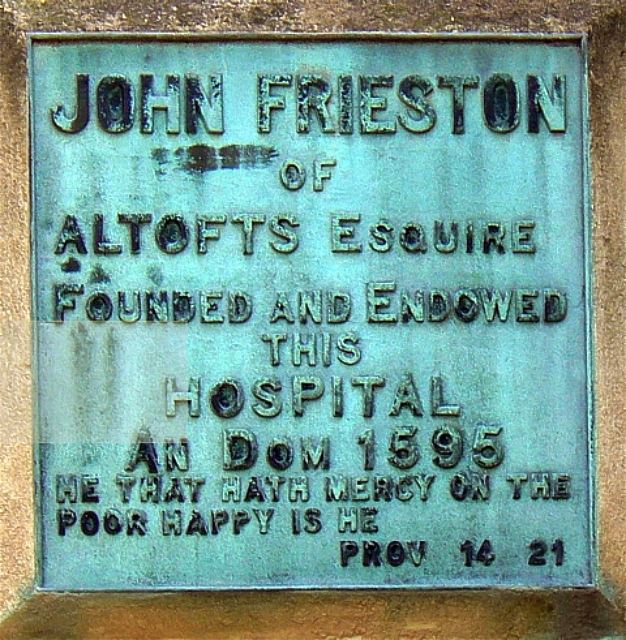
Monument to John Freeston at Frieston's Hospital (originally an Almshouse), Kirkthorpe, Wakefield, West Yorkshire

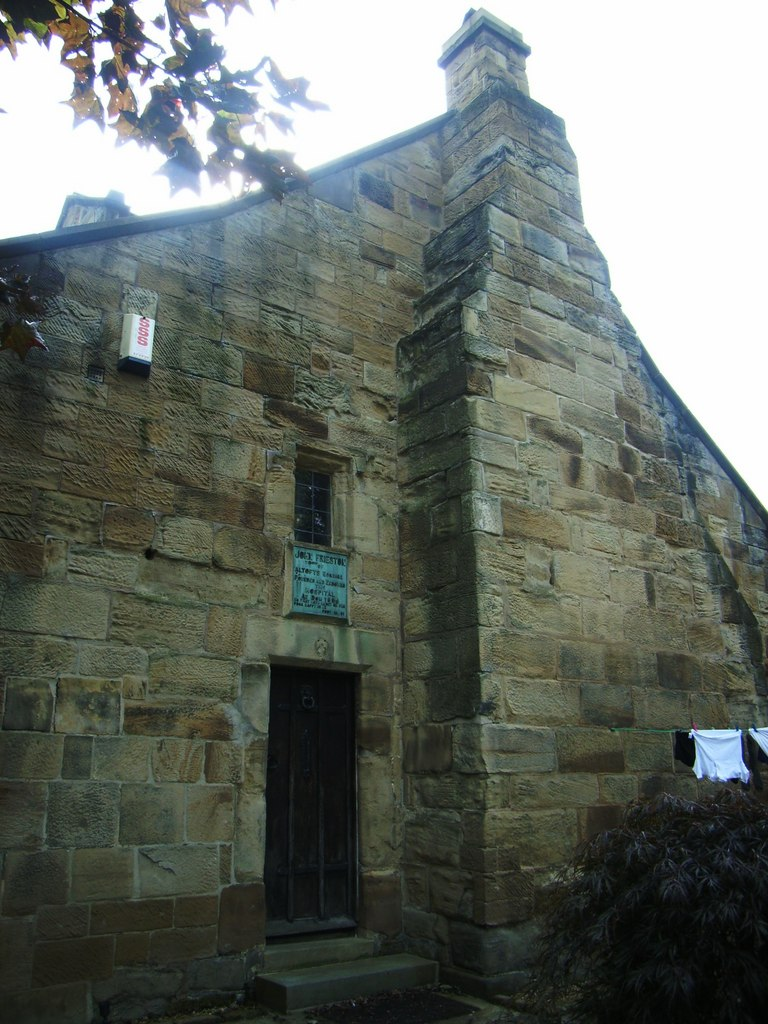
Frieston's Hospital, endowed by Freeston in 1594 as accommodations for seven poor men

John Freeston (1512–1594) was a barrister from Altofts, West Yorkshire, admitted in 1544 to Gray's Inn in London. Possibly inspired by Walter Midway, Freeston posthumously left £500 to fund a school in Normanton, with a scholarship program in place to allow students from Normanton to gain a place at Emmanuel College, Cambridge (the scholarship was later transferred to Sidney Sussex College in 1607).

The will allowed for £25 of this funding to go to the school each year, enough to pay for its construction and its school master's salary. The school did not stay open long enough to use up this funding, however, and an investigation in 1890 revealed it had inflated to £400 per annum. It was decided that the town would use this funding to set up a secondary school, now the Freeston Academy.

== See also ==
- Grade I listed buildings in West Yorkshire
