= Anthony Freston =

Anthony Freston, né Brettingham (1757–1819) was an English Anglican clergyman.

== Life ==
Freston was the son of Robert Brettingham of Norwich, and nephew of Matthew Brettingham, the architect of Holkham Hall, the Earl of Leicester's seat in Norfolk. While a child Anthony took the name of Freston, in pursuance of the will of his maternal uncle, William Freston of Mendham, who died in 1761, and devised to him his estates in Norfolk and Suffolk. He matriculated at Oxford as a commoner of Christ Church, 26 December 1775, and proceeded B.A. in 1780. Having married a Cambridge lady, the widow of Thomas Hyde, he removed in 1783 to Clare Hall in that university, where he was incorporated B.A., and graduated M.A. the same year. In 1792 he was licensed to the perpetual cure of Needham, Norfolk, in his own patronage, and in 1801 he was presented by a college friend to the rectory of Edgworth, Gloucestershire. George Huntingford, bishop of Gloucester, appointed him rural dean of the deanery of Stonehouse. He died on 25 December 1819.

== Works ==
- Provisions for the more equal Maintenance of the Clergy, 1784, 12mo (anon.)
- An Elegy, 1787, 4to.
- Poems on Several Subjects, 1787, 8vo.
- A Discourse on Laws, intended to show that legal Institutions are necessary, not only to the Happiness, but to the very Existence of Man, London, 1792, 4to.
- Address to the People of England, 1796, 8vo (anon.).
- A Collection of Evidences for the Divinity of our Lord Jesus Christ, London, 1807, 8vo.
- Six Sermons on some of the more important Doctrines of Christianity; to which are added five Sermons on Occasional Subjects, Cirencester, 1809, 8vo.
