= Freestone =

Freestone or free stone may refer to:

== Places ==
=== Australia ===
- Freestone, Queensland, a locality in the Southern Downs Region

=== United States ===
- Freestone, California, United States
- Freestone, Texas, an unincorporated community
- Freestone County, Texas

== People with the surname ==
- Chris Freestone (born 1971), retired English football forward
- Eric Freestone (1904–1957), Australian rugby league player
- Lewis Freestone (born 1999), English footballer
- Roger Freestone (born 1968), Welsh footballer
- Scott Freestone (born 1964), Australian rugby league player
- Tom Freestone (born 1938), American politician
- Tori Freestone, English jazz musician

== Other uses ==
- Freestone (masonry)
- A type or part of drupe, a fruit
- Freestone peach, a type of peach (fruit)
- Freestone stream, a stream that flows seasonally
- USS Freestone (APA-167), a Haskell-class attack transport
- Freestone and Webb, English coachbuilders
- Freestone Hill, archaeological site in Ireland
