= Govan Iron Works =

Ironworks in Govanhill, Glasgow founded in 1839

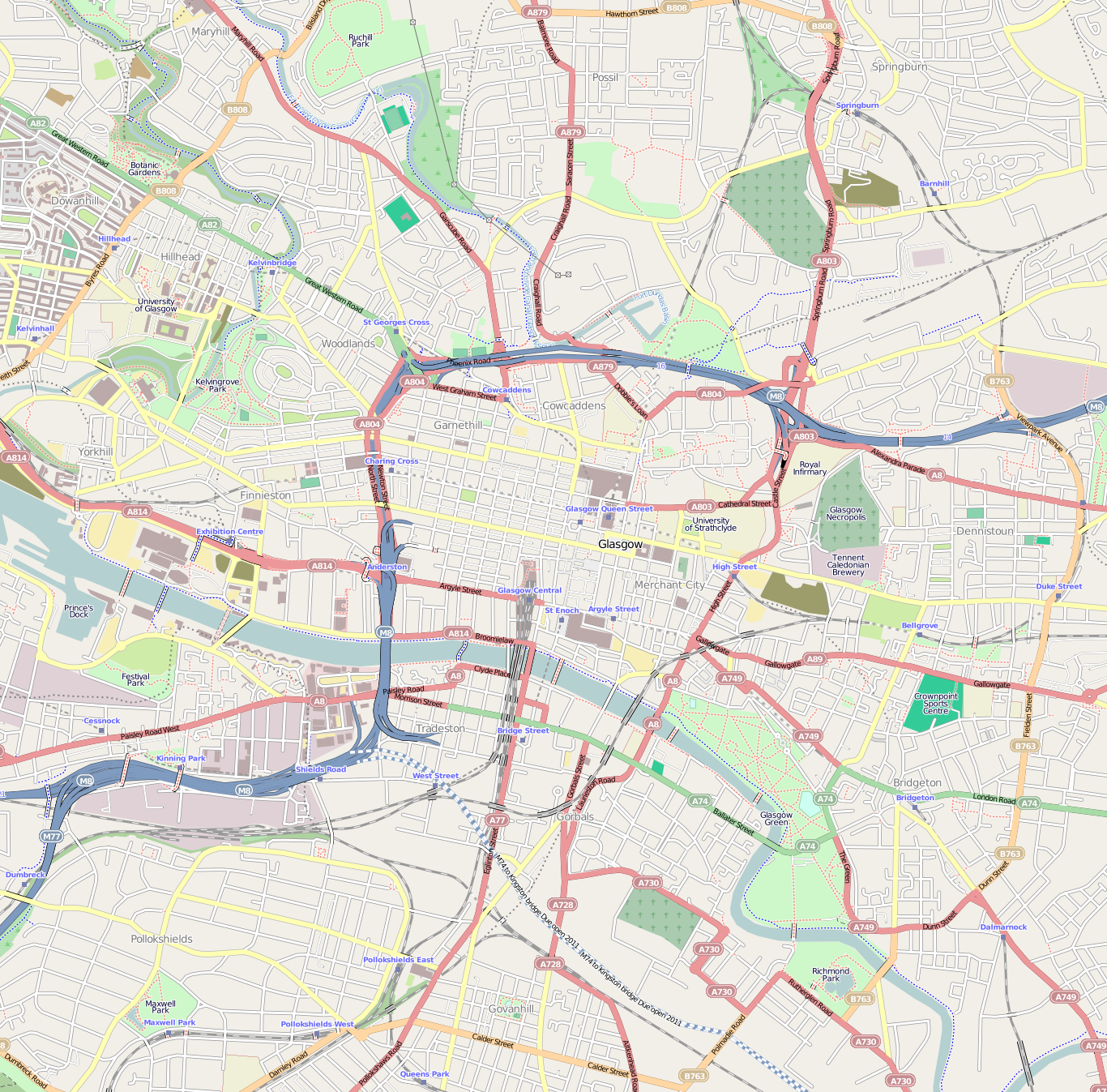
- Location within Central Glasgow
- Built: 1739
- Location: 525 Crown Street, Glasgow
- Coordinates: 55.8432°N 4.2534°W
- Products: Iron rods and bars
- Employees: 800 in 1842
- Owner: William Dixon
- Defunct: 1966

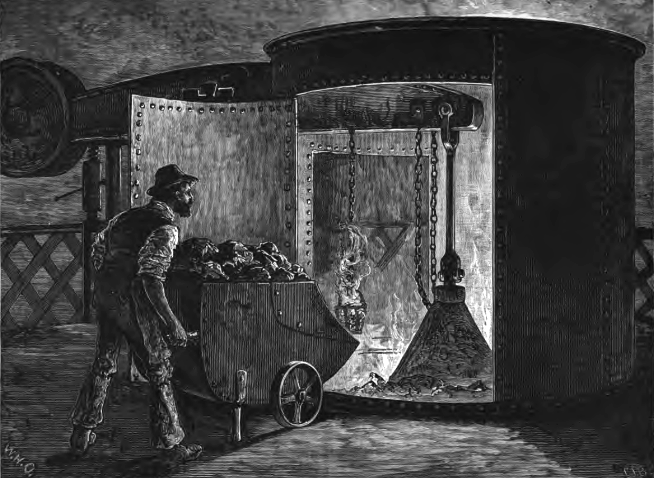
Charging a blast furnace at the Govan Iron Works, Scotland c. 1885

Govan Iron Works was an ironworks with five blast furnaces that was founded in 1839 by William Dixon and located in 525 Crown Street in Govanhill, Glasgow.

== Formation ==
In 1800, Govanhill was well-established with coal mines with many of them owned by William Dixon, an English coal merchant from Northumberland who had moved to Scotland in 1770, when he was 17 to find work, as a "collier laddie", eventually becoming a miner. Dixons career in mining progressed when he first became a colliery manager, then owner of Calder Iron Works and Wilsontown Ironworks.
