= Henry Keepe =

English antiquarian

Henry Keepe (1652–1688) was an English antiquarian, known for his Monumenta Westmonasteriensia, a history of Westminster Abbey.

== Life ==
Born in Fetter Lane, London, he was the son of Charles Keepe, a Cavalier cornet in Sir William Courtney's regiment of cavalry in the English Civil War, and then in the exchequer office. He entered New Inn, Oxford, as a gentleman-commoner in Midsummer term 1668. Leaving university without a degree, he returned to London and studied law in the Inner Temple.

For 18 years Keepe belonged to the choir of Westminster Abbey. He died at his lodgings in Carter Lane, near St Paul's Cathedral, at the end of May 1688, and was buried in St Gregory by St Paul's. Anthony Wood stated that Keepe had become a Catholic convert under James II.

== Works ==
Keepe's works are:

- Monumenta Westmonasteriensia; or an Historical Account of … the Abbey-Church of Westminster, London, 1682, dedicated to the Earl of Arundel. It preserved information about monuments in the Abbey that have subsequently been altered or moved.
- The Genealogies of the high-born Prince and Princess George and Anne of Denmark, London, 1684. Dedicated to the Princess Anne.
- A true and perfect Narrative of the strange and unexpected Finding of the Crucifix and Gold Chain of that pious Prince S. Edward, the King and Confessor, which was found after 620 years' interment. Published as Charles Taylour, Gent., London, 1688.
- A manuscript account of the city of York, begun about 1684, containing descriptions of the coats of arms in the churches. Francis Drake, in his Eboracum (1736), acknowledged heraldic assistance from Keepe's collections.

== Notes ==
Attribution

This article incorporates text from a publication now in the public domain: Lee, Sidney, ed. (1892). "Keepe, Henry". Dictionary of National Biography. Vol. 30. London: Smith, Elder & Co.
