= Normanton, West Yorkshire =

Town and civil parish in West Yorkshire, England

Coordinates: 53.697°N 1.416°W

Normanton
- Town
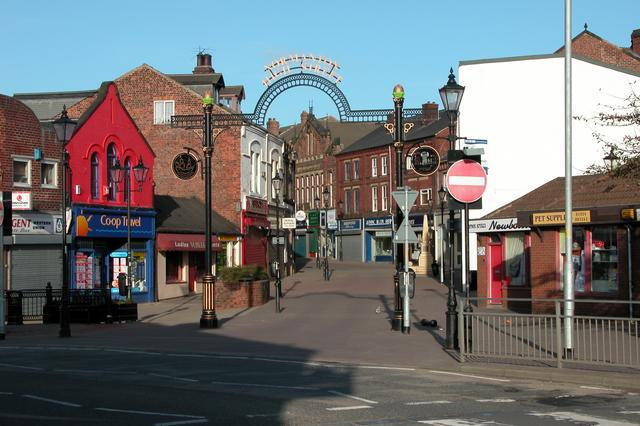
- Normanton High Street

- Location within West Yorkshire
- Population: 20,872
- OS grid reference: SE385225
  - London: 165 mi (266 km) south
- Civil parish: Normanton and Altofts
- Metropolitan borough: City of Wakefield
- Metropolitan county: West Yorkshire
- Region: Yorkshire and the Humber
- Country: England
- Sovereign state: United Kingdom
- Post town: NORMANTON
- Postcode district: WF6
- Dialling code: 01924
- Police: West Yorkshire
- Fire: West Yorkshire
- Ambulance: Yorkshire
- UK Parliament: Normanton and Hemsworth & Pontefract, Castleford and Knottingley
- Website: https://www.normantontowncouncil.co.uk/

Normanton is a town in the civil parish of Normanton and Altofts, in the City of Wakefield in West Yorkshire, England. It is located north-east of Wakefield and south-west of Castleford. The civil parish extends west and north to the River Calder, and includes the large village of Altofts. At the time of the 2011 Census, the population of the civil parish was 20,872.

The Normanton ward of the Wakefield City Council does not include Altofts, but includes the civil parish of Warmfield cum Heath to the south-west of Normanton. The ward had a population of 16,220 in 2011.

== History ==
The Domesday Book gives information on 'Norman-tune' as:

In Normantune there are 10 carucates for geld, which 5 plows can plough. 2 thegns had 2 manors there T.R.E. Now, in the King's hand there are 6 villeins there, and 3 bordars, a priest and a church, with 3 ploughs, 3 acres (12,000 m^{2}) of meadow. Pasturable wood (land) 6 furlongs in length and 1 in breadth. The whole of this land lies in the soc of Wachefelt, except the Church. T.R.E. it was worth 12s: now (it is worth) 10s.

Normanton was originally surrounded by a moat, and in Norman times was the site of an enclosed settlement (chosen for its strategic view points across the surrounding area), and became known as 'Norman – tune', or 'Norman – ton'.

At the time the Domesday Book was compiled in 1086, the occupation of Yorkshire by the Normans was underway. Archaeological evidence at today's Normanton points to Haw Hill (or How Hill), an eminence that was probably a Norman defensive strategic mound once reinforced by a wooden palisade. The evidence of a Norman motte-and-bailey fortification at the town, and the name, is likely evidence that Normanton's name derived from the Anglo-Norman presence in the area. Nearby, after all, were Tickhill, the fortress of Norman magnate Roger de Busli, as well as other new Norman power centres. Although the area had once been part of the Scandinavian Danelaw, William the Conqueror's scorched earth northern campaign had left the area ripe for exploitation by his Lords. By all measures, Normanton likely owes its name to these new invaders.

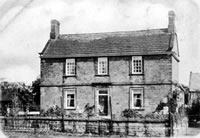
Hanson House, Normanton, c. 1890

One of the earliest buildings to survive within the village is Hanson House. This is set back from the church and has a timber-frame construction. The building was constructed in the mid-15th century, with a later wing added in the 18th century. A fire has damaged the building, which is being restored and modernised.

On 1 April 1938 Altofts parish was abolished and merged with Normanton. On 1 April 2023 the merged parish was renamed from "Normanton" to "Normanton and Altofts", at the same time part was moved to Featherstone. In 1931 the parish of Normanton (prior to the merge) had a population of 15,684.

=== Growth ===
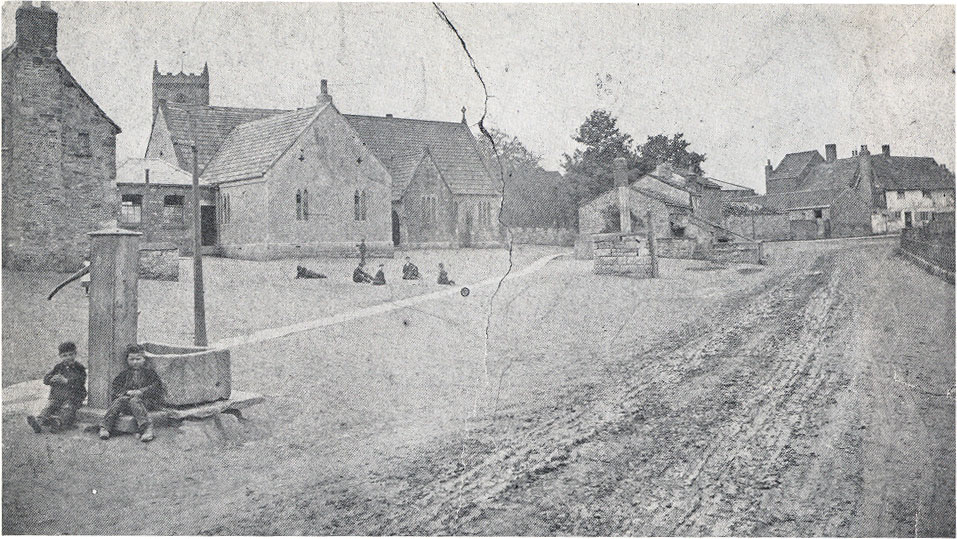
All Saints' Parish Church rooms c. 1880

All Saints' Parish Church rooms in 2008

A grammar school was founded in Normanton by John Freeston (now the 'Parish Rooms', later moved to the site of the Normanton Junior School on Church Lane) in 1592, but the town remained very small until it became the focus of several railway lines in the mid-19th century. Work began in 1837 under the supervision of George Stephenson on the construction of the North Midland Railway from Derby to Leeds. This was soon followed by an addition to the York and North Midland Railway from York and then the Manchester and Leeds Railway from Manchester which all extended to Normanton thereby giving the town access to much of the country. The Leeds and Manchester lines crossed a 51-mile (82 km) stretch across the Pennines and at the time had the world's longest railway station platform at Normanton, a quarter of a mile long. The station was, for the next ten years or so, the most important in England, employing over 700 people who looked after the station's 700,000 passengers a year.

In Victorian times Normanton station was one of the most important stations in Northern England, and Queen Victoria stopped over in the Station Hotel. The town also served as an important part of the transport infrastructure for national and local industries including coal and bricks, although most of this was lost during the 1950s and 1960s with the last remaining operational brickworks eventually closing in the mid-1990s. There were three brickworks in town which were all built within the small area of Newland, taking advantage of the abundance of clay from the area. A fourth works was founded in the 1890s by a Thomas Kirk from Nottingham, who had heard rumours that Normanton was rapidly turning into an important junction on the railways. Both Kirk and his sons used their life savings and formed the Normanton Brick Company at nearby Altofts which finally closed in 2011

The coming of the railways enabled the locally mined coal to be sent across the country. Demand soon outstripped supply and many more shafts were sunk to reach the coal seams under the town. In 1871 Dom Pedro, the Emperor of Brazil, visited Normanton with his Empress and gave his name (in a slightly altered form) to the Don Pedro Colliery at Hopetown. Today roads in the area of the former colliery retain the name. At their peak the collieries employed over 10,000 men, most of whom wanted to move themselves and their families to Normanton. The town enjoyed a boom period with more mines opening and more shafts being sunk in order to meet the increasing demand for coal until, by the mid-1970s, most coal seams in the Normanton area were worked-out.

=== Decline ===
The disputes surrounding the miners' strike of 1984–85 meant that many mines across the country were to close although by this stage there were no collieries still in production in Normanton. However, the strike still affected many families in the area, as Normanton colliers still worked in pits in neighbouring towns. The area once occupied by the St John's or Newland Colliery is now part of the controversial Welbeck landfill site which has been the subject of both local and national media attention since its development as a toxic tip. The site attracted so much negative attention that the group Residents Against Toxic Scheme (RATS) was established to halt planning permission for the disposal of toxic chemicals at the site, claiming the scheme was an extreme health hazard.

Normanton suffered decline in the years following the miners' strike. The railway station was in such a state of neglect and disrepair that the decision was made to demolish it in 1986; the section of railway line between Goosehill Junction and Crofton Interchange were lifted the year after. Very little now remains of Normanton's railway and mining heritage.

=== Modern ===
Normanton has become a growing commuter suburb of the Leeds City Region, with relatively cheap housing and efficient transport links. The town is still accessible via Normanton railway station, and is currently served by an unmanned island platform station with regular trains to Leeds, Castleford, Wakefield and Sheffield Meadowhall Interchange.

The addition and expansion of the Eurolink Industrial Estate at Junction 31 of the M62 attracted national and multi-national corporations to locate their distribution depots to Normanton. Being centrally located within the UK, the town is served by three major motorway networks: the M62 linking Liverpool to Hull (west to east); the M1 linking Leeds to London (North to South); and the North of England via a new link between the M62 and the A1(M) at nearby Ferrybridge.

== Churches ==
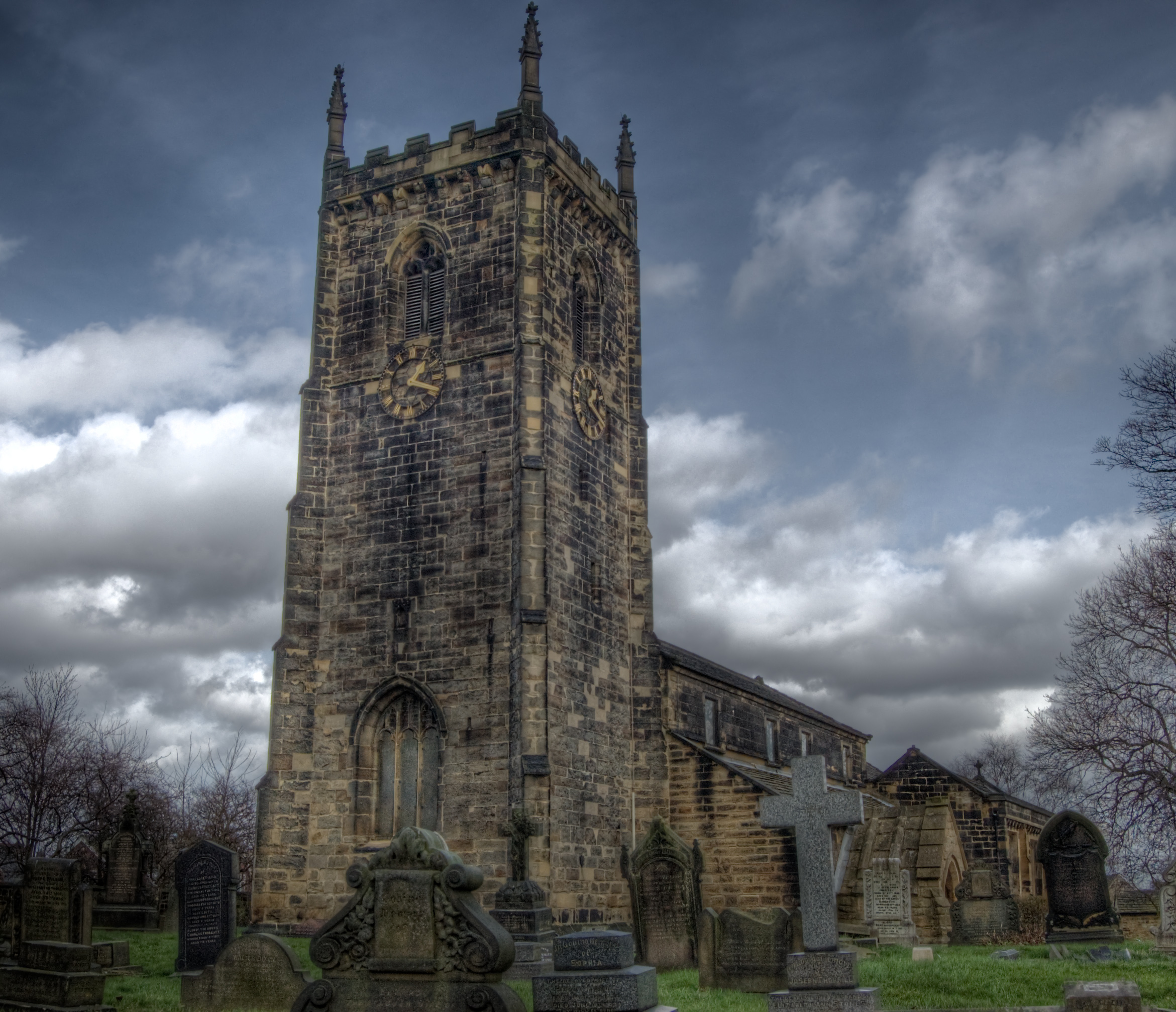
All Saints' Church, Normanton

All Saints' is the Church of England parish church of Normanton, West Yorkshire. It is believed to have existed since at least 1256 and is built in the Perpendicular style. An earlier church with a priest was mentioned in the Domesday Book.

Other churches include Normanton Methodist Church, and St John the Baptist Catholic Church.

== Newland ==
The Newland estate was a small township on the outskirts of Normanton and lies on the north bank of the River Calder. Existing since 1213, when it was established by King John as a preceptory of the Knights Templar, it was later transferred to the similar organisation, the "Knights Hospitaller", in 1256. The earliest known preceptor of the Knights Hospitaller was Simon Paccable in 1313. Newland was once held by the Levett family, and William Levett, who was lord of the manor, was admitted tenant of the Knights Hospitaller on 2 October 1447.

The property belonging to the Hospitallers was dissolved by King Henry VIII, who bestowed the property upon himself. The estate changed hands of ownership a number of times after Henry sold the land in 1544, with final ownership landing on the Warmfield Company Limited in 1926, who ran a brickworks until the mid-20th century.

Newland today is kept as a nature reserve, with the remains of the estate overgrown with shrubs and plant life, the remains of Newland Hall still stand in the woodlands as a derelict building that last saw occupancy in 1972. A small fishing area just outside the Newland Estate is used by local fishermen.

== Transport ==
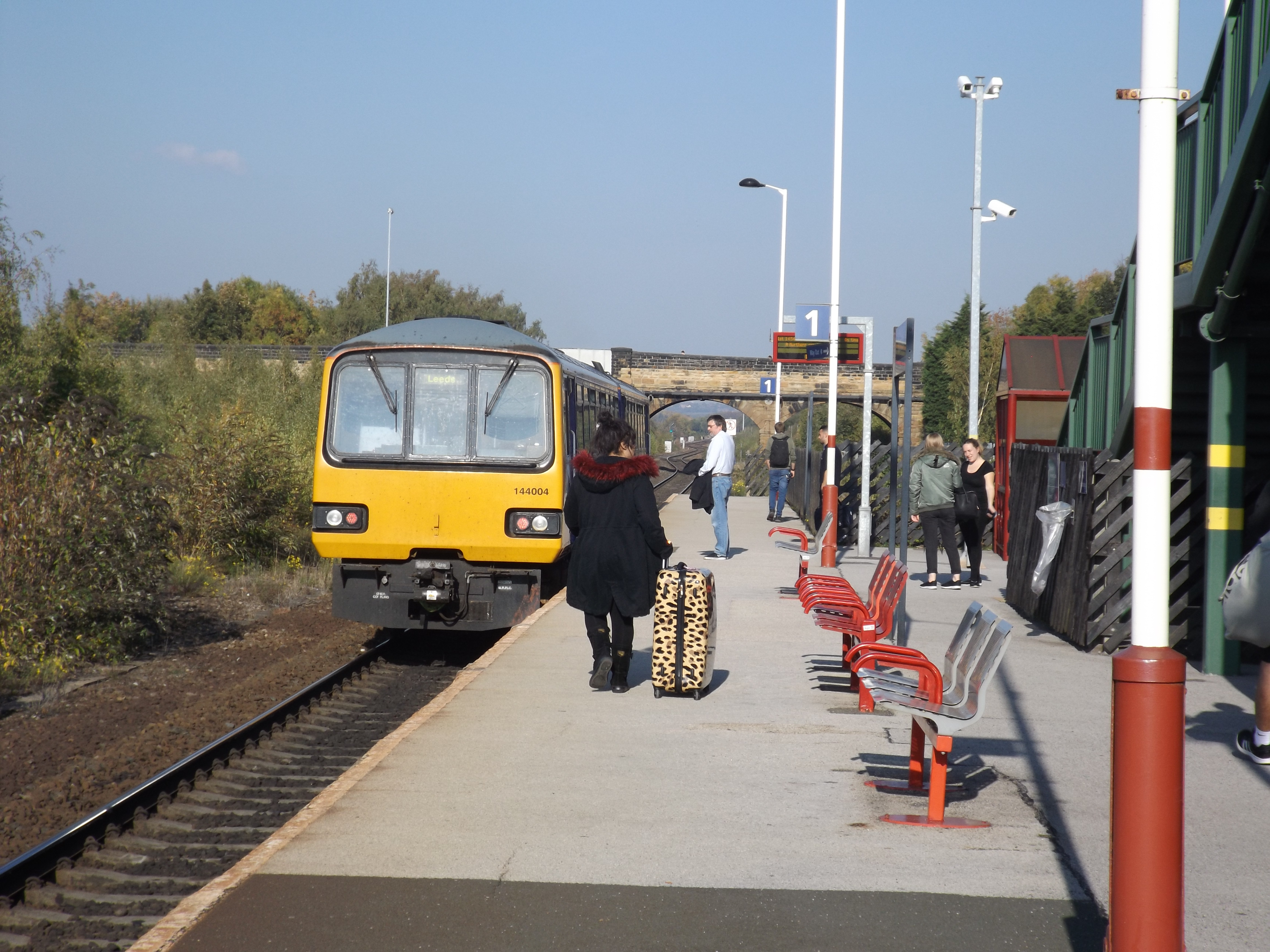
Normanton railway station

Normanton is just off of Junction 31 of the M62. It has a railway station, Normanton railway station. The town is on bus routes and is served by taxi and minibus companies.

== Education ==
The following is a list of schools in the Normanton area:

- Normanton All Saints Primary School
- Normanton Junior Academy
- Normanton Outwood Academy, Freeston
- Newlands Primary School
- Altofts Junior School
- Normanton Common Primary Academy
- St John the Baptist Catholic Primary School
- Martin Frobisher Primary School
- Lee Brigg Infant and Nursery School

== Media ==
Local news and television programmes are provided by BBC Yorkshire and ITV Yorkshire. Television signals are received from the Emley Moor TV transmitter.

Local radio stations are BBC Radio Leeds, Heart Yorkshire, Capital Yorkshire, Hits Radio West Yorkshire, Greatest Hits Radio Yorkshire, Rhubarb Radio and 5 Towns FM, a community station that broadcasts from Castleford.

The town is served the local newspaper, Wakefield Express.

== Sports ==
The town is home to two cricket clubs – Normanton St John's CC and Normanton Men in Blue. The town also has 2 football teams – A.S. Normanton F.C. and Normanton Athletic Juniors. Arguably the biggest sport in the area is Rugby League. Normanton Knights are the town's main amateur club and play in the National Conference League, which is the fourth tier of British Rugby League. The Knights play at Queen Elizabeth Drive Field.

== Notable people ==
- Paul Anderson – rugby league player-coach for Huddersfield
- Alice Bacon – Baroness Bacon, Labour Member of Parliament and party chair
- Lawrence Byford – senior police officer and author of the "Byford Report" into the Yorkshire Ripper investigation
- Ben Cockayne – rugby league player for Hull Kingston Rovers
- Billy Conway – rugby league player for Wakefield Trinity
- Richard Crawshay – London iron merchant and South Wales ironmaster
- Les Cusworth – rugby union player for Leicester Tigers
- Reece Dinsdale – actor
- John Freeston – school founder
- Levett Hanson – flamboyant author, courtier, expert on medieval knighthood, childhood friend of Horatio Nelson
- Duane Holmes – football player for Huddersfield Town and United States men's national soccer team
- Jamie Langley – rugby league player for Hull Kingston Rovers
- Joyce Lishman – leader in social work education and research
- Alister MacKenzie – renowned golf course architect
- Marion Mackenzie – medical doctor and suffragette
- Francis Mallet (or Mallett), English churchman and academic, and chaplain to Mary Tudor
- Keith Ripley – footballer
- Paul Routledge – writer and journalist
- David Topliss – rugby league player for Great Britain, Wakefield Trinity, Hull F.C.
- Ben Westwood – rugby league player for Warrington Wolves
- Martin Wood – rugby league player for Sheffield Eagles
- Shaun Winter Taylor-Steels, born Shaun Steels – drummer for My Dying Bride

== Filmography ==
The old Normanton brickyard, situated just off of the A655 Wakefield Road, was used in the late-1990s as the fictional setting of a murder in the ITV series A Touch Of Frost. The structure was intact but abandoned at the time of filming and was the ideal location favoured by the ITV production team. In the series a body was found by the Police in one of the factory's old kilns. Within 18 months of filming, the structure had been declared unsafe, and was partially demolished, leaving only the chimney stack standing.

== See also ==
- Listed buildings in Normanton, West Yorkshire
