= Warmfield cum Heath =

Civil parish in West Yorkshire, England

Coordinates: 53.6680°N 1.445°W

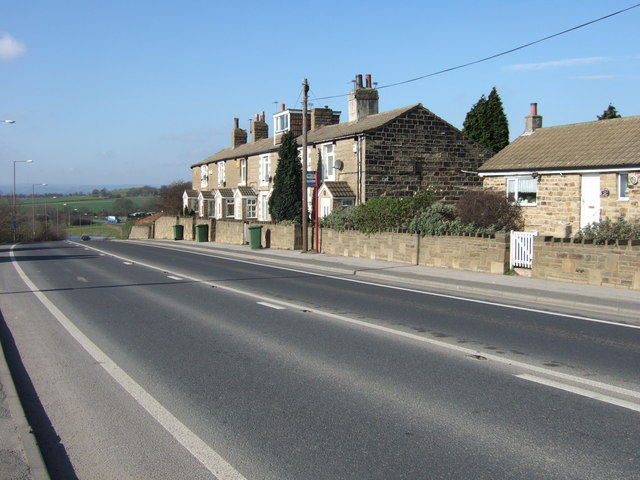
Cottages in Warmfield along the A655

Warmfield cum Heath is a civil parish in the City of Wakefield in West Yorkshire, England. The parish lies just over 1-mile (1.6 km) east of Wakefield, and has 57 listed buildings within the parish boundaries.

The parish consists of the villages of Warmfield in the east, Heath in the west, and Kirkthorpe in the north, and the hamlet of Goosehill north of Warmfield. Neighbouring settlements are Agbrigg and Wakefield to the west, Normanton to the northeast, Streethouse to the east, New Sharlston to the southeast, and Walton to the south.

== History ==
The parish had a population of 844 at the 2001 Census, increasing to 941 at the 2011 Census. Historically, the parish was within the wapentake of Agbrigg and Morley, and until 1974 it formed part of Wakefield Rural District, It is now within the electoral ward of Normanton.

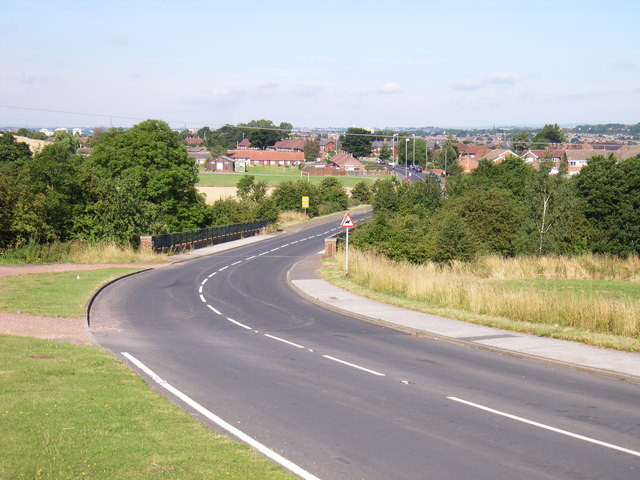
Kirkthorpe seen from the east

Warmfield is derived the Old English of Wærna, meaning stallion open country, and Heath stems from the Old English of Hǣp, meaning heathland. The A655 road traverses the area of the parish from southwest to northeast, and the southwestern parish boundary follows the A638 road. North of Kirkthorpe, the railway between Wakefield and Normanton passes through the area, but there is no station. At Goosehill there was a junction with the North Midland Railway which opened in 1840, but this was closed as a through route in 1987.

The parish has 57 listed buildings; six are grade I, six are grade II*, and the rest are grade II.

Heath Common was given registered common status in the late 19th century, and now forms part of a conservation area. Nikolaus Pevsner expresses surprise at the open plan common being just over a 1 mile (1.6 km) from the industrial centre of Wakefield. Plans have been submitted to Wakefield Council to house a battery energy storage system (BESS) on the common, which as of 2024 is being opposed by the people who live in the area.

Population of Warmfield cum Heath 1801–2011
1801	1811	1821	1831	1841	1851	1861	1871	1881	1891	1901	1911	1921	1931	1951	1961	1971	2001	2011
625	639	741	752	829	805	783	927	977	1,067	1,126	1,152	1,094	953	964	983	822	841	944

== Notable people ==
- Astronomer William Wales was baptised in the parish in 1734

== See also ==
- Listed buildings in Warmfield cum Heath
