= Kirkthorpe =

Village in West Yorkshire, England

Coordinates: 53.686491°N 1.44659°W

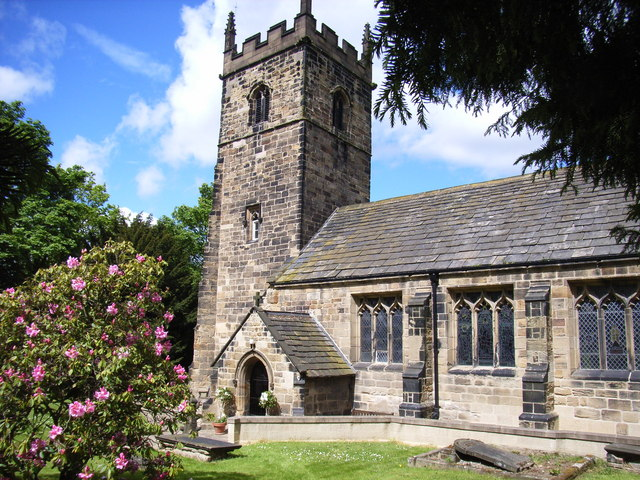
- St Peter's Church, Kirkthorpe

- Location within West Yorkshire
- OS grid reference: SE361210
- Metropolitan borough: City of Wakefield
- Metropolitan county: West Yorkshire
- Region: Yorkshire and the Humber
- Country: England
- Sovereign state: United Kingdom
- Post town: WAKEFIELD
- Postcode district: WF1
- Dialling code: 01924
- Police: West Yorkshire
- Fire: West Yorkshire
- Ambulance: Yorkshire
- UK Parliament: Normanton, Pontefract and Castleford

Kirkthorpe is a village within the City of Wakefield metropolitan borough of West Yorkshire, England. It lies about 3 miles (4.8 km) east of the city centre. The village's population is less than 100, so details are included in the parish of Warmfield cum Heath.

== Toponymy ==
The name "Kirkthorpe" means "outlying or secondary hamlet or farmstead with a church". It is formed of two elements, the first being the Old Scandinavian word kirkja ("church") and the second being either the Old English throp or the Old Scandinavian thorp. Both of these potential second elements mean "outlying, dependent or secondary farmstead or hamlet".

== History ==
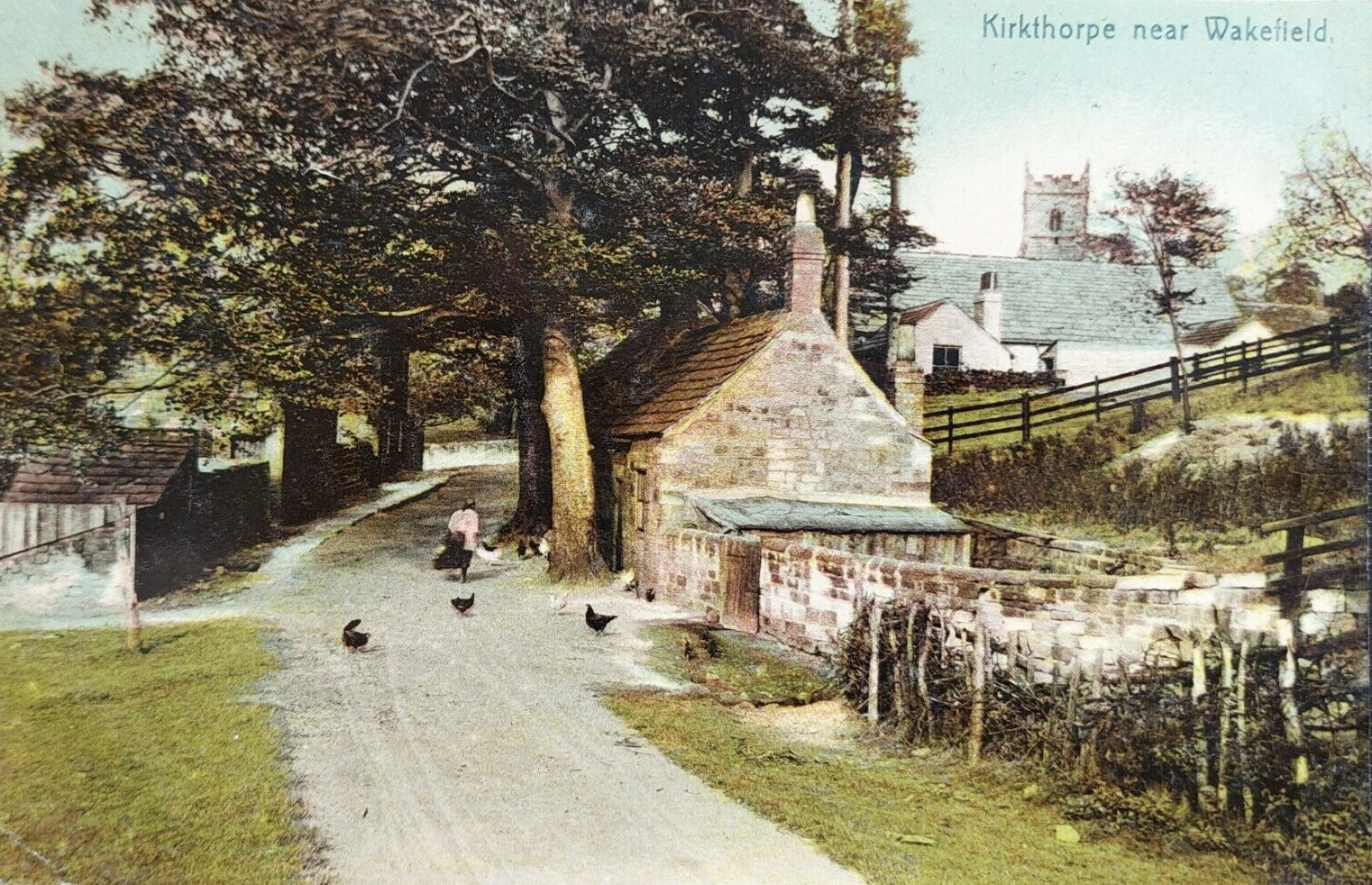
A scene in the village about 1910

The village has an Anglican church, the Church of St Peter, which was built in the 14th century and rebuilt in 1875. It is now a grade II* listed structure.

Kirkthorpe was one of the villages on the proposed route of HS2 heading north towards Leeds. The intent was to have a viaduct, 62 feet (19 m) high, running on a north–south alignment to the east of the village.

== See also ==
- Listed buildings in Warmfield cum Heath
