= Altofts =

Village in Wakefield, West Yorkshire, England

Coordinates: 53.697°N 1.416°W

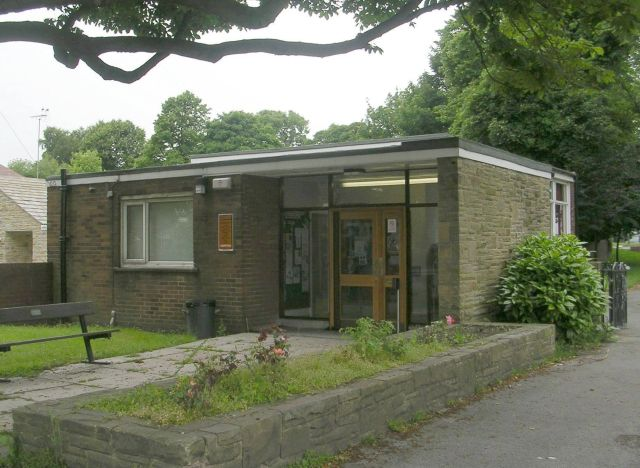
- Altofts' Old Library

- Location within West Yorkshire
- Population: 5,570
- OS grid reference: SE373235
- Civil parish: Normanton and Altofts
- Metropolitan borough: City of Wakefield
- Metropolitan county: West Yorkshire
- Region: Yorkshire and the Humber
- Country: England
- Sovereign state: United Kingdom
- Post town: NORMANTON
- Postcode district: WF6
- Dialling code: 01924
- Police: West Yorkshire
- Fire: West Yorkshire
- Ambulance: Yorkshire

Altofts is a village located in the civil parish of Normanton and Altofts, which forms part of the City of Wakefield in West Yorkshire, England. This village is situated between Wakefield and Castleford, being just one mile (1.6 km) to the north-west of Normanton, and is located close to the River Calder and Aire and Calder Navigation. In the days when it was a part of the West Riding of Yorkshire, Altofts witnessed rapid growth in the 1800s due to coal mining and the development of the railway in the region.

== History ==
The name Altofts derives from the Old English aldtofts meaning 'the old curtilages'.

Altofts was formerly a township in the parish of Normanton, in 1866 Altofts became a separate civil parish, in 1894 Altofts became an urban district, on 1 April 1938 the district and parish was abolished and merged with Normanton. In 1931 the parish had a population of 4981.

== Economy ==
Many people in the village previously worked in the local coal mines. The largest mine in the village, the West Riding Colliery, was owned by Pope and Pearsons. It was here that the first British coal dust experiments took place during 1908 and 1909, conducted by W. E. Garforth, manager of the colliery and president of the Mining Association of Great Britain. In the early 20th century Garforth's improvement to worker safety helped to develop underground safety and rescue procedures that are today common worldwide.

Altofts' brickworks, Normanton Brick Co Ltd, moved to its present Greenfield Road site from Wakefield Road in the late 1990s, but stopped production in 2011.

Today people are either employed in neighbouring towns and cities, or on the Wakefield Europort's 'Tuscany Park' industrial estate which has been developed over recent decades.

== Community facilities ==
The village has four pubs: The Horse and Jockey, Miners Arms, The Poplar, and the Robin Hood. The Horse and Jockey is the oldest pub in the village.

There are two Working Men's Clubs one of which has been converted into a community centre called The Brig. The Brig is owned by the registered charity called Altofts Community & Sports Foundation Ltd.

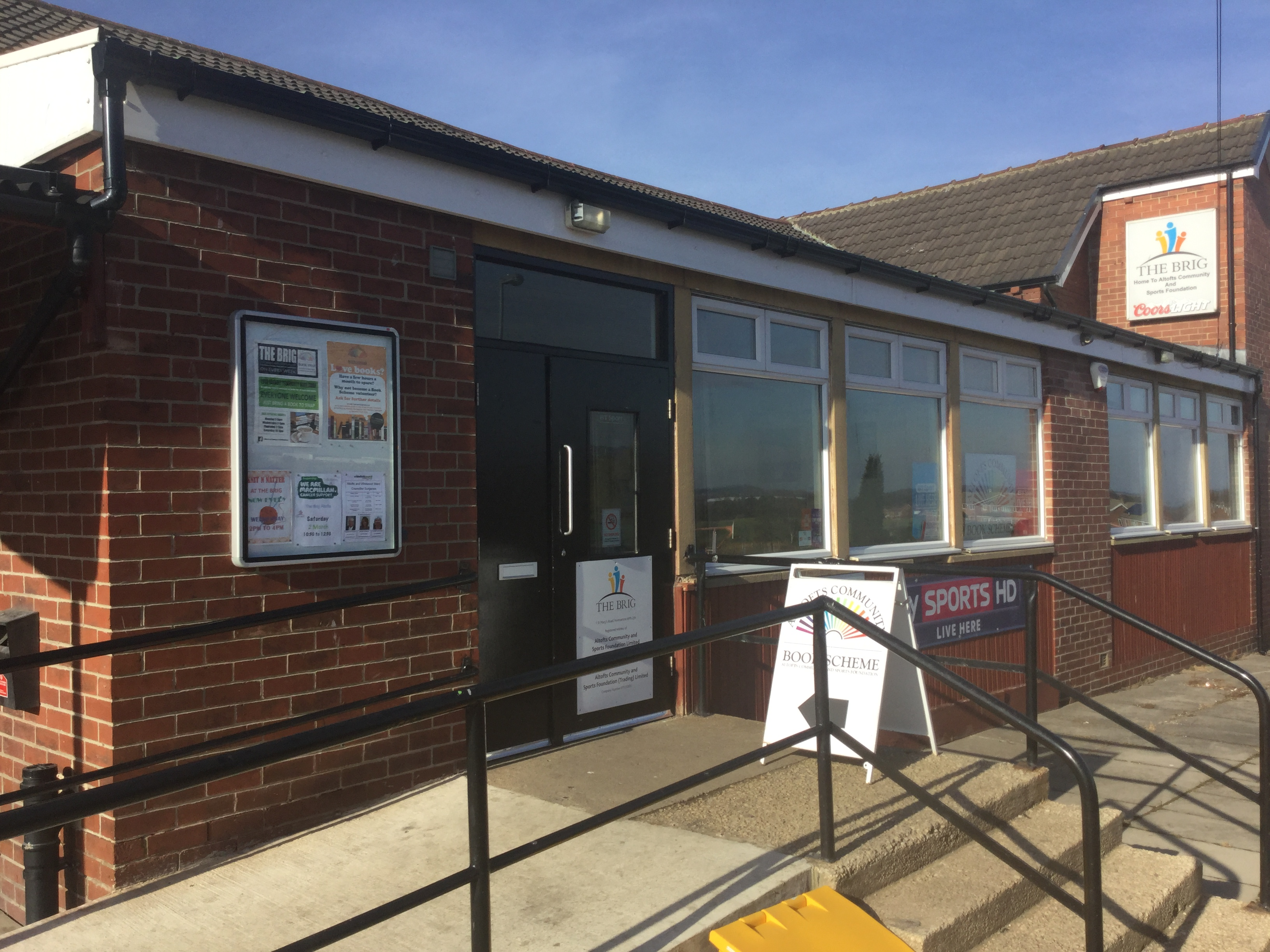
The Brig community hub

The Brig is home to many community groups including Altofts Juniors FC, Altofts Cycling Club, Readers group and Storytime, and the Altofts Book Swap is also based at The Brig, and it hosts an annual summer gala to promote local talent and community groups.

In the village there is also a post office, a butcher's shop, and a small number of shops and farms.

== Landmarks ==
Lower Altofts is an area at the lower end of the village. It had the longest unbroken row of three-storey terraced houses in Europe, Silkstone Row, until 1978, when it was demolished. There are now just two shorter rows of terraced houses in Lower Altofts on Pope Street.

== Education ==
Altofts' schools are Lee Brigg Infants School, Martin Frobisher Infants School, and Altofts Junior School, which celebrated its 30th anniversary in 2008.

== Religious sites ==
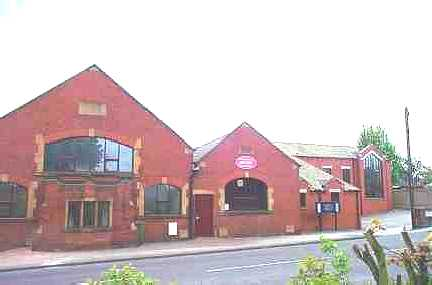
Altofts Methodist Church

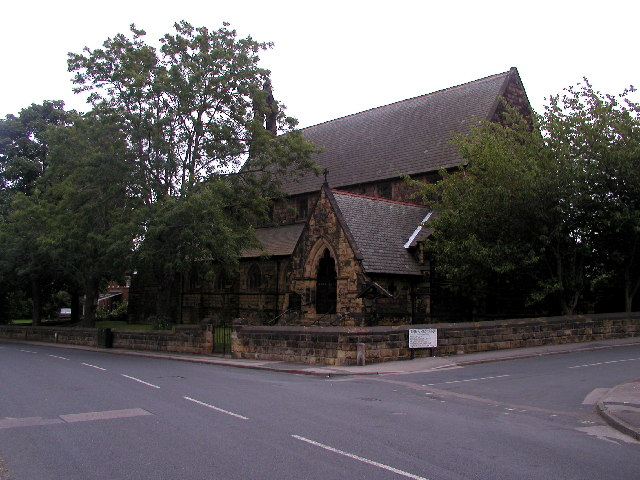
The Church of St Mary Magdalene

There are three churches. Altofts Methodist Church, opened in 1990, was built when the three Methodist congregations of Lower Altofts, Lock Lane and Upper Altofts amalgamated. The church is located on Church Road. The Church of St Mary Magdalene is the Anglican parish church for the village, and is Anglo-Catholic in tradition. Hebron Christian Fellowship is an independent church, also located on Church Road.

== Sport ==
Altofts Community Sports Club and playing fields provide for cricket, football and bowls. The Cricket Club plays at Lock Lane and is in the Bradford Cricket League. Altofts AFC, which was founded in the 1890s, plays in the West Yorkshire Association Football League.

== Notable people ==
- John Freeston, a Tudor barrister and benefactor, lived in Altofts for most of his life.
- Martin Frobisher, Elizabethan sea captain and adventurer, credited with the discovery of Frobisher Bay in Canada, was born in Altofts.
