= A638 road =

Road in England

Coordinates: 53.5053°N 1.08344°W

A638

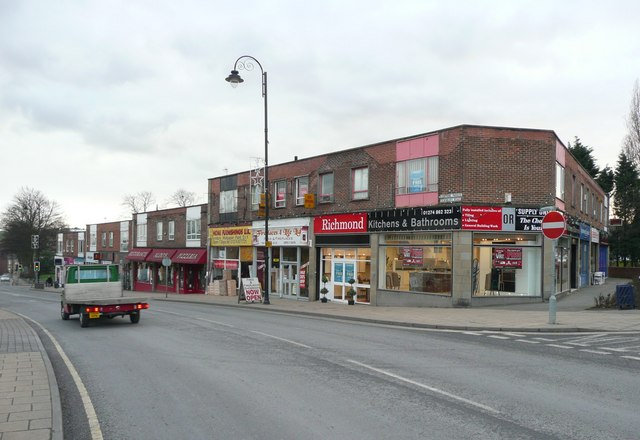
- Central Parade (part of Dewsbury Road – A638) in Cleckheaton

Route information
- Length: 55.4 mi (89.2 km)

Major junctions
- South end: Markham Moor
- A1; A57 A620 A634 A614 A631 A6182; A18 A630; A19 A635 A1(M) A6201 A628 A645 A655 A6194; A61 A636 A642; M1 A653 A652 A644; A62 A643; A58 M606 M62
- North end: Cleckheaton

Location
- Country: United Kingdom
- Primary destinations: Retford; Bawtry; Doncaster; Wakefield; Dewsbury

Road network
- Roads in the United Kingdom; Motorways; A and B road zones
← A637	→ A639

The A638 is a major road in England. It runs between the A1 at Markham Moor, Nottinghamshire and Chain Bar Interchange – Junction 26 of the M62 motorway, south of Bradford in West Yorkshire.

== History ==
The section of road between Markham Moor and Red House north of Doncaster which runs through the centre of Doncaster was originally the A1 before the Doncaster Bypass, a section of A1(M) was built.

The road used to continue to Odsal Top in Bradford but the road between Chain Bar and Odsal (Cleckheaton Road) has been de-classified from an A road.

== Route ==
=== Markham Moor to Doncaster ===
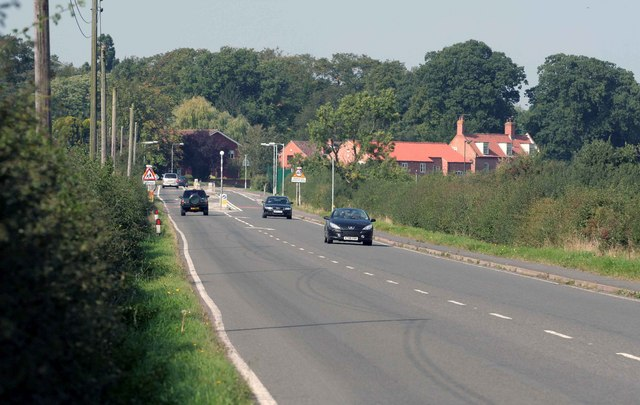
Between Gamston and Markham Moor

The route starts off as a non-trunk road at the Markham Moor interchange (previously a roundabout before 2008) in West Drayton. Previous to 1967, the A1 approached from the south on what is now the B1164. Previous to 1958, this small section would have been the A1, where it would have met the A57 from Lincoln opposite the Markham Moor Hotel then both roads were concurrent for a hundred yards, then the A57 took the road through West Drayton. When the West Drayton diversion opened in February 1957 (including the roundabout) as the A57, the A1 still went through Retford, until August 1961.

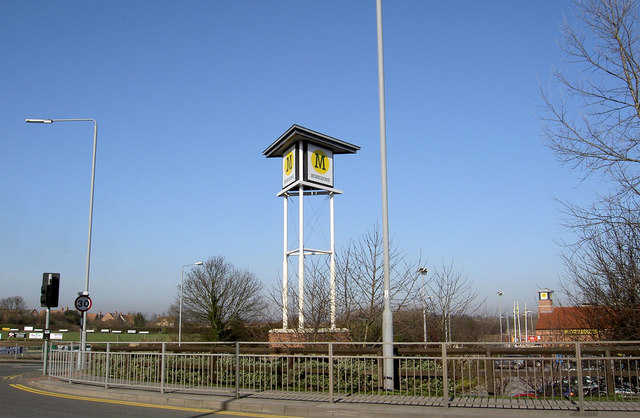
Morrisons at Retford

There is a right turn for Askham, then passes through Gamston, where there is a left turn for the B6387 near the Bramcote Lorne School, an independent preparatory school. It follows the River Idle, and passes to the east of Eaton, where there is a staggered crossroads, for Upton to the east, and it passes the Jamia Al-Karam, a Muslim boarding school. It enters the White Houses part of Retford as London Road, with a right turn for Nether Headon, passing The Whitehouses and the JET Whitehouses Service Station, a left turn for Ordsall, then crosses the East Coast Main Line. There is a crossroads, with the left for Thrumpton. It crosses the Sheffield to Lincoln Line, passes the former King Edward VI Grammar School on the right (now the Retford Oaks High School on a new site) opposite the Esso King Edwards Service Station, and there is a left turn for Albert Road (B6044), the main access for Retford railway station. It crosses the Cuckoo Way and the Chesterfield Canal as Arlington Way, passes the Sherwood Centre, the Bassetlaw Museum, and St. Swithun's church, and the A620 leaves to the north (for Gainsborough) at traffic lights. As Amcott Way it crosses the River Idle with Morrisons on the west bank of the river, and the A620 (for Worksop) leaves to the west at a roundabout. This part of Retford is West Retford. As North Road it passes the Texaco North Road Service Station (next to a Co-op), Retford Hospital, then the ambulance station on the right hand side.

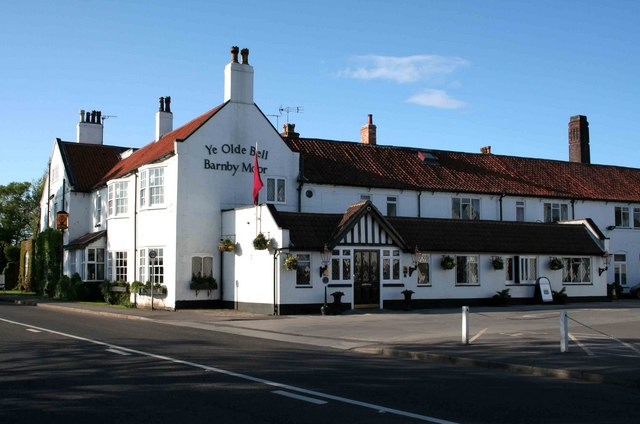
Ye Olde Bell at Barnby Moor on the Great North Road

There is the Sutton Cross Roads for Sutton cum Lound, to the north, and it crosses the ECML at Botany Bay Bridge. At Barnby Moor it meets the Old London Road from the south, then the A634 leaves to the west (for Blyth), opposite the Ye Olde Bell, a former coaching inn. It passes through Torworth where there is a right turn for Lound, and a left turn for Blyth, and passes The Huntsman. At this point for a few miles the East Coast Main Line follows directly 500 yards to the east. It crosses a disused railway at Scrooby and passes slightly to the west of the village. Scrooby was the home of William Brewster, leader of the Pilgrim Fathers. It crosses the River Ryton, joins the A614, a trunk road, at an awkward junction at Harworth Bircotes. It enters Bawtry and the Metropolitan Borough of Doncaster.

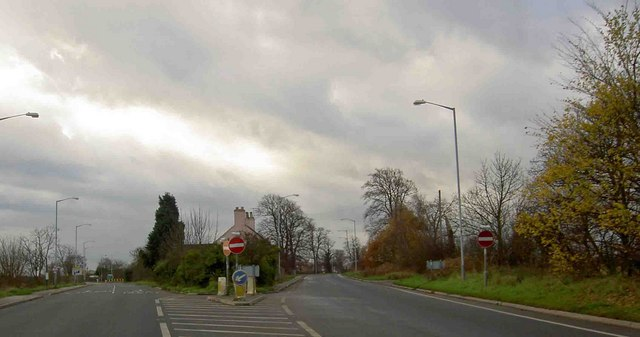
Meeting the A614 south of Bawtry

On the left hand side is Bawtry Hall, the former site of RAF Bawtry, the headquarters of 1 Group in the Second World War. The A631 joins from the east, then leaves to the left at the Total Corner Garage. The A614 leaves to the right (for Robin Hood Airport Doncaster Sheffield) as a non-trunk road, but the A638 continues to the left as a trunk road. It passes Bawtry library, and continues as a straight road most of the way to Doncaster, crossing the ECML, from the right. Bawtry was a Roman town between Lincoln and Doncaster on a branch of Ermine Street, and the A638 (former A1) follows all the way through Doncaster to the A1. It is the parish boundary between Bawtry to the left and Austerfield to the east, under the flight path of Robin Hood Airport to the north-east, then from the Blackfirs RSPCA South Yorkshire Animal Centre, the boundary with Rossington to the left. From the Best Western Mount Pleasant Hotel, it is the boundary with Auckley to the east. At Warren House Farm near Hurst Plantation, there is a main right turn for the airport, where the A638 enters the parish of Rossington, deviating from the Ermine Street to the west. It meets Sheep Bridge Lane (B6387) for Rossington to the left, at a Park and Ride on the left hand side next to Rossington Bridge Farm. Crossing the River Torne, it enters Doncaster itself. The club house for Doncaster Golf Club (The Warren golf course) is on the left.

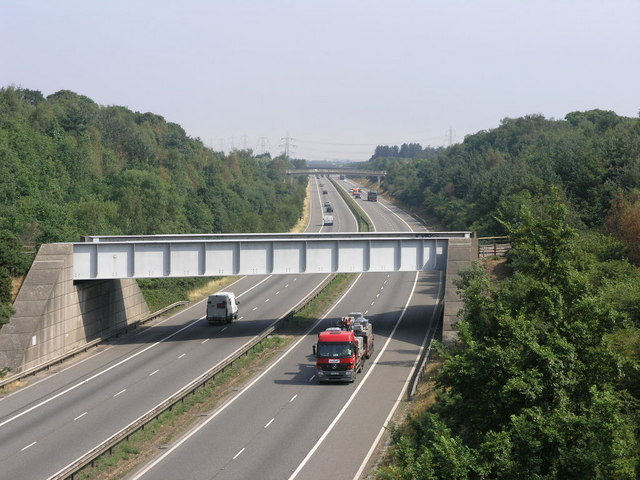
Crossing the M18 at Bessacarr

It crosses the M18, then the Doncaster to Lincoln Line, and the Esso Doncaster Service Station. It passes through Bessacarr as Bawtry Road, and at Cantley Bridge it meets Cantley Lane (B1396, for Robin Hood Airport) where it becomes a dual carriageway. It crosses a railway line, passes the JET Racecourse Service Station and The Dome Leisure Centre on the left, and there is a roundabout at Asda Doncaster at Gilwice Way to the left (for the A6182), and Doncaster Racecourse is to the right. It meets the A18, from the right, at a roundabout next to the Grand St Leger Hotel, and the former Great North Road continues straight ahead as South Parade through the town centre. The road follows the A18, and leaves the A18 at the next roundabout. As the non-trunk Trafford Way it passes the Texaco Trafford Way Star Service Station, meets the A630 at a roundabout, becoming a trunk road, which passes Doncaster railway station to the left, and under the Frenchgate Centre. The road used to leave at the junction next to the Frenchgate centre, (The old North Bridge, it has been reopened for outgoing traffic, incoming traffic is still restricted to public transport, taxis and emergency services).As Church Way it passes St George's Minster, Doncaster and leaves at the next roundabout, at the start of the A19 next to the new Doncaster College. It crosses on St George's Bridge over the River Don and the East Coast Main Line. At a large roundabout, it rejoins the former Ermine Street, and the A19 leaves to the north-east where a railway line crosses over the road.

=== Doncaster to Wakefield ===
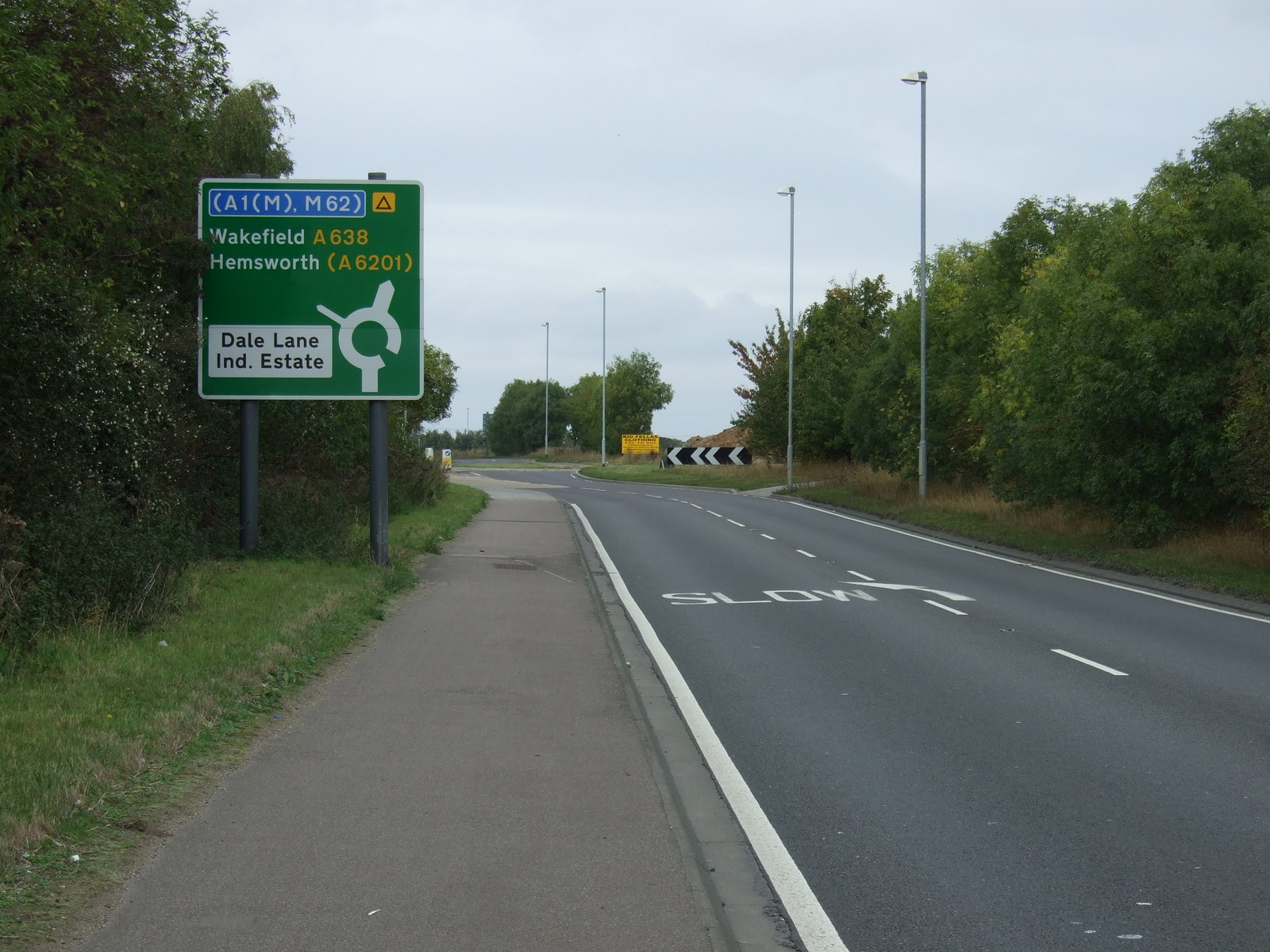
A638 towards Wakefield

As York Road the Centurion Retail Park and a Morrisons is on the right, and the JET Royal Blue Garage on the left. It crosses Lady Pitt's Bridge over a former track of the River Don. It crosses the Trans Pennine Trail. At Sunnyfields there is a junction for Barnsley Road (A635) to the left near the Rix Sun Inn Service Station and The Sun, where the road leaves Ermine Street, to the right, which continues as the Roman Ridge. It passes the Esso Sun Inn Service Station on the left, and continues through Scawthorpe, with the Don Valley Academy on the right, and meets Green Lane (B6422) to the left. It enters Highfields where there is the Highwayman Roundabout for Doncaster Lane (B1220) next to the Highwayman. It passes through Woodlands and then Adwick le Street. It meets the A1 and A1(M) at the Red House Interchange junction 38, formerly a roundabout before 1979. Ermine Street continues northwards along the A1. Before the bypass in August 1961, the A1 would have passed along the current A638 into Doncaster. Off the junction is a large distribution centre for B&Q.

From the A1, the A638 becomes a single-carriageway road and follows its former route, before it was extended to follow the former A1 from Markham Moor. It passes through Hampole and crosses the Leeds and Wakefield section of the ECML. There is a right turn for Skelbrooke near Little John's Well near the area known as Barnsdale. It enters the borough of Wakefield and crosses a former railway line. In North Elmsall parish there is a new roundabout for an industrial estate, and a roundabout for the new A6021, which leads to the Barnsdale Bar A1/A639 Roman Ridge junction. Previous to the building of this road, the A638 went through North Elmsall with a roundabout closer to Upton. There is a new roundabout with Minsthorpe Lane (B6474) further south, and the A638 now follows part of the former B6474, with a new T-junction for the B6474 near Upton. It continues to the north-west as Doncaster Road. There is a left turn for Hemsworth Marsh, and a right turn for Badsworth and on Badsworth Common it is crossed by the Dearne Valley Line at a 13' 9 (4.2m) low bridge.

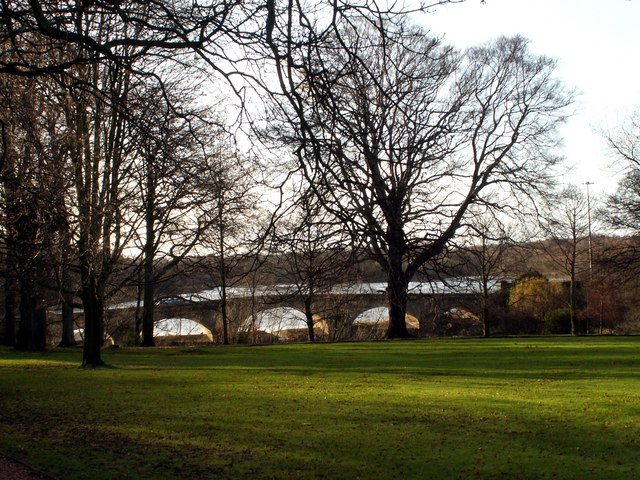
Nostell Bridge

It turns due west and enters Ackworth Moor Top, meeting Barnsley Road (A628) at a roundabout next to the Beverley Arms. As Wakefield Road it passes the Boot and Shoe and All Saints' church, there is a right turn, it passes the Total Ackworth Service Station and the Angel Inn, it crosses the former Brackenhill Light Railway and passes through Brackenhill. As Doncaster Road it meets the B6428 (for Featherstone to the north) at a roundabout at Hessle and Hill Top, and passes through Wragby, passing the Spread Eagle. At Huntwick with Foulby and Nostell it meets Garmill Lane (B6273) to the right, with a left turn for Nostell Priory. It passes through Nostell Park and across Upper Lake. It passes through Foulby, birthplace of John Harrison, of longitude fame.

It crosses Windmill Hill, with a right turn for Sharlston. There is a left turn for Crofton and it meets Pontefract Road (B6378) at crossroads next to the Crown Carveries Cock & Crown. It meets Weeland Road from the right – the western end of the A645 at the Q8 Oakdale Garage, then the B6378 from the left. It crosses the Pontefract Line, then passes the Shell Redbeck Services, next to the former Walton Colliery. It crosses a railway line, and at Warmfield cum Heath it meets Black Road (A655) from the right. Entering the town of Wakefield as Doncaster Road, it passes under a large railway bridge. There is a left turn for Agbrigg Road (B6389). It passes through Fall Ings, passing the BP Wakefield Service Station, crosses the Fall Ings Cut of the Calder and Hebble Navigation, and meets Barnsley Road (A61) from the south. It crosses the River Calder near the Chantry Chapel of St Mary the Virgin, Wakefield, and the A61 leaves to the north as Kirkgate and as the dual-carriageway Ings Road the A638 passes under a railway, carrying the Hallam Line and Huddersfield Line, then passes retail parks and meets Denby Dale Road (A636) at a roundabout next to the Royal Mail sorting office. It passes under the ECML, meets another section of the A636 from the south near the Cathedral Retail Park and splits into two one-way sections around Albion Mills Retail Park, partly as Quebec Street. It continues to the west near the Westgate Retail Park, concurrent with the A642, as Westgate End becoming single-carriageway. At Westgate Common, the road forks into Horbury Road (A642) to the south-west, and Dewsbury Road (A638) due west at St Michael's church.

=== Wakefield to Bradford ===
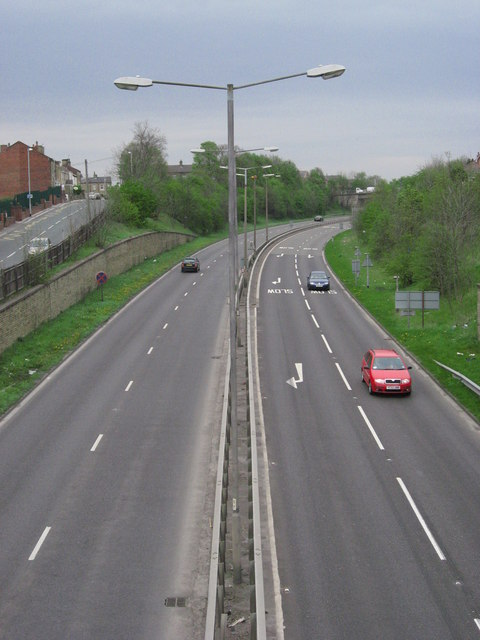
The Ossett Bypass

It passes a McDonald's and the Morrisons Wakefield Dewsbury Road on the right, opposite The Magnet, and at Borough Corner meets George-a-Green Road (B6475) from the south at crossroads. It passes the English Martyrs Catholic Primary School on the right, and climbs the hill out of Wakefield. It meets Broadway from the south and becomes Wakefield Road at the Old Malt Shovel. It passes the Shell Ossett and Roundwood Industrial Estate on the left, and becomes a dual-carriageway, built with the M1 junction 40 by Costain in October 1968. It passes a BP garage on the left, with the Leeds-Wakefield Holiday Inn on Queen's Drive, and the Silkwood Park business park and the Days Hotel Wakefield on the right. It meets the M1 at a roundabout and continues to the west as a dual-carriageway, passing through Gawthorpe. The former A638 continues through Ossett as the B6129. It becomes the single-carriageway Chancery Road at a roundabout with Leeds Road (B6128). At Chickenley it meets the former route, becoming Wakefield Road, entering the borough of Kirklees.

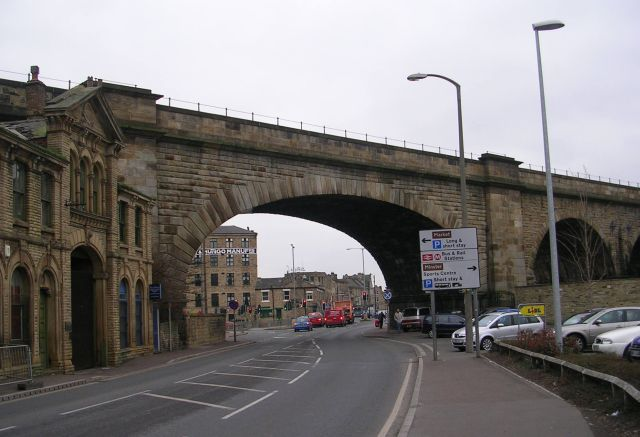
Leeds-Huddersfield Line in Dewsbury

At Earlsheaton there is a crossroads, and the road descends down the Calder valley into Dewsbury passing the BP Ossett Service Station. The A638 forms the Dewsbury Ring Road, with two sections – one trunked and one untrunked. The trunked section is Aldams Road, Vicarage Road and Rishworth Road, which meets Wilton Street (B6409). The untrunked section passes Dewsbury railway station and meets Leeds Road (A653). The two divide near Dewsbury Sainsbury's and the Rishworth Centre Retail Park. It passes under a railway bridge as Halifax Road, and passes a campus on the right of Kirklees College, the former Dewsbury Technical School of Art and Science. Further north it passes the Wheelwright Campus of Kirklees College – the former Wheelwright Grammar School for Boys. There is a left turn for Healds Road for Dewsbury and District Hospital. There is a crossroads for Dewsbury Gate Road near the Esso Halifax Road Garage in Staincliffe. It meets Batley Road (B6123) from the right next to the Junction Inn, becoming High Street. It passes Heckmondwike Grammar School and St James's church on the left, then passes through Heckmondwike town centre, meeting Market Street (B6117) from the left, and Northgate (B6117) from the right, passing Morrisons Heckmondwike on the left. It becomes Westgate and passes the imposing Flush Mills, home of Rieter Automotive, who make car furnishings.

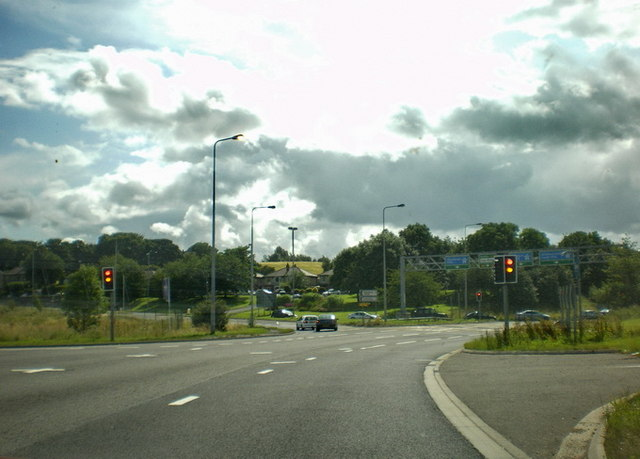
Northern terminus of the A638 at Cleckheaton

It passes the Texaco Flush Garage (former Gulf and Total) on the right, and meets the A62 (Leeds Road and Huddersfield Road), becoming Bradford Road near The Swan in Liversedge. It passes a BP (former Shell) Millbridge Filling Station on the left, and in Littletown it becomes a dual-carriageway, which destroyed much of the village centre when it was built. At Rawfolds it passes the Princess Mary Stadium and crosses the River Spen. As Dewsbury Road in Cleckheaton it meets the A643 at crossroads. It meets Whitcliffe Road (B6120) from the left, then Hunsworth Lane (B6121) from the right at Moorend. It passes the Spen Trading Estate on the right, and meets the M62, M606, and Whitehall Road (A58) at the Chain Bar Roundabout, where the road terminates.

The road from here used to pass north through Oakenshaw, which runs parallel next to the M606, and then Low Moor. At the Odsal Top roundabout (with the A6036 and A641, for Huddersfield), the road that continues on the opposite side of the roundabout is the B6380, and continues to Horton Bank Top, meeting the A647 near Horton Bank Country Park.

The M606 at one point was to be named the A638(M).

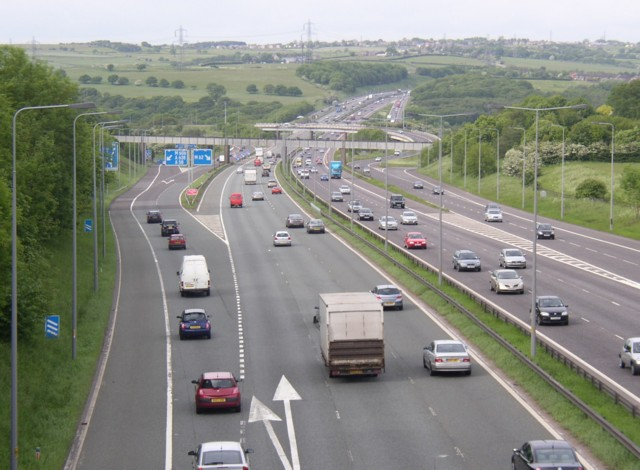
Chain Bar junction with the M62
