= Cyril Knowles (disambiguation) =

Cyril Knowles may refer to

- Cyril Knowles (1944 – 1991), English association (soccer) footballer
- Cyril Knowles (rugby league) (1915 – 1957), English rugby league footballer who played in the 1930s and 1940s, father of the association (soccer) footballer
- Cyril J. Knowles (1905–1961), British cinematographer
