= Ackworth, West Yorkshire =

Village in West Yorkshire, England

Ackworth
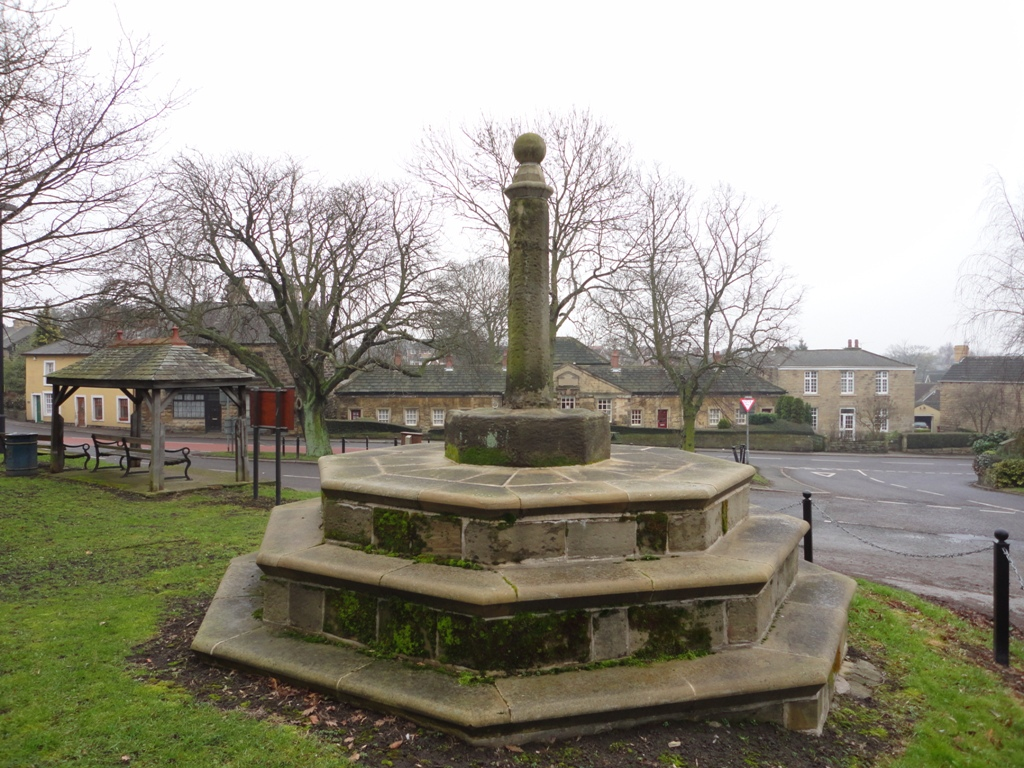
- The medieval cross in centre of High Ackworth

- Location within West Yorkshire
- Population: 7,049 (2011 census)
- OS grid reference: SE443176
- Civil parish: Ackworth
- Metropolitan borough: City of Wakefield
- Metropolitan county: West Yorkshire
- Region: Yorkshire and the Humber
- Country: England
- Sovereign state: United Kingdom
- Post town: Pontefract
- Postcode district: WF7
- Dialling code: 01977
- Police: West Yorkshire
- Fire: West Yorkshire
- Ambulance: Yorkshire
- UK Parliament: Normanton and Hemsworth

Ackworth is a village and civil parish in the metropolitan borough of Wakefield, West Yorkshire, England, between Pontefract, Barnsley and Doncaster on the River Went. It has four parts: High Ackworth, Low Ackworth, Ackworth Moor Top, and Brackenhill. The 2001 census gave it a population of 6,493, which rose to 7,049 at the 2011 census. There is also a city ward called Ackworth, North Elmsall and Upton, with a 2011 census population of 16,099.

== History ==
=== Name ===
The name of the village may derive from one of two sources. The first is from the Anglo-Saxon words ake or aken, meaning oak, and uurt, equivalent to "worth", meaning an enclosure or homestead. The other possibility is from the Anglo-Saxon name Acca, to make Acca's worth or Acca's enclosure. Several place names in the area show that the Anglo-Saxons had influence. Words such as "worth" and also "tun", meaning an enclosure or farmstead, are found in local names such as Badsworth, Hemsworth and Wentworth, and Fryston and Allerton. The name Ackworth was first recorded in the Domesday Book of 1086 as Aceuurde and is thought it have been formalised as 'Ackworth' in the 1800s.

=== Early history ===
The area around Ackworth may have been settled about 500–600 by settlers from modern-day Denmark, Germany and the Netherlands after the departure of the Romans from Britain. The Romans were active around Ackworth, the nearby town of Castleford being the location of Lagentium, a Roman fort. The A639 Roman road to York also runs close by; a Roman milestone was found near its junction with Sandy Gate Lane on the parish boundary with Pontefract. In terms of Christianity, the first church may have appeared in Ackworth between 750 and 800, a well-established tradition being that the monks of Lindisfarne, escaping the Norse invasion, stopped there about 875, bringing with them the body of Saint Cuthbert. Evidence of Norse settlement can also be found locally in place names such as Thorpe Audlin and Grimethorpe, with the Norse term thorpe meaning a small settlement or a farm.

==== Domesday Book ====
The earliest mention of the village appears in the 1086 Domesday Book: "Manor in Ackworth. Erdulf & Osulf have six carucates of land to be taxed, where there might be five ploughs. Humphry now holds it of Ilbert. [Humphry] himself has there one plough and a half, and fourteen villains, and two boors. There is a Church there, and priest; one mill, of sixteen pence. Value in King Edward's time four pounds, now three pounds. Domesday Book 107. Land of Ilbert de Lacy" According to Domesday, Ilbert de Lacy was Lord of a manor able to employ five ploughs. His vassal was the Humphrey mentioned in the book, who himself owned one-and-a-half ploughs (about a quarter of the manor). The rest was divided between two farmers as Humphry's tenants. De Lacy was a Norman knight, who received land for services to William the Conqueror and built the first earth and timber motte and bailey castle in nearby Pontefract. Domesday suggests Ackworth was small – 14 villagers and two smallholders – but as only heads of families were counted, a likelier population would have been 30–40.

=== Ackworth in the Middle Ages ===
Estate accounts for 1296 showed that Ackworth had developed by then. The Lord had 240 bondsmen working for him and the value of the mill had risen. Adam de Castleford had to pay 10 shillings (£0.5) rent for his land. His wife Isabella founded a Chapel of Our Lady in Ackworth Church in 1333. In 1341 the Inquisitiones Nonarum stated that the only inhabitants of Ackworth were working in agriculture. It has been speculated that the central village cross was erected by the Isabella de Castleford, who built the chapel in the church, which may date it around 1340. The cross itself was listed a grade II building in 1968, with a description as "late medieval", constructed as a "medieval shaft with a Tudor ball on top" and "prominently sited near junction with Pontefract road".

==== The Black Death and Plague ====
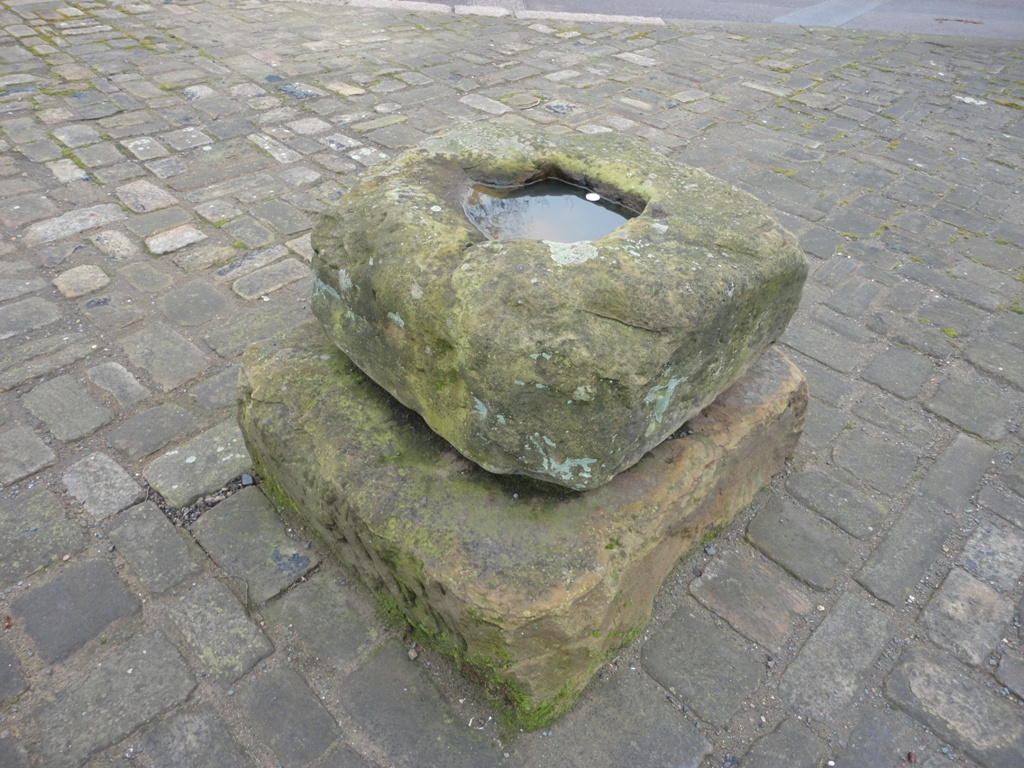
The Ackworth Plague Stone

One reason given for erecting the cross was as a memorial to plague victims, possibly of the Black Death of 1349, which would have killed many. The Black Death reached Southern England in 1348 and by 1350 had killed a third of England's population. In nearby Pontefract it was estimated that 40 per cent of the population died. A reminder of how communities communicated and traded despite the plague remains in the Ackworth plague stone, although it is thought that it dates from a further plague outbreak in 1705. Standing at the junction of Sandy Gate Lane on the road into Pontefract, the stone too is a Grade II listed monument. Plague stones were "receptacles for sterilising coins in vinegar, normally at or close to parish boundaries." This suggests that the current location of the plague stone was the outer rim of the parish. The plague in 1645 was said to have killed 153, the bodies being buried in a "burial field... crossed by the footpath from Ackworth to Hundhill." The area had possibly been used for mass burial after a skirmish earlier in the year between Roundhead and Royalist forces during the English Civil War. The bubonic plague of 1645 was not confined to Ackworth: in Leeds over 1,300 people died, and a further 245 were thought to have died "in and around the Wakefield area". One theory was that it had been brought in by civil-war soldiers. Another version was retold by Henry Thompson in A History of Ackworth School in its first 100 years. A well-loved monk went to Rome and became "smitten by the plague and died". The monk, from the priory at Nostell would preach at the medieval cross in the centre of the village and was described as a "noble soul with a kindly heart", admired by young and old alike. After succumbing to the plague in Rome, his body was returned and passed through Ackworth, where "nothing could satisfy the ignorant but faithful love of the old hearers" and the coffin was opened. The village was then stricken with plague and the stone on Castle Syke Hill became "for many months the only contact between them and the outside world". The book relates how "upon that stone the Ackworth purchaser dropped his money into a vessel of water, for which, a few hours afterwards, he found his return in merchandise." Of this the author comments, "We make no idle comment.... We tell the tale as it was told to us."

=== Battles and conflicts ===
The area round Ackworth saw several important battles, such as the 1460 Battle of Wakefield and the 1461 Battle of Towton during the Wars of the Roses. In 1489, four years after the War of the Roses ended, the new King Henry Tudor levied a tax that sparked an uprising in parts of Yorkshire. Thomas Howard, the Earl of Surrey, was sent to quash this after the Earl of Northumberland had been killed by the rebels. Howard subdued it and hanged the leaders in York. In 1492 a further uprising occurred in Ackworth, of which little is known except that Howard again subdued the insurgents. An earlier link could be made with the Battle of Winwaed in 655 between Penda of Mercia and Oswiu of Northumbria, King of Berenicia. This was mentioned by Bede, but the location of the battle is unknown. Options include Oswestry in Shropshire, Winwick in Lancashire, Whinmoor, north-east of Leeds, and between Wentbridge and Ackworth, where the A639, once a Roman road, crosses the River Went. The battle was pivotal, as Penda had been a powerful pagan king and the victory of the Christian Oswiu could be seen as effectively ending Anglo-Saxon paganism.

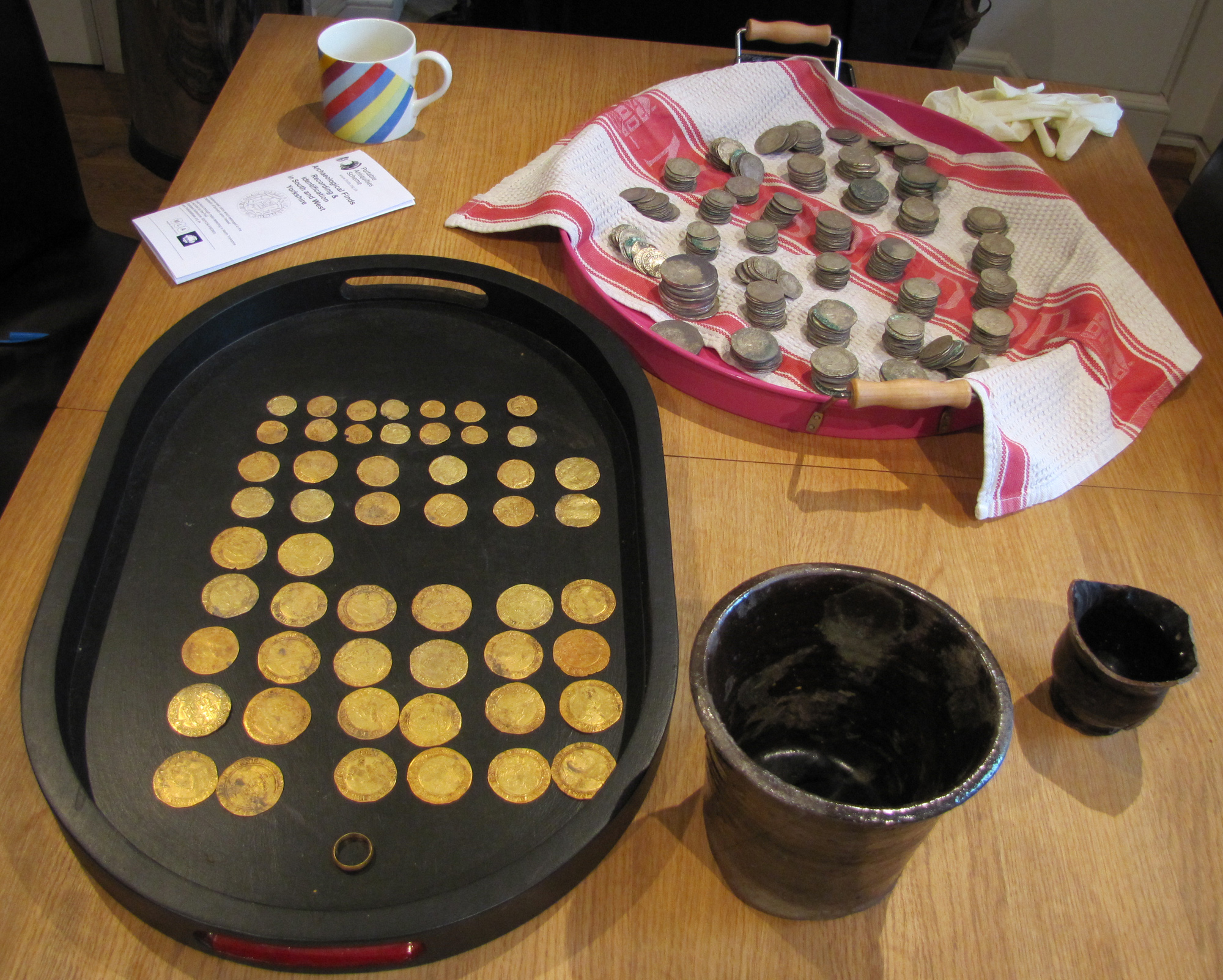
The Ackworth Hoard

The area around Ackworth was a hotbed for dissent against the Dissolution of the Monasteries by Henry VIII. A revolt led by Robert Aske, styled the Pilgrimage of Grace, was thought to have marched through Ackworth on its way to capture Pontefract Castle in 1536. The rebels were eventually defeated by an army sent by Henry, and its leaders hanged at Tyburn, including Sir Nicholas Tempest of Ackworth. The nearby Priory of St Oswald at Nostell was dissolved in 1540 and the land bought by Rowland Winn. During the English Civil War, the Ackworth area was strongly Royalist, with four divisions of volunteers raised from Pontefract and surrounding villages to garrison the castle. In 1645, Ackworth was occupied by Roundhead soldiers, who damaged the church and replaced the cross on top of the medieval cross in the centre of the village with the ball shape that still sits there.

The Ackworth Hoard is a hoard of 52 gold coins, 539 silver coins, and a gold posy ring found in a garden in Ackworth in April 2011. Thought to date from the Civil War period, it was declared treasure and was later acquired by Pontefract Museum.

Ackworth war memorial, opened in 1999, recalls the soldiers from Ackworth who died in the two world wars: 80 soldiers and 40 respectively.

=== Religious history ===
==== The Church of St Cuthbert ====
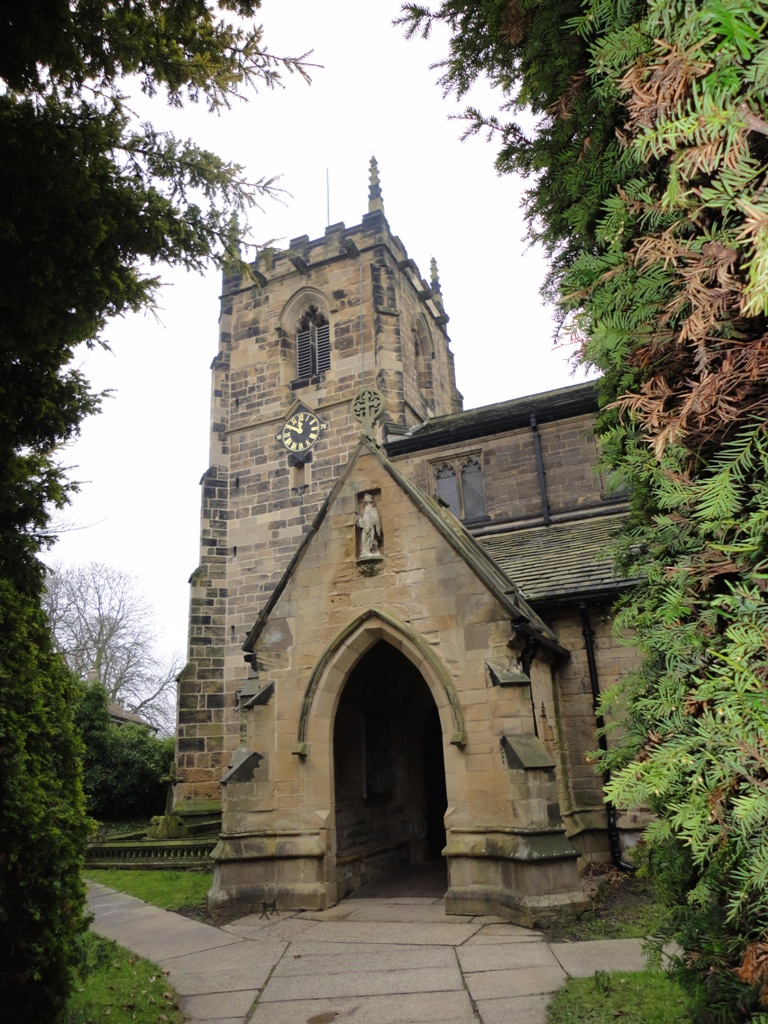
The Church of St Cuthbert in the centre of High Ackworth

The first recorded mention of a church in Ackworth appears in the 1086 Domesday Book: "There is a Church there, and priest." Before this, it is thought there had been a church in Ackworth from about 750. Ackworth is noted in the porch of a Durham church as one of the places where the body of St Cuthbert was taken by monks from Lindisfarne as they journeyed round the country with his body in 875–882. The Church of St Cuthbert in the centre of High Ackworth is believed to have been dedicated when the monks stopped on their pilgrimage. The original church is believed to have been replaced in the 14th century with a stone church and tower. The tower remains, but the church was renovated and restored in 1852–1854, when it is thought that the roof was lifted and additional windows added. All the present stained glass windows date from that time. The restoration followed a 1852 fire that damaged the nave and chapel. During the restoration, remains of an earlier Norman chapel were found. The church was declared a Grade II listed building in 1968.

==== Thomas Bradley ====
By the entrance to St Cuthbert's is a stone font with a Latin inscription that translates: "Thomas Bradley D. D. Rector. H. A. and T. C., Churchwardens. This font, thrown down in the war of the Fanatics, was set up again in the year 1663." Thomas Bradley was chaplain to Charles I of England and supposedly attended him at his execution in 1649. Bradley was given the living of Castleford and Ackworth by the King, but under the Commonwealth of England it was taken over by Thomas Birkbeck and H. Moorhouse. Bradley sided with the Royalists in the English Civil War and is recorded as part of Sir George Wentworth's division in the garrison of Pontefract Castle. The castle survived three successive sieges before Oliver Cromwell set up headquarters at Knottingley and bombarded it. It was the last Royalist stronghold to surrender, on 24 March 1649, two months after the beheading of Charles I. During the Commonwealth period it was reported that Bradley "suffered intensively"; his house was looted and "himself, his lady, and all his children turned out of doors to seek their bread in desolate places". A library entrusted to a John Lake of Castleford was "betrayed into the hands of his enemies". After the 1660 Restoration, the living was restored to him and Thomas Birkbeck in turn ejected from the Rectory. In 1666, Bradley built two almshouses for poor women on the village green. He died on 10 October 1673.

==== Wesleyan Chapel ====
Ackworth's Wesleyan Chapel was destroyed by fire on 25 September 2012.

=== Village history ===
==== Ackworth School and the Society of Friends ====
In A History of Ackworth School (1853), Ackworth was called a "neat agricultural village, situate about three miles from Pontefract, and closely bordering on the great Yorkshire manufactories." The book underlines its location: "It is so completely removed from any great line of road, either of the old system or the new, that but for the world-wide celebrity it has obtained from the Society of Friends from its association with their school, it is probable that, at least as it regards them, it would have slumbered in undisturbed repose amidst the well cultivated lands by which it is surrounded."

The school was opened by John Fothergill, described in the book as an "eminent physician of London and a man of much influence in the Society of Friends". Originally built as a branch of the Foundling Hospital in London, work started in 1757 and cost about £13,000. The governors of the "Hospital for the Maintenance and Education of Exposed and Deserted Young Children" had already established branches in Shrewsbury, Chester and Westerham. Their move to Ackworth was in view of the "great advantages from having one amongst the active and enterprising people of the northern counties." The hospital eventually closed in 1773 and remained empty for several years, during which time it seems to have avoided being turned into a "lunatic asylum" or "being sold and taken down for the materials." It was on hearing that the building may be "disposed of" that Fothergill bought it along with 85 acres of surrounding lands for £7,000. This purchase in 1777 was fully approved by the Society of Friends in 1778 and the school set up in 1779. Fothergill died in 1780, by which time 80 girls and 150 boys were being taught there.

===== The Foundling Hospital =====
Of its time as a foundling hospital, A History of Ackworth School paints an unflattering picture, in which "disease and death carried off great numbers annually," due to "starvation, and even murder, on the part of nurses who had the care of the infants, and of masters to whom the elder children were apprenticed." This "added to the mortality and, though the evidence is abundant of the untiring efforts of the directors to care for the children whilst in the hospital, and to protect their rights when they were apprenticed, evils and oppressions, unnumbered and insurmountable, paralyzed their exertions and the establishment was given up." Children were sent to Ackworth from London and other areas in which there was a branch of the hospital, with the children made to work, as "idleness was the parent of vice," or so it was seen by the governors. In 1759 a "woollen manufactory" was established at the hospital, with children spinning and weaving a cloth that soon became in demand, so much so that in 1762 profits were a significant £500. Meanwhile, other children worked on the farm, and all were taught to mend their own clothes. Whilst at the hospital, attempts were made to place the children as "apprentices" with business owners in the local area. At times the demand for apprentices was so high that the steward of the hospital, Richard Hargreaves, wrote to the London board asking for more children to be sent. The high demand for apprentices in turn led to checks on those taking the apprentices being relaxed, despite the instruction to ensure that all applicants for apprentices should be tested for suitability. As the demand grew and checks became rarer, "men unsuitable for the trust" were able to obtain credentials and then "treat the children they obtained on the strength of them, with little short of barbarity, and in more than one case murderous cruelty." Some children would be apprenticed as young as 6 and 7 until they reached 24, although in 1768 this changed to 21. (Note: There were many tales of cruelty to the apprentices after they were placed away from the hospital. In 1765 a Mr Brown of Leeds took 74 girls, all seven years old, and set them to work in his cloth business. Of the original 74, 22 died and an inspection revealed that the survivors were in a "dreadful condition of health", having to stand up all day, so much so that they had become weak in the hips, thighs and knees, meaning that they could only "with difficulty crawl over the floor". The sanitary arrangements were in a "shocking condition" and the sleeping arrangements "very unfit to refresh those weary limbs that have been kept the whole day to hard labour." The surviving children were returned to Ackworth. Another example was a tile smith from Sheffield indicted for murdering his apprentice, a boy named Nixon, yet found not guilty. In 1771 William Butterworth was accused of murdering one apprentice, Jemima Dixon, after treating them all in what was described as an "inhuman" way. A History of Ackworth School during its first 100 years describes this: "He had starved them within little short of their lives, had beaten their heads with shuttles, kicked them in the most brutal of all methods, and subjected the little murdered one to the most revolting punishments that an utterly malignant nature could devise."A History of Ackworth School during its first 100 years, chapter 1.)

===== John Fothergill =====
After the foundling hospital closed in 1773, John Fothergill, who had arranged the purchase in 1777, turned the building into a school for the Society of Friends. Fothergill, a prominent Quaker born in Wensleydale, educated at Sedbergh School and apprenticed as an apothecary in Bradford. He studied medicine in Edinburgh, graduating in 1736 before moving to London to set up a practice. He was a keen botanist and developed an extensive garden at his home at Rooke Hall in Upton. A selection of some 2,000 sketches of his flowers and plants were sold after his death and eventually became the property of the Empress of Russia. Fothergill was a contemporary of Benjamin Franklin and took an interest in relations between England and the American Colonies, which were on the verge of war at the time. He had helped establish schools in New York and Philadelphia, and though never visiting the colonies, often saw patients crossing the Atlantic to seek his advice as a physician. His relation with Franklin was formed as Franklin visited Europe to try to find a settlement between the two countries. Fothergill wrote a paper on how the two sides might agree, and this was accepted by Franklin, but rejected by the British government. Fothergill intended Ackworth School to be a "boarding school for the education of children whose parents were not rich." He took a great interest in the running it, often travelling from London to serve on the committee and help with expenses, before his death in 1780. A hall built at the school in 1899 with seating for 400 people was named Fothergill Hall.

== Geography ==
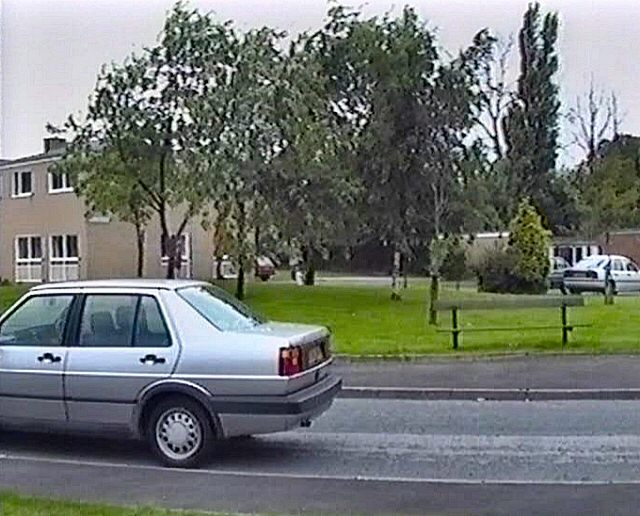
Chiltern Drive

At 53°30′0″N 1°20′0.8″W Ackworth is bounded by the City of Wakefield to the west, Pontefract to the north, with the villages of Thorpe Audlin and Kirk Smeaton to the east and Hemsworth to the south. The small River Went cuts through the village, as do the main A638 Doncaster to Wakefield road and the A628 from Barnsley to Pontefract. The underlying geology round High Ackworth consists of grey mud and silt stones associated with the Bolsovian series of rocks from the Upper Carboniferous period. An archaeological survey in 2008 described the soils as "well developed based on a pale orange silty clay natural probably glacially developed outwash upon which has developed a pale grey silty clay subsoil and a silty loam topsoil."

== Demography ==
The census of 2001 counted a population of 6,364 – 49.2 per cent male, 50.8 per cent female. The census statistics compared Ackworth with the rest of the Wakefield district and with the rest of England. In ethnicity, 97.7 per cent classified themselves as "white" – much higher than the national average of 90.9 per cent. In religion, 79.2 per cent of people classified themselves as "Christian" (national average: 71.7 per cent) and 11 per cent as of "no religion" (national average 14.6 per cent and district average of 11.7 per cent). The proportion of "economically active", at 67.8 per cent, was higher than that of the Wakefield district (64.3 per cent) and the national average (66.9 per cent). Educationally, the figure of 21.5 per cent for those with a degree-level qualification or higher was significantly higher than the 12.5 per cent for the rest of the Wakefield district (national average: 19.9 per cent).

Year	1801	1811	1821	1831	1841	1851	1881	1891	1901	1911	1921	1931	1951	1961	2001
Population	1,432	1,322	1,575	1,660	1,828	1,835	2,222	2,647	3,394	4,183	4,831	4,370	4,360	4,089	6,364

== Economy ==
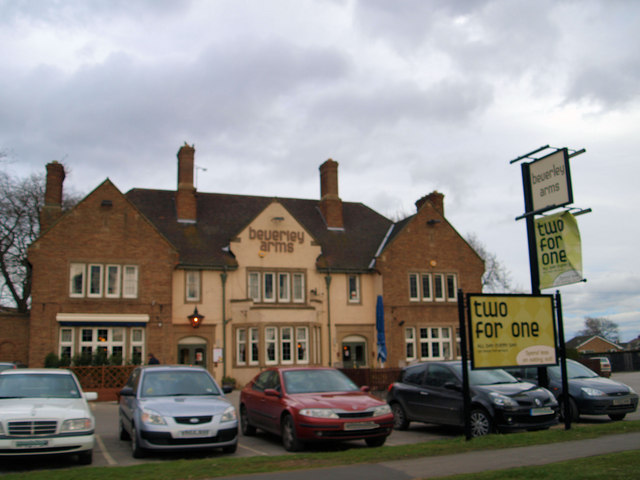
Beverley Arms Pub

=== Agriculture ===
Agriculture played an important role in developing the Ackworth area from the times it was first settled. Other place names in the area indicate that farming was a key feature in areas around Ackworth such as Badsworth and Hemsworth. Norse place names also indicate that this continued into the period of Scandinavian settlement, when places appeared with the name "thorpe", meaning a small homestead or a farm. Domesday noted that Ackworth had a mill and that the land could employ five ploughs. Accounts from 1296 show the mill as still important to the community, as its value had gone up. In 1341 the 'Inquisitiones Nonarum' noted that the only people living in Ackworth were those working in agriculture. The census of 1831 showed "agricultural labourer" as the commonest occupation, with a total of 100 men over the age of 20 employed in it. The second most populous was "retail and handicrafts" with 90 employees. There were 29 people classed as "farmers employing labourers" and 13 as "farmers not employing labourers". In the 1881 census, agriculture was still the second commonest employment in the area: 106 men and 1 woman. The commonest by this time for men was "workers in various mineral substances", and for women "domestic services or offices".

=== Stone quarrying ===
Quarrying was also important around the areas of Moor Top and Brackenhill. There was a long tradition of quarrying and masonry, and the production of building stone and high-quality grindstones used in agriculture and tool-making. Saywell (1894) describes Brackenhill as "almost entirely inhabited by stoneworkers" and Moor Top consisting of "several good houses, the rest are the cottages of miners and quarryworkers". Saywell describes "extensive quarrying" in the south and south-west of the Ackworth area, with stone running "near the surface" in many areas. He calls Ackworth stone "good, but in places... exceptionally soft and unfit for building purposes, which accounts for so many faults". The 1848 Topographical History of Great Britain notes "extensive quarries" of stone found in Moor Top, with an abundant supply of "freestone of excellent quality".

The first stone quarry was said to have been opened by John Askew, whose initials supposedly appear on the lintel of the Masons Arms, a pub in Moor Top, one of the parish's oldest buildings. Green, in his 1910 Historical Antiquities of Ackworth, states that quarrying was carried out as early as 1611. In 1927 Kelly's directory of the West Riding confirmed that quarrying was still going strong and hinted that the stone was received by a global market: "At Moor Top and Brackenhill are several large quarries, from which great quantities of stone are sent to all parts of England and abroad." Brackenhill was still described as a place where men employed by the stone quarries dwelt, alongside those working in the Hemsworth colliery. The working men's club and institute in Moor Top was built in 1907 at a stated cost of £1,750.

=== Coal mining ===
Saywell (1894) notes that "coal abounds in the vicinity" and tells how in 1860, an experimental bore of 153 feet was drilled in Long Lane, but coal was "not reached". However, "rich veins of iron are known to exist, at certain points, especially in Low Ackworth, inasmuch as many of the natural water springs are strongly oxidised." Picturing Ackworth in 50 years' time, he surmised that "it is not a too great stretch of imagination to [say] the picturesque village of Ackworth will have become one of the busiest mining centres of the West Riding of Yorkshire."

==== Hemsworth Colliery ====
Hemsworth Colliery, sunk in 1876, was initially called Fitzwilliam Main. By 1879 the pit employed over 300 men and boys, who travelled there from Kinsley, Hemsworth, Ackworth and Crofton. In 1879 an explosion killed five people, including three from Brackenhill. The Wakefield Express described how one of the men, John Mann, said he suffered a "compound fracture of the skull and also a scalp wound, his right arm had been fractured, and he was burnt in a shocking manner on the head, face, chest and back." It added that "the poor fellow expired about nine o'clock the same night." After the disaster, the colliery was taken over by the Hemsworth Colliery Coal Company in 1880, went into liquidation in 1890, and was in turn bought by a New Hemsworth Colliery Coal Company. In 1904 this became Fitzwilliam-Hemsworth Collieries and in 1907 just Hemsworth Colliery. Kelly's directory of 1927 noted that the area of Brackenhill was "inhabited chiefly by the men employed in the stone quarries and the Hemsworth colliery." A colliery was also sunk in Ackworth around 1910–1912.

== Transport ==
The village sits astride two main roads, the A638 between Wakefield and Doncaster and the A628 between Barnsley and Pontefract. The Angel pub and the Boot & Shoe were at one time stopping places for stage coaches as they made their way through the village, a route which would have taken them through Bell Lane, at one time a main thoroughfare, which even now has an old stone signpost at its junction.

=== Rail services ===
Several railway stations once served the village, whose location in relation to them was given in 1927 as "3 miles from Hemsworth station on a branch line of the London and North Eastern Railway from Doncaster to Wakefield, 3 miles south of Pontefract, 2 [miles] from the Featherstone station on the Wakefield and Goole branch of the Lancashire and Yorkshire Railway, and 1 mile from Ackworth station on the Swinton and Knottingley branch of the London, Midland and Scottish and London and North Eastern railways." Ackworth Station was located in Low Ackworth, on the road to East Hardwick, and closed in 1951. There was also a goods station at Ackworth Moor Top opened by the Brackenhill Light Railway in 1914 and closed in 1962. It ran from Brackenhill Junction to Hemsworth Colliery and was mainly a goods service, running only 3¼ miles. The route can still be seen in places: the first mile from Brackenhill Junction to Cherry Tree Farm is used by railway maintenance road vehicles and the section from Mill Lane to Kinsley Common as a cycle path.

== Education ==
=== Schools in Ackworth ===
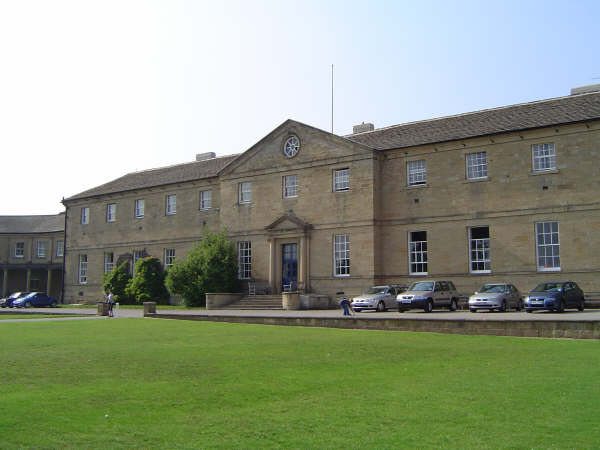
Ackworth School

Ackworth's schools include Ackworth School, a Quaker-run boarding school and day school for pupils aged 2–18. The three primary schools are Ackworth Mill Dam Junior and Infants, Bell Lane Junior and Infants and Ackworth Howard Church of England Junior and Infants school. 'Oakfield Park' is for students of 11–19 with learning difficulties.

School	Type/Status	OfSTED
Ackworth School	Boarding School	SC041297
Oakfield Park School	Community Special School	133719
Ackworth Mill Dam	Primary School	130966
Ackworth Howard	Primary School	130977
Bell Lane	Primary School	130965

== Notable people ==
The Yorkshire and England fast bowler, Graham Stevenson, was born in Ackworth. John Gully, the pugilist, horseracer and Member of Parliament, is buried at High Ackworth in his private burial ground.

Luke Howard, amateur meteorologist and namer of clouds, lived at Ackworth Court. His daughter Rachel founded the Howard School, behind which is a Plymouth Brethren burial ground.

Theodore Kitching, Secretary to General William Booth and a Commissioner in The Salvation Army, was born in Ackworth in 1866.

After being evicted from a house owned in Berkshire, singer Dorothy Squires was asked to stay at the home of a local fan in the village, where she lived from 1988 until the host's death in 1995.

Dave Cooper and Graham Bilbrough, members of the 1970s TV and chart group Child, are residents of Ackworth.

== See also ==
- Listed buildings in Ackworth, West Yorkshire
