= Mark Crook =

English footballer

Personal information
- Date of birth: 29 June 1903
- Place of birth: Morley, England
- Date of death: 1977 (aged 73–74)
- Position: Outside right

Senior career*
Years	Team	Apps	(Gls)
- Wombwell
1925–1928	Blackpool	51	(12)
1929	Swindon Town	1	(0)
1929–1934	Wolves	78	(14)
1935	Luton Town	5	(1)
- * Club domestic league appearances and goals

Mark Stanley Crook (29 June 1903 – 1977) was an English professional footballer. An outside right, he played in the Football League for Blackpool, Swindon Town, Wolves and Luton Town.

After his playing career, Mark set up a pioneering feeder team for Wolves in his native South Yorkshire. It proved to be extremely successful with Crook helping to identify 114 professional footballers. Crook took many players on trial for his Northern Intermediate League team prior to them signing for Wolves.

Among his best finds were Roy Swinbourne, Ron Flowers, Steve Daley, Cyril Knowles, Peter Knowles, Bob Hatton, Gerry Taylor, Alan Sunderland, Terry Cooper and Martin Patching.

A blue plaque to celebrate his achievements was added to Cortonwood Miners’ Welfare in May 2025 and a book, Feeding The Wolves, detailing his full career was released later that year.
