= Brackenhill =

Village in West Yorkshire, England

Coordinates: 53.642°N 01.356°W

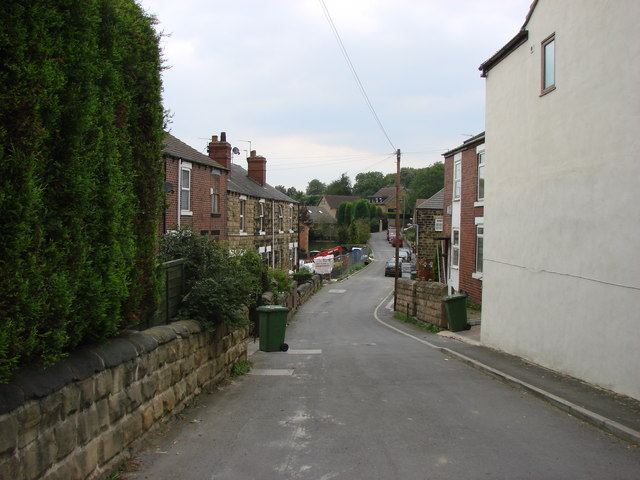
- Bracken Hill, a street in the village

- Location within West Yorkshire
- OS grid reference: SE427164
- Metropolitan borough: Wakefield
- Metropolitan county: West Yorkshire
- Region: Yorkshire and the Humber
- Country: England
- Sovereign state: United Kingdom
- Post town: PONTEFRACT
- Postcode district: WF7
- Dialling code: 01977
- Police: West Yorkshire
- Fire: West Yorkshire
- Ambulance: Yorkshire

Brackenhill is a village in West Yorkshire, England, which forms part of Ackworth parish. It is situated on the A638 road on the eastern bank of Hessle Beck, west of Ackworth Moor Top and north of Fitzwilliam Country Park.

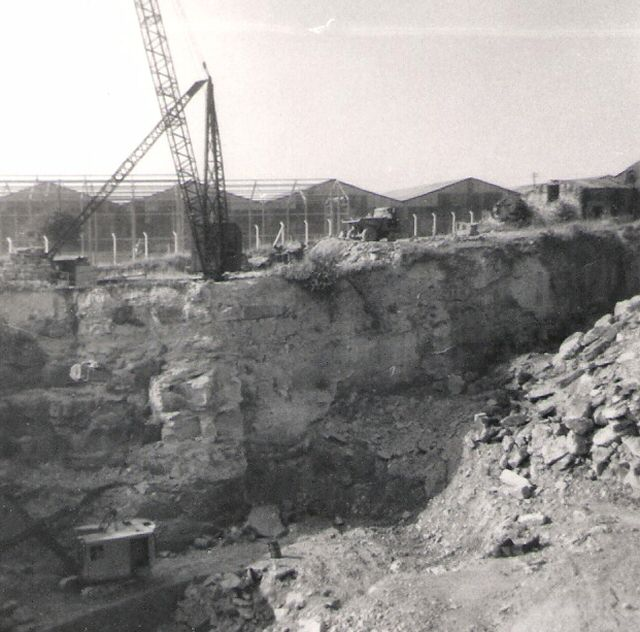
Brackenhill quarries in operation

A major industry in Brackenhill was quarrying, and at the end of the 19th century the majority of the male inhabitants of the village were occupied in the quarries. The stone is counted among the Pennine Upper Coal Measures which originated in the Carboniferous age. Quarried materials include magnesian limestone and sandstone. The quarries were served from 1914 to 1962 by the Brackenhill Light Railway, a subsidiary of the London and North Eastern Railway. It branched off the line between Sheffield and York east of Ackworth and joined the line between Wakefield and Doncaster at Hemsworth Colliery near Fitzwilliam. Brackenhill inhabitants also worked in Hemsworth Colliery.
