= Cyril Knowles (rugby league) =

English rugby league footballer

Personal information
- Full name: Cyril Knowles
- Born: c. second ¼ 1915; Hemsworth district, Wakefield, England
- Died: c. fourth ¼ 1957 (aged 42); Hemsworth district, Wakefield, England

Playing information
- Position: Fullback
Club
Years	Team	Pld	T	G	FG	P
1934–37	Wakefield Trinity	65	0	95	0	190
1937–49	York	275	5	469	0	953
1940(guest)	→ Featherstone Rovers	1	1	0	0	3
	Total	341	6	564	0	1146
- Relatives: Cyril Knowles (son); Peter Knowles (son)

Cyril Knowles (c. second ¼ 1915 – c. fourth ¼ 1957) was an English professional rugby league footballer who played in the 1930s and 1940s. He played at club level for Fitzwilliam Juniors ARLFC, Wakefield Trinity, York and Featherstone Rovers (World War II guest), as a fullback.

== Background ==
Cyril Knowles' birth was registered in Hemsworth district, Wakefield, West Riding of Yorkshire, England, he lived in Fitzwilliam, Wakefield c. 1936, and his death aged 42 was registered in Hemsworth district, Wakefield, West Riding of Yorkshire, England.

== Playing career ==
=== Club career ===
Cyril Knowles was signed by Wakefield Trinity during August 1934, made his début for Wakefield Trinity during November 1934, he played his last match for Wakefield Trinity during the 1937–38 season, he was transferred from Wakefield Trinity to York during October 1937 to replace Tommy Dingsdale, he made his début for York and scored 2-goals against Halifax on Saturday 9 October 1937, and he made his début for Featherstone Rovers against York on Tuesday 26 March 1940.

== Family ==
Two of Knowles' children became footballers, being Cyril Knowles and Peter Knowles.
