= Listed buildings in Lound, Nottinghamshire =

Lound is a civil parish in the Bassetlaw District of Nottinghamshire, England. The parish contains six listed buildings that are recorded in the National Heritage List for England. All the listed buildings are designated at Grade II, the lowest of the three grades, which is applied to "buildings of national importance and special interest". The parish contains the village of Lound and the surrounding area. All the listed buildings are in the village, and consist of houses, farmhouses and a war memorial.

== Buildings ==
Name and location	Photograph	Date	Notes
The Hall; 53.36602°N 0.96122°W		Mid 18th century	The house, later used for other purposes, is in brick with a moulded cornice and a hipped slate roof. There are three storeys and six bays. The central doorway is flanked by Doric half-columns, marginal lights and Doric pilasters, and has a fanlight, an entablature, and a shaped segmental pediment. The windows are sashes with keystones.
Alpha House and outbuilding 53.36638°N 0.96121°W		c. 1800	The house is in rendered brick on a plinth, with quoins, a floor band, a moulded cornice, an eaves band and a slate roof. There are two storeys and attics, and three bays. The windows are sashes, and there are two doorways, one with a segmental head. To the left is a two-storey single-bay lean-to, and further to the left is a single-storey outbuilding with a pantile roof.
Alpha Farmhouse; 53.36949°N 0.96128°W	—	Early 19th century	The farmhouse is in red brick, with a floor band, dogtooth eaves and a pantile roof. There are two storeys and an attic, and three bays. On the front is a central doorway with a plain surround, and sash windows, all under segmental arches. To the right, and recessed, is a two-storey single-bay extension with casement windows under segmental arches, and at the rear is a lean-to extension.
Yew Tree Farmhouse; 53.36386°N 0.96154°W	—	Early 19th century	The farmhouse is in painted brick with dentilled eaves and a pantile roof. There are two storeys and three bays. The central doorway has a moulded surround and a fanlight, and the windows are sashes.
Highfield House; 53.36745°N 0.96589°W	—	1839	The house, which was extended in 1928, is rendered and painted, and has a modillion cornice, a hipped slate roof, and two storeys. The west front has a plinth, three bays, a central porch with clustered columns and a doorway with a fanlight. This is flanked by two-storey bay windows, and the other windows are sashes. The north front has seven bays, the left two bays with parapets and the right bay with urns on the corners. Above the doorway is a frieze with putti, a cornice on consoles, initials and a date. To the left is a projecting wing, also with initials and a date.
War memorial 53.36641°N 0.96148°W		1920	The war memorial consists of an obelisk in light grey Scottish granite with a splayed base, on a plinth in darker grey granite, on a base of two steps. On the plinth are inscriptions and the names of those who served and those who were lost in the two World Wars.
