= Peter Knowles =

English footballer

Personal information
- Date of birth: 30 September 1945 (age 81)
- Place of birth: Fitzwilliam, West Riding of Yorkshire, England
- Position: Forward

Youth career
- 1961–1962: Wath Wanderers

Senior career*
Years	Team	Apps	(Gls)
1962–1969	Wolverhampton Wanderers	174	(61)
1967	→ Los Angeles Wolves (guest)	12	(3)
1969	→ Kansas City Spurs (guest)	8	(5)
Total		194	(69)

International career
1966–1968	England U23	4	(1)
Father	Cyril Knowles
Relatives	Cyril Knowles (brother)
- * Club domestic league appearances and goals

Peter Knowles (born 30 September 1945) is an English former professional footballer who played as a forward. He spent his career at Wolverhampton Wanderers, where he became a popular player, scoring around 101 goals in all competitions. He voluntarily ended his football career in 1970 after he became a Jehovah's Witness. He is the son of rugby league player Cyril Knowles, and the younger brother of fellow professional footballer Cyril Knowles.

== Career ==
=== Early career ===
Knowles was born in Fitzwilliam, West Riding of Yorkshire, into a family which was originally Rugby league-oriented, as his father played for Wakefield Trinity. However, the main sport in the family quickly changed to football as he and his brother, Cyril Knowles, proved to have significant football talent. Peter's talent was spotted by Mark Crook who operated the feeder team, Wath Wanderers, which trained youth players primarily for Wolverhampton Wanderers. In 1961, aged 16, Knowles spent a year with the youth outfit, playing under supervision from Wath's coach, Mark Crook. Knowles quickly caught the attention of Wolves, who in 1962 signed the 17-year-old on a six-year contract.

=== Wolverhampton Wanderers ===
The Wolves side he joined was just starting to slip from their position towards the top of English football. Therefore, manager Stan Cullis gave him his debut early in the 1963–64 season, in a victory over Leicester City. He scored his first goal a game later, against Bolton Wanderers in a 2–2 draw. Toward the close of the season he represented England at the 1964 UEFA European Under-18 Championship held in the Netherlands. Knowles scored in the final as England beat Spain 4-0.

In the 1964–65 season, Wolves were relegated in last-but-one place. However, it was that season which saw Knowles emerge as a top class footballer. The teenager finished the season with six goals and set up many others. Despite his good form for Wolves, he was disappointed at the relegation and asked for a transfer. This request was rejected, allowing Knowles to build upon his success at Wolves. The departure of Stan Cullis, the man who originally gave Knowles his chance, was a factor in his request to leave Molineux. Andy Beattie took over as care-taker manager but was himself sacked after a 9-3 humiliation to Southampton in September 1965 when the position was given to Ronnie Allen who'd joined the coaching staff in the close season.

In the 1965–66 season, it quickly became apparent that Knowles was a notch above just about everyone else playing in the Second Division. Among a handful of goals, he scored two hat-tricks early on in the season against Carlisle United and Derby County, making him the top scorer for the club by some way. His good form was interrupted however, as he endured the first big injury of his career. Despite missing a number of games, he managed to finish the season with 19 goals. Frustratingly for Knowles, Wolves did not manage to gain promotion that season, condemning him to another season of Second Division football. He remained at Molineux, and in the 1966–67 season Wolves finished runners-up in the Second Division and achieved promotion to the First Division.

On his return to the First Division, he suffered from injury problems once again, only managing 21 appearances and eight goals. Later on in that season however, Knowles was compensated with a call up to the Under-23 England team.

In a move by FIFA to raise awareness of "soccer" in the United States, a mini-league was held in which various teams from Britain went to America to represent different states. Wolves represented Los Angeles, and Knowles featured in the side as they went on to win their league. The 21-year-old Knowles scored several goals in the tournament.

The 1967–68 season brought about a new strike partner for Knowles, in the form of Derek "The Doog" Dougan. Knowles, now an established performer, performed well in the top flight with Dougan, managing to narrowly avoid relegation. Knowles, amongst the Wolves' scorers behind Dougan with 17 and ahead of Frank Wignall who was hired from Nottingham with nine goals, managed 12 goals during the season, which led to the 22-year-old receiving three more Under-23 international caps. With the 1970 World Cup in Mexico quickly approaching, Knowles sought a move away from Wolves. His request was once again rejected by manager Allen.

In the 1968–69 season, Wolves finished 16th in the table, Knowles being second best scorer of the club behind Dougan with 11 goals. In the summer which followed, Knowles once again travelled to the United States to play in a promotional league. This time, Wolves represented Kansas City. Knowles scored five in the tournament, helping Wolves to its second state-side victory.

=== Retirement ===
Upon his return to Britain, Knowles made an announcement which saw his career take a dramatic and unexpected turn. He became a Jehovah's Witness, and in his own words, "I shall continue playing football for the time being but I have lost my ambition. Though I still do my best on the field I need more time to learn about the Bible and may give up football." Despite this, Wolves got the 1969–70 season off to a great start, winning the first four matches, Knowles scoring in the first three of them. Two home draws and an away defeat in Coventry followed. The eighth game of the season, a 3–3 draw at home against Nottingham Forest, was the last game that Knowles ever played.

Knowles was now retired from football, and the dream of winning a full England cap would never be fulfilled. But a succession of Wolves managers held out the hope that Knowles might one day return to the game, and he remained on contract at the club for the next 12 years. In 1982, however, new manager Graham Hawkins conceded that Knowles would never return, and promptly terminated the 36-year-old's contract.

In 1991 folk musician Billy Bragg released the song "God's Footballer" which many saw as a direct reference to Knowles. The song appeared on Bragg's album Don't Try This at Home.

Following his retirement from football Knowles worked as a milkman, a window cleaner and in the warehouse of Marks & Spencer. Knowles has consistently stated that he never regretted giving up football.
