= Listed buildings in Hemsworth =

Hemsworth is a civil parish in the metropolitan borough of the City of Wakefield, West Yorkshire, England. The parish contains eleven listed buildings that are recorded in the National Heritage List for England. All the listed buildings are designated at Grade II, the lowest of the three grades, which is applied to "buildings of national importance and special interest". The parish contains the town of Hemsworth, the village of Fitzwilliam, and the surrounding countryside. Most of the listed buildings are houses and associated structures, and the others consist of a church, a public house, and three mileposts.

== Buildings ==
Name and location	Photograph	Date	Notes
Town End Cottage; 53.61454°N 1.34787°W	—	Early 17th century (or earlier)	The cottage has a timber framed core, and was later encased in sandstone and extended. It has a roof of stone slate and pantiles, two storeys, two bays, and a rear outshut. The windows have been altered, and on the right return is a lean-to conservatory.
Hemsworth High Hall; 53.61475°N 1.35038°W	—	17th century	A large house that was extended in about 1770, and later incorporated in a school. It is in sandstone, with quoins, a band, a moulded eaves cornice, and hipped slate roofs. There are two storeys and cellars, a main range with a double-depth plan and a symmetrical front of five bays, and slightly recessed, taller three-bay side wings. In the centre of the main range is a porch with two pairs of Doric columns, a triglyph frieze, and a cornice with mutules. The windows are sashes with plain surrounds. The side wings have pilasters flanking the middle bay, a modillion cornice, and a balustraded parapet. In the left return of the left wing is a large round-headed stair window.
Hemsworth Lanes Farmhouse; 53.62964°N 1.33086°W	—	17th century	The farmhouse is in sandstone, partly rendered, on a moulded plinth, with moulded hood moulds, and a stone slate roof. There are two storeys and attics, and a T-shaped plan, consisting of a two-bay main range and a rear wing. The openings have been altered.
Vissitt Manor; 53.60988°N 1.37486°W	—	17th century (or earlier)	A farmhouse, later a private house, it has been altered and extended. It is in sandstone with quoins and stone slate roofs. There is a U-shaped plan, consisting of a main range with two storeys and two bays, a receding gabled wing on the left with two storeys and an attic, and a rear outshut on the right. The doorway has an architrave with shaped moulding, a dated and initialled lintel and a cornice. To the right is a Tudor arched doorway converted into a window. Most of the windows are sashes, there are some remaining mullioned windows, and at the rear is a tall narrow three-stage stair window.
28 and 30 Barnsley Road; 53.61346°N 1.35795°W	—	1773	A house, later divided, in sandstone, with quoins, an eaves band, and a hipped stone slate roof. There are three storeys, a double-depth plan, and three bays. The central doorway has a moulded architrave and a pediment on consoles, and in the pediment is a small dated panel. To the left is a bow window, and to the right is a canted bay window. The windows in the middle floor are rectangular, the middle window with a keystone, and in the top floor they are square, almost all with top-hung casements.
The Catchpenny Public House; 53.63724°N 1.38077°W		Late 18th century	A private house, later a public house, it is in sandstone with sill bands, a moulded eaves cornice, and a hipped tile roof. There are two storeys, a double depth plan, and a symmetrical front of five bays. In the centre is a round-headed doorway with a Tuscan architrave, engaged columns, moulded imposts, a semicircular fanlight with a moulded head and a keystone, and a moulded frieze. The windows are top-hung casements, and in the right return is a tall round-headed stair window.
Railings, 32 Barnsley Road; 53.61333°N 1.35830°W	—	Early to mid 19th century	The garden railings are in cast iron. They stand on a plinth of large sandstone blocks, and are divided into groups of ten by knobbed standards.
Milestone, Pontefract Road; 53.62760°N 1.33877°W	—	Early to mid 19th century	The milepost is on a roundabout on Pontefract Road to the north of Hemsworth. It is in sandstone with a cast iron overlay, and has a triangular section and a rounded top. On the top is "BARNSLEY & PONTEFRACT ROAD" and "HEMSWORTH" and on the sides are the distances to Barnsley and Pontefract (both names are abbreviated).
Milestone, Station Road; 53.61460°N 1.34726°W		Early to mid 19th century	The milepost on the east side of Station Road is in sandstone with a cast iron overlay, and has a triangular section and a rounded top. On the top is "BARNSLEY & PONTEFRACT ROAD" and "HEMSWORTH" and on the sides are the distances to Barnsley and Pontefract (both names are abbreviated).
Milestone, Barnsley Road; 53.60867°N 1.36709°W		Early to mid 19th century	The milepost is on the northwest side of Barnsley Road to the east of Hemsworth. It is in sandstone with a cast iron overlay, and has a triangular section and a rounded top. On the top is "BARNSLEY & PONTEFRACT ROAD" and "HEMSWORTH" and on the sides are the distances to Barnsley and Pontefract (both names are abbreviated).
St Helen's Church; 53.61415°N 1.35321°W		1865–67	The church was largely rebuilt by John Loughborough Pearson, retaining some medieval fabric. It is built in sandstone, the roof of the nave is tiled, and elsewhere are stone slate roofs. The church consists of a nave, north and south aisles, a south porch, a chancel with a south chapel and a north vestry, and a west tower. The tower has four stages, it contains a three-light west window, and has a plain parapet. The east window is large, with five lights, Decorated tracery, and a hood mould.
