= Cromwell Bradley =

English footballer and cricketer (1904–1968)

Cromwell Marland Bradley (18 November 1904 – 10 May 1968), sometimes known as Cecil Bradley, was an English footballer and minor counties cricketer.

Bradley was born in Hemsworth, Yorkshire. He had a brief professional football career, making four appearances in the Football League for Norwich City between 1927 and 1928. He left Norwich for Sheffield Wednesday, but never made an appearance for the Yorkshire club. He also played amateur football for Margate Town, Falmouth Town, Truro City and Wadebridge Town.

After settling in Cornwall, Bradley played minor counties cricket for Cornwall, albeit intermittently, from 1927 to 1936, making eight appearances in the Minor Counties Championship. He died in Redruth in May 1968.
