= Thomas Bradley (priest) =

17th-century English Anglican priest

Thomas Bradley was born in 1596 or 1597, the son of Henry Bradley of Wokingham in Berkshire and his wife, Barbara daughter of Walter Lane of Reading in the same county. He was educated at Exeter College, Oxford and was admitted to the degree of Doctor of Divinity. On 5 March 1631, he married Frances the youngest daughter of John Savile, 1st Baron Savile of Pontefract.

He was initially chaplain to George Villiers, 1st Duke of Buckingham, whom he accompanied on trips to the Île de Ré and to La Rochelle and in 1628 he was appointed chaplain to Charles I. He became Rector of Castleford in 1630 and from 1643 he was additionally Rector of Ackworth. His parishes were in a strongly Royalist part of Yorkshire. During the Siege of Pontefract in 1644, he was a preacher to the Royalist troops under Sir George Wentworth. In 1645 Parliamentarian troops occupied Ackworth and he was deprived of his livings. He underwent much suffering during the Interregnum when along with his family he was ejected from their home. It is generally supposed that he attended Charles I at his execution on 30 January 1649.

He was restored to the rectory of Ackworth following the end of the Commonwealth of England in 1660. (Note: Some sources say he was restored in 1663 and these appear to be incorrect. In 1663 he erected (or restored) the church font, and there may be a misunderstanding on this account. He also appears to have become Chaplain to the King in 1663, perhaps another cause of confusion.) In 1666 he founded two almshouses at Ackworth. He resigned from his livings in 1672 and died on 10 October 1673.

== Publications ==
- Comfort from the cradle, as well as from the crosse of Christ, 2 sermons (Oxford, 1650)
- A præsent for Cæsar, of 100000 l. in hand and 50000 l. a year (London, 1658)
- A sermon ad clerum (York, 1663)
- Nosce te ipsum, in a comparison between the first, and second Adam (York, 1668)
- Elijah's nunc dimittis. Or the authors own funerall sermons (York, 1669)
- Elijah's epitaph, and the motto of all mortalls (York, 1670)
