= Oakfield Park School =

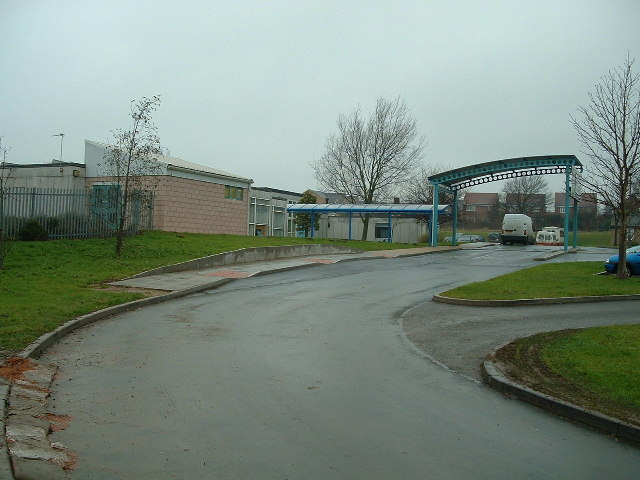

Location
- Barnsley Road; Ackworth, West Yorkshire, WF7 7DT; England
- Coordinates: 53.63692°N 1.33597°W

Information
- Type: Community special school
- Motto: All Valued, All Different, All Equal
- Established: 1990
- Local authority: City of Wakefield
- Department for Education URN: 133719 Tables
- Ofsted: Reports
- Head teacher: Stephanie Nagy
- Gender: Coeducational
- Age: 11 to 19
- Colour: Green Light Blue
- Website: http://www.oakfieldpark.wakefield.sch.uk/

Oakfield Park School (formerly OakTree School) is a coeducational special school in Ackworth, West Yorkshire, England.

In early 2000s Oakfield Tree School was renamed into Oakfield Park School

On 5 September 2017 new classrooms were opened, and to communicate with new and ongoing students (though kept a ongoing students) a Blu-ray Disc system was installed in some classrooms.

The village planned to open an Ackworth FM studio and launch the station by 2019 next to the Oakfield Park School on the left side of the tennis court. This failed due to the station going into administration, and the station license was not awarded by Ofcom. The building was demolished.

== New building ==
In late-2014 work on the New Building had begun. The new building was completed, and a new logo was introduced in summer 2015. Jumpers and T-shirts for students were redesigned accordingly.

== Mobile phones ban ==
In February 2019, The school banned the use of mobile phones in school because of the calls and the ringtones being to loud and overstimulating for other students, and as mobile phones are a distraction in the educational environment which is another lead to the ban.

== App ==
In May 2019 Oakfield Park School launched a new app called SchoolJotter which is available for Android and iOS devices.

== Productions ==
- The Good Old Days/The Days Gone By
- The Jungle Book Show featuring Survivor and more.
- Om Nom Party (cancelled event)
