= Listed buildings in Badsworth =

Badsworth is a civil parish in the metropolitan borough of the City of Wakefield, West Yorkshire, England. The parish contains ten listed buildings that are recorded in the National Heritage List for England. Of these, one is listed at Grade I, the highest of the three grades, and the others are at Grade II, the lowest grade. The parish contains the village of Badsworth and the surrounding area. All the listed buildings are in the village, and include a church, and monuments and a sundial in the churchyard. The other listed buildings consist of a farmhouse, and a former stable, a former rectory, and a former meeting room, all converted into private houses.

== Buildings ==
Key
Grade	Criteria
I	Particularly important buildings of more than special interest
II	Buildings of national importance and special interest

Name and location	Photograph	Date	Notes	Grade
St Mary's Church; 53.62926°N 1.30085°W		15th century	The church, with retains some Norman material, was restored in 1846–47, and again in about 1877 by John Douglas, and is mainly in Perpendicular style. It is built in sandstone with stone slate roofs, and consists of a nave with a clerestory, north and south aisles, a south porch, a chancel with a north vestry, and a west tower. The tower has four stages, diagonal buttresses, a west doorway with a pointed arch and a moulded arch, above which is a three-light west window, a small crocketed niche, a clock face on the south front, and an embattled parapet with crocketed corner pinnacles. The nave and aisles also have embattled parapets.	I
Kirkbank; 53.62911°N 1.30169°W	—	c.1700	A farmhouse in sandstone with a slate roof, three storeys and three bays. The recessed doorway is approached by three steps. Most of the windows are square windows, and in the top floor are two recessed two-light mullioned windows.	II
Mason monument 53.62920°N 1.30075°W	—	Early 18th century	The monument is in the churchyard of St Mary's Church, and is to the memory of members of the Mason family. It is in sandstone, and consists of a slab with a grooved margin, a semicircular band of scallops round the head, winged angel heads in the spandrels, and an inscription.	II
Shillito monument 53.62922°N 1.30072°W	—	Early 18th century	The monument is in the churchyard of St Mary's Church, and is to the memory of members of the Shillito family. It is in sandstone, and consists of a slab with a grooved surround, a scrolled semicircular band round the head, simple scrolls at the foot, and an inscription.	II
The Old Rectory; 53.62806°N 1.29875°W	—	1731 (possible)	The former rectory was extended in about 1800, and later divided. It is in sandstone with a floor band, a moulded eaves band, and a stone slate roof with coped gables and kneelers. There is a U-shaped plan, consisting of a single-depth three-storey range with four bays, a service wing with two storeys and four bays to the rear of the west end, and a later receding two-bay wing at the east end with a basement. The doorway has a moulded architrave, to the right is a bay window, and most of the other windows are sashes. At the rear is a gabled turret and a full-height lean-to.	II
Stables, Badsworth Hall; 53.62999°N 1.30199°W		18th century	The stables to Badsworth Hall, which has been demolished, were converted for residential use in 1941. The building is in sandstone, with rusticated quoins, and a hipped slate roof. There are two storeys, a rectangular plan, and a symmetrical front. In the centre is a round-headed arch with a keystone and splayed imposts. There is a similar opening at the rear, and the windows are a mix of small square windows and sashes.	II
Harrison monument 53.62908°N 1.30113°W	—	Mid 18th century	The monument is in the churchyard of St Mary's Church, and is to the memory of two members of the Harrison family. It is in sandstone, and consists of a slab that is decorated with an incised semicircular arch springing from imposts on scrolled brackets, with a triple keystone and an inscription.	II
Jackson monument 53.62900°N 1.30112°W	—	Mid 18th century	The monument is in the churchyard of St Mary's Church, and is to the memory of two members of the Jackson family. It is in sandstone, and consists of a headstone with a scalloped top and an inscription in a panel.	II
Sundial; 53.62911°N 1.30077°W	—	1822	The sundial is in the churchyard of St Mary's Church. It has a low sandstone base about 1 metre (3 ft 3 in) square, rounded on the south side, on which is a vase pedestal in magnesian limestone with a moulded foot and cap. On the cap is an inscribed and dated brass plate and a scrolled gnomon.	II
School House; 53.62934°N 1.30004°W	—	1826	A meeting room that was extended, and later a private house, it is in sandstone with a slate roof. There are two storeys and an L-shaped plan, consisting of a single-depth range, and a later gable wing on the right. The doorway has a plain surround, and the windows are sashes, including a round-headed window in the upper floor of the gabled wing. On the front is an inscribed and dated roundel.	II
