= Lound, Nottinghamshire =

Coordinates: 53.37°N 0.96°W

Lound
- Civil parish
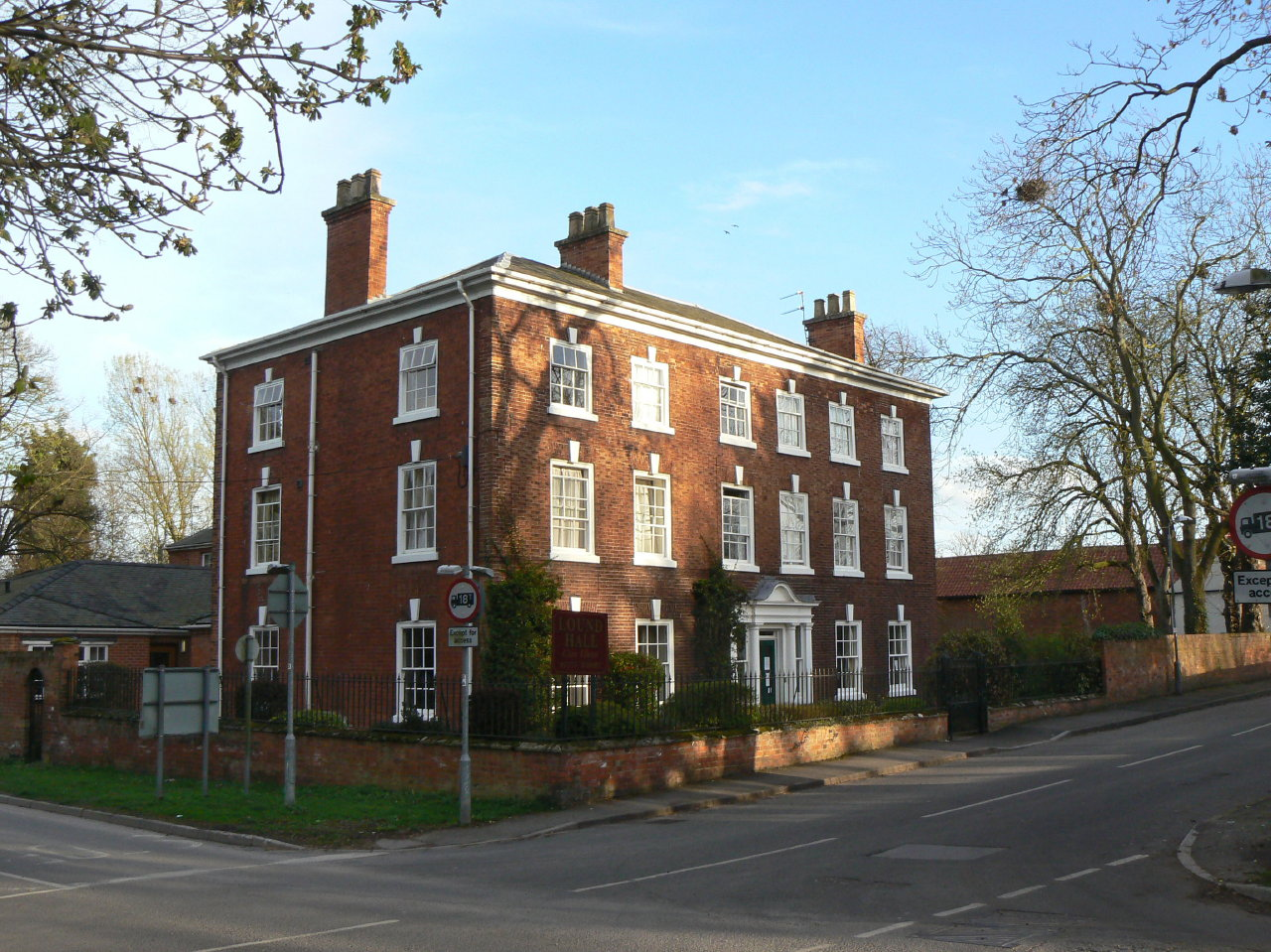
- Lound Hall

- Location within Nottinghamshire
- Interactive map of Lound
- Area: 3.33 sq mi (8.6 km^{2})
- Population: 454 (2021)
  - Density: 136/sq mi (53/km^{2})
- OS grid reference: SK 692859
  - London: 130 mi (210 km) SE
- District: Bassetlaw
- Shire county: Nottinghamshire
- Region: East Midlands
- Country: England
- Sovereign state: United Kingdom
- Post town: RETFORD
- Postcode district: DN22
- Dialling code: 01777
- Police: Nottinghamshire
- Fire: Nottinghamshire
- Ambulance: East Midlands
- UK Parliament: Bassetlaw
- Website: www.loundvillage.co.uk

Lound is a village in Nottinghamshire, England, four miles north of Retford. It had a population of 493 in the census of 2001, reducing to 471 at the 2011 census, and 454 in 2021. The village is of Danish origin dating from the 8th century with a street (Town Street) running along the spine of the village, leading on to Lound Low Road. The oldest houses are tofts which are endways on to the street with strips of land running back from the road. Nearby villages are Sutton cum Lound and Mattersey.

Lound is situated on a rise of land next to the flood plain of the river Idle. This has created large deposits of sand and gravel on the east side of the village.

Activities at Lound are water skiing, fishing, horse riding, walking, bird watching. Some of these are situated in and around the open waters created by sand and gravel workings. Wetlands Wildfowl Reserve is situated on the outskirts of the village and there are also reserves belonging to Nottinghamshire Wildlife Trust and Daneshill Lakes recreation area nearby. The Lound Bird Club records bird life using the gravel quarries and surrounding woodland and farmland in this section of the River Idle Valley. Nottinghamshire Wildlife Trust has extended its ownership at its Idle Valley Nature Reserve and runs a programme of community focussed events from the Idle Valley Rural Learning Centre operated by North Nottinghamshire College.

== See also ==
- Listed buildings in Lound, Nottinghamshire
