= Hemsworth =

Town and civil parish in West Yorkshire, England

Coordinates: 53.610°N 1.350°W

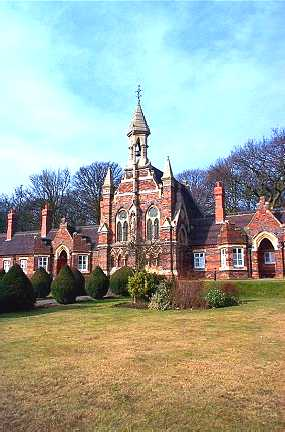
- Archbishop Holgate Almshouse

- Location within West Yorkshire
- Interactive map showing the parish boundary
- Population: 14,165 (2021 census)
- OS grid reference: SE430128
- Civil parish: Hemsworth
- Metropolitan borough: City of Wakefield
- Metropolitan county: West Yorkshire
- Region: Yorkshire and the Humber
- Country: England
- Sovereign state: United Kingdom
- Post town: Pontefract
- Postcode district: WF9
- Dialling code: 01977
- Police: West Yorkshire
- Fire: West Yorkshire
- Ambulance: Yorkshire
- UK Parliament: Normanton and Hemsworth

Hemsworth is a town and civil parish in West Yorkshire, England. Historically within the West Riding of Yorkshire, the town lies 7 1/2 miles (12 km) from Barnsley, 7 miles (11 km) from Pontefract and 9 miles (14 km) from Wakefield.

The civil parish includes the neighbouring villages of Fitzwilliam and Kinsley, and had a total population of 14,165 at the 2021 census, while Hemsworth town alone had a population of 9,180.

== History ==
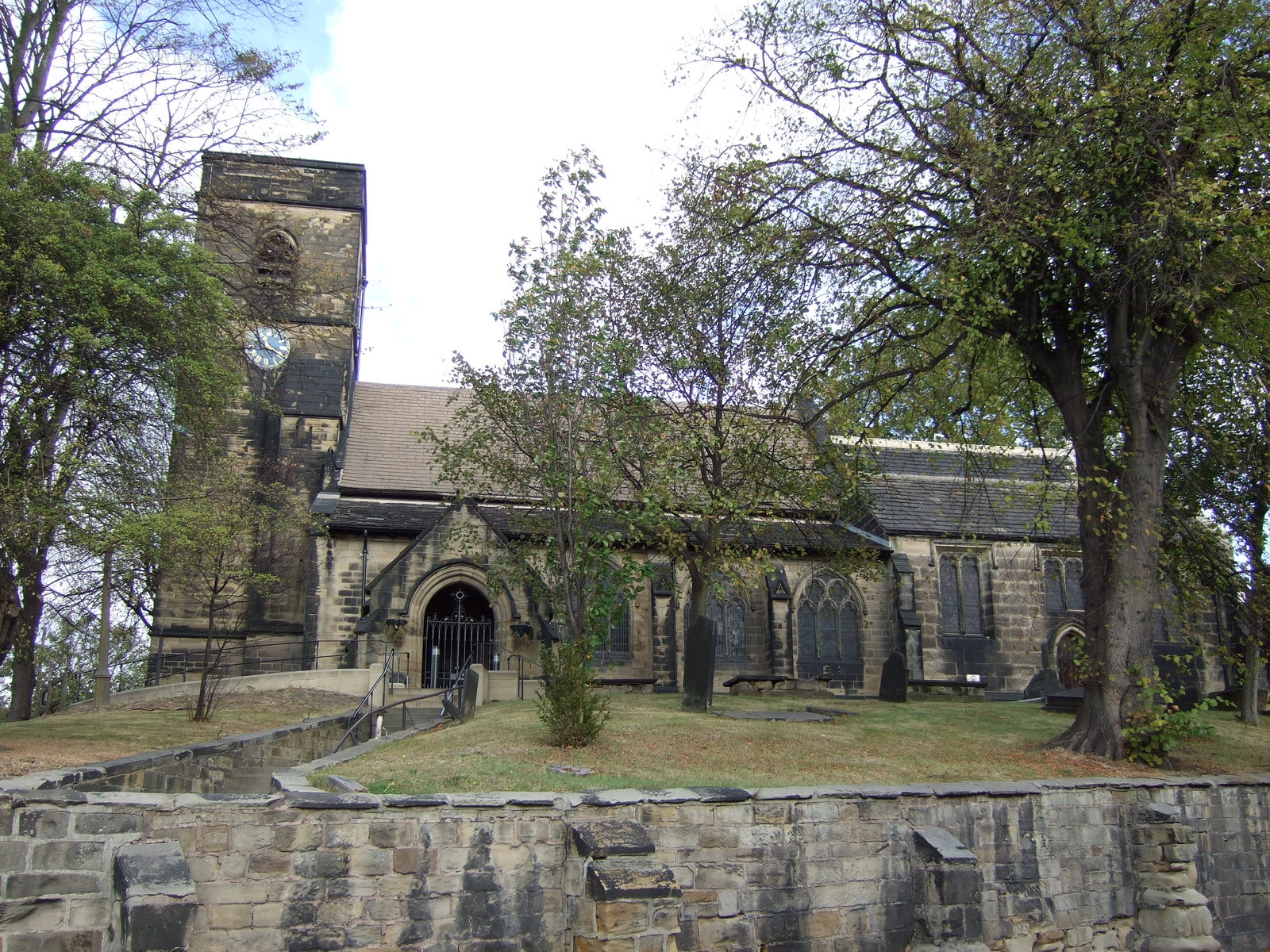
St Helen's Church, Hemsworth's parish church

While Hemsworth's recent history and reputation are dominated by the coal mining industry that developed in the latter part of the nineteenth century, it had long existed as an agricultural village.

Hemsworth, meaning "Hymel's enclosure", is mentioned in Domesday Book of 1086 as Hemeleswrde, and in the twelfth century as Hymelswrde. Into the Middle Ages it was a township in the Wapentake of Staincross and is also thought to have been in the honour, or feudal barony, of Pontefract.

From the Middle Ages to Tudor times it would have seen little change to the manorial features, open fields, woods, commons, enclosed holdings, manor house, scattered farmsteads and the church, dedicated to St Helen, which dates to the eleventh or twelfth century. The present chancel was rebuilt in the fourteenth century.

A grammar school and a hospital, or almshouses, founded in the mid-sixteenth century, owe their existence to Robert Holgate, thought to have been born in Hemsworth, who was consecrated Archbishop of York in 1544.

The school, established in October 1546 by letters patent granted by Henry VIII, did not thrive. At times there were complaints about the masters failing in their duties, which were to teach Latin, Greek and Hebrew to the sons of husbandmen in Hemsworth, Felkirk, South Kirkby, Ackworth, Royston and Wragby. There were periods in the eighteenth century when there were no pupils. A revival was attempted and a new school built and opened in January 1868. But it too failed to attract numbers and was moved to more populous Barnsley in 1888. The school buildings became the Roman Catholic Church, before they themselves were replaced in the 1990s.

The Archbishop Holgate almshouses, or hospital, still exist and still offer housing accommodation in a complex of 24 cottages for selected elderly people. Originally the endowment was for a master and ten poor men and ten poor women from the locality. The brothers and sisters wore gowns, were not permitted to frequent the ale-house, nor allowed out without permission later than half past nine in the summer or half past seven in the winter. A fine of twopence was levied for breaches. Being a common swearer, drunkard or brawler could lead to removal. The endowment, based on revenue from lands which Archbishop Holgate held, appeared in Holgate's will dated April 1555 and was carried into effect a year after he died in 1556. The total net assets of the modern-day charity which continues the work are £20.7 million.

Enclosure was brought about by an act of parliament in 1803, though it was not a revolutionary change. It ended the tithe system in kind and allocated common land to local landowners, particularly to Sir Francis Wood, and, less so, to Earl Fitzwilliam.

== Governance and politics ==
Hemsworth Town Council was formed under the provisions of the Local Government Act 1972 and came into existence on 1 April 1974, succeeding the former Hemsworth Urban District Council. Five wards of Hemsworth Town Council serve the town and the villages of Fitzwilliam and Kinsley. Three councillors serve on each ward—Hemsworth East, Hemsworth South, Hemsworth West, Fitzwilliam and Kinsley.

For local government, Hemsworth is in City of Wakefield metropolitan district. Three councillors represent Hemsworth, Ward 7, on Wakefield Metropolitan District Council. Historically, Hemsworth was part of the Wapentake of Staincross in the West Riding of Yorkshire. In 1894, Hemsworth Rural District was created, but in 1921 the town was separated from the rural district and became an urban district. In 1974, the urban and rural districts were both abolished, and Hemsworth parish became part of Wakefield district in the newly created West Yorkshire metropolitan county.

Labour held the constituency of Hemsworth from its creation in 1918, and from 1966 to 1974 held it with the largest majority of any party in the UK. From 1950 to 1974, Labour's share of the vote never dropped below 80 per cent. That it became a marginal seat is regarded as partly due to the disappearance of the coal mining industry, the reorganisation of Conservative-voting areas of the southern part of Wakefield into the constituency in 2010, and the prominence of Brexit as an election issue in 2019. It is estimated that 68.1 per cent of the constituency voted leave in the EU referendum of 2016.

The constituency was reformed in the 2023 Periodic Review of Westminster constituencies, losing Wakefield South and gaining Normanton. It was renamed Normanton and Hemsworth.

The current member of Parliament, Jon Trickett (Labour), has represented Hemsworth since a by-election in 1996. He comfortably held the new seat of Normanton and Hemsworth in the general election of July 2024, taking 47.5 per cent of the vote.

== Demographics ==
At the 2021 census, the civil parish had a population of 14,165 people in 6,165 households.

Census population of Hemsworth parish
Census	Population	Female	Male	Households	Source
2001	13,311	6,769	6,542	5,544	
2011	13,533	6,903	6,630	5,794	
2021	14,165	7,233	6,932	6,165	

The Office for National Statistics (ONS) has also defined contiguous built-up areas for Hemsworth, with varying boundaries over time. The built-up area defined following the 2021 census excludes Fitzwilliam, Kinsley, and outlying rural parts of the parish, and had a population of 9,180. Population estimates for the Hemsworth built-up-areas for 2019 and 2001, broken down by age group, are:

Age group	0-15	16-24	25-64	65+	Total
Population in 2019	1,692	868	4,855	2,010	9,425
Percentage of total population	18%	9%	52%	21%	100%

Age group	0-15	16-24	25-64	65+	Total
Population in 2001	1,884	980	4,809	1,403	9,076
Percentage of total population	21%	11%	53%	15%	100%

In May 2005, the ONS estimated that unemployment in Hemsworth was just 2.8%. This marks progress from periods in the previous two decades when it could reach as high as 50%.

== Economy ==
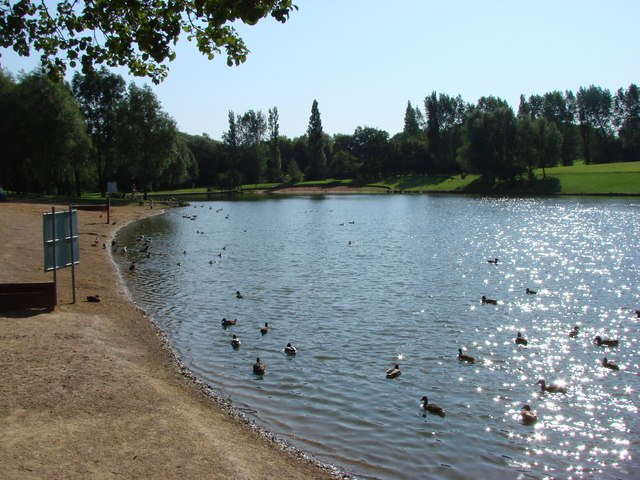
The boating lake at Hemsworth Water Park

Hemsworth was a one-industry town, where coal mining employed the vast majority of residents, and the closure of the pits during the 1980s led to huge levels of unemployment and deprivation in the area. Hemsworth, along with nearby villages such as Ackworth, Fitzwilliam, Havercroft and Ryhill as well as the towns of South Elmsall and South Kirkby have seen much regeneration both locally and area wise.

Hemsworth is also home to Hemsworth Water Park, situated on the outskirts of the town. Hemsworth Water Park has two lakes and many recreational activities.

== Transport ==
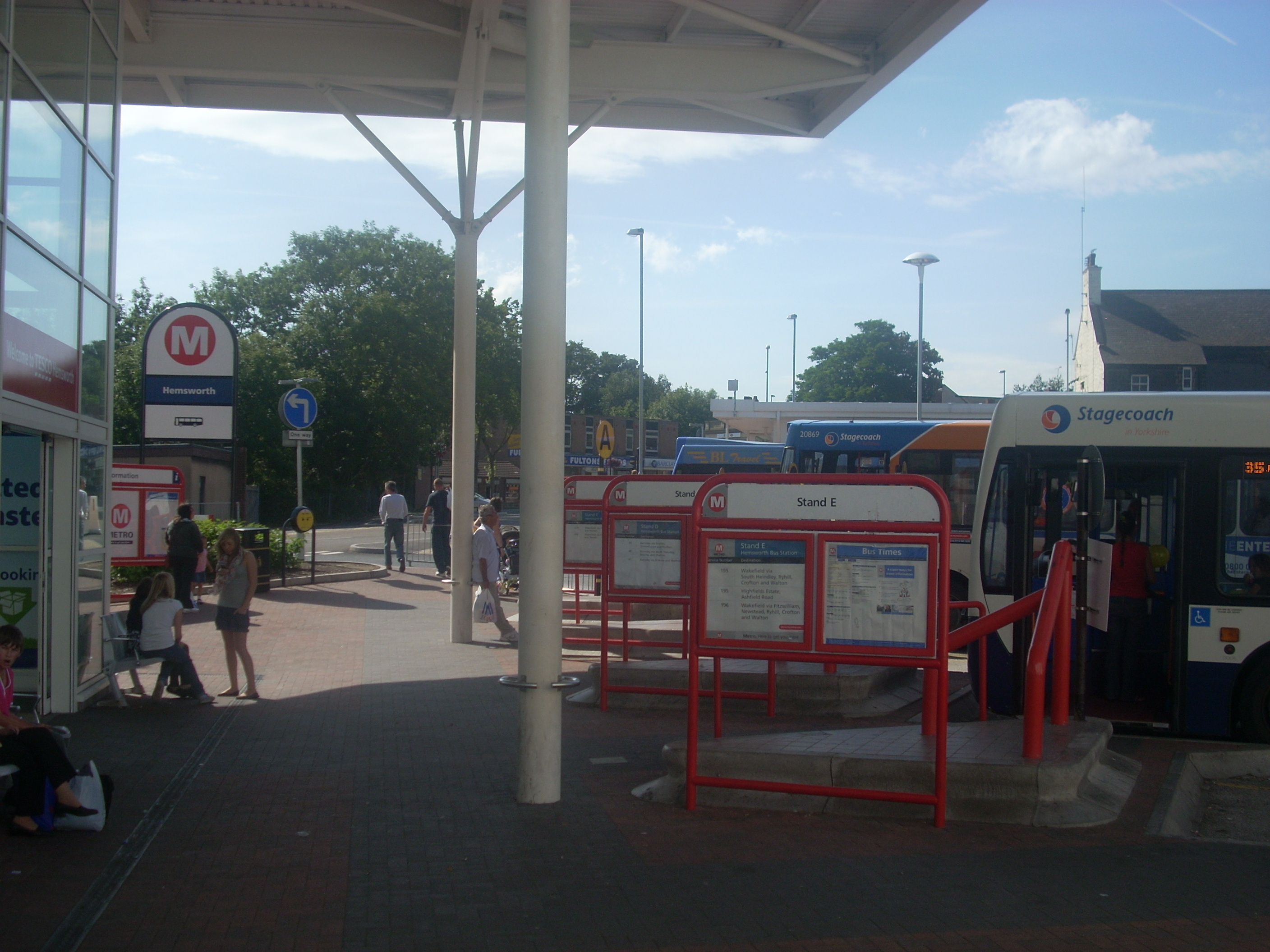
Hemsworth bus station in August 2009

Hemsworth lies at the crossing point of the Barnsley to Pontefract and the Wakefield to Doncaster roads. The junction where these roads cross, Cross Hill, is the heart of the original village, where the parish church and the George & Dragon inn still face each other. The A628 road, which forms the Barnsley to Pontefract road, bypasses Hemsworth to its south and east.

Stagecoach provides bus service 28 from Barnsley to Pontefract, which serves Hemsworth's bus station. Service 195, run by Arriva Yorkshire, links Hemsworth and Wakefield via Ryhill. The Upton to Wakefield services 496 and 497 call at Hemsworth bus station, as does service 36 run by Waterson bus and coach between South Elmsall and Barnsley.

The nearest railway station is Fitzwilliam. The station at Hemsworth closed in 1967, while Hemsworth and South Kirkby railway station on the Hull and Barnsley Railway closed in the 1930s.

== Education ==
Primary schools in Hemsworth are St Helen's CE Primary School, West End Academy, Grove Lea Primary School and Sacred Heart Catholic Primary. The only secondary school is the Outwood Academy Hemsworth, which was set up in 1921 as Hemsworth Grammar School, the first secondary school in Hemsworth after Archbishop Holgate school relocated to Barnsley in 1888.

Hemsworth had an further education college for many years: Hemsworth Mining and Technical college offered day release to mining apprentices as well as a range of other academic and vocational courses. It closed in the 1990s.

== Media ==
The local weekly newspaper, the Hemsworth and South Elmsall Express, is published by National World, the parent company of Yorkshire Post Newspapers and which also publishes The Scotsman and scores of local papers and websites.

The Barnsley Chronicle's local news coverage also extends to Hemsworth.

Local news and television programmes are provided by BBC Yorkshire and ITV Yorkshire. Television signals are received from the Emley Moor transmitter.

Local radio stations are BBC Radio Leeds, Heart Yorkshire, Capital Yorkshire, Hits Radio West Yorkshire, Greatest Hits Radio Yorkshire and community radio station Rhubarb Radio launched in 2017, operated by volunteers. Based in Ossett, it broadcasts to the Wakefield district and south Leeds.

== Notable people ==
- Robert Holgate, Bishop of Llandaff from 1537 and Archbishop of York from 1545 to 1554, is thought to have been a native of Hemsworth.
- Professional gambler and racehorse owner Phil Bull was born in Hemsworth in 1910.
- Cricketer Geoffrey Boycott was born in nearby Fitzwilliam in 1940 and attended Hemsworth Grammar School.
- Footballer for Manchester City, Newcastle United and Sunderland Jeff Clarke was born in Hemsworth.
- Former UFC fighter Scott Askham was born and still lives in Hemsworth
- Cromwell Bradley, footballer and minor counties cricketer.
- Footballer for Arsenal, West Ham United & Blackburn Rovers John Radford was born in Hemsworth.
- Roy Ellam Footballer, Leeds United, Huddersfield Town, Bradford City.

== See also ==
- Listed buildings in Hemsworth
