= Lagentium =

Roman name for the fort and surrounding civilian settlement

- Legiolum
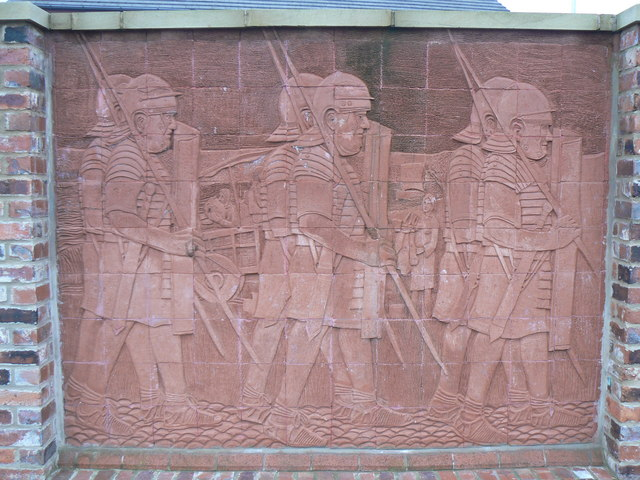
- Modern tile mosaic illustrating Castleford's Roman history

- Location within West Yorkshire
- 53.726°N 1.356°W
- Location: Castleford, West Yorkshire, England, England

History
- Founded: c. 74 AD
- Abandoned: 180 AD

Lagentium or Legiolum was the Roman name for the fort and surrounding civilian settlement which was built around the year 74 by the Roman Empire. The English town of Castleford, West Yorkshire, is now built on what was the fort.

== Etymology ==
The name Lagentium may be of Brittonic origin. The name may involve the element lagīnā-, with connotations of "spear" and "blade", with the suffix -tjo- affixed. Andrew Breeze revived the proffering that Lagentium was based on an ethnic name.

== History ==
Until around 71-74 AD, the Brigantes occupied most of what is now Yorkshire and the North East, along with parts of Lancashire. When the Romans defeated the Brigantes at this time, they built a turf and timber fort to guard the river crossings and the vital road to the north, naming this new settlement Lagentium. The fort was built on either a natural ridge or a man-made mound, we are not certain. The Roman engineers chose Lagentium for its strongly strategic position. The mound offered a strong and clear vantage point, and the river offered a source of water and food. The low crossing point also had the advantage that both sides of the river could be farmed on. So a fort was built on top of a Brigantian settlement. Over the sixty years after the fort was built, permanent shops and gardens were built, and traders began to arrive.

The fort was garrisoned for 24 years by the Roman army, to keep the Brigantes under control. The Romans simply believed that the Brigantes were 'barbarians', but peace was eventually established and the troops were moved to the north. The Brigantes were not the most advanced of British Tribes, but the few Brigantes that did accept Roman law were allowed to experience greatly enhanced living conditions, under the watchful eye of the Romans.

Around 43, a road known as Ermine Street ran from the south to the north, but the Romans had to cross the Humber estuary to get to the other side of the road. The estuary was two miles wide, and the river had raging currents, and was subject to strong winds, making any crossing very difficult. Also, the Romans were not keen sailors, so this route north was not appropriate. So the Romans built another road, locally known as Roman Ridge and often considered a branch of Dere Street or Watling Street, with numerous forts strategically positioned along it. Lagentium, along with what is now Littleborough, Bawtry, Tadcaster and Doncaster, was one of these forts.

The fort built in Castleford shared many of the luxuries of any Roman settlement. In the vicus (a settlement just outside the fort) there were temples, houses, shops, alehouses (public house), public bathhouses and brothels. Many other improvements were made to Lagentium, including straight metalled roads, rectangular stone buildings with tiled roofs and glazed windows; the houses had drains and sometimes central heating.

Around 180 Lagentium was abandoned, as the Roman Empire withdrew its legions. The Brigantes returned to power and reoccupied Lagentium around 250, Their culture, now called Romano-British, had been profoundly influenced by that of the Romans. There were no significant changes from the time the Romans had left to the Middle Ages. The Brigantes allowed the fort to grow over, and they continued with the farming way of life that they had had for centuries.

After the Norman Conquest of England in 1066: the land was split up and given to the King's knights. The land in Castleford, Pontefract, Leeds, Wakefield and Morley was given to Ilbert de Lacey. Castleford continued to be a farming village, and remained as one until the Industrial Revolution.
