= Badsworth =

Coordinates: 53.62°N 01.30°W

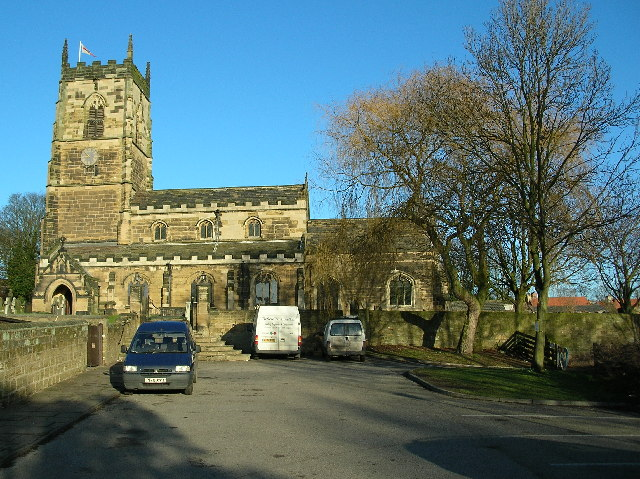
- Saint Mary the Virgin Church

- Location within West Yorkshire
- Population: 682 (2011)
- OS grid reference: SE4614
- Civil parish: Badsworth
- Metropolitan borough: City of Wakefield
- Metropolitan county: West Yorkshire
- Region: Yorkshire and the Humber
- Country: England
- Sovereign state: United Kingdom
- Post town: PONTEFRACT
- Postcode district: WF9
- Police: West Yorkshire
- Fire: West Yorkshire
- Ambulance: Yorkshire

Badsworth is a village and civil parish in the south-east of the City of Wakefield metropolitan borough in West Yorkshire, England. According to the 2001 census it had a population of 583, increasing to 682 at the 2011 Census. The village is located 6 miles (9.7 km) south of Pontefract.

The name "Badsworth" has its roots in Old English and means "Enclosure of a man called Bæddi". The first element is the person's name Bæddi; the second is the word worth, meaning an enclosure, or enclosed farmstead or settlement. The village was recorded as Badesuuorde in the Domesday Book of 1086.

== See also ==
- Listed buildings in Badsworth
