= Cyril Knowles =

England international footballer (1944–1991)

Personal information
- Full name: Cyril Barry Knowles
- Date of birth: 13 July 1944
- Place of birth: Fitzwilliam, West Riding of Yorkshire, England
- Date of death: 30 August 1991 (aged 47)
- Place of death: Middlesbrough, England
- Position: Left-back

Youth career
- Hemsworth F.C.
- Monckton Colliery Welfare

Senior career*
Years	Team	Apps	(Gls)
1963–1964	Middlesbrough	39	(1)
1964–1976	Tottenham Hotspur	402	(15)
Total		441	(16)

International career
1967–1968	England	4	(0)

Managerial career
- 1983–1987: Darlington
- 1987–1989: Torquay United
- 1989–1991: Hartlepool United
Father	Cyril Knowles
Relatives	Peter Knowles (brother)
- * Club domestic league appearances and goals

Cyril Barry Knowles (13 July 1944 – 30 August 1991) was a footballer who played left-back for Tottenham Hotspur and England. He was the son of the rugby league footballer Cyril Knowles, and the older brother of fellow professional footballer Peter Knowles.

== Playing career ==
=== Early career ===
Knowles was born in Fitzwilliam, West Yorkshire, and started his career as a left winger with local side Hemsworth before rejection from three of the country's leading sides – Manchester United, Blackpool and Wolverhampton Wanderers – left him questioning his future prospects as a professional footballer.

=== Middlesbrough ===
However, Middlesbrough recognised his talents as a potential left-back and Knowles was accepted into their amateur squad. He made his debut late in the 1962–63 season and after just 39 first team appearances legendary Spurs manager Bill Nicholson signed Knowles in 1964 for £45,000.

=== Tottenham Hotspur ===
Knowles was seen as a young replacement for Ron Henry, a member of the Spurs team that famously won the Double in 1960–61, the FA Cup in 1962 and the European Cup Winners Cup in 1963. His first competitive match for Spurs was in a 2–0 win over Sheffield United at White Hart Lane on the opening day of 1964–65 First Division campaign.

Knowles would spend 11 years at White Hart Lane, where he was famed for his crossing ability, creating countless opportunities from open play as well as set pieces. He is also remembered for his excellent partnership with Irish right-back Joe Kinnear and his valuable contribution towards the acceptance of the overlapping, attacking full-back in modern football.

A stalwart of the Spurs first team, he missed only one league match between 1965 and 1969 and represented England four times, making his international debut against the Soviet Union in December 1967. Knowles also represented the English Under-23 team on six occasions and played for Young England against the England senior side and the Football League against the Scottish League in 1968 and 1969. Only the consistent performances of Leeds United star Terry Cooper restricted Knowles to a fringe role in the national team.

Knowles made his final appearance as a professional footballer in a 2–2 draw with Everton in December 1975. Regular knee problems forced his premature retirement at the age of 31 but his contributions and loyalty to Tottenham Hotspur were rewarded with a testimonial match against arch-rivals Arsenal in the same season. An example of his quality was the memorable display against Leeds United in one of his final appearances for the club. With Spurs needing victory to avoid relegation against the reigning First Division champions and 1975 European Cup finalists, Knowles scored twice in a 4–2 victory to keep them in the First Division.

He scored 17 goals in 507 appearances for Tottenham Hotspur, winning the FA Cup in 1967, the League Cup in 1971 and 1973 and a UEFA Cup winners medal in 1972. After announcing his retirement from professional football, Knowles started his managerial career as a Yorkshire based scout for Spurs. This was followed by a brief spell as manager of Hertford Town in 1976 and he was first team coach at Doncaster Rovers between 1977 and 1981.

He was the inspiration for the popular record "Nice One Cyril", performed by Cockerel Chorus, which peaked at number 14 in the UK Singles Charts in March 1973, and is widely regarded as the greatest left-back in the history of Tottenham Hotspur by both supporters and critics.

== Managerial career ==
In the summer of 1981, he was appointed assistant manager of Middlesbrough, where he started his career, but resigned two years later to become manager of Fourth Division strugglers Darlington. His second season, 1984–85, was a great success as he transformed the club's playing fortunes and guided them to third place in the Fourth Division, ensuring promotion to the Third Division. Knowles guided Darlington to 13th place in the Third Division for 1985–86, and remains the only manager to have preserved their third-tier status in the modern era.

He resigned as Darlington manager in 1987 following relegation to the Fourth Division, but soon returned to management with Torquay United. As manager of Torquay, Knowles developed the talent of Lee Sharpe, the young winger who would star for Manchester United in the early 1990s and later play for Leeds United and Sampdoria. He transformed a poor side that had almost been relegated from the League the previous season, taking them to the brink of play-offs in his first season and the final of the Associate Members' Cup the following year.

He resigned as manager of Torquay in October 1989 after a disappointing start to the 1989–90 season but returned to management in December, at Fourth Division basement club Hartlepool United. He revived Hartlepool and they finished 12 points clear of relegation. Their form in 1990–91 was even better, and they eventually gained promotion in third place.

He was diagnosed with a brain tumour in February 1991 and coach Alan Murray took temporary charge of the first team. At the end of the season, Murray took over on a permanent basis, with Knowles unable to continue following brain surgery.

Knowles failed to recover from the cancer and he died on 30 August 1991 at the age of 47. Three months after his death a memorial match was played at White Hart Lane and in 1995 a new stand at Hartlepool's Victoria Park stadium was renamed in his honour.

== Personal life ==
Knowles married Betty Grundy in 1967, with whom he had a son, who died in a freak traffic accident when a stone was thrown up from the road and crashed through the window of the car he was in and hit him in the head. Knowles was a Labour Party supporter.

== Honours ==
=== As a player ===
Tottenham Hotspur

- FA Cup: 1966–67
- Football League Cup: 1970–71, 1972–73
- FA Charity Shield: 1967 (shared)
- UEFA Cup: 1971–72; runner-up: 1973–74
- Anglo-Italian League Cup: 1971

=== As a manager ===
Darlington

- Football League Fourth Division third-place promotion: 1984–85

Torquay United

- Associate Members' Cup runner-up: 1988–89

Hartlepool United

- Football League Fourth Division third-place promotion: 1990–91

== Managerial statistics ==
Team	From	To	Record				
Team	From	To	G	W	L	D	Win %
Darlington	July 1983	March 1987	190	67	71	52	35.3
Torquay United	June 1987	October 1989	120	46	46	28	38.3
Hartlepool United	November 1989	June 1991	85	40	27	18	47.1
