= Fitzwilliam, West Yorkshire =

Village in West Yorkshire, England

Coordinates: 53.63249°N 1.37556°W

Fitzwilliam
- Location within West Yorkshire
- OS grid reference: SE413152
- Civil parish: Hemsworth
- Metropolitan borough: City of Wakefield
- Metropolitan county: West Yorkshire
- Region: Yorkshire and the Humber
- Country: England
- Sovereign state: United Kingdom
- Post town: PONTEFRACT
- Postcode district: WF9
- Dialling code: 01977
- Police: West Yorkshire
- Fire: West Yorkshire
- Ambulance: Yorkshire
- UK Parliament: Hemsworth

Fitzwilliam is a village on the edge of West Yorkshire, England, in the City of Wakefield district. The village is part of the town of Hemsworth and falls within the Hemsworth ward of Wakefield City Council.

== History ==
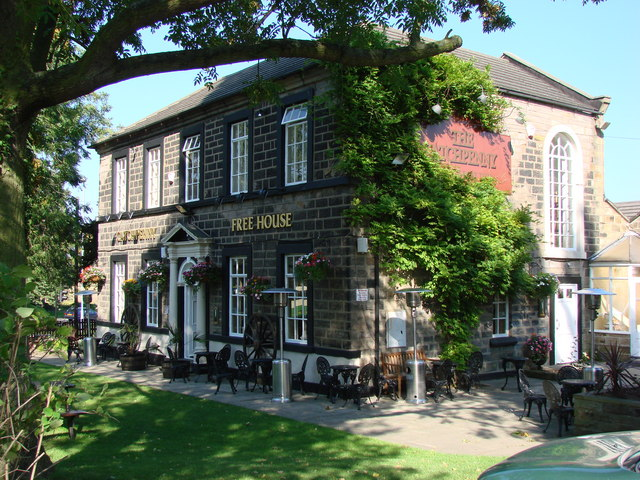
The Catchpenny pub

Fitzwilliam is part of the historic county of the West Riding of Yorkshire in the Wapentake of Staincross. The Wapentake almost corresponds with the current Barnsley Metropolitan Area, although a few settlements and townships within the Staincross Wapentake such as Fitzwilliam were put outside the Metropolitan Borough of Barnsley and have lain within the current West Yorkshire Metropolitan Area since April 1974.

Fitzwilliam was built as a pit village. It has a railway station on the Wakefield Line, providing it with connections to Leeds, Wakefield, Doncaster and Sheffield. The railway station closed in 1967 and reopened in 1982 and the line was electrified in 1989.

The village provided housing for miners at the colliery originally named Fitzwilliam Main. The name was taken from the family name of the colliery's proprietor. In 1905 a bitter industrial dispute led to all the miners being evicted from their homes, which were owned by the Fitzwilliam family; this became known as the Kinsley eviction.

The mine later changed its name to Hemsworth Colliery and closed in 1969. Kinsley Drift Mine was opened on the site of the old Hemsworth Colliery in 1977. In the long-running miners' strike of 1984 to 1985, a riot took place in Fitzwilliam on 9 July 1984, and nine people ("The Fitzwilliam Nine") were convicted of public order offences as a result.

Kinsley and nearby Nostell Pit were closed in 1986 and 1987 respectively. South Kirkby Colliery closed in 1988. As a result there was a high level of unemployment in the area and emigration led to it being labelled as a ghost town. Between 2003 and 2006 part of the village was demolished, including the whole of the "City estate", to clear derelict properties. In response Fitzwilliam was included in the Hemsworth Coalfield regeneration area and has received special funding to aid its recovery. The economy improved much in the first decade of the 21st century and unemployment in the Hemsworth seat fell to 3% in 2007, although there are no statistics specifically for Fitzwilliam.

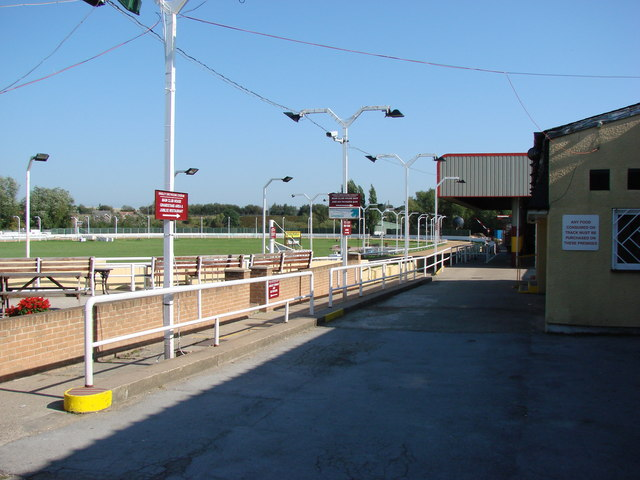
Kinsley Greyhound Stadium

== Notable residents ==
- Geoffrey Boycott, cricketer
- Cyril and Peter Knowles, footballers
- Sir Albert Lamb, commonly known as Larry Lamb, newspaper editor

== Cultural connections ==
The band Chumbawamba recorded a song named after the village, which described its painful decline following the 1984–1985 miners' strike. The village also plays a large role in the crime novel Nineteen Seventy Four, in which it is introduced in a list of "hard towns for hard men" and then later referred to as "a dirty brown mining town" and "where the night comes early and nowt [nothing] feels right, where the kids kill cats and the men kill kids".

== See also ==
- Listed buildings in Hemsworth
