= Brackenhill Light Railway =

Former railway line in Yorkshire, England

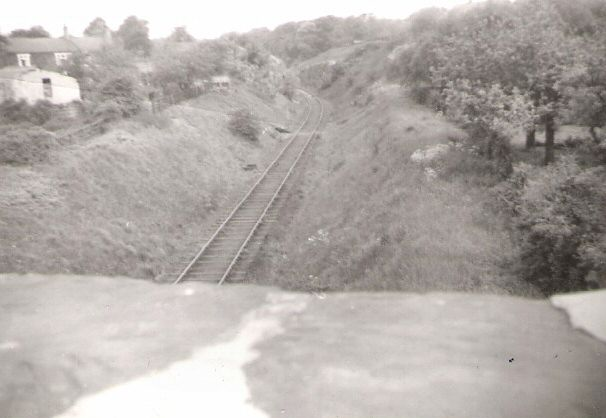
- Brackenhill Light Railway at Barnsley Bridge on the A628 (looking west)

Overview
- Status: Closed
- Stations: 1 (Ackworth Moor Top)

Service
- Type: Light railway
- Operator(s): North Eastern Railway London and North Eastern Railway British Railways

History
- Opened: 1 July 1914
- Closed: 1 January 1962

Technical
- Line length: 2.5 miles (4 km)
- Number of tracks: 1
- Track gauge: 1,435 mm (4 ft 8 1/2 in) standard gauge

The Brackenhill Light Railway was a short railway line in the West Riding of Yorkshire, England. (Note: The area is now West Yorkshire.) Whilst the line was promoted independently, it was worked by the North Eastern Railway from 1914 to 1923, thereafter being worked by the LNER, then British Railways until closure in 1962.

== History ==
The light railway left the Swinton & Knottingley route south of the River Went bridge, about 8 miles (13 km) south of Burton Salmon Junction at what was known as Brackenhill Junction. The line was used for freight traffic only, connecting with a goods station known as Ackworth Moor Top, which was on an east-facing 0.25-mile (0.40 km) spur and so required a reversal, and a coal mine at Hemsworth. It also forwarded grinding and scythe-sharpening stones from the quarries around Ackworth Moor Top.

The branch ran for 2.5 miles (4 km) from Brackenhill Junction to Hemsworth Colliery. The line terminated at Hemsworth colliery, but the colliery had been rail connected to the West Riding and Grimsby line in the Fitzwilliam area before the building of the Brackenhill Light Railway. Ackworth Moor Top station was at the 2-mile (3.2 km) point west of Brackenhill Junction. It had a fan of three sidings, a crane capable of handling 10-tonne (11-ton) loads, a weighbridge and a loop.

The line was promoted by the Yorkshire District Light Railway Syndicate Limited, gaining approval under the Light Railways Act 1896 from the Board of Trade with an order dated 19 March 1901, but was not opened until July 1914. Delays in purchasing land for the line required an extension, which was submitted in November 1903, and granted in 1904. Another extension was sought in 1907 and this too, was granted.

The line was built to a standard-gauge, and was nominally independent as it declined a working agreement with other railway companies. The NER were interested in the line from the outset, but wished to avoid a Board of Trade approval for working the line, so it remained an independent railway. However, in reality, services along the line were worked by the NER between 1914 and 1923, then at the Grouping by the LNER. Although it was designated as a light railway, it was able to handle some of the heavier locomotives, especially on coal traffic between Hemsworth Colliery and Gascoigne Wood. Locomotives and stock were provided by the NER (later LNER), and steam engines were sourced from Selby Shed, but when this closed in 1959, the remaining three years of the light railway's life saw locomotives work the line based at York shed.

The line was last used in December 1961, and formal closure came on 1 January 1962.
