= Listed buildings in Wadworth =

Wadworth is a civil parish in the metropolitan borough of Doncaster, South Yorkshire, England. The parish contains 14 listed buildings that are recorded in the National Heritage List for England. Of these, two are listed at Grade I, the highest of the three grades, two are at Grade II*, the middle grade, and the others are at Grade II, the lowest grade. The parish contains the village of Wadworth and the surrounding countryside. The most important buildings in the parish are St John's Church and Wadworth Hall, both listed at Grade I. The other listed buildings are structures associated with Wadworth Hall, farmhouses and farm buildings, and the entrance gateway to a school.

== Key ==
Grade	Criteria
I	Buildings of exceptional interest, sometimes considered to be internationally important
II*	Particularly important buildings of more than special interest
II	Buildings of national importance and special interest

== Buildings ==
Name and location	Photograph	Date	Notes	Grade
St John's Church; 53.46733°N 1.14469°W		12th century	The church, which was extended and altered through the centuries, is built in magnesian limestone and has slate roofs. It consists of a nave with a clerestory, north and south aisles, north and south porches, a chancel with a separately roofed south chapel and a north organ chamber, and a west tower embraced by the aisles. The tower is in Perpendicular style, with diagonal buttresses, a three-light west window with a pointed head, clock faces on the north and south fronts, string courses, a traceried frieze, gargoyles, and an embattled parapet with eight crocketed pinnacles. The nave and the south porch have embattled parapets, and on the chancel are gargoyles and pinnacles.	I
Long Farmhouse; 53.46653°N 1.13749°W	—	Mid to late 17th century	The farmhouse is in magnesian limestone with a Welsh slate roof. There are two storeys and six bays, and on the front is a gabled porch and a doorway. The windows in the ground floor are casements, in the upper floor there are horizontally-sliding sash windows and one casement window, and elsewhere are mullioned windows with some mullions removed, and a cross window.	II
Wadworth Hall and walls 53.46904°N 1.14728°W	—	c. 1750	A large house designed by James Paine, later used for other purposes. It is in magnesian limestone, on a plinth, with a sill band, a modillion cornice, and a hipped Westmorland slate roof. There are two storeys and attics, a double-pile plan with symmetrical fronts, the entrance front with three bays and four on the sides, and a two-storey three-bay service wing recessed on the right. The central doorway has an architrave, a double keystone, and a pediment, and it is flanked by sash windows with architraves and cornices. Above it is a semi-domed niche with an architrave, a moulded impost, an archivolt, and a scrolled keystone, and is flanked by similar windows. The outer bays contain sash windows, in the ground floor with segmental pediments on consoles, and in the upper floor with cornices. In the attics are dormers with segmental pediments. Attached to the house are curving wing walls with copings and ball finials.	I
East Lodge and wall, Wadworth Hall; 53.46845°N 1.14696°W	—	c. 1750	The entrance lodge was designed by James Paine. It is in magnesian limestone, on a plinth, with an eaves cornice, and a hipped Westmorland slate roof. There are two storeys and a front of three bays. In each bay is a recessed round-headed arch linked by an impost band. The middle bay contains a doorway with a moulded and rusticated surround, a fanlight, a double keystone, and a pediment. This is flanked by sash windows with double keystones, and in the upper floor are sash windows with voussoirs. In the right return is a round-arched recess containing a Venetian window with blind side lights. Attached to the lodge is a coped wall lining the east side of the forecourt, and containing a doorway with a cornice.	II*
West Lodge and wall, Wadworth Hall; 53.46843°N 1.14747°W	—	c. 1750	The entrance lodge was designed by James Paine. It is in magnesian limestone, on a plinth, with an eaves cornice, and a hipped Westmorland slate roof. There are two storeys and a front of three bays. In each bay is a recessed round-headed arch linked by an impost band. The middle bay contains a doorway with a moulded and rusticated surround, a fanlight, a double keystone, and a pediment. This is flanked by sash windows with double keystones, and in the upper floor are sash windows with voussoirs. In the left return is a round-arched recess containing a Venetian window with blind side lights. Attached to the lodge is a coped wall containing a doorway with a cornice.	II*
Entrance gateway, Wilsic Hall School; 53.45937°N 1.15143°W		c. 1750 (probable)	The piers and wall at the entrance to the drive are in magnesian limestone. The piers have a square section, and each main pier has a moulded plinth, a cornice, and a truncated obelisk finial with a moulded base. The wing walls have plain coping, and run in an S-shape. One end pier remains, and it has a domed cap.	II
New Farm House; 53.46670°N 1.14046°W	—	Mid 18th century	The farmhouse is in magnesian limestone with a Welsh slate roof. There are two storeys, four bays, and a rear wing. On the front is a doorway, above it is a single-light window, and the other windows are two-light casements.	II
Sundial pedestal, Wadworth Hall; 53.46876°N 1.14720°W	—	Mid 18th century (probable)	The sundial pedestal is in the centre of the formal garden at the front of the hall, and is in magnesian limestone. It consists of a circular plinth with nosing, surmounted by a vase-shaped baluster with a turned foot, gadrooning and a plain neck. On the top is a round platform without a sundial.	II
Gate piers and walls, Wadworth Hall; 53.46835°N 1.14715°W		Mid 18th century (probable)	The gate piers and wall are in magnesian limestone. The piers have a square section, and each has a moulded plinth, a plain shaft, a cornice, and a moulded cap. The walls have domed copings, and on the right side is an end pier with a pyramidal top.	II
Two barns west of Long Farmhouse; 53.46659°N 1.13798°W	—	Mid to late 18th century	The barns, later converted into stables with haylofts, are in stone with red brick dressings and pantile roofs. The two buildings are at right angles, forming an L-shaped plan. They contain various openings with segmental brick heads, including doors and windows, and external steps lead up to loft doorways.	II
Wagon sheds southwest of Long Farmhouse; 53.46620°N 1.13783°W	—	Late 18th century	The wagon sheds were converted from a barn. The former barn has a wagon entry with a wooden lintel and a relieving arch, to the left is a shed with two openings, and to the right a shed with four openings. The shed openings have square wooden posts on chamfered stone bases.	II
Pigsty south of Long Farmhouse; 53.46630°N 1.13739°W	—	Early 19th century	The pigsty is in stone with quoins and a pantile roof. There is a single storey, and it contains three pigsties with feeding hatches and gates.	II
White Cross Grange Farmhouse; 53.47918°N 1.15156°W	—	c. 1860	The farmhouse is in magnesian limestone, on a chamfered plinth, and has a Welsh slate roof with moulded gable copings and shaped kneelers. There are two storeys, a cellar and attic, a front of three bays, the outer bays gabled with ball finials, and a rear wing. On the front is a gabled porch, the windows are casements, and in the outer bays are dormers.	II
Farm buildings and wall, White Cross Grange; 53.47951°N 1.15155°W	—	c. 1860	The farm buildings are on three sides of the farmyard which is enclosed by a wall. They are in magnesian limestone, with stone slate eaves courses, and a pantile roof, partly replaced in Welsh slate and sheet asbestos. The buildings consist of a barn with two storeys and five bays, and a two-storey three-bay cowhouse with a loft, linked by single-storey buildings, which include open-fronted pigsties, a cartshed, a dairy, and a shelter shed. The wall has chamfered copings, and it contains gate piers with pyramidal caps, and brick-arched pig troughs.	II
