= Listed buildings in Huntwick with Foulby and Nostell =

Huntwick with Foulby and Nostell is a civil parish in the metropolitan borough of the City of Wakefield, West Yorkshire, England. In the parish were 34 listed buildings that are recorded in the National Heritage List for England. Of these, three are listed at Grade I, the highest of the three grades, three are at Grade II*, the middle grade, and the others are at Grade II, the lowest grade. The most important building is Nostell Priory, which is listed, together with associated buildings, and structures in the surrounding park. The other major building is the Church of St. Michael and Our Lady, which is also listed, together with monuments in its churchyard. The other listed buildings are houses, cottages, farmhouses and farm buildings, and a bridge.

== Key ==
Grade	Criteria
I	Buildings of exceptional interest, sometimes considered to be internationally important
II*	Particularly important buildings of more than special interest
II	Buildings of national importance and special interest

== Buildings ==
Name and location	Photograph	Date	Notes	Grade
Monk's Refectory; 53.65051°N 1.38610°W	—	15th century (possible)	A building of uncertain function, in sandstone with some brick, a stone slate roof, and a timber framed core. There are two storeys, seven bays, and a rear outshut of three bays. The openings include chamfered doorways, four-centred arched doorways, mullioned windows, dormers, and slit vents.	II*
Church of St Michael and Our Lady, Wragby; 53.65061°N 1.38461°W		1533	The church is in sandstone with a stone slate roof, and is in Perpendicular style. It consists of a nave with a clerestory, north and south aisles, a south porch, a chancel, and a west tower. The tower is unbuttressed, and has a west doorway with a pointed arch, a moulded surround, and a hood mould, above which is a three-light window, and a niche with an ogee head and pinnacles between spiralled roundels. At the top is an embattled parapet with crocketed corner pinnacles; the nave, the aisles and the porch also have embattled parapets. The porch is gabled and contains a doorway with a pointed arch and a moulded surround, above which is a sundial.	I
Huntwick Grange; 53.67026°N 1.38700°W		Early to mid 17th century	The farmhouse, which has been extended, is in sandstone on a chamfered plinth, with a slate roof. There are two storeys and attics, a front range of two bays, two rear wings of differing widths, and a small side wing on the left. In the centre is a doorway, and the windows are of varying types, including sashes, cross windows, casements, mullioned windows, and transomed windows. At the rear is a Tudor arched doorway with a cambered lintel converted into a window.	II
Old Brewhouse; 53.65003°N 1.38714°W	—	Late 17th century (probable)	The brewhouse, later used for other purposes, is in sandstone on a chamfered plinth, with a stone slate roof. There are two storeys, a rectangular plan, and four bays. On the front is a segmental-headed wagon entry, and on each gable end is an external flight of stairs to a loft door. The windows either have a single light, or are mullioned.	II
Galverley and Crawshaw monuments 53.65034°N 1.38456°W	—	c. 1680	The monuments are in the churchyard of the Church of St. Michael and Our Lady, and are to the memory of Thomas Galverley and his wife, and to William Crawshaw. They are in sandstone and consist of raised slabs, the former on a low solid base, the latter raised on two low scrolled pedestals. Both have short inscriptions.	II
Nettleton monument 53.65045°N 1.38419°W	—	c. 1707	The monument is in the churchyard of the Church of St. Michael and Our Lady, and is to the memory of Elizabeth Nettleton and her husband. It is in sandstone, and consists of a tomb chest with plain sides, and a rectangular lid with a guilloché border enclosing a moulded semicircular head with winged angel heads in the spandrels. On the top is an inscription.	II
Hammond monument 53.65051°N 1.38442°W	—	Early 18th century	The monument is in the churchyard of the Church of St. Michael and Our Lady, and is to the memory of members of the Hammond family. It is in sandstone, and consists of a tomb chest with fielded side panels, and a rectangular lid with a bevelled edge. On the top is an inscription.	II
Hollings monument 53.65053°N 1.38466°W	—	Early 18th century	The monument is in the churchyard of the Church of St. Michael and Our Lady, and is to the memory of members of the Hollings family. It is in sandstone, and consists of a tomb chest with panelled sides and square baluster corners, and a raised shouldered panel with winged angel heads in the spandrels. On the top is an inscription.	II
Ash Cottage and Foulby Cottage; 53.65430°N 1.39712°W	—	Early to mid 18th century	A farmhouse, later divided, the building is in brown brick, with a moulded band, and a slate roof with a coped gable on the left. There are two storeys and three bays, and the windows are sashes.	II
Nostell Priory; 53.65271°N 1.39°W		1736–50	A large country house, its building was supervised by James Paine and later by Robert Adam, and the north wing was added in 1779–80. It is built in sandstone with stone slate roofs, and is in Palladian style. The east front has two storeys and a rusticated basement, and 13 symmetrical bays. The middle five bays have giant attached Ionic columns, a plain entablature and a dentilled pediment containing a large coat of arms. In front is a five-bay raised terrace flanked by curving flights of steps with a balustrade leading to a doorway with a pediment. The windows are sashes, those in the ground floor with pediments. The west front has a five-bay pedimented centre with giant Ionic pilasters. To the north is a three-bay link to the Family Wing, with five bays and a tetrastyle Ionic portico, and recessed to the south west is the kitchen pavilion with two storeys, attics and a basement, sides of three bays, and a pyramidal roof with a pedimented dormer in the centre of each side.	I
Cruse monument 53.65062°N 1.38426°W	—	c. 1741	The monument is in the churchyard of the Church of St. Michael and Our Lady, and is to the memory of members of the Cruse family. It is in sandstone, and consists of a raised monumental slab, with a low scrolled pedestal at each end. It is decorated with an incised round-arched head, a keystone, and a raised decorated initial "H".	II
Nostell Bridge; 53.65177°N 1.39268°W		1759–61	The bridge carries Doncaster Road (A638 road) over the junction of the Middle and Upper Lakes in the grounds of Nostell Priory. It is in sandstone, and consists of five segmental arches, rising in the middle. The bridge has triangular cutwaters rising to pilasters, a moulded band, and a low parapet with iron railings. Under each arch is a weir with a central sluice.	II*
Summer House, Nostell Priory; 53.65340°N 1.39365°W		1765	The building, also known as Menagerie House, is in rendered brick with sandstone dressings. The original part is by James Paine and the lower flanking wings were added in about 1776 by Robert Adam. The building is in Gothic style, with a single storey, moulded cornices, embattled parapets, and doorways with pointed arches and rusticated long and short surrounds. The original part is canted at the front and rectangular at the rear. Each wing contains a coved niche.	II
Stables, Nostell Priory; 53.65189°N 1.38899°W		1769–73	The stable block is in sandstone with roofs of stone slate, slate, and glass, and consists of four ranges enclosing a courtyard. The south and west ranges were designed by Robert Adam, and the north and east ranges were added in 1827–29 by James Pritchett and Charles Watson. The north entrance range has two storeys and 17 bays. The middle five bays contain the entrance archway, and are flanked by five-bay blind arcades linking to one-bay corner pavilions. In the centre of the roof is a two-stage clock tower, the first stage with clock faces under pediments, and the upper stage a circular bellcote with a lead-clad dome and a weathervane. The south range contains a central Riding House, a Green House, and a Garden House, and ends in pavilions. In the centre is a bowed loggia with giant round-headed arches, a frieze and a cornice. The outer houses have five-bay Doric colonnades, and in the pavilions are Venetian windows.	I
Barn, Horncastle Farm; 53.64041°N 1.39722°W		Late 18th century (probable)	The barn forms the north side of the farmyard. It is in brick with a dentilled eaves cornice, and a roof of stone slate and some Welsh slate, and with coped gables. There is a rectangular plan with five bays, the middle bay taller, with two storeys and a gable. It contains a segmental-headed doorway in a recessed round-headed arch containing a plaque, and above is a dentilled pediment with a blind oculus. In the outer bays are recessed round-headed arches containing various openings, including a loading door.	II
Japonica House; 53.65422°N 1.39696°W	—	Late 18th century	The house is in brown brick with a moulded floor band and a stone slate roof. There are two storeys and three bays. The doorway and the windows have segmental heads, and the windows have gauged brick heads and altered glazing.	II
Circular pond, fountain and statue, Nostell Priory; 53.65135°N 1.38913°W		Late 18th century (probable)	In the Rose Garden to the south of the stables is a circular pond about 5 metres (16 ft) in diameter with a surround in sandstone, and with a moulded rim. In the centre is a fountain consisting of a tall hexagonal pedestal surmounted by a bronze statue depicting a seated female surrounded by scallop dishes. The figure has a dish on her lap, and holds over it a spout in the form of a mollusc shell.	II
Gate to Rose Garden, Nostell Priory; 53.65138°N 1.38965°W	—	Late 18th century	The garden gate at the entrance to the Rose Garden is in wrought iron. The standards have open scrollwork and scrolled cresting, the lower panels have dog-bars, and in the upper panels is scrolled tracery.	II
Gothick Arch, Nostell Priory; 53.65295°N 1.39357°W		Late 18th century (probable)	The arch is over a footpath in the grounds of the house, it is in sandstone with brick in the interior, and in Gothic style. There are pointed arches at the front and rear, flanked by the remains of blind cruciform arrow slits. Inside is an oval brick-lined lobby with a groin vaulted roof.	II
Pair of urns, Summer House; 53.65338°N 1.39355°W	—	Late 18th century (probable)	There are two urns by the front corners of the Summer House. Each urn has a small square pedestal in sandstone, and the urn is in limestone, carved with putti holding swags of fruit.	II
Sundial, Nostell Priory; 53.65137°N 1.38912°W	—	Late 18th century (probable)	The sundial to the south of the Stables is in limestone and consists of a vase pedestal with a gadrooned base and a moulded cap. On the top is a brass plate and a gnomon.	II
Two vases near the sundial, Nostell Priory; 53.65133°N 1.38909°W	—	Late 18th century (probable)	The vases are in marble, and each has a square base with low tapered pedestal carrying a wide shallow bowl with a moulded side. There are foliated patterns on the under side, and a flared rim.	II
Obelisk Lodge and walls, Nostell Priory; 53.66212°N 1.38604°W		1776–77	The lodge was designed by Robert and James Adam, and consists of a narrow pyramid, in which is a round-headed archway. The archway is surrounded by a Tuscan doorcase with an entablature, a fluted frieze, and a moulded cornice. Above it is a blind oeil-de-boeuf, and through the archway is a moulded impost band. On each side is a small screen wall ending in a square pier, and the double gates are in wrought iron.	II*
Wragby Lodge, gateway and wails, Nostell Priory; 53.64969°N 1.38549°W		1776–77	A pair of lodges designed by Robert and James Adam. Each lodge is in sandstone, with rusticated quoins, an impost band, a low pyramidal roof, a single storey, and a square plan. On the front facing the road is a recessed round-headed arch containing a round-headed sash window, and in the front facing the drive is a doorway with a plain surround. Between the lodges are square gate piers, each with a frieze containing a floral medallion, and a swept cap. There are double main wrought iron gates and single side gates. Attached to the outer corners of the lodges are curved concave screen walls.	II
Foulby Lodge; 53.65418°N 1.39686°W	—	c. 1800	A former lodge to Nostell Priory, it is in rendered brick with a stone slate roof. In the centre is a gabled bay with two storeys, flanked by full-height lean-to wings, and a small lean-to on the left. In the centre is a doorway with a cornice, a pediment on consoles, and side windows, and above it is a tripartite window with three keystones. The side wings contain sash windows.	II
Garden railings with two gates, Nostell Priory; 53.65325°N 1.38988°W	—	Late 18th or early 19th century	The railings run from the north wing of the house to Middle Lake. They are in wrought iron and extend for about 75 metres (246 ft), and are of simple looped construction. The two gateways have ornamental open-work panels with dog-bars in the bottom panels, stylised foliation in the centre, scrolls in the top, and scrolled ramped cresting.	II
Bridge, boathouse and basin, Lower Lake; 53.65539°N 1.38531°W		Early 19th century	On the east side of Lower Lake, Nostell Priory, is an oval basin about 20 metres (66 ft) across with an outlet sluice, a boathouse and a bridge, the latter two in sandstone. The bridge on the west side carries a private road, and consists of a single segmental arch with rusticated voussoirs and a keystone, a moulded band, chamfered coping, and ornamental railings, and is flanked by channelled piers. The boathouse on the south side has a segmental-arched opening.	II
Farm buildings northwest of the Lodge; 53.65015°N 1.38661°W	—	c. 1830	A coach house, later used for other purposes, it is in sandstone on a plinth, with a floor band, a moulded eaves band, and a stone slate roof with coped pedimented gables and two square ventilators. There is a single storey, the original coach house has three bays, and a five-bay wing on the right. The middle bays of the coach house and the wing project under pediments. In the centre of the coach house is a blocked carriage arch infilled with casement windows, and elsewhere are sash windows, doorways, and loading doors.	II
The Kennels in the Estate Yard; 53.65084°N 1.38692°W	—	c. 1830	The kennels are in sandstone with stone slate roofs and coped gables, and have a single storey and a quadrangular plan. The north range has nine openings, the middle three projecting under a pediment. In the east and west ranges are open-fronted sheds with cast iron columns, and on the south side is a low wall with railings and central gates.	II
Farm buildings to south-west of Monk's Rectory; 53.65047°N 1.38641°W	—	c. 1840	An animal house or stable, it is in sandstone on a plinth, with a moulded eaves band, and a stone slate roof with coped pedimented gables and two square ventilators. There is a single storey and seven bays, the centre projecting under a pediment, and containing a doorway with a fanlight. At the rear are two doorways with fanlights, and the windows are shuttered.	II
Farm building north of the Old Brewhouse; 53.65029°N 1.38714°W	—	c. 1845	The farm building is in sandstone on a plinth, with a floor band, a moulded eaves band, and a stone slate roof with coped pedimented gables. There are two storeys and an east front of seven bays, the fourth and fifth bays projecting under a pediment. This contains a doorway with a fanlight, to the right is a segmental-arched carriage opening, and elsewhere are casement windows. The north front has five bays. Beyond is a single-storey open cart shed with seven cast iron columns. The rear wall is in brick with two columns, and behind are workshops.	II
Cottage and outbuildings south of the Estate Office; 53.65044°N 1.38754°W	—	c. 1845	The cottage, cart shed, and coach house are in sandstone with stone slate roofs. The cottage has a band, moulded eaves, two storeys, and three bays, the middle bay projecting under a pediment. The central doorway has a fanlight, and the windows are sashes. To the right is a single-storey wing. To the left is a single-storey former cart shed, and beyond that is a coach house with a pedimented front and a segmental-arched doorway.	II
The Lodge, Estate Yard; 53.64987°N 1.38659°W	—	c. 1845	The lodge is in sandstone, with a floor band, moulded eaves, and a stone slate roof with coped pedimented gables. There are two storeys and an L-shaped plan. The west front has three bays, the middle bay projecting under a pediment. In the centre is a doorway with a fanlight, and the windows are sashes.	II
Estate Office; 53.65081°N 1.38738°W	—	1847	The estate office, converted into a private house in about 1990, is in red brick with stone dressings and a Welsh slate roof. There are two storeys and a front of four bays, the middle two bays projecting under a pediment with an oval window. In the centre is a Doric porch and a doorway with a fanlight, above which is a plaque with a coat of arms. The windows are sashes with wedge lintels.	II
