= Wadworth Hall =

Manor house in Wadworth, South Yorkshire, England

Coordinates: 53.4690°N 1.1473°W

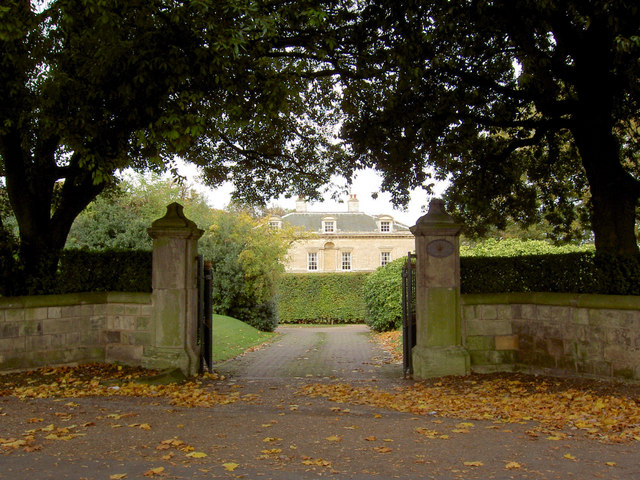
Wadworth Hall

Wadworth Hall is a grade I listed Manor House, in the village of Wadworth (near Doncaster), England. It was built in 1749 for the Wordsworth family by the renowned northern architect James Paine. It is currently a private residence and has been since approximately 1995. The house, however, has served a number of purposes over the past 250 years.

The building is constructed of magnesian limestone ashlar with a Westmorland slate roof. The main block is 3 by 4 bays in two storeys with attics with a later service wing attached.

== History ==
The Wordsworth name appeared in the 11th century after a wave of migration was caused by the Norman Conquest of Britain in 1066. The Wordsworth Family lived in Yorkshire at 'Wadsuuorde' or Wadsworth.

First found in Yorkshire, the family were seated at Wadsworth, recorded in the Domesday Book in 1086 as 'king's land', a moorland with two churches and scattered houses. An isolated building within the village is said to be the setting of Emily Brontë's famous novel Wuthering Heights. The village was granted by William the Conqueror to Roger de Bully (believed to be the ancestor of the Wadsworths) following the Norman Conquest.

The estate passed to the Ross family in the 19th century. Polar explorer James Clark Ross had married Anne Coulman, daughter of the then owner, in 1843 after returning from Antarctica; his name appears in the West Riding Electoral Registers of 1860, 1861 and 1862, "Qualification: Freehold Mansion and Land", "Place: Wadworth hall".

After its use as a family home, it was sold to the West Riding County Council in 1957 and was transformed into a nursing home before it was then sold on to a firm of architects, who converted it into offices. In the mid-1990s, the architects downsized and Andrew Cusack moved his computing business in on part of the ground floor of the hall. A year later, the opportunity arose for Cusack to purchase the hall.

== See also ==
- Grade I listed buildings in South Yorkshire
- Listed buildings in Wadworth
