= James Paine (sculptor) =

English painter

James Paine the younger (1745–1829) was an English architect, artist, and sculptor.

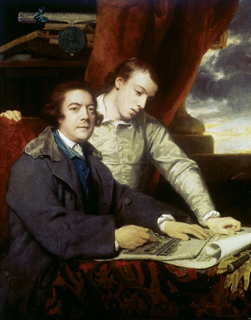
James Paine father and son, portrait by Joshua Reynolds

== Life ==
The only son of James Paine the elder, he studied at the St. Martin's Lane Academy. He also had access to the Richmond House classical collection, opened to the Society of Artists of Great Britain by his father's efforts, from 1770.

Paine appears to have travelled in Italy. His father, by his will dated February 1786, probably left his son financially independent. In 1788 he had residences in both North End, Hammersmith, and Salisbury Street. In 1791 he was one of the original fifteen members of the Architects' Club.

== Legacy ==
On 12 March 1830, Christie sold the pictures, casts, books of architecture, and other items "the property of J. Paine, Esq., Architect (deceased)". Among them were the account and other books by Nicholas Stone, and his son, Henry Stone, formerly belonging to George Vertue. They went to Sir John Soane's Museum. A large volume with "J. Paine, jun. Archt. Rome, 1774", on the outside, containing 57 drawings of studies at Rome, all signed by him (plans of four palaces, views at Albano and Tivoli, measured drawings of the Ponte Rotto, and a number of statues with their measurements), went in time to the South Kensington Museum.

== Works ==
Paine exhibited "stained drawings" at the Spring Gardens exhibitions of 1761, 1764, and 1790. On his return from Italy, he sent to the exhibitions of the Royal Academy some architectural drawings (in 1781 and 1783), and in 1788 an Intended Bridge across Lough Foyle at Derry. He had just one architectural commission built. As a monumental sculptor, he designed the memorial to William Powell in Bristol Cathedral, and other works.

== Notes ==
Attribution

This article incorporates text from a publication now in the public domain: Lee, Sidney, ed. (1895). "Paine, James (d.1829?)". Dictionary of National Biography. Vol. 43. London: Smith, Elder & Co.
