= Scene from Shakespeare's The Tempest =

Painting by William Hogarth, c. 1730–1735

Scene from Shakespeare's The Tempest by Hogarth; circa 1735

Scene from Shakespeare's The Tempest, also known as Ferdinand courting Miranda (c. 1730–1735) is an oil painting by the English painter William Hogarth. It has been displayed at Nostell Priory since 1766, and was acquired by the National Trust in 2002. The National Trust claims that it is "the first known painting of a scene from Shakespeare".

The painting is a rich and vibrant example of Hogarth's work, painted c. 1730–1735 as a special project for one of his devoted band of patrons—George Parker, 2nd Earl of Macclesfield—as part of Hogarth's attempt to found an distinctively British school of history painting. It is thought that Hogarth was hoping that more commissions for similar scenes would come flowing in after painting this scene, but this did not happen.

It measures 80 by 106.5 centimetres (31.5 in × 41.9 in) and depicts a scene from act 1, scene ii, of William Shakespeare's play, The Tempest, with Ferdinand courting Miranda. Miranda is depicted sitting on a throne made of shells and coral, distracted and thus spilling from a bowl of milk that she has been feeding to a lamb. To the left is her father Prospero, and further left is Ferdinand. The spirit Ariel floats above, playing a lute or mandolin. To the right is the misshapen monster Caliban, carrying a bundle of foraged wood upon his back, grimacing and drooling as he stamps on a dove.

The painting was bought from the Earl of Macclesfield's widow in 1766 by Sir Rowland Winn, 5th Baronet, and was hung on the walls of Nostell Priory, near Wakefield, West Yorkshire, England, for over two centuries by the Winn Baronets and then their relatives the Barons St Oswald. Nostell Priory was acquired by the National Trust in 1953, but the former owners retained most of the contents. When the 6th Baron St Oswald announced his wish to sell the painting in 2002, it was bought by the National Trust, with the whole cost of nearly £300,000 funded with a grant from the Art Fund.

== Bibliography ==
- "Ferdinand Paying Court to Miranda, with Prospero Behind Her, Caliban to the Right, and Ariel Above by William Hogarth". Art Fund. 2002. Archived from the original on 29 March 2018.
- Kennedy, Maev (14 November 2002). "Grant saves Hogarth's take on The Tempest". The Guardian. Archived from the original on 29 March 2018.
- "Ferdinand courting Miranda (from William Shakespeare's The Tempest, act I, scene ii)". National Trust. n.d.
- Pask, Kevin (2013). The Fairy Way of Writing: Shakespeare to Tolkien. Johns Hopkins University Press. ISBN 9781421410746.
- Paulson, Ronald (1992). Hogarth: The "modern moral subject", 1697–1732. James Clarke & Co. ISBN 9780718828547.
- "Room 9: High Art". Tate Britain. n.d. Archived from the original on 9 October 2012.
