= James Paine (architect) =

English architect (1717–1789)

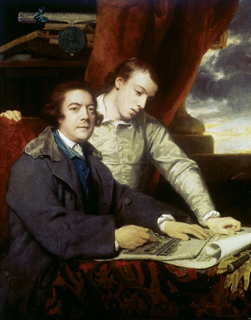
- James Paine father and son, portrait by Joshua Reynolds
- Born: late 1717; Andover, Hampshire, Kingdom of Great Britain
- Died: Autumn 1789 (aged 71–72); Kingdom of France
- Occupation: Architect
- Spouse: 1. Sarah Jennings 2. Charlotte Beaumont
- Children: James Paine; Charlotte Charlton; Mary "Polly" Kettle
- Buildings: Heath House Nostell Priory; Kedleston Hall; Doncaster Mansion House; Chatsworth House; Worksop Manor; Hickleton Hall

James Paine (1717–1789) was an English architect. He worked on number of country houses such as Chatsworth House, Thorndon Hall and Kedleston Hall.

== Early life ==
James Paine was probably baptised 9 October 1717 at Andover, Hampshire, the youngest of the five children of John Paine (d. 1727), carpenter, of Andover, and his wife, Jane Head (bap. 1684).

Whilst facts about Paine's early life are sparse, it is thought that he studied at the St Martin's Lane Academy, London, founded by William Hogarth in 1735 to allow artists to practise life drawing. Here he came into contact with many innovative architects, artists designers, including architect Isaac Ware.

== Career ==
It is thought that Ware introduced him to Richard Boyle, 3rd Earl of Burlington and his circle of friends. Paine’s first professional job, aged only nineteen, was as the Clerk of Works supervising the building of Nostell Priory, Yorkshire (c.1737–1750), designed by Colonel James Moyser, a friend of Lord Burlington. Essentially a Palladian, Paine was to work on many other projects in the area including Heath House in the village of Heath in between Nostell Priory and Wakefield.

Paine lived in Pontefract whilst working at Nostell Priory, and whilst working on that project, he was also commissioned to design the Mansion House, Doncaster, Yorkshire between 1745 and 1748.

From the 1750s, he had his own practice, and designed many villas, usually consisting of a central building, often with a fine staircase, and two symmetrical wings. The most important house which he was involved with was Kedleston Hall, Derbyshire where he succeeded Matthew Brettingham from 1759 to 1760 and suggested the colonnaded hall, but he was himself displaced by Robert Adam, who altered his designs.

At around the same time, he designed the very grand stables at Chatsworth House in the same county. He was a favourite architect of the powerful Catholic families of the time. In the 1760s he was commissioned to rebuild Worksop Manor for Edward Howard, 9th Duke of Norfolk as well as the new Thorndon Hall (1764–70) in Essex for Robert Petre, 9th Baron Petre and his house on Park Lane, London. From 1770 to 1776, he built New Wardour Castle in Wiltshire (which featured as the Royal Ballet School in the film Billy Elliot).

Paine held various posts, some sinecures, in the Office of Works culminating in appointment as one of the two Architects of the Works in 1780 but lost the post in a reorganisation in 1782. He was appointed High Sheriff of Surrey for 1783.

His practice declined in his later years as he refused to participate in the Neoclassical fashions established by the Adam brothers. He published much of his own work in his two volumes of Plans, elevations and sections of Noblemen and Gentlemen's Houses (1767 and 1783).

In 1789, Paine retired to France, where he died in the autumn.

== Personal life ==
Paine married twice. His first wife was Sarah Jennings, daughter and coheir of George Jennings of Pontefract. They married in March 1741 and had a son, the architect, sculptor, and topographical watercolourist James Paine (1745–1829).

After Sarah's death, Paine married Charlotte Beaumont (1722–1766), youngest daughter of Richard Beaumont of Whitley Beaumont, near Huddersfield. They were married by June 1748 and had two daughters, Charlotte (1751 – 31 October 1814) and Mary, known as 'Polly' (1753-1798). Charlotte married St John Charlton on 22 December 1781, who later became High Sheriff of Shropshire in 1790 and the couple lived at Apley Castle. Mary married artist Tilly Kettle, with a dowry of £5,000.

In 1773 Paine bought the lease to Sayes Court, a country estate near Chertsey in Surrey. He became a justice of the peace for Middlesex in December 1776 and for Surrey in June 1777, and served as High Sheriff of Surrey in 1785.

== Portraits by Joshua Reynolds ==
Paine was a friend of artist Joshua Reynolds and had designed a large gallery and painting room, with an elaborate chimney piece, for Reynolds’ home in Leicester Fields, now Leicester Square, London. In 1764, Reynolds painted a joint portrait of James Paine father and son pictured above (now in the Ashmolean Museum, Oxford). The following year Reynolds painted a matching portrait of Charlotte and her two daughters, Charlotte and Mary "Polly", possibly in exchange for some of Paine’s architectural work at his home. This portrait is now in Lady Lever Art Gallery, Liverpool. The portraits were intended to be hung so that the father and son faced mother and daughters. Reynolds’s appointment book records an entry for their sittings:

'17 July 1765 Mrs Pain [sic], Miss Pain and Miss Polly Pain.' Then, on 25 July, 'Mrs Paine etc.' on 2 August 'Miss Paine' sat alone, and 'Mrs Paine' sat three days later. On 3 October the entry read: 'Mrs Paine & Co'. There were further appointments on 27 September, 27 November and 2 December, for 'Dog.'

The portrait Mrs James Paine, and Her Daughters Charlotte Paine, b.1751, Later Mrs St John Charlton and Mary 'Polly' Paine, 1753–1798, Later Mrs Tilly Kettle) was exhibited twice in Yorkshire in late nineteenth century, and copies were made. It was eventually acquired by the art dealer C.J Wertheimer but when it was shown at Burlington House in 1908, it was catalogued as Portraits of the Misses Paine, their mother Charlotte having been painted out to increase its sale value. William Hesketh Lever paid £4520. 5s for in 1918. In 1935, the Lady Lever Art Gallery Trustees took the decision to remove the over painting and restored Mrs Paine to her rightful place.

== Legacy ==
In 2017, the Friends of Mansion House, Doncaster led on the James Paine Festival, celebrating his life and work on the 300th anniversary of his birth.

== List of architectural works ==
- Axwell House, Blaydon, County Durham (1758)
- Coxhoe Hall, Coxhoe, County Durham (c. 1754, additions later demolished)
- Gibside Hall, County Durham (1773-1776, chapel and renovation)
- Hardwick Hall and gardens, Sedgefield, County Durham (c. 1754–1757)
- Raby Castle, Staindrop, County Durham (c. 1753–1760, remodelled and additions made)
- Chatsworth House, Bakewell, Derbyshire (1756–1767, new wing and outbuildings)
- Stoke Hall, Grindleford, Derbyshire (1757)
- Kedleston Hall, Kedleston, Derbyshire (1758–1763)
- Cowick Hall, Cowick, East Riding of Yorkshire (1752–1760, alterations)
- Thorndon Hall, Ingrave, Essex (1764–1770)
- Northumberland House, City of London, Greater London (c. 1753–1757, picture gallery)
- Lumley House, South Audley Street, Mayfair, Greater London (1766, alterations)
- 47 Leicester Square, Westminster, Greater London (1760–61, painting room)
- 79 Pall Mall, Westminster, Greater London (1769–71, since demolished)
- 17 & 19 St. James Square, Westminster, Greater London (c. 1754–1760, remodelling)
- 76 St Martin's Lane, Westminster, Greater London (1752-1754, Paine's own home since demolished)
- Dover House, Whitehall, Greater London (1755–1758)
- 14 Downing Street, Whitehall, Greater London (c. 1763–1766, alterations)
- St Paul's Walden Bury, St Paul's Walden, Hertfordshire (1767, north range)
- Brocket Hall, Welwyn Garden City, Hertfordshire (c. 1760–1775, rebuilt house and grounds buildings)
- Cavendish Bridge, Castle Donington, Leicestershire (1758-1761)
- Gopsall Hall, Gopsall, Leicestershire (c. 1764, garden temple)
- Ormsby Hall, South Ormsby, Lincolnshire (1752–1755, re-build)
- Wilsford Manor, Wilsford, Lincolnshire, (additions 1749, since demolished)
- Felbrigg Hall, Felbrigg, Norfolk (1751–1756, new wing and decoration)
- Alnwick Castle, Alnwick, Northumberland (c. 1754–1768, interior and keep)
- Belford Hall, Belford, Northumberland (c. 1754–1756)
- Bywell Hall, Bywell, Northumberland (c. 1760)
- Blagdon Hall, Cramlington, Northumberland (1752, second floor installed)
- Gosforth House, Gosforth, Northumberland (1755–1764)
- Wallington Bridge, Wallington Demesne, Northumberland (1755)
- Stockeld Park, Spofforth, North Yorkshire (1758–63)
- Serlby Hall, Blyth, Nottinghamshire (1751–1777)
- Worksop Manor, Worksop, Nottinghamshire (1761–1767, since demolished)
- Cusworth Hall, Cusworth, South Yorkshire (1749–1753, wings added)
- Dinnington Hall, Dinnington, South Yorkshire (c. 1751–1757, alterations)
- Mansion House, Doncaster, South Yorkshire (1745–48)
- Hickleton Hall, Hickleton, South Yorkshire (1745–1749, house and stables)
- High Melton Hall, High Melton, South Yorkshire (c. 1750)
- Sandbeck Park, Maltby, South Yorkshire (c. 1763–1768)
- Sprotbrough Hall, Sprotbrough, South Yorkshire (c. 1750)
- Wadworth Hall, Wadworth, South Yorkshire (c. 1749–1750)
- Chillington Hall, Brewood, Staffordshire bridge (c. 1770, bridge and temples, 1772–1773)
- Weston Park, Weston-under-Lizard, Staffordshire (c. 1760, temple and bridge)
- Shrubland Park, Coddenham, Suffolk (c. 1770–1772)
- Bagshot Park, Bagshot, Surrey (1770–1772, remodelled interiors)
- Bramham Park, Bramham, West Yorkshire (c. 1760)
- The Biggin, Bramham cum Oglethorpe, West Yorkshire (1750–1756, alterations)
- Kirkstall Grange, Headingley, West Yorkshire (1752)
- Milnsbridge Hall, Milnsbridge, West Yorkshire (c. 1750)
- Nostell Priory, Nostell, West Yorkshire (c. 1737 – 1750, interiors)
- 17, Cornmarket, Pontefract, West Yorkshire (c. 1745–1750)
- 5 Market Place, Pontefract, Yorkshire (c. 1750–1755)
- Old Heath Hall, Warmfield cum Heath, West Yorkshire (1744–1745)

== Gallery of architectural works ==
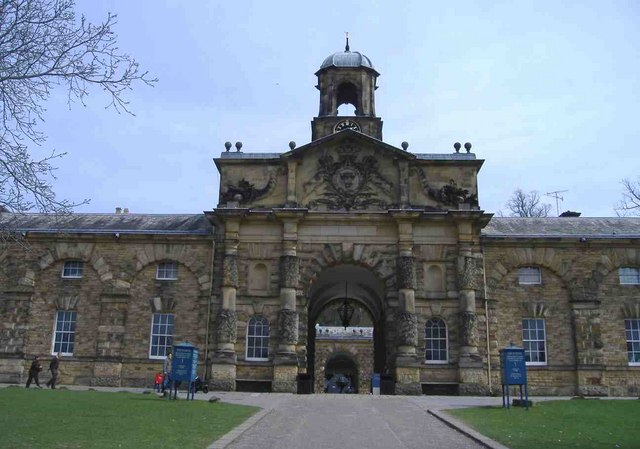
Chatsworth House, Derbyshire, stables

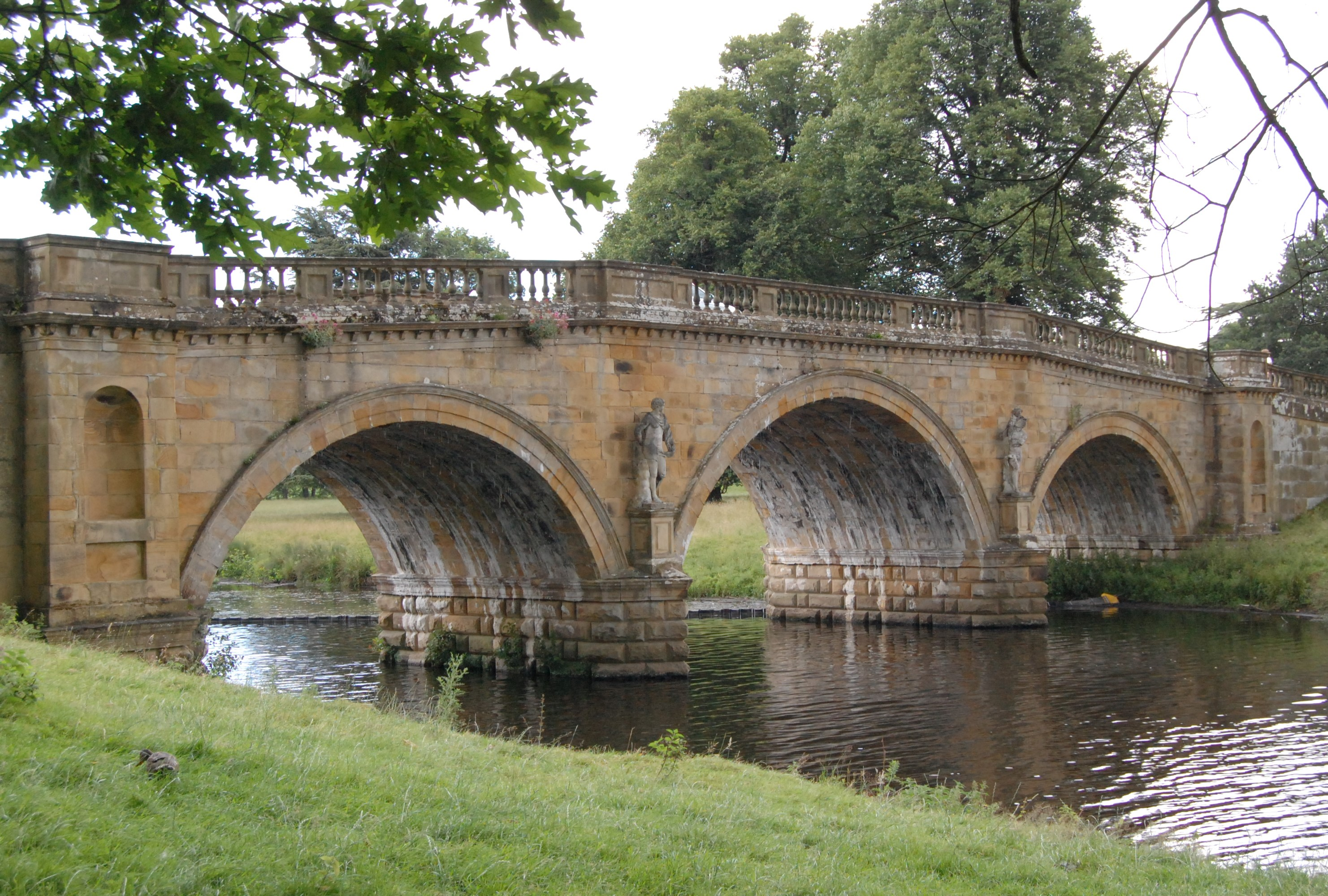
Bridge, Chatsworth

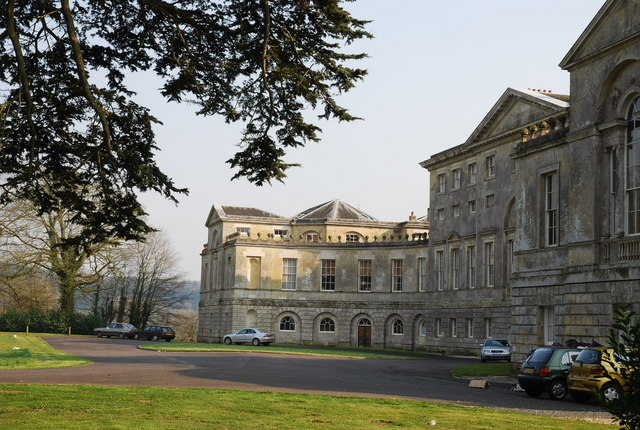
New Wardour Castle, Wiltshire

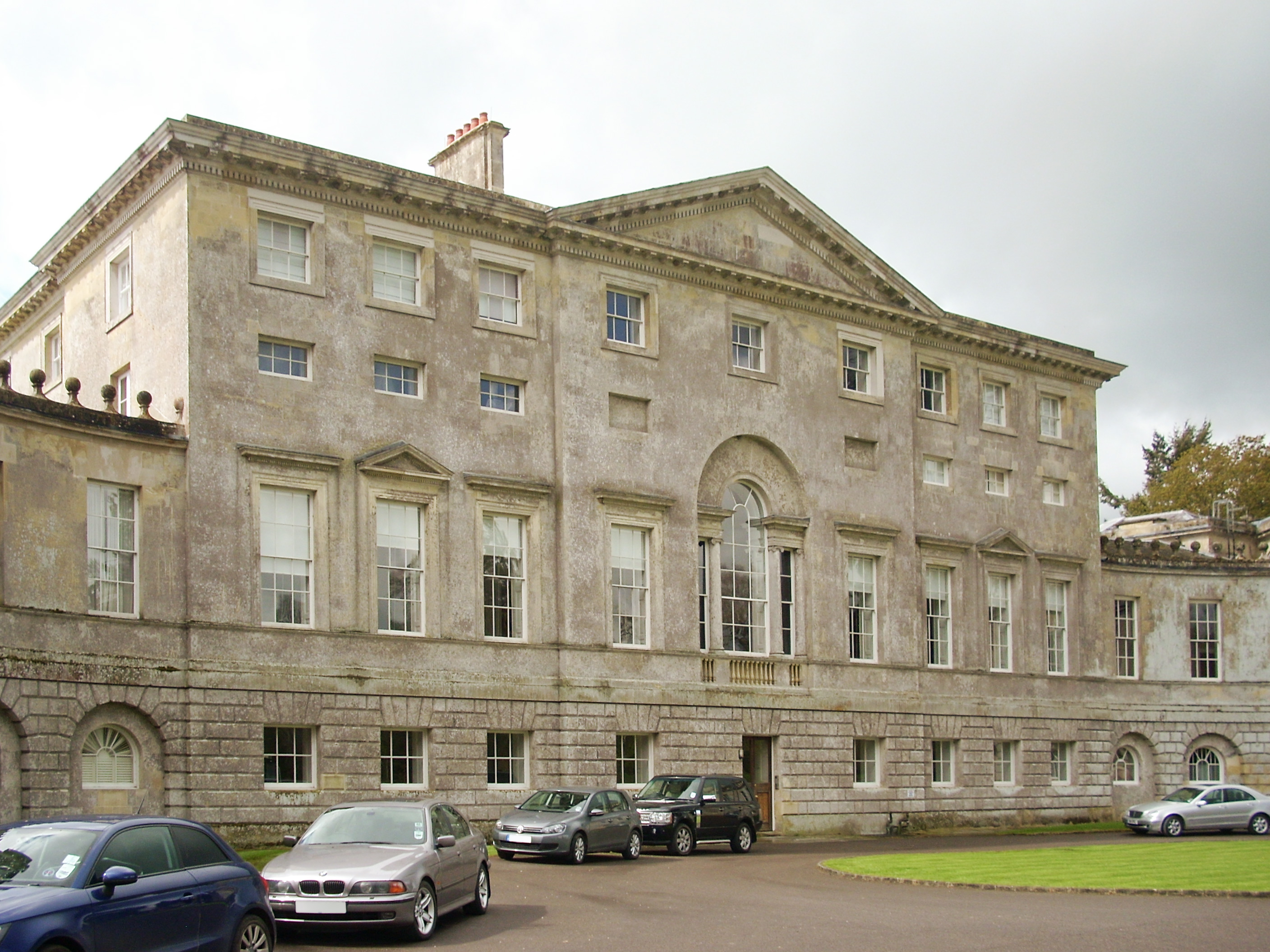
New Wardour Castle, Wiltshire

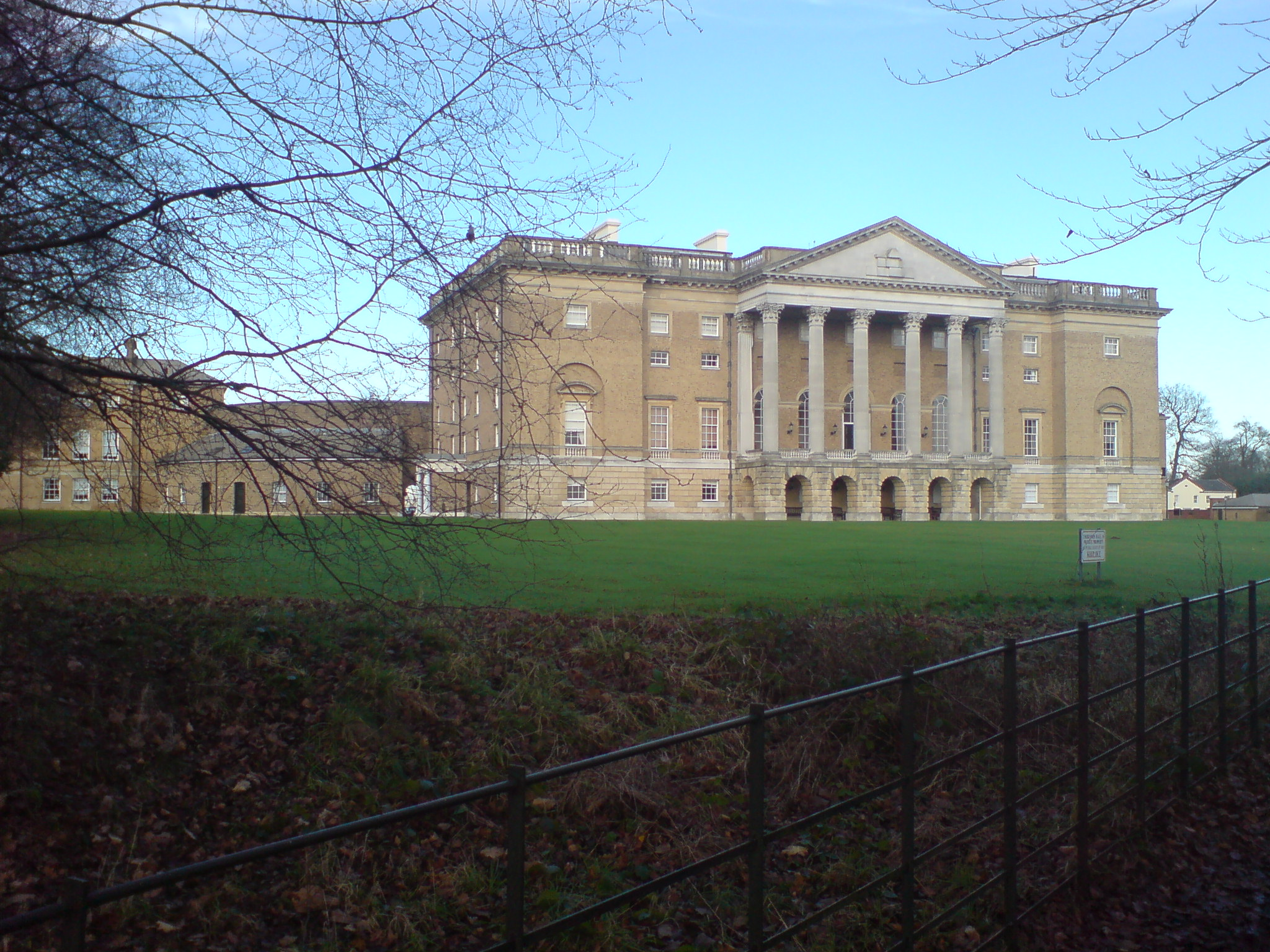
Thorndon Hall, Essex

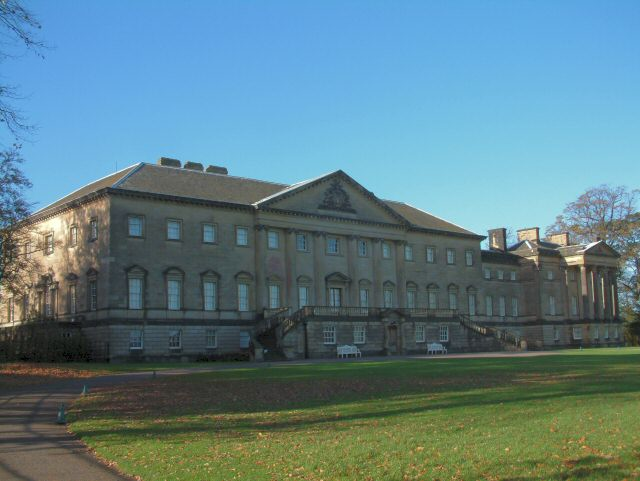
Nostell Priory, Yorkshire

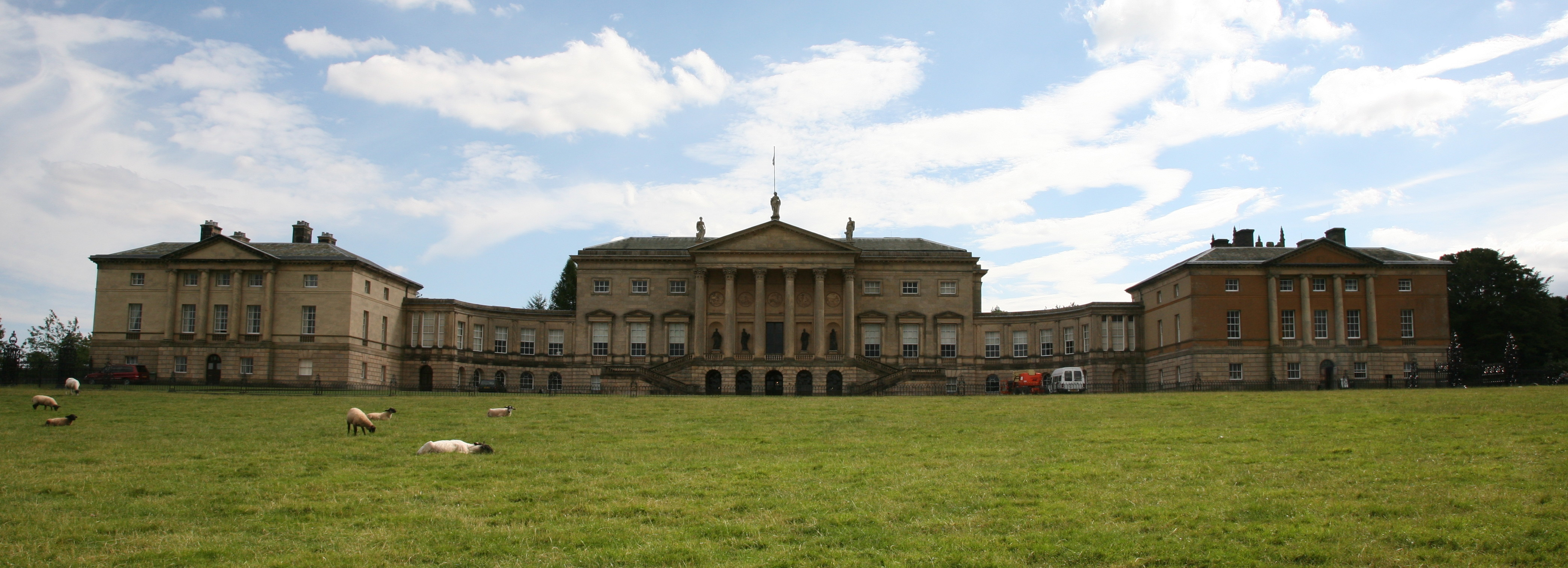
Kedleston Hall, Derbyshire, north front

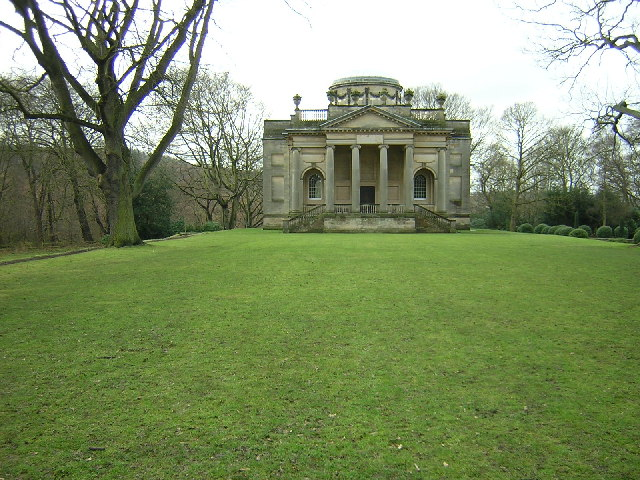
Gibside Chapel, County Durham

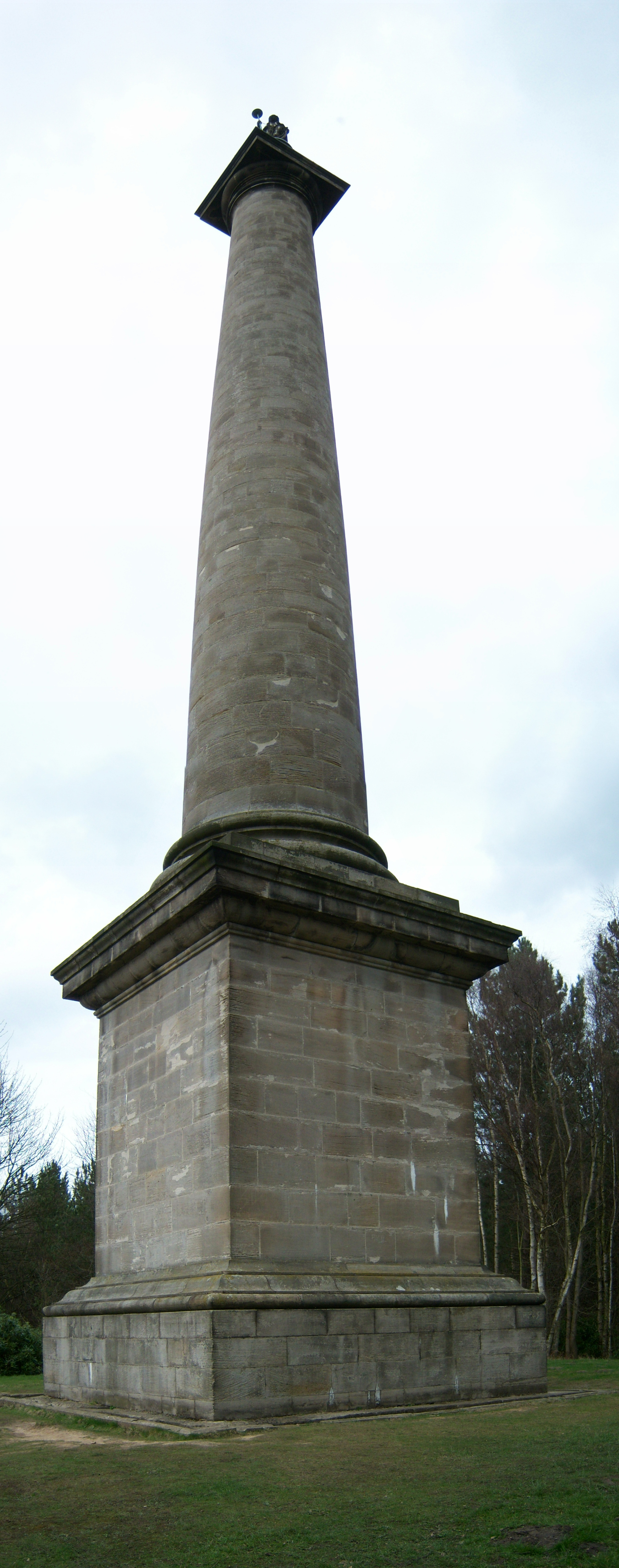
Gibside, Column of British Liberty

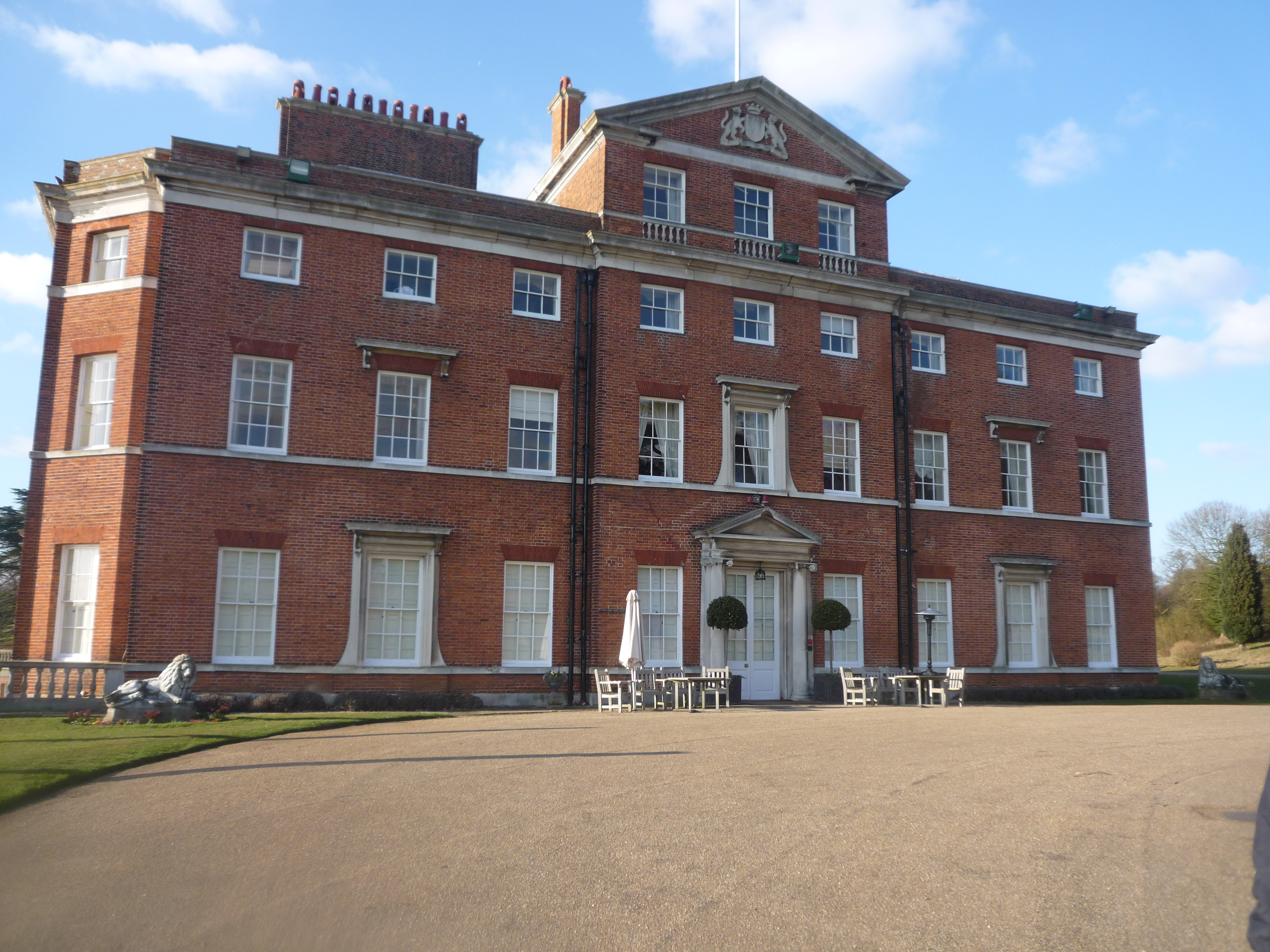
Entrance front, Brocket Hall

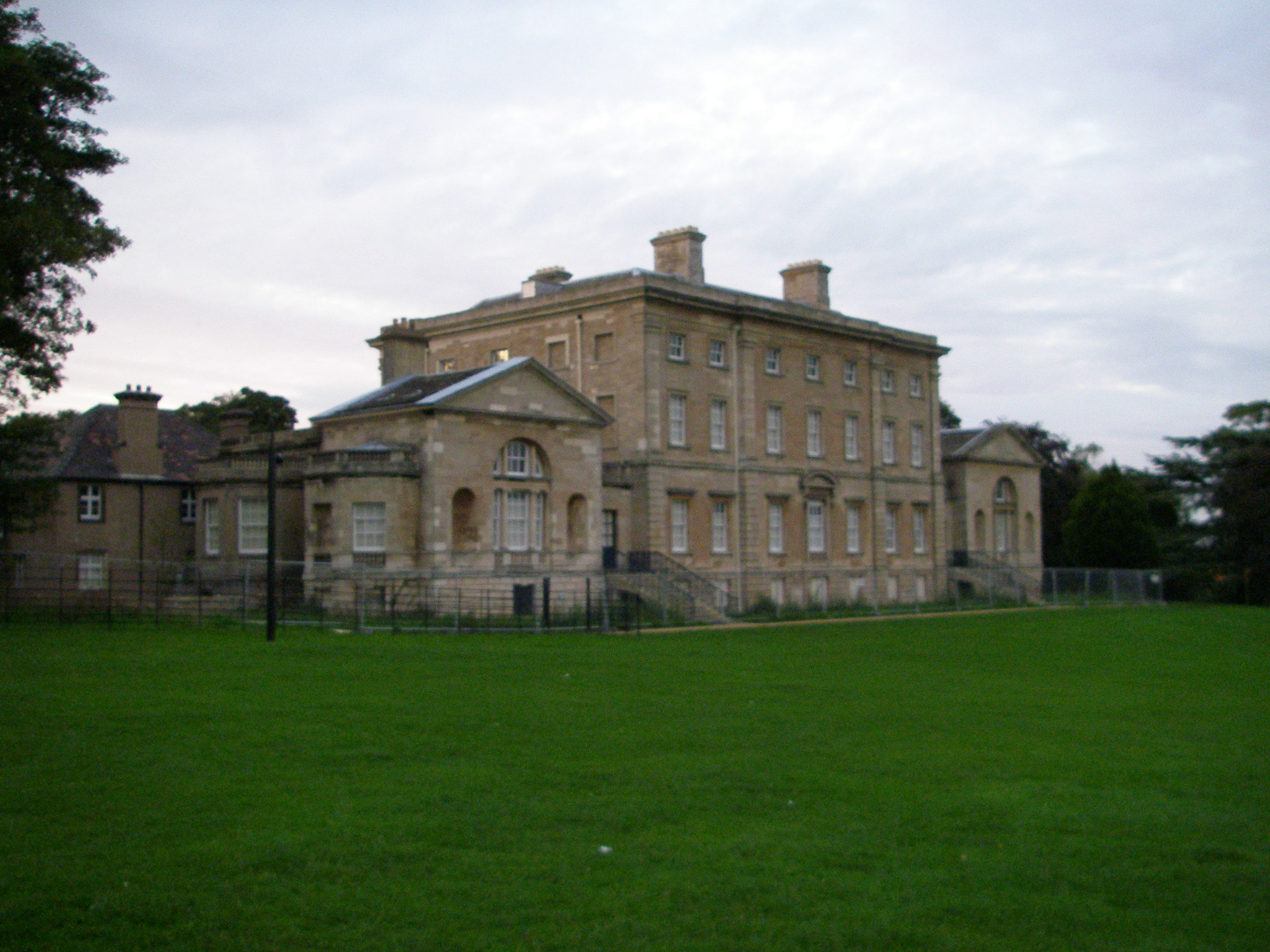
Cusworth Hall, the wings are by Paine

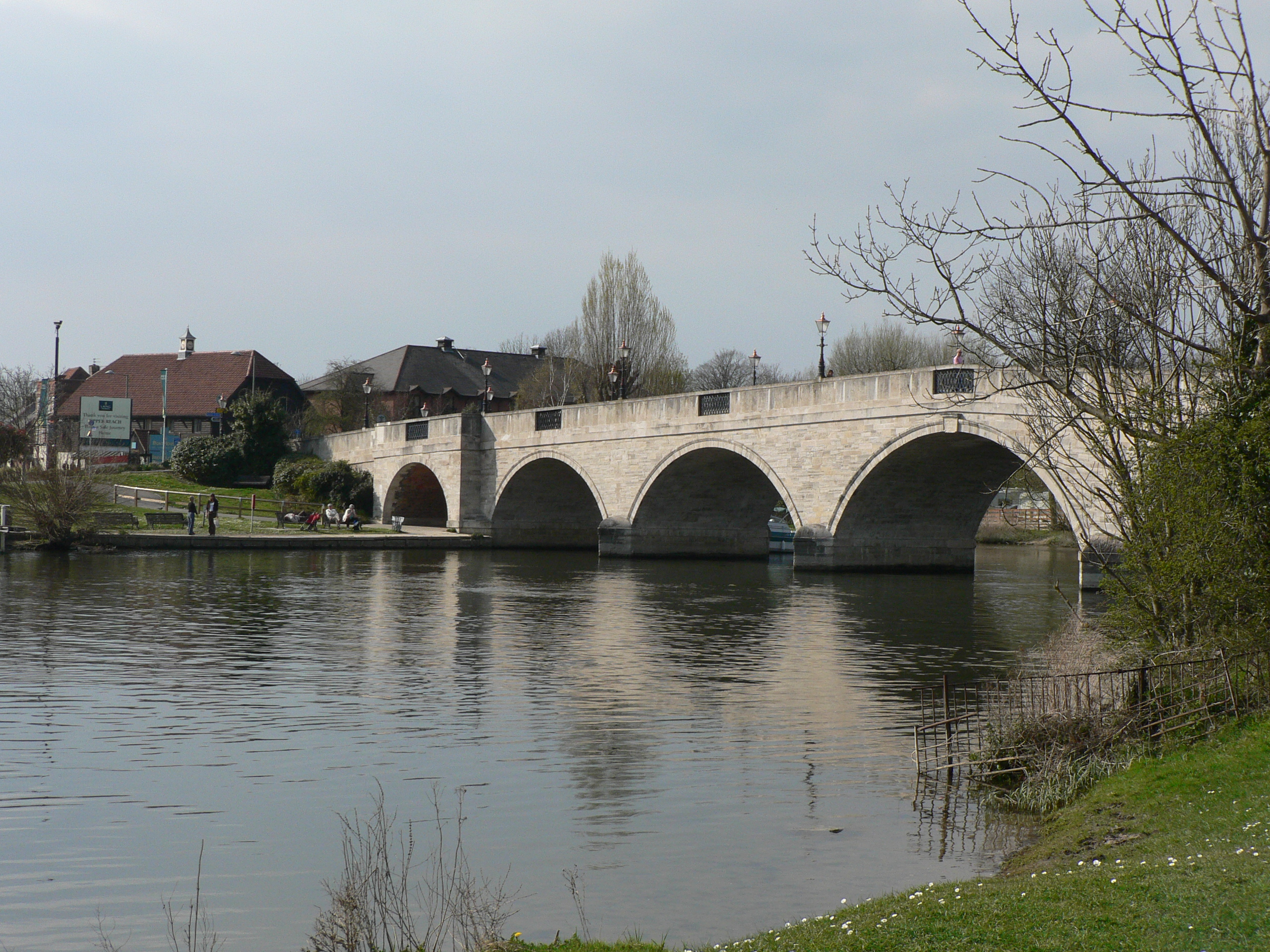
Chertsey Bridge, Surrey

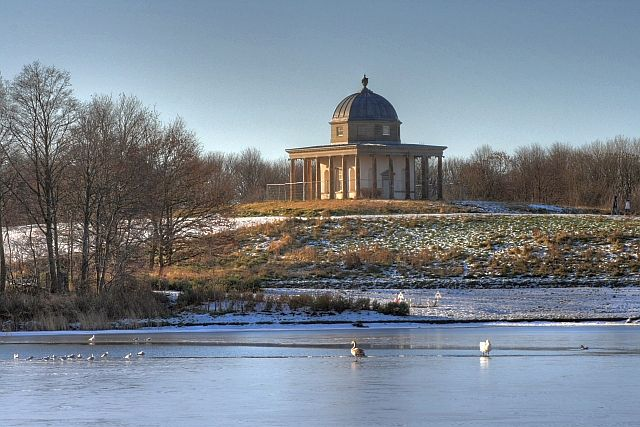
Temple of Minerva, Hardwick Sedgefield

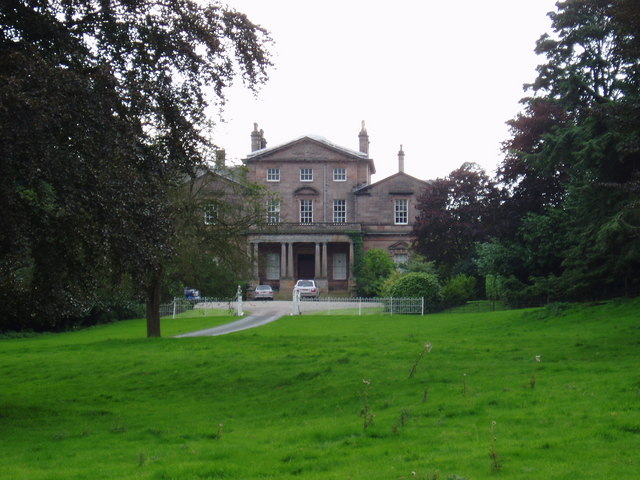
Stockeld Park, Yorkshire

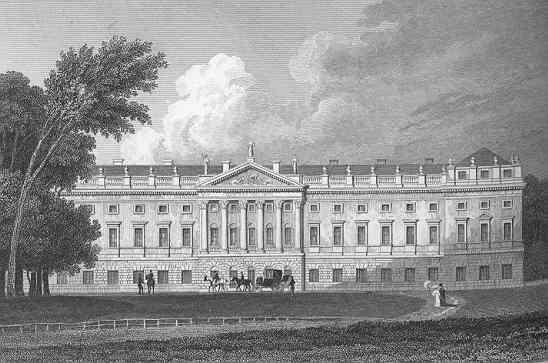
Worksop Manor, Nottinghamshire, demolished

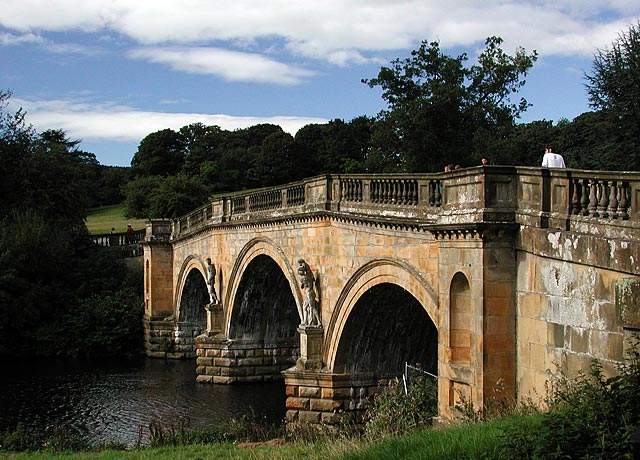
Bridge over the Derwent, in the Park, Chatsworth House, Derbyshire

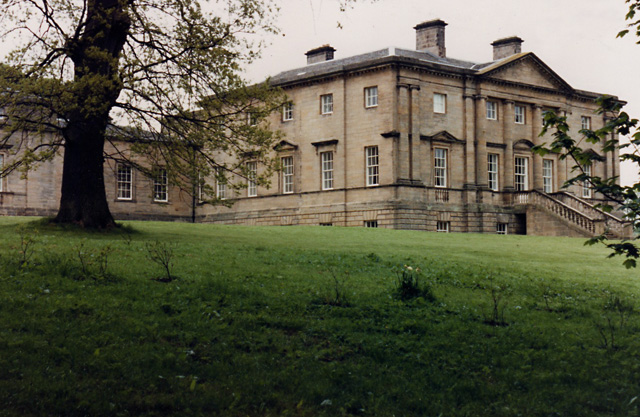
Belford Hall, Northumberland

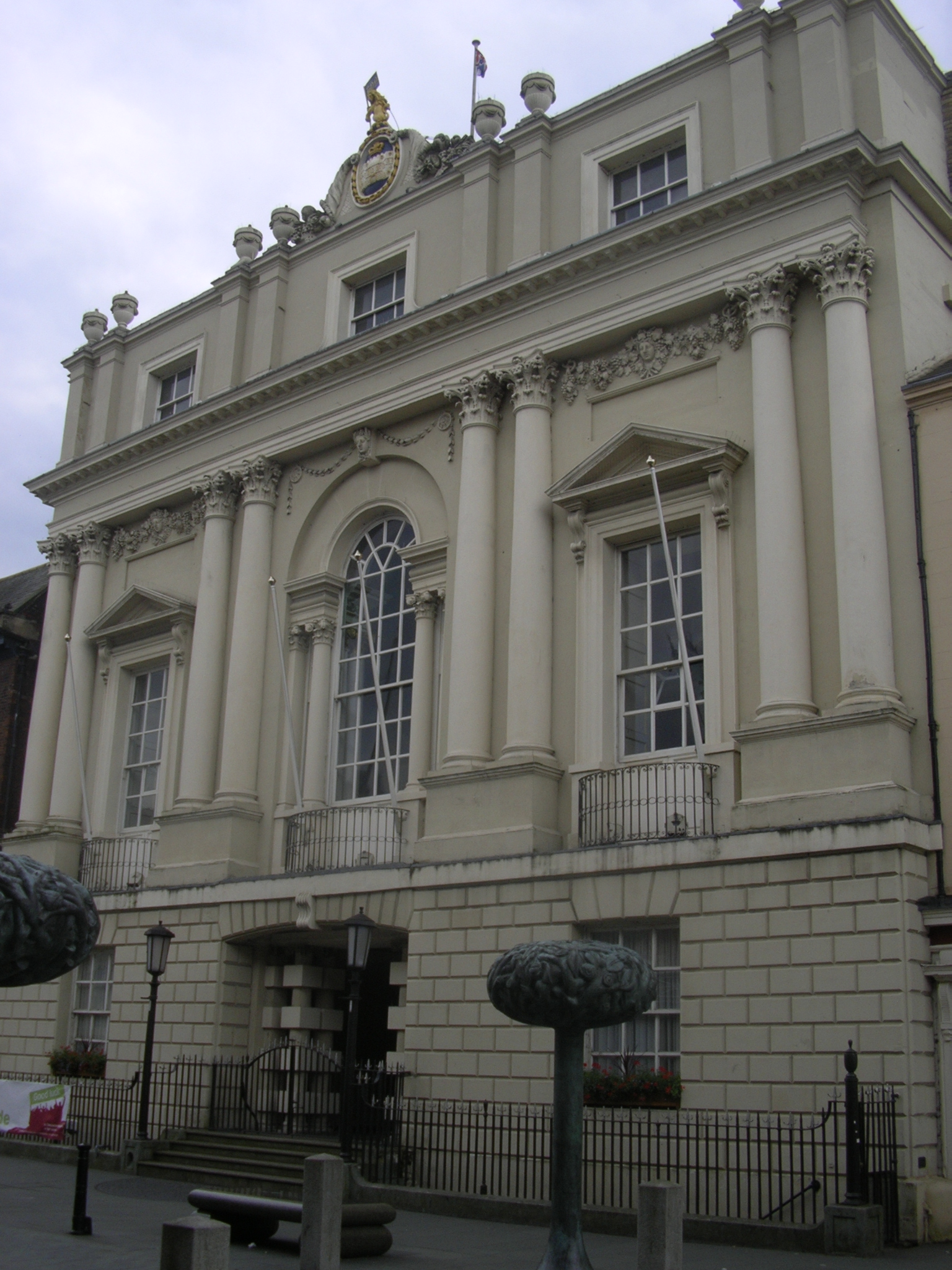
Mansion House, Doncaster, Yorkshire

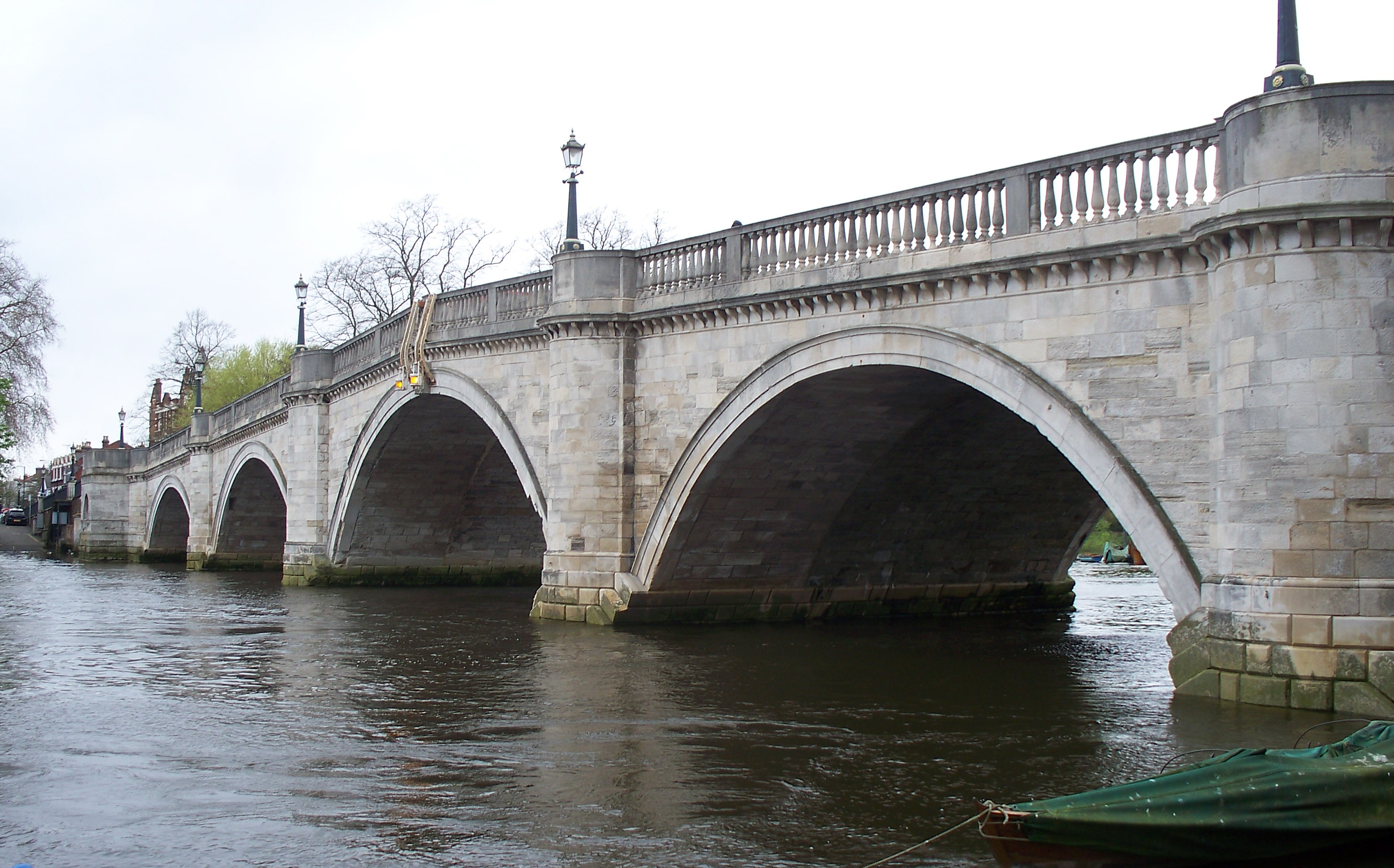
Richmond Bridge, Richmond, London
