= Sabine Winn =

British textile artist

Sabine Louise Winn (1734–1798) was a Swiss patron of the arts and a pioneering textile artist.

== Early life ==
She was born in Vevey in Switzerland on 25 March 1734 to Jacques Philippe d’Hervart (1706–1764), Baron de Saint-Légier and Governor of Vevey and his wife, Jeanne Esther Dunz (c.1707–1779). They were Huguenots. On 11 October 1754 she married her first husband, Gabriel May (1717–1759). After May's death, 4 December 1761, she married Rowland Winn (fifth baronet, 1739–1785). The couple lived at Nostell Priory in Yorkshire. A neighbour, Catherine Cappe, claimed that "the peace of the [Winn] family" was "entirely destroyed" by the return of the newlyweds to Yorkshire. Winn herself was very unhappy in Yorkshire, which she described as "one of the most desolate and gloomy corners of the universe".

== Nostell Priory ==
The couple commissioned Thomas Chippendale and Robert Adam to redesign the interior of Nostell Priory. The couple were painted by Hugh Douglas Hamilton in 1767.

During her time at Nostell, Winn engaged in textile art forms. She has been credited by historian Serena Dyer as an early crafter of dressed prints in Britain.

== Death ==
After the death of her husband, Winn remained as Nostell. By 1798 she had "so far lost the use of her limbs, as to be obliged to be lifted by two people in and out of bed". She died on 16 September 1798.
