= Nostell =

Village in West Yorkshire, England

Coordinates: 53.646°N 1.394°W

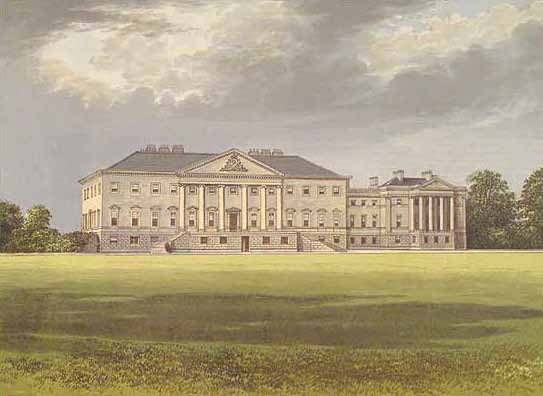
Nostell Priory by Morris (1880)

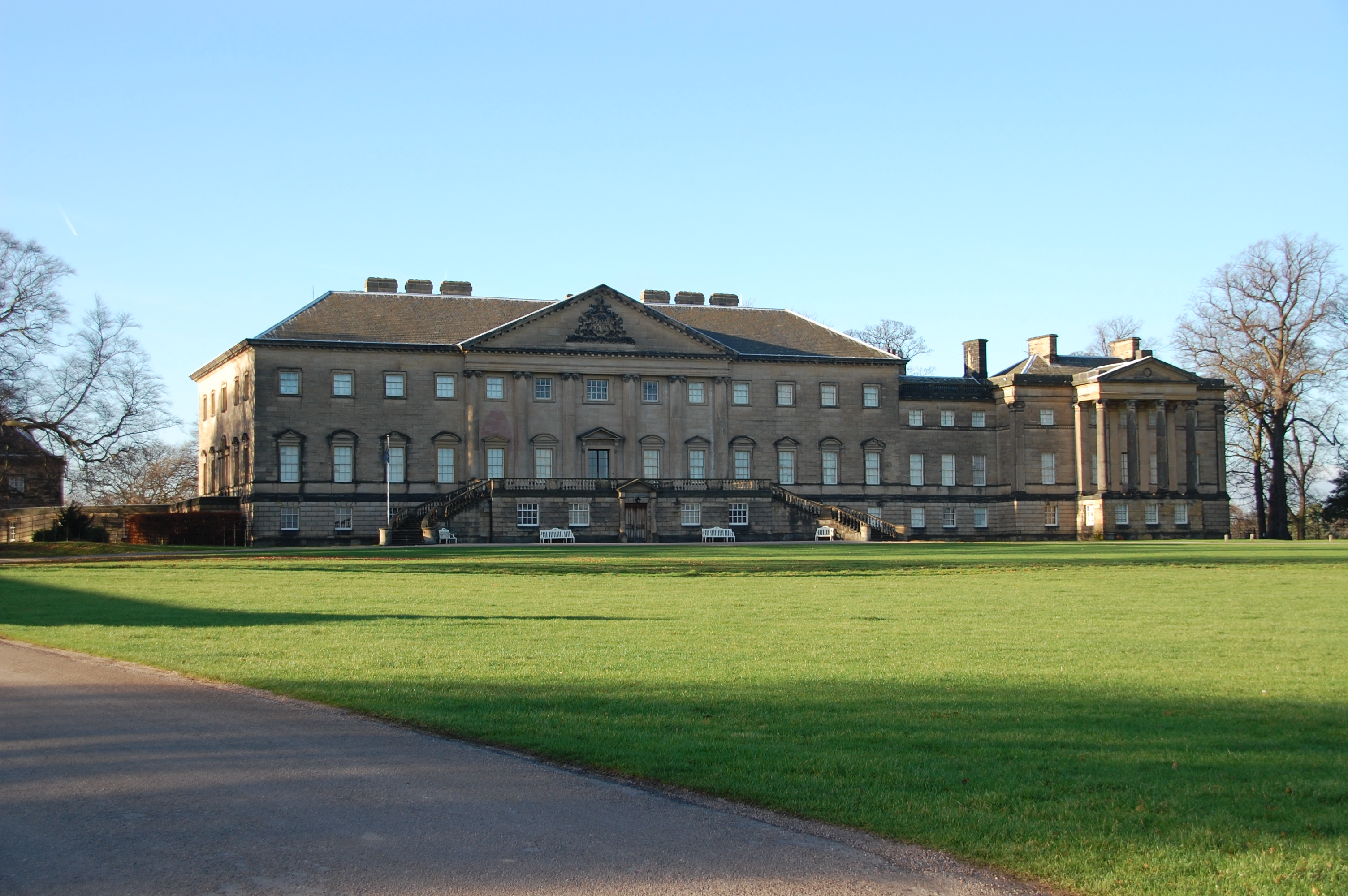
Nostell Priory in 2010

Nostell is an estate about 4 miles ESE of Wakefield the City of Wakefield in West Yorkshire, England. It is in the civil parish of Huntwick with Foulby and Nostell which had a population of 90 in 2001, and 164 at the 2011 census (including Wintersett).

The Nostell Estate was centred on Nostell Priory, an 18th-century Palladian historic house, on the site of an Augustinian priory which received its charter in 1121. The house has interiors by Robert Adam and furniture by Thomas Chippendale. The house was owned by the Winn family and is now in the care of the National Trust. Wragby Church is at the entrance to the grounds of Nostell Priory.

Coal mining on the Nostell Estate began in the 9th century and continued until 1987. Nostell Colliery was known locally as 'the family pit' due to the welfare schemes introduced by the Winn family far in advance of similar schemes before nationalisation. In 1880, terraced houses nicknamed "Cribbin's Lump" were built close to the colliery. They were renamed "New Crofton" by Lord St Oswald but the nickname remained until the houses were demolished in the 1980s. Nostell Colliery closed in 1987.

Nostell Cricket Club was established pre-1897 opposite the priory entrance.

In the 1870–1872 Imperial Gazetteer of England and Wales, "Foulby, Nostell and Huntwick" was described as an extra-parochial tract within Pontefract parish, with a population of 145 people in 27 houses.

== See also ==
- Listed buildings in Huntwick with Foulby and Nostell
