= Wragby, West Yorkshire =

Hamlet in West Yorkshire, England

Coordinates: 53.6488°N 1.3802°W

Wragby
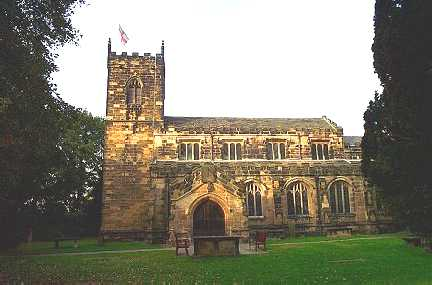
- Wragby parish church in 2001

- Location within West Yorkshire
- Civil parish: Hessle and Hill Top
- Metropolitan borough: Wakefield
- Metropolitan county: West Yorkshire
- Region: Yorkshire and the Humber
- Country: England
- Sovereign state: United Kingdom
- Police: West Yorkshire
- Fire: West Yorkshire
- Ambulance: Yorkshire

Wragby is a hamlet and former parish in the City of Wakefield district, West Yorkshire, England. It is in the civil parish of Hessle and Hill Top, although on the border of Huntwick with Foulby and Nostell. The village is on the A638 road from Wakefield to Doncaster, immediately east of the National Trust property of Nostell Priory. Wilson's 1870-1872 Imperial Gazetteer of England and Wales describes Wragby as a parish in Hemsworth district, with one village and five townships, and a population of 594 people in 192 houses, where "coal and building-stone are worked; and bricks, tiles, and pipes are made."

Wragby was part of the historic county of the West Riding of Yorkshire until April 1974. The village was also part of the ancient Wapentake of Staincross.

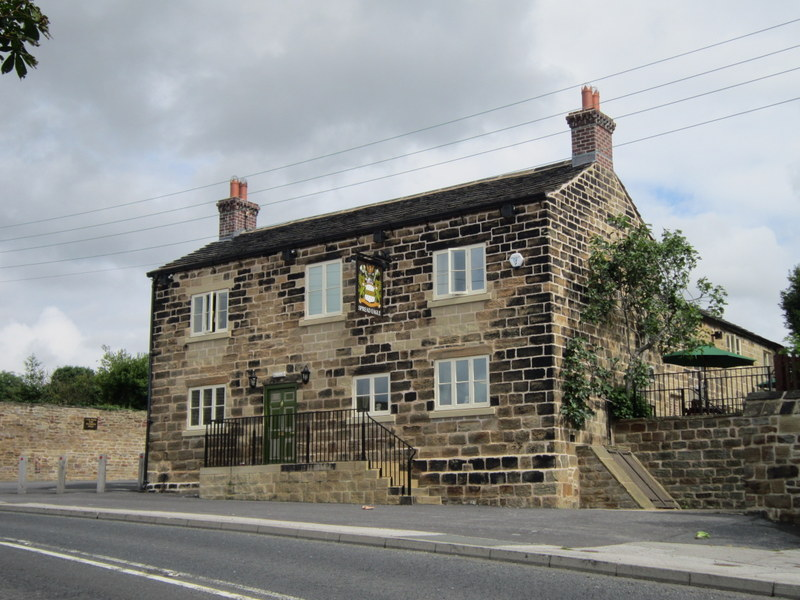
The Spread Eagle pub, Wragby, in 2012

Wragby's parish church, situated in the grounds of Nostell Priory and not in the village, is the grade I listed Church of St Michael and Our Lady. The church was built in the 1520s-1530s, and contains some earlier Romanesque fragments, and a collection of Swiss stained glass, dating from the early-16th to mid-18th centuries, which has been described as "second largest private collection of Swiss glass panels in the world". A weekly parish eucharist service is held, and the church is in use for weddings.

The village has, or had, a pub, the Spread Eagle, with records of landlords dating back to 1822 although the building may be older. As of 2024 it is reported to be "temporarily closed by the brewery".
