= Nostell Priory =

Historic house located in West Yorkshire, England

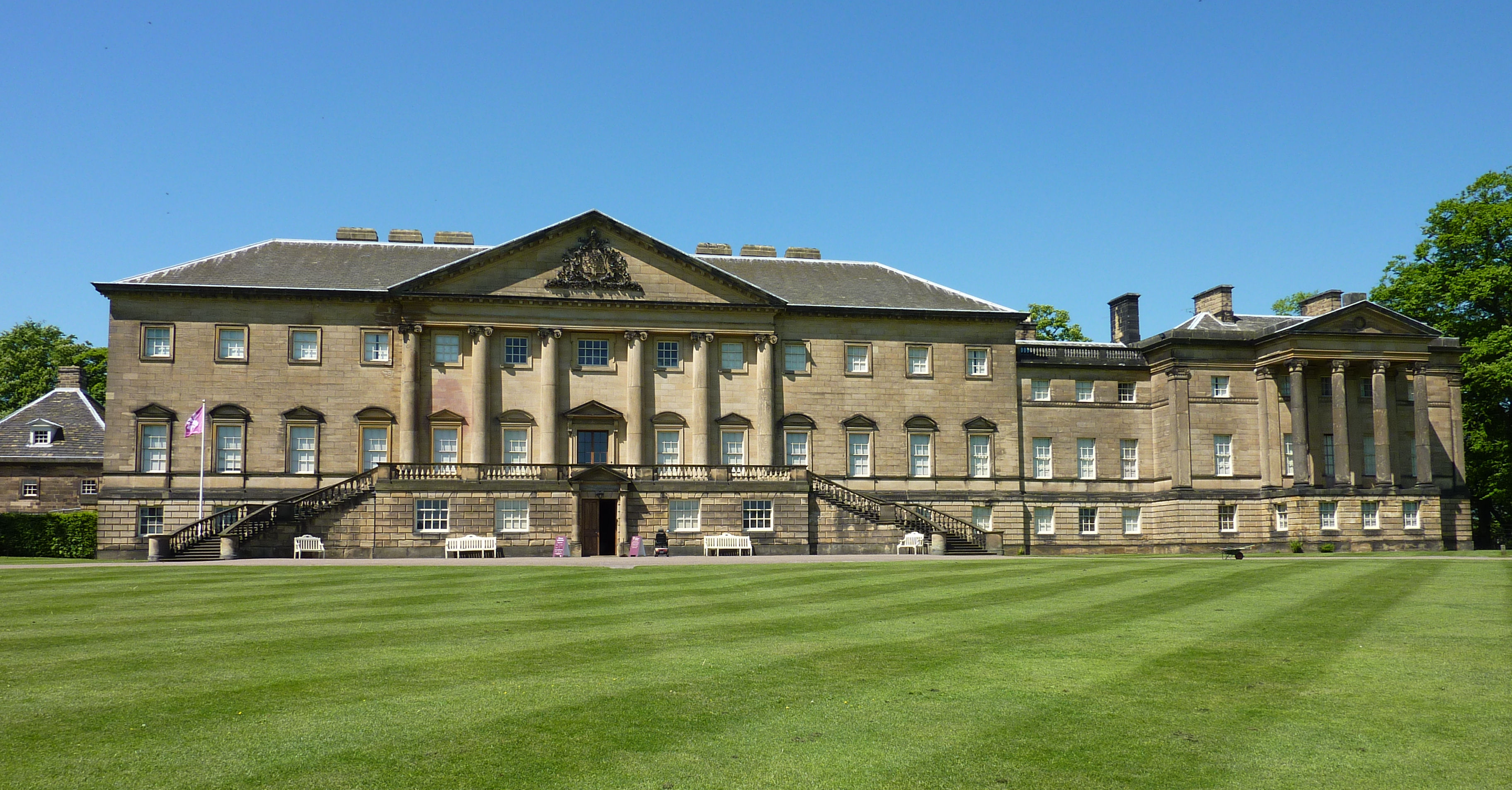
- Nostell Priory (front elevation)
- Interactive map of Nostell Priory
- 53.652706°N 1.390044°W

Site notes
- Area: 121 hectares (300 acres)
- Architect: James Paine
- Architectural style: Palladian

Listed Building – Grade I
- Reference no.: 1262071

Nostell Priory is a Palladian house in Nostell, West Yorkshire, in England, near Crofton and on the road to Doncaster from Wakefield. It dates from 1733 and was built for the Winn family on the site of a medieval priory. The Priory and its contents were given to the National Trust in 1953 by the trustees of the estate and Rowland Winn, 3rd Baron St Oswald.

== History ==
=== Monastic history ===
The priory was a 12th-century Augustinian foundation, dedicated to St Oswald, supported initially by Robert de Lacy of Pontefract and Thurstan of York. By about 1114, Aldulf, confessor to Henry I of England, was prior of a group of regular canons at Nostell. It is probable that Scone Abbey in Scotland was founded by monks from Nostell.

Sir John Field, the first Copernican astronomer of note in England, is believed to have studied at Nostell in his youth under the tutelage of Prior Alured Comwn.

As part of the Dissolution of the Monasteries, the priory was seized and depredated in 1540 and granted to Dr. Thomas Leigh. Nostell was purchased in 1567 by Sir Thomas Gargrave, a High Sheriff of Yorkshire, Speaker of the House of Commons and President of the Council of the North, from the 6th Baron Mountjoy for £3,560. In 1613 it was purchased by William Ireland who, in 1629, sold the estate to Sir John Wolstenholme, 1st Baronet, for £10,000. Nostell was then bought by the Winns from Wolstenholme after the Wolstenholme family were bankrupted by debts they incurred to provide finance for the Royalist cause.

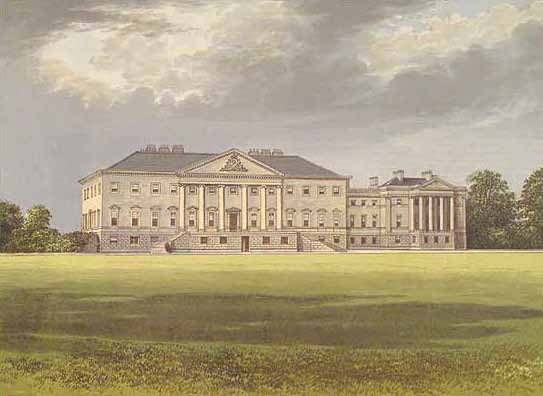
Nostell Priory in 1880

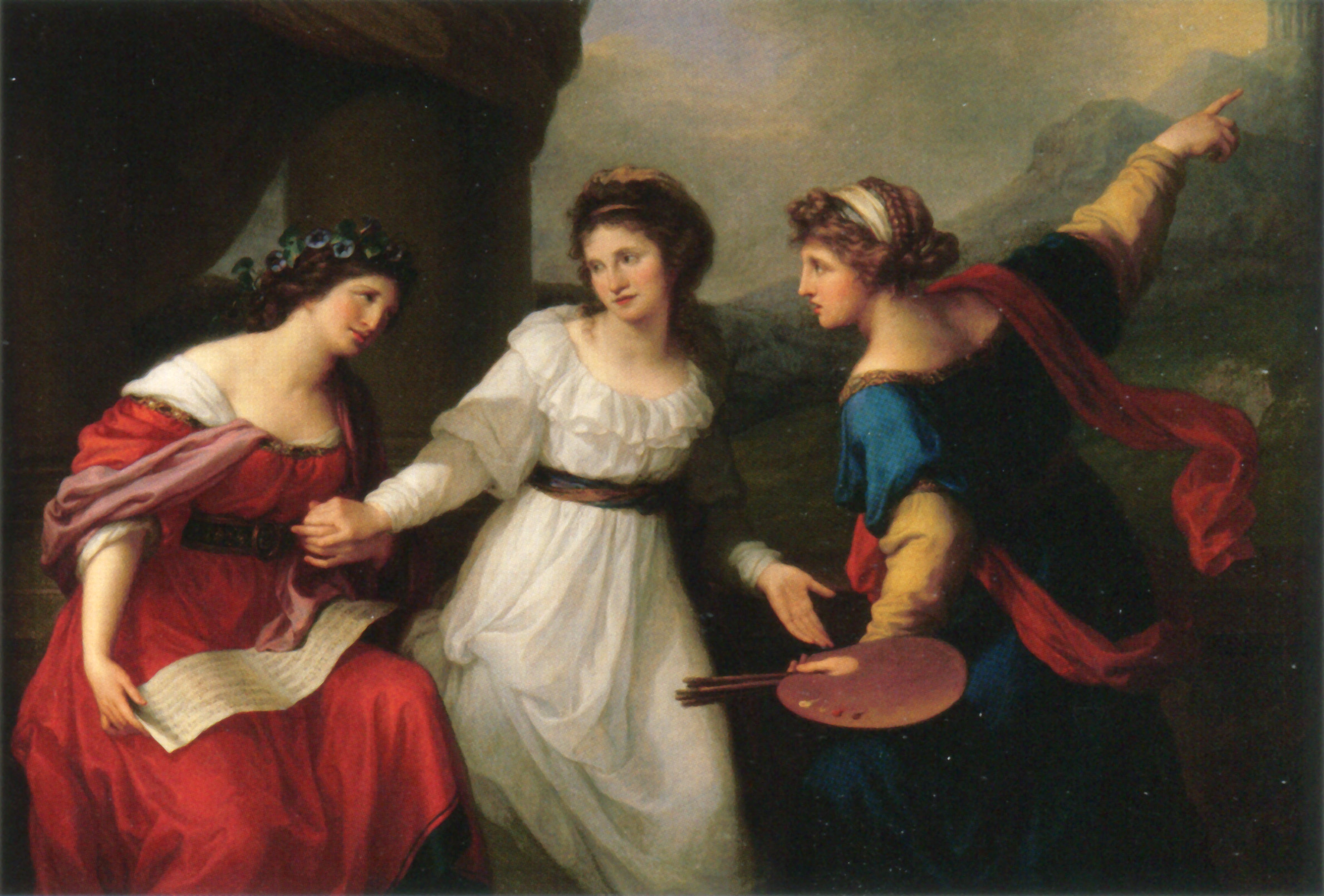
Self-portrait, Hesitating between the Arts of Music and Painting, by Angelica Kauffmann

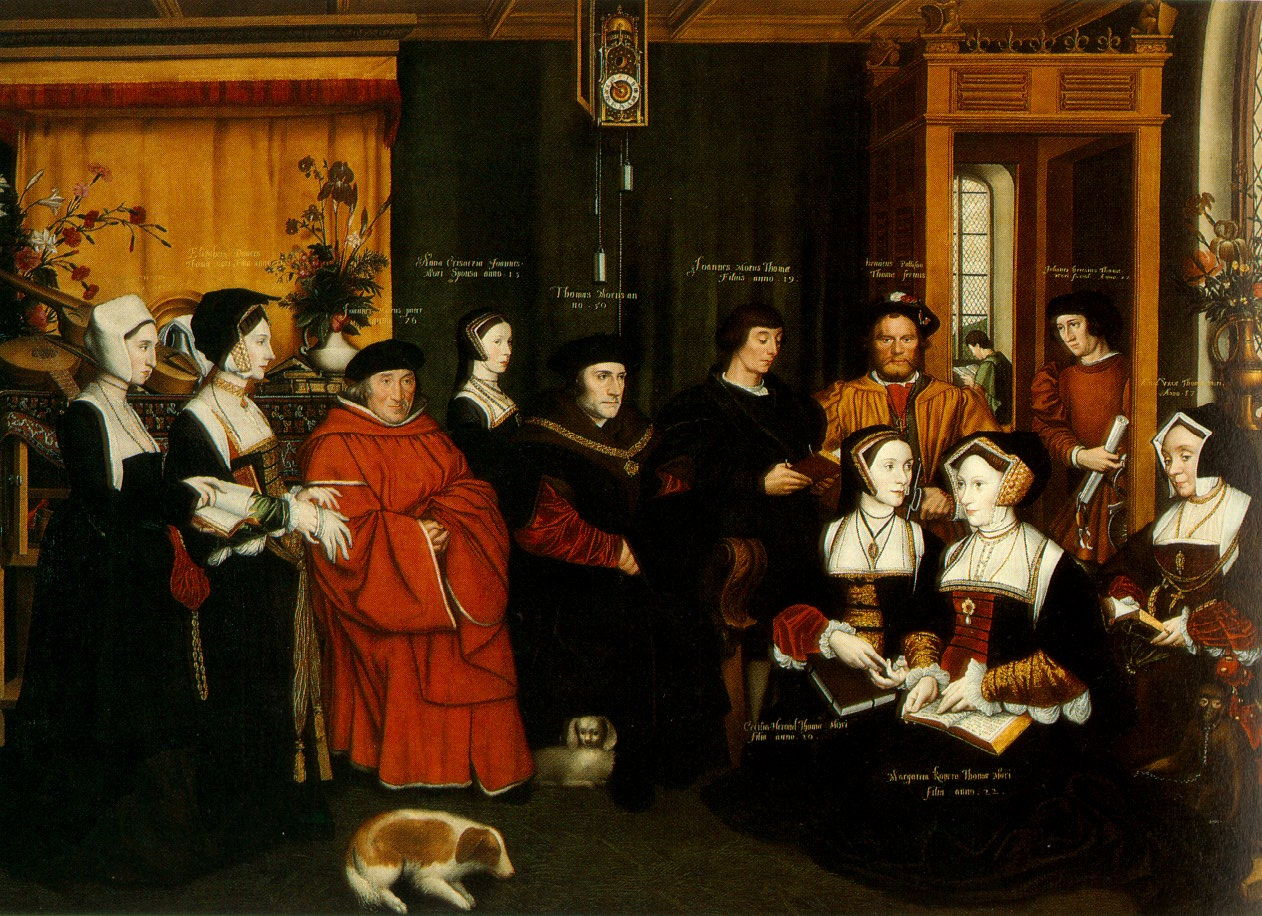
Rowland Lockey after Hans Holbein the Younger, Sir Thomas More and his Family (Nostell Priory version, 1592)

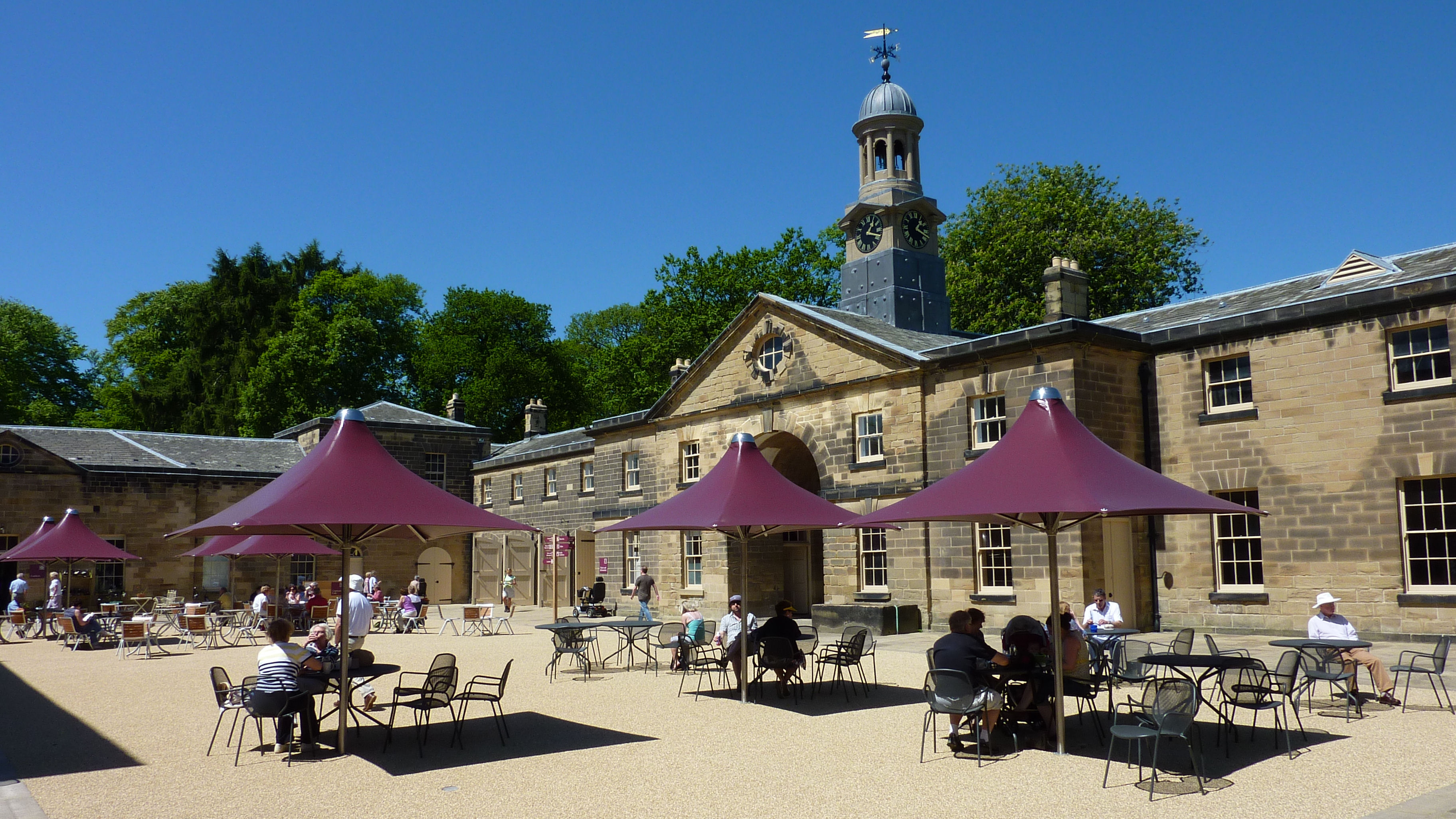
Stable block and courtyard

=== Later history ===
The estate was purchased in 1654 by the London alderman, Sir Rowland Winn, after its last owner, Sir John Wolstenholme, was declared bankrupt in 1650. Construction of the present house started in 1733 and the furniture, furnishings, and decorations made for the house remain in situ. The Winns were textile merchants in London; George Wynne of Gwydir was appointed as Draper to Elizabeth I, his grandson, Sir George Winn was created 1st Baronet of Nostell in 1660. In the nineteenth century the family prospered from the exploitation of coal under the Nostell estate, and later from leasing land at Scunthorpe in Lincolnshire after iron ore deposits were found by Rowland Winn, 1st Baron St Oswald, in 1858; Lord St Oswald later played an important role in the construction of the Trent, Ancholme and Grimsby Railway and the development of the Lincolnshire iron industry (from 1864) and steel industry (from 1891).

The house was built by James Paine for Sir Rowland Winn, 4th Bt., on the site of a 12th-century priory dedicated to Saint Oswald. Robert Adam was commissioned to design additional wings, only one of which was completed, and complete the staterooms. Adam added a double staircase to the front of the house, and designed buildings on the estate, including the stable block. Nostell Priory is home to a large collection of Chippendale furniture, all made for the house and commissioned by Sir Rowland Winn 5th Bart and his wife Sabine Winn. Thomas Chippendale was born in Otley in West Yorkshire in 1718 and had workshops in St Martin’s Lane, London. The Nostell Priory art collection includes The Procession to Calvary by Pieter Brueghel the Younger, William Hogarth's Scene from Shakespeare's The Tempest–the first depiction in a painting of any scene from Shakespeare's plays–and a self-portrait by Angelica Kauffman, as well as Rowland Lockey's copy of the painting by Hans Holbein (c. 1527 but now lost in a fire) of Sir Thomas More and Family; this copy was commissioned in 1592 by the More family and came to Nostell in the 18th century, and is said to be the most faithful to the destroyed original.

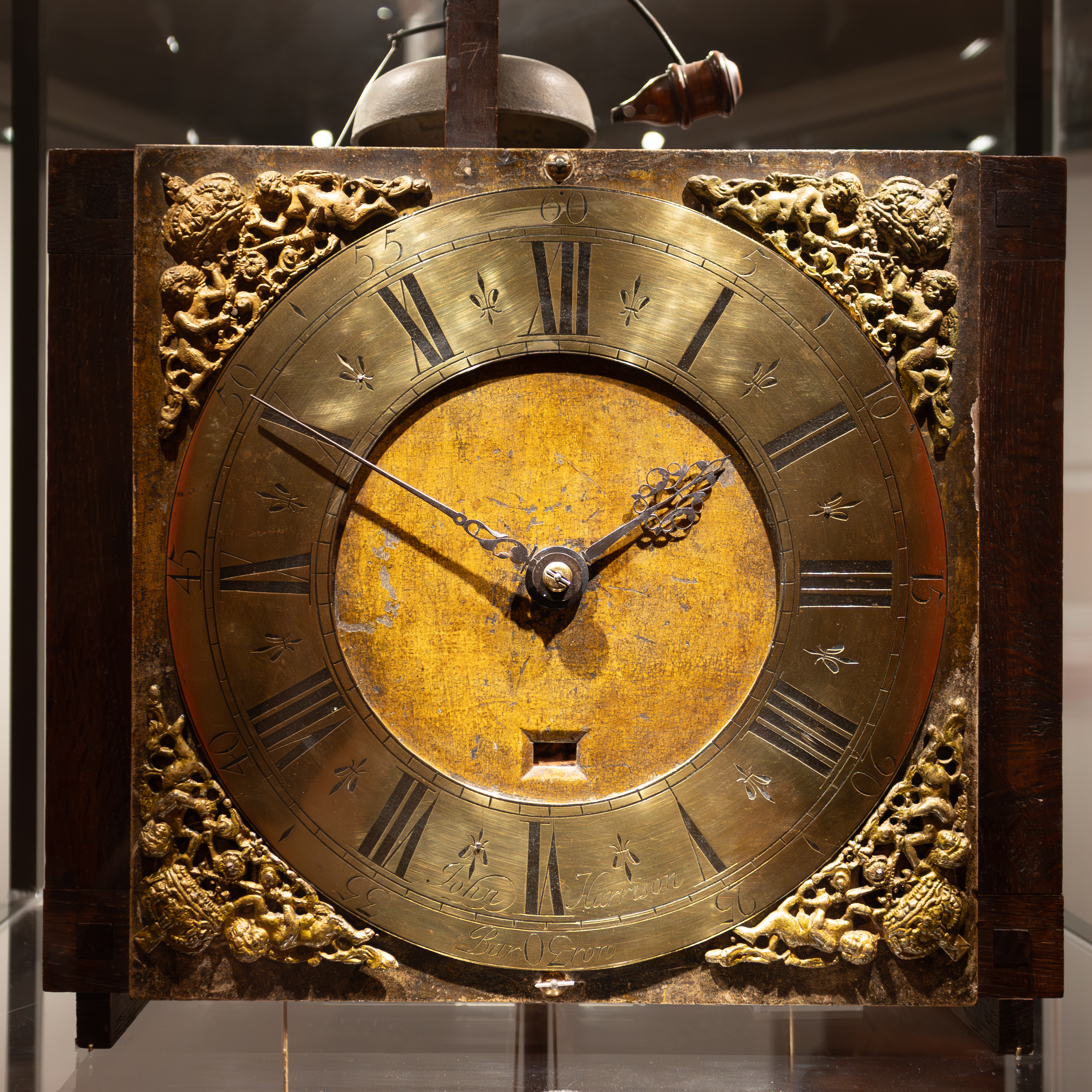
The John Harrison clock at Nostell Priory

A longcase clock, with an almost completely wooden internal mechanism, made by John Harrison in 1717, is housed in the billiard room. Harrison, whose father Henry is thought to have been an estate carpenter, was born within half a mile of the estate. He was referred to as John "Longitude" Harrison, after devoting his life to solving the problem of finding longitude at sea by creating an accurate marine timekeeper. Known as H4, this chronometer can be seen at the Royal Observatory, Greenwich in London.

In May 2007, a set of Gillows furniture returned to the house after refurbishment. These pieces furnish the tapestry room, as do a pair of large Venetian vases made of wood inlaid with ivory and semi-precious stones.

The Adam stable block has undergone a major renovation and is now open as a visitor centre for the house and parkland. In June 2009 a suite of bedrooms on the second floor was handed to the National Trust. The bedrooms used by the Winns, had never been on public view before. They contain the original contents, including a regency four-poster bed and suite of Victorian bedroom furniture. Another room open to visitors is the butler's pantry, with a display of Winn family silver, in the adjacent strongroom cabinets.

== Grounds ==
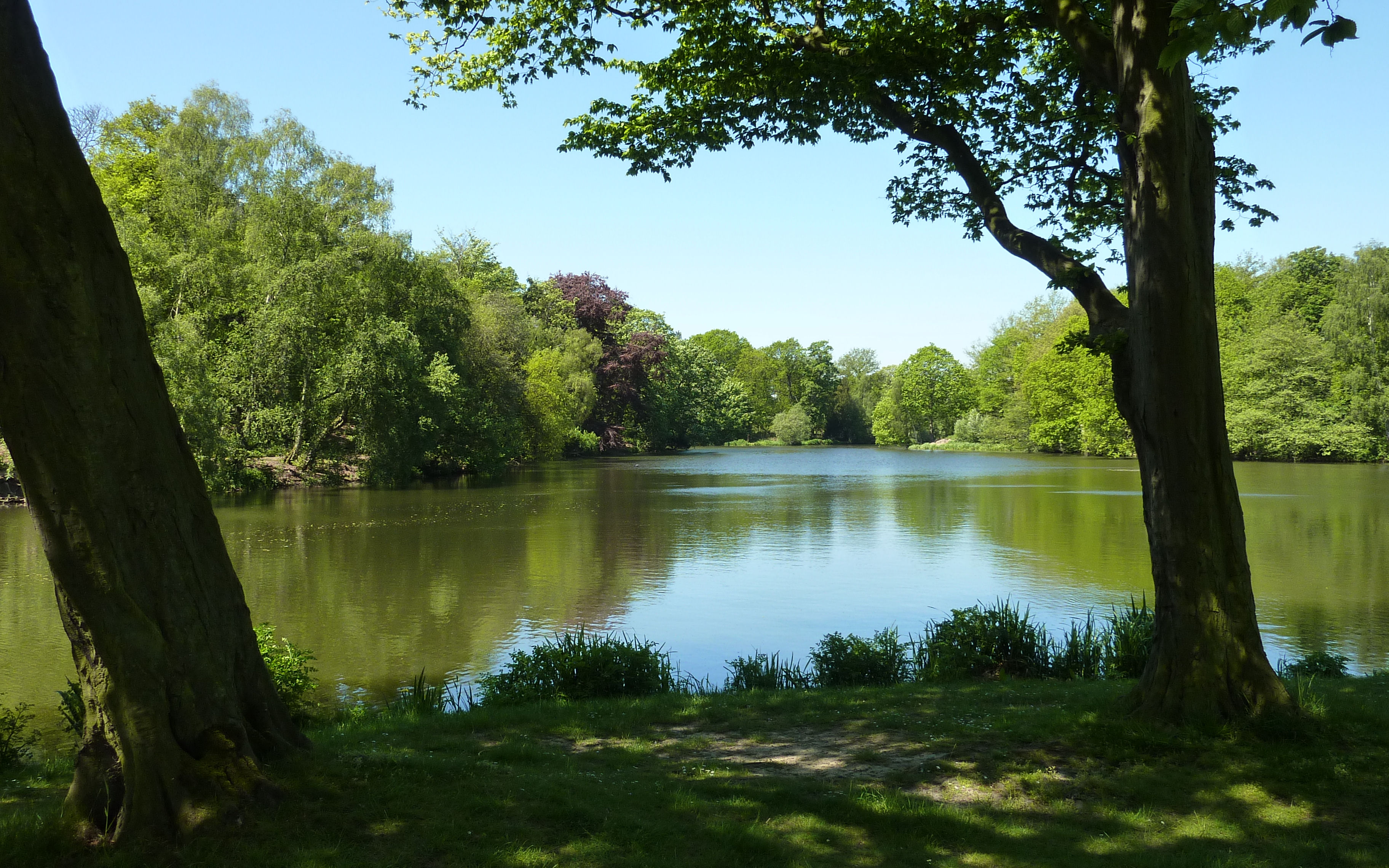
Lower Lake at Nostell Priory

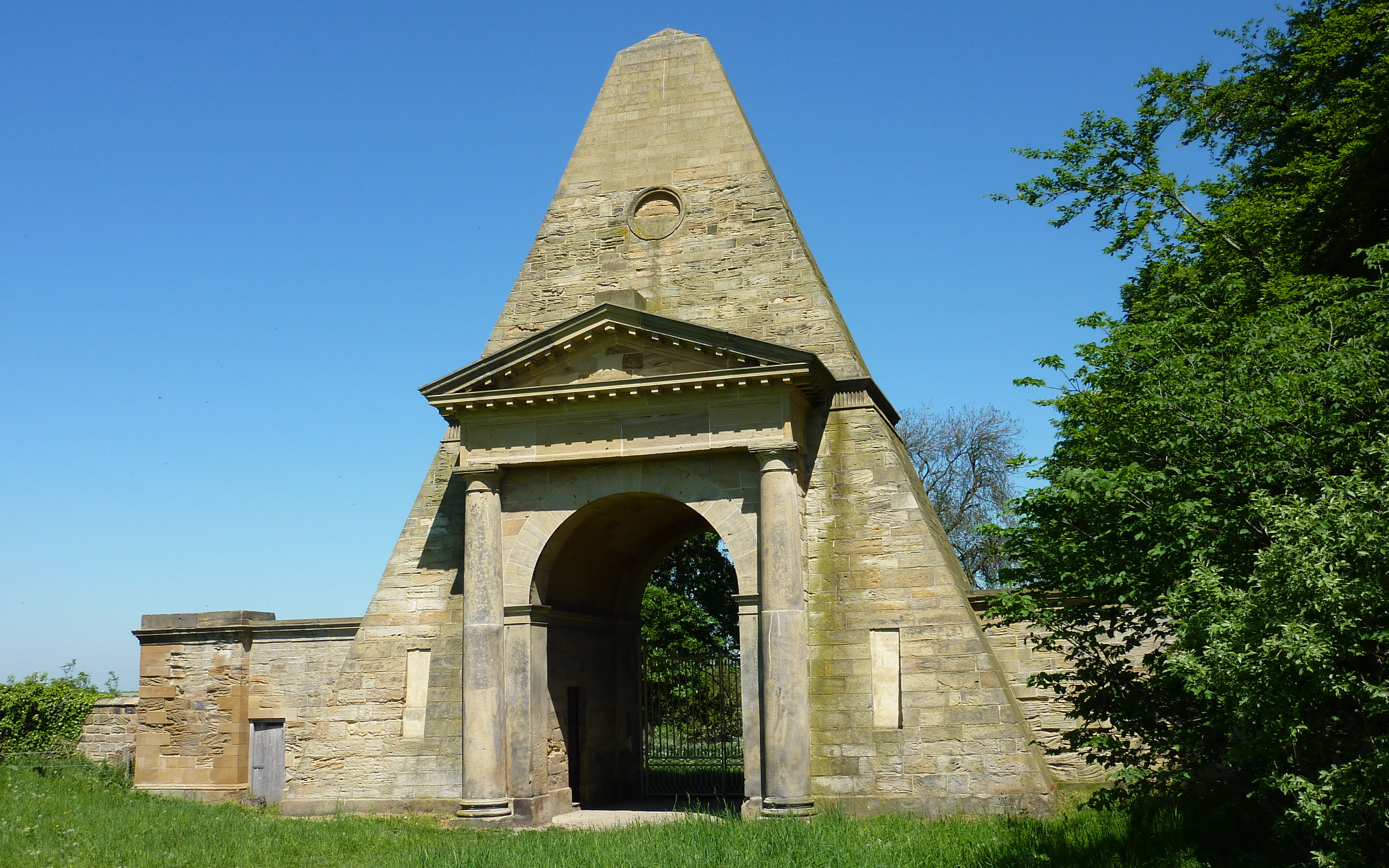
Obelisk Lodge at Nostell Priory

Nostell Priory occupies 121 hectares (300 acres) of parkland. Within the grounds and gardens are lakeside walks. The main façade of the house faces east towards a grass vista. Leading to the lake on the west side of the house is the west lawn. The parkland has lakeside and woodland walks, views of the druid's bridge and walks to the restored Obelisk Lodge, a parkland gatehouse, through wildflower meadows. The park was purchased from Lord St Oswald by the National Trust with funding from the Heritage Lottery fund. The grant enabled the trust to acquire pictures, books, and furniture from the family.

To the west of the Middle Lake lies the Menagerie Gardens, completed around 1760 along with a Gothic arch entrance. Built on the site of a medieval quarry, the Menagerie included a lioness, monkeys, bats and a cock pit, as well as a keeper's lodge and ice house. The Obelisk Lodge was built in the 17th century and inhabited until the late 1950s. The main lawn and the lower fields to the east of the Priory have been used for various large and small events over the years, however, it was "Central Yorkshire Scout County" in 2000 which provided a fundamental change to how the grounds could be used. The organisation chose Nostell Priory as the site for its year 2000 "Millennium Camp", which was to attract around 2,500 people from across the Yorkshire Scouting movement. During the 12-month preparation project to create temporary facilities and infrastructure, Yorkshire Water employee Jon Potter persuaded his employers to donate/install subterranean high-pressure water mains and stand-pipe points around the entire eastern grounds. This was unprecedented both in terms of a corporate donation and in its benefit to the Priory, which up to that point had been considering how they could self-fund exactly this improvement.

In August 1982 a music festival was held sponsored and organised by Theakston's Brewery. Two years later another commercial festival was organised by a different group of people. The "Convoy" was involved in organising a free festival next to it. Riot police were mobilised to deal with the free festival element who joined the event and many were arrested.

In 2012 the BBC reported that planning permission had been granted for an operating base for the Yorkshire Air Ambulance. The site, including a hangar and aircrew accommodation, was operational by summer 2013. It replaced the previous facility at Leeds Bradford Airport which is north of Leeds.

== See also ==
- Grade I listed buildings in West Yorkshire
- Listed buildings in Huntwick with Foulby and Nostell
