= Wadworth =

Village and civil parish in South Yorkshire, England

Coordinates: 53.4673°N 1.1442°W

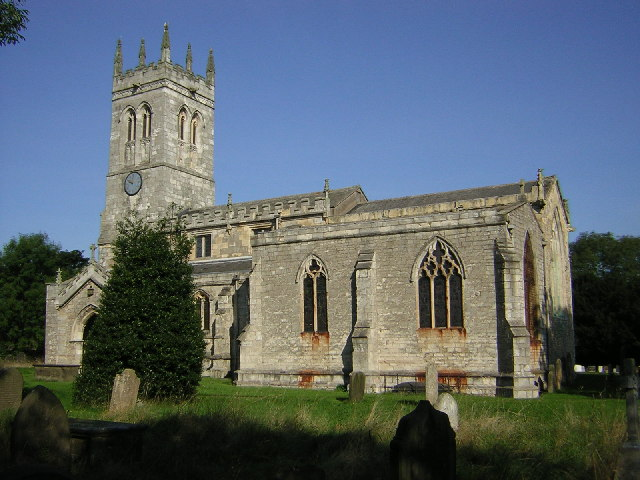
- Parish church of St John the Baptist

- Location within South Yorkshire
- Population: 1,137 (2011 Census)
- Civil parish: Wadworth
- Metropolitan borough: Doncaster
- Metropolitan county: South Yorkshire
- Region: Yorkshire and the Humber
- Country: England
- Sovereign state: United Kingdom
- Post town: DONCASTER
- Postcode district: DN11
- Dialling code: 01302
- Police: South Yorkshire
- Fire: South Yorkshire
- Ambulance: Yorkshire
- UK Parliament: Doncaster Central

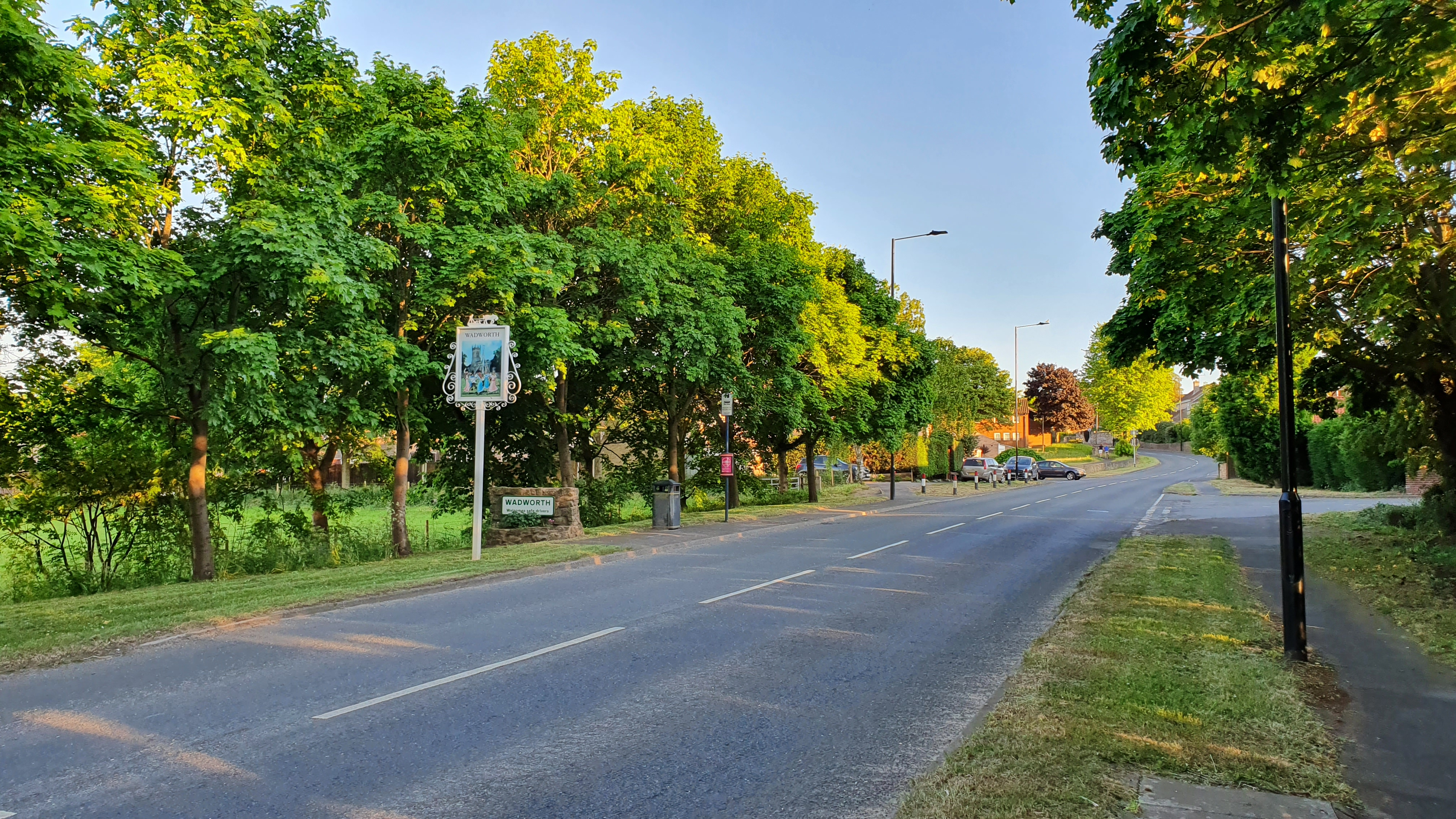
Entrance to Wadworth from the northern side, via the A60

Wadworth is a village and civil parish in the City of Doncaster in South Yorkshire, England.

== History ==
Notable buildings in the village include Wadworth Hall and the parish church of St John the Baptist.

The name Wadworth derives from the Old English Wadaworð meaning 'Wada's enclosure'.

== Geography ==
The parish had a population of 1,137 at the 2011 Census, a decrease from 1,229 at the 2001 Census.

=== Motorway ===
Wadworth interchange is junction 2 of the M18. The B6094, from the west, meets the A60 in the village.

Dowsett Engineering Construction were given the £159,958 contract for the Wadworth interchange contract, in July 1965, before the M18 contract was given. Construction of the interchange started in August 1965, months before the M18 contract was given at the end of January 1966. The interchange would take 14 months to build.

Construction of the M18 started in February 1966. W. & C. French built 8.5 miles of the M18 in December 1967 for £5,080,309.

There was a later plan in 1975 to have access to Loversall on the A60, at the Wadworth interchange, but this was removed in a redesign in May 1976.

The seven-mile section of motorway from Wadworth to Armthorpe was opened from the A60 motorway bridge on December 15 1978, built by Dowsett Engineering Construction.

== See also ==
- Listed buildings in Wadworth
- Wadworth Brewery, of Wiltshire, known for 6X beer

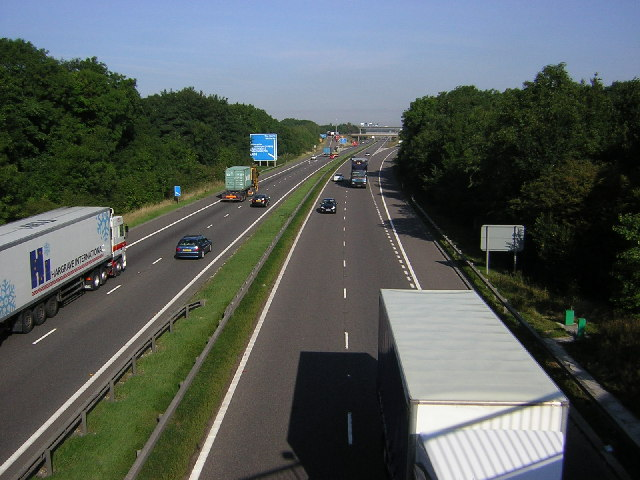
Wadworth interchange in September 2005
