= Kenneth Hargreaves =

British Army officer (1903–1990)

Brigadier Kenneth Hargreaves CBE TD DL (23 February 1903 – 27 March 1990) was a British soldier and industrialist who held several local offices in Yorkshire.

He was commissioned into the Leeds Rifles, a Territorial Army battalion of the West Yorkshire Regiment, in 1922 but later transferred to the Royal Artillery when the Leeds Rifles became 66th Anti-Aircraft Regiment, RA. He was appointed Commander of the Order of the British Empire (CBE) in 1956.

He married Else Markenstam (d. 1968) in 1958, and adopted his stepchildren by that marriage, Ingrid Mary and Peter Hargreaves-Allen. He subsequently married Hon. Margaret Lane-Fox, the daughter of George Lane-Fox, 1st Baron Bingley, on 15 February 1969.

Hargreaves served as High Sheriff of Yorkshire in 1962, Lord Lieutenant of the West Riding of Yorkshire from 1970 until 1974, when, as a result of the reorganization of county governments, he became Lord Lieutenant of West Yorkshire until 1978. He was appointed a Deputy Lieutenant of West Yorkshire on 4 May 1978.

Honorary titles
Preceded by Sir Richard Graham, Bt	High Sheriff of Yorkshire; 1962–1963	Succeeded by Kenneth Wade Parkinson
Preceded by Brigadier Noel Tetley	Honorary Colonel of the Leeds Rifles; 1963–1966	Succeeded by John Houston Taylor
Preceded by The Earl of Scarbrough	Lord Lieutenant of the West Riding of Yorkshire; 1970–1974	Office abolished
Preceded by Office created	Lord Lieutenant of West Yorkshire; 1974–1978	Succeeded by William Bulmer
