= William Bulmer (businessman) =

English businessman (1920–2012)

Sir William Bulmer KStJ ERD DL
- Born: 20 May 1920; Cullingworth, West Yorkshire, England
- Died: 28 November 2012 (aged 92)
- Education: Bradford Grammar School; Wrekin College
- Occupation: Businessman
- Parents: William Bulmer (father); Florence Buller (mother)
- Military career
- Allegiance: United Kingdom
- Branch: British Army
- Service years: 1939-1996
- Rank: Captain
- Unit: Royal Regiment of Artillery
- Conflicts: World War II

Sir William Peter Bulmer KStJ ERD DL (20 May 1920 – 28 November 2012) was Lord Lieutenant of West Yorkshire from 1978 to 1985. Having escaped from a POW camp during World War II he went on to become managing director of the family business, Bulmer & Lumb, between 1963 and 1985. He has been described as 'a leading figure in the textile industry'.

== Early life ==
Bulmer was born on in Cullingworth near Bradford, the son of William and Florence Buller. He was educated at Bradford Grammar School, a private school in Frizinghall, Bradford, and Wrekin College, a public school in Wellington, Shropshire. While at Wrekin College, he reached the rank of Cadet Company Quartermaster Sergeant in the school's Officer Training Corps. He then attended Bradford Technical College on a two-year course in textile subjects.

== Military service ==
On 10 June 1939, Bulmer was commissioned as a second lieutenant into the Royal Regiment of Artillery's supplementary reserve of officers. He transferred to the Regular Army Reserve of Officers on 10 June 1949 in the rank of captain.

== Honours and decorations ==
On 15 December 1942, it was noted in the London Gazette that Bulmer had been Mentioned in Despatches 'in recognition of gallant and distinguished services in the Middle East during the period November, 1941, to April, 1942'. On 3 August 1944, it was noted in The London Gazette that Bulmer had been further Mentioned in Despatches 'in recognition of gallant and distinguished services in the field'. He was awarded the Army Emergency Reserve Decoration (ERD) in 1996.

It was announced in the 1974 Queen's Birthday Honours, that he was to be honoured as a Knight Bachelor 'for services to export'. On 17 July 1974, he was knighted by Queen Elizabeth II at Buckingham Palace. In December 1978, he was appointed Knight of the Venerable Order of Saint John (KStJ).

On 26 March 1974, he was appointed High Sheriff of West Yorkshire for a year. On 30 September 1977, he was appointed Deputy Lieutenant for the West Yorkshire. On 5 April 1978, he was appointed Lord Lieutenant of West Yorkshire.

Honorary titles
Preceded by Kenneth Hargreaves	Lord Lieutenant of West Yorkshire; 1978–1985	Succeeded by John Taylor, Baron Ingrow
