= John Taylor, Baron Ingrow =

British politician (1917–2002)

The Right Honourable The Lord Ingrow OBE TD DL
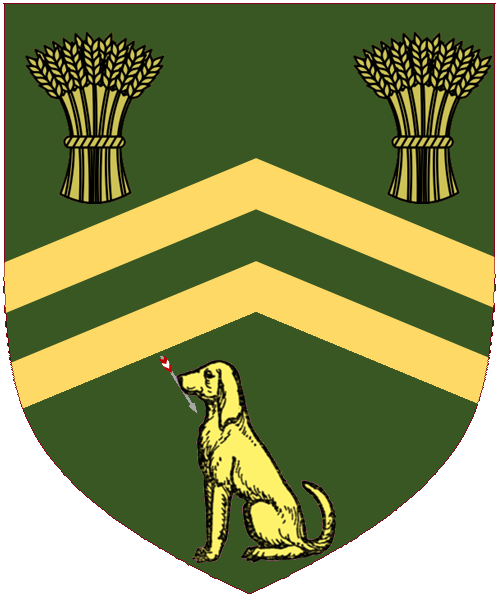
- The arms of Lord Ingrow

Member of the House of Lords
- Lord Temporal
- Life peerage 31 January 1983 – 7 February 2002

Personal details
- Born: 15 August 1917
- Died: 7 February 2002 (aged 84)

Coat of arms of John Taylor, Baron Ingrow

Crest
A demi-talbot Or holding in the mouth an arrow in bend the head downwards Proper.
Escutcheon
Vert two chevronels between in chief as many garbs of barley and in base a talbot sejant Or holding in the mouth an arrow in bend the head downwards Proper.
Supporters
Dexter, a shire horse Argent harnessed and bridled Proper; Sinister, a lion Or head and mane Gules gorged with a chaplet of roses Argent barbed and seeded Proper.
Compartment
A grassy mount growing therefrom on each side a rose Argent barbed, seeded and leaved Proper between two sprigs of oak fructed also Proper.
Motto
Semper Fidelis

John Aked Taylor, Baron Ingrow OBE TD DL (15 August 1917 – 7 February 2002) was a British soldier, brewer and Conservative politician.

Born to Percy and Gladys Taylor, he was educated at Shrewsbury School. During World War II Taylor served in the Duke of Wellington's Regiment and subsequently with the Royal Signals with whom he carried out decoding work in Norway, the Middle East, north Africa, Italy, north-west Europe, and Burma and was decorated with the Territorial Decoration (TD) in 1951.

Taylor was for 40 years chairman and managing director of Timothy Taylor & Co, the family brewery in Keighley, West Yorkshire founded by his grandfather Timothy Taylor in 1858.

Taylor was a member of Keighley Town Council for 21 years from 1946, serving as mayor in 1956. For nearly 20 years (1964–83) Taylor was a member of the executive committee of the National Union of Conservative and Unionist Associations; for five years (1971–76) he served as its chairman.

In 1960, Taylor was made an Officer of the Order of the British Empire (OBE). He was knighted in 1972 and created a life peer as Baron Ingrow, of Keighley in the County of West Yorkshire on 31 January 1983. From 1985 to 1992 he was Lord Lieutenant of West Yorkshire, having been a Deputy Lieutenant before.

Lord Ingrow was married to Barbara Stirk from 1949 until her death in 1997. They had two daughters.

Honorary titles
| Preceded by William Bulmer | Lord Lieutenant of West Yorkshire; 1985–1992 | Succeeded by John Lyles |
