= Dictionary of British Sculptors 1660–1851 =

- Author: Rupert Gunnis
- Publication date: 1953

The Dictionary of British Sculptors 1660–1851 is a biographical dictionary of sculptors active in Britain in the period between the Restoration of Charles II and the Great Exhibition of 1851. It has appeared in three editions, published in 1953, 1968, and 2009 respectively: the 2009 edition adopts the amended title A Biographical Dictionary of Sculptors in Britain 1660–1851. The first two editions were researched and written by Rupert Forbes Gunnis, and were often known simply as Gunnis. The third edition was edited by Ingrid Roscoe. The book is a major scholarly work, which rapidly established itself as a standard authority on British sculptors and sculpture.

== First edition ==
The Dictionary was conceived and written by Rupert Forbes Gunnis (1899–1965), a civil servant in the British colonial Government of Cyprus, and later curator of Tunbridge Wells Museum. He originally hoped to write "a complete dictionary of British sculpture from the earliest times until the close of the last [the 19th] century", but realised that he needed to confine himself to a more manageable period. The finished volume nonetheless contained over 1,700 biographies, with lists of the artists' works. In addition to a considerable amount of archival research, Gunnis personally visited over 6,000 churches in Britain (and others in Ireland), and saw the great majority of the works mentioned in the book. The volume was completed in 1951 (the date of the preface), and published by Odhams Press in 1953 (Harvard University Press 1954).

== Second edition ==
Gunnis also edited the revised second edition, published by the Abbey Library in 1968. Revisions included the correction of errors, and the addition of some new material. Gunnis admitted, however, that he had been unable to add all the new information that he had accumulated in an additional thirteen years of research, "for had I done so the book would have been more than twice its original size".

== Third edition ==
Under the auspices of the Henry Moore Institute and the University of Leeds, work began in 2000 on revising the dictionary for a new edition, overseen by Ingrid Roscoe, with the assistance of co-editors Emma Hardy, a curator at the Geffrye Museum, and Greg Sullivan, curator of British Art 1750–1830 at Tate Britain. The Dictionary was published by Yale University Press in 2009 under the slightly amended title A Biographical Dictionary of Sculptors in Britain 1660–1851.

The third edition is considerably enlarged: it contains 3,125 entries and runs to 1,620 pages (as compared to 514 pages for the second edition). It covers sculptors who were active in Britain at any time between 1660 and 1851, irrespective of their country of origin and even if they also worked outside these dates. All the artists listed in the Gunnis Dictionary remain, but new ones have been added, reflecting later research on the subject. The book's format is closely based on the original, each entry consisting of a biographical text followed by a list of works. There is also a comprehensive general bibliography. Unlike Gunnis's editions, which included up to thirty illustrations, the new edition is unillustrated.

=== Reception ===
The third edition was widely welcomed and recommended as a key starting point for research into this area of art. The view of the professional body for art historians in Britain, the Association of Art Historians, was expressed by Rosa Somerville writing in the Association's journal, The Art Book, in 2010 where she stated that the new dictionary "is a great advance on the work ... that was begun so enthusiastically and extensively by Rupert Gunnis". Somerville added that the new dictionary is "a handsome and scholarly reference book detailing British sculptors between the Restoration and the Great Exhibition". John Kenworthy-Browne, writing in Apollo magazine, said: "This magnificent dictionary of British sculptors supersedes Rupert Gunnis's standard work simply by the sheer volume of information that it presents." Similarly in The Art Newspaper, Oliver Garnett of the National Trust wrote: "The result is breathtaking: 1,000 additional biographies, followed by work lists covering 35,000 individual pieces, tied to a bibliography of 3,000 items which will be immensely useful in its own right." Similar praise came from Simon Watney, writing in The Burlington Magazine, who said of the work that went into the new dictionary: "The result is a book of unrivalled authority, which employs a pleasurably straightforward format of biographies followed in each case by chronological sequences of religious and then secular works." A more qualified review came from Jean Wilson of the Church Monuments Society who, while allowing that the book "improves tremendously on its predecessor, that its coverage is enormously increased, and that it is enlightening", uncovered a number of "exasperating problems" of error and inconsistency in the book's indexes, and suggested that these do not reach the "high standards set by the editors" elsewhere in the volume.

== Online edition ==
The contents of the third edition were published online as a fully searchable database in 2012, hosted by the Henry Moore Foundation. The contents are regularly updated with the benefits of new research, including new biographical entries, new biographical details and attributed works within existing entries, and an expanded bibliography.

== Complementary dictionaries ==
The Dictionary is complemented for the preceding century by the "Biographical Dictionary of London Tomb Sculptors, c.1560–c.1660" by Adam White, published by the Walpole Society in 1999 (and supplemented by a list of corrigenda and addenda published in 2009). Although White's Dictionary may appear from its title to be narrower in scope than Gunnis's, in practice, given that most active sculptors in this period included tomb monuments among their work, and that London overwhelmingly dominated the trade, the two dictionaries in fact cover very similar ground.

For Ireland, the Dictionary is complemented by the biographical entries for sculptors active from 1600 to modern times which occupy the greater part of Sculpture, 1600–2000, volume 3 of the five-volume Art and Architecture of Ireland, published by the Royal Irish Academy in 2014.
