= Adeeba Malik =

British-Pakistani executive (born 1966)

Adeeba Malik CBE DL

Lord Lieutenant of West Yorkshire
- Incumbent
- Assumed office September 2025
- Monarch: Charles III
- Preceded by: Edmund Anderson

Deputy Lieutenant of West Yorkshire
- In office April 2022 – September 2025

Personal details
- Born: 30 September 1966 (age 60) Bradford
- Education: University of Hull (BEd)

Adeeba Malik CBE DL (born 30 September 1966) is a British-Pakistani teacher, executive, and trustee. As of 22 December 2025, Malik serves as Lord Lieutenant of West Yorkshire.

== Early life and education ==
Adeeba Malik was born on 30 September 1966 in Bradford to a British Pakistani family. Her father, Mohammed Sadiq Malik, had moved to Bradford from Pakistan in 1958. In 1965 he had returned to Sialkot where he met Fahmeeda. The two were married and, in 1966 moved to Bradford. In a 2022 interview to celebrate International Women's Day, Adeeba noted that in 1967 her mother, Fahmeeda, was one of only 67 south-asian women in her community in Bradford numbering over 3,000. Adeeba attended The Grange school in Bradford and studied for a Bachelor's Degree and then a Master's Degree in education at the University of Hull.

== Career ==
In 1992, Malik joined the QED Foundation, a Bradford-based charity which works to eradicate poverty, disadvantage and discrimination amongst disadvantaged communities. She is currently its Deputy Chief Executive. She has worked with many different social projects, including the Waterways Trust, The National Muslim Women's Advisory Board, and is a former governor of Sheffield Hallam University. Through her position with Bradford Culture Company Ltd she has supported Bradford’s bid to host the UK City of Culture title in 2025. She is Member of the Honours Committee in the Community and Voluntary Services committee. On 1 November 2021 she was appointed as a trustee of York Museums Trust. She is also a trustee of Carers Resource, and Poverty Alleviation Scholarships.

Malik was appointed a Member of the Most Excellent Order of the British Empire (MBE) in the 2004 Birthday Honours for services to community relations and to business in Bradford; in the 2015 New Year Honours she was promoted to Commander of the Order of the British Empire (CBE) for services to interfaith and community cohesion.

She was appointed a Deputy Lieutenant (DL) of West Yorkshire in April 2022. In September 2025, Malik was appointed the new Lord Lieutenant of West Yorkshire, becoming the first woman of Asian heritage to become a Lord-lieutenant anywhere in the country.
