= Stylloi =

Stylloi: Στύλλοι (Greek); Mutluyaka (Turkish)
- Village
- Location in Cyprus
- Coordinates: 35°10′17″N 33°50′1″E
- Country (de jure): Cyprus
  - District: Famagusta District
- Country (de facto): Northern Cyprus
  - District: Gazimağusa District
- Time zone: UTC+2 (EET)
  - Summer (DST): UTC+3 (EEST)

Stylloi (Greek: Στύλλοι; Turkish: Mutluyaka) is a village in the Famagusta District of Cyprus, located 12 km northwest of Famagusta. It is under the de facto control of Northern Cyprus.

== Archaeological Excavations ==
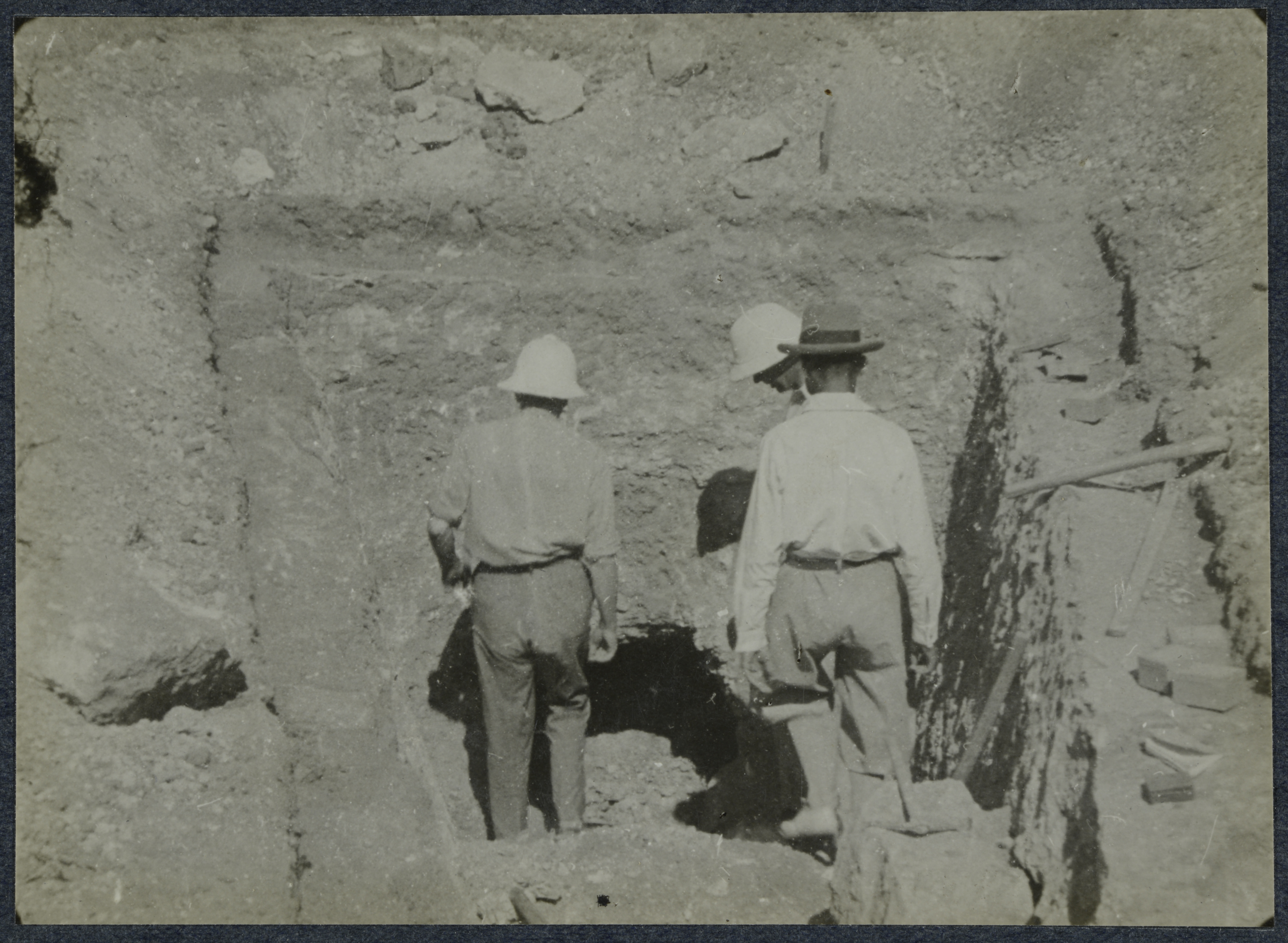
This picture probably depicts the Crown Prince of Sweden, Gustaf Adolf VI, at the excavation of Stylli in Cyprus.

Close to the modern village of Stylloi the Swedish Cyprus Expedition, led by Einar Gjerstad, excavated a necropolis. The site was known before and Mr. Rubert Gunnis, inspector of Antiquities in Cyprus, excavated here in 1928. The Swedish excavations commenced at the highest part of the terrace and thereafter continued on the southern slope. During this excavation, the Crown Prince of Sweden, Gustaf VI Adolf visited the site and excavated himself.

Different kind of pottery from Stylli, tomb 10.

The tombs on the plateau, where the ground mainly consists of the local chavara, have all spacious dromoi and are from a typical point of view rather different from the ones on the southern slope. The former is long with a more or less regularly sloping floor, in some cases stairs are preserved. The latter are much shorter and widen much more abruptly. Their floor is horizontal. Both types have irregular chambers that usually are smaller than the big dromos. The burial customs are the same in all tombs. The buried were found outstretched on their back, surrounded by burial gifts. Coffins were not used. The burial place was used from Cypro-Geometric IIIA until Cypro-Archaic IIA. During the Cypro-Geometric period until Cypro-Archaic I the burials were made at the plateau. In the following periods, these tombs were reused at the same time as the southern slope became more popular.
