= Lord Lieutenant of West Yorkshire =

Ceremonial office in the United Kingdom

The office of Lord Lieutenant of West Yorkshire was created on 1 April 1974.

- Kenneth Hargreaves: 1 April 1974 – 1978 (previously West Riding Lieutenant since 1970)
- Sir William Bulmer: 1978–1985
- John Taylor, Baron Ingrow: 1985–1992
- John Lyles: 25 September 1992 – 2004
- Dame Ingrid Roscoe: 2004–1 September 2018
- Edmund Anderson: 3 September 2018 – 21 December 2025
- Adeeba Malik: 22 December 2025 – present
