= Billy Bulmer =

England international rugby league footballer and public servant

Personal information
- Full name: Sir James William Bulmer
- Born: 8 August 1881 Halifax, England
- Died: 26 June 1936 (aged 54) Bradford, England

Playing information
- Position: Forward
Club
Years	Team	Pld	T	G	FG	P
1901–07	Halifax	137	9	1	0	29
Representative
Years	Team	Pld	T	G	FG	P
1902–03	Yorkshire	4	0	0	0	0
1904	England	1	0	0	0	0

Sir James William Bulmer (8 August 1881 – 26 June 1936) was an English public servant and professional rugby league footballer. He played rugby league in the 1900s for Halifax as a forward and represented England in the first ever international rugby league game in 1904. During World War I, served on the Wool Textile Control Board and the Wool Statistical Committee. Bulmer was knighted in 1922 as recognition for his public services.

== Rugby career ==
Born in Halifax, West Riding of Yorkshire, Bulmer signed for Halifax in 1901 and played in two Challenge Cup finals for the club. The first was in Halifax's 7–0 victory over Salford in the 1902–03 Challenge Cup Final at Headingley Rugby Stadium, Leeds on Saturday 25 April 1903, in front of a crowd of 32,507. The following year he played in the 8–3 victory over Warrington in the 1903–04 Challenge Cup Final at The Willows, Salford on Saturday 30 April 1904, in front of a crowd of 17,041.

In 1902 he was selected to play for Yorkshire in the County Championship and played one match in the 1902–03 season and a further three in the 1903–04 season.

During the 1904–05 season he captained Halifax before retiring from the game in 1907.

=== International honours ===
Billy Bulmer won a cap for England in the 3–9 defeat by Other Nationalities at Central Park, Wigan on Tuesday 5 April 1904, in the first ever international rugby league match.

== Business career ==
Leaving school aged 10, Bulmer trained as a joiner and in 1903 purchased the joinery business of his employer, T. S. Dodd, on Dodd's retirement. Bulmer specialised in building cinemas and skating rinks. In 1912 he branched into the textile business, establishing a worsted spinning mill in Halifax and later owned several mills and warehouses in the Halifax and Bradford areas. During the First World War his mills were producing 1 million yards of khaki cloth for the British army, every 10 weeks.

Bulmer was chosen to serve on the Wool Textile Control Board, and the Wool Statistical Committee. Bulmer was knighted in 1922 as recognition for his public services.

Bulmer was also involved in the production of artificial silk, founding the Bulmer Rayon Artificial Silk Company in 1924 and when it was amalgamated into the British Acetate Silk Corporation, he became managing director.

In 1931 Bulmer resigned from Smith Bulmer & Co, the firm that he started in 1913 and in 1932 was adjudged bankrupt after the failure of the rayon business. After his discharge from bankruptcy in 1933 Bulmer became managing director of Bulmer and Lumb, the company he had purchased in 1931.

== Personal life ==
Bulmer married Florence Lumb in 1911 and they had three children, one of whom William Peter Bulmer, later became managing director of Bulmer & Lumb. Bulmer was a supporter of the Liberals and was President of the Yorkshire National Liberal Association. Once reputed to have been a millionaire, Bulmer left just £155 in his estate.
