= Ingrid Roscoe =

British art historian (1944–2020)

Dame Ingrid Roscoe DCVO DStJ FSA
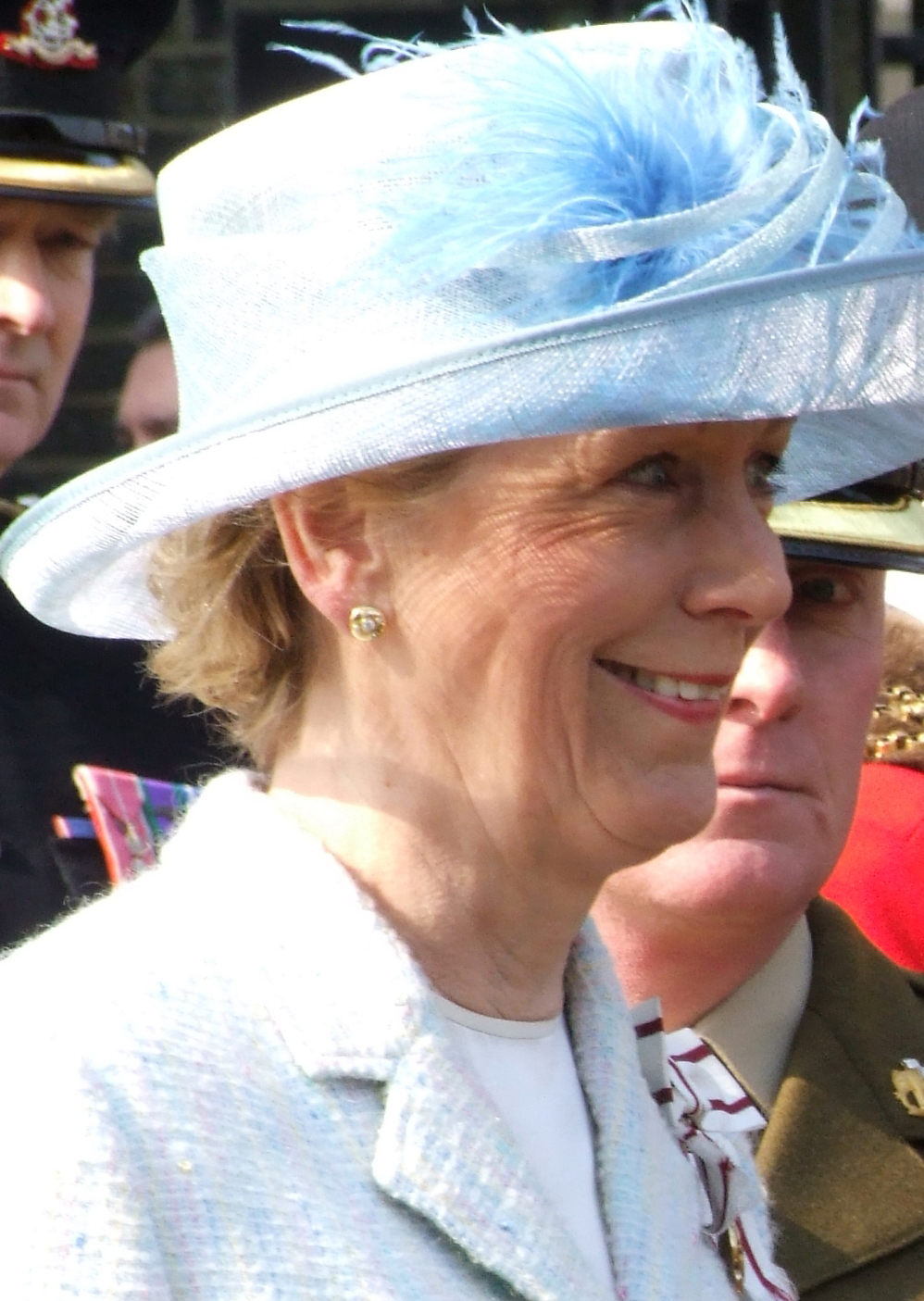
- Ingrid Roscoe, Inspecting the 3rd Battalion (Duke of Wellington's) of the Yorkshire Regiment (31 March 2007) in Halifax

Lord Lieutenant of West Yorkshire
- In office 2004–2018
- Monarch: Elizabeth II
- Preceded by: John Lyles
- Succeeded by: Edmund Anderson

Personal details
- Born: Ingrid Mary Allen; 27 May 1944
- Died: 28 June 2020 (aged 76)

Dame Ingrid Mary Roscoe, DCVO DStJ FSA (née Allen; 27 May 1944 – 28 June 2020) was a writer on English art and Lord Lieutenant of West Yorkshire from 2004 to 2018.

== Biography ==
Ingrid Mary Allen was born at Rugby School, Warwickshire in 1944 to Arthur Allen and Else, who had married after only meeting three times. Her father died during Ingrid's childhood. Her mother subsequently married Brigadier Kenneth Hargreaves who would become the last Lord Lieutenant of the West Riding of Yorkshire in 1970 and then the first Lord Lieutenant of West Yorkshire from 1974 to 1978. She had eight grandchildren and was the patron of numerous groups.

== Academic career ==
Roscoe abandoned an English degree at the University of Nottingham to marry John Richard Marshall Roscoe at the age of 19 on 5 October 1963. The couple had three children (Nick, Emma, and Katie). She subsequently studied at the University of Leeds, completing a BA in Fine Art and Cultural Studies in 1985 and a PhD in 1990. Her doctoral thesis on Peter Scheemakers was published by the Walpole Society. Roscoe remained at Leeds University in the 1990s as a Lecturer in British Sculpture in the Department of Fine Art.

== Publications ==
Roscoe was editor-in-chief and co-author of A Biographical Dictionary of Sculptors in Britain, 1660–1851, published in November 2009. The book is an update of Rupert Gunnis's Dictionary of British Sculptors 1660–1851 (originally published 1953).

== Honours ==
Roscoe was appointed a Deputy Lieutenant (DL) of West Yorkshire in 1994 and was the north of England's first female Lord Lieutenant when she became Lord Lieutenant of West Yorkshire in 2004. She retired in 2018.

She was elected as a Fellow of the Society of Antiquaries of London (FSA) in 1993.

She was awarded the Honorary degree of Doctor of Civil Law (DCL) the University of Huddersfield in 2007.

She was awarded the Honorary degree of Doctor of Laws (LL.D) by Leeds Metropolitan University in 2008.

She was awarded the honorary degree of Doctor of Laws (LL.D) by the University of Leeds on 15 July 2010.

She received an Honorary Fellowship from Bradford College in 2014.

She served as the Honorary Colonel of the University of Leeds Officers' Training Corps.

Country	Date	Appointment	Ribbon	Post-nominal letters	Notes
United Kingdom	2012	Dame of Justice of The Most Venerable Order of the Hospital of Saint John of Jerusalem		DStJ	
United Kingdom	16 June, 2017	Dame Commander of the Royal Victorian Order		DCVO	

Honorary titles
Preceded by John Lyles	Lord Lieutenant of West Yorkshire; 2004–2018	Succeeded by Edmund Anderson
