= Rupert Gunnis =

British art historian, collector and author

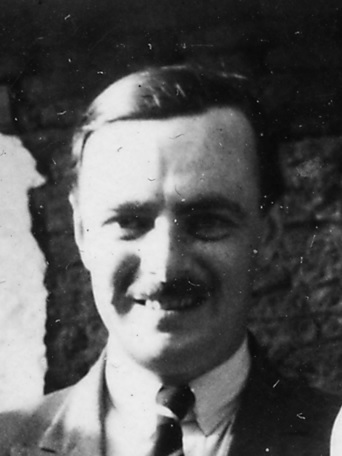
Rupert Gunnis

Rupert Forbes Gunnis (11 March 1899 – 31 July 1965) was an English collector and historian of British sculpture. He is best known for his Dictionary of British Sculptors 1660–1851, which "revolutionized the study of British sculpture, providing the foundation for all later studies on the subject".

== Life ==
Born in Cadogan Square, London, Gunnis was educated at Eton College. In 1923 he entered the Colonial Service, serving as private secretary to the Governor of Uganda (1923–1926) and then the Governor of Cyprus, Sir Ronald Storrs (November 1926 – June 1932). From 1932 to 1935 he worked as Inspector of Antiquities for the Cyprus Museum. Although Gunnis was a government official he acquired and sold antiquities illegally. In 1936 he was appointed as a member of the Antiquities Advisory board, and published his important book Historic Cyprus. A guide to its towns and villages, monasteries and castles which remains an important resource on Medieval and Ottoman monuments in Cyprus. For his research he visited 670 villages and recorded 1800 churches and chapels. He undertook small excavations on behalf of the Cyprus Museum although none of them were published, he excavated at Enkomi in 1927, at Styllio near Famagusta in 1928 and at the cemetery at the site of Kaparka in Marion.

Returning to England in 1939, Gunnis inherited a large fortune with which he settled at Hungershall Lodge with his Turkish Cypriot life partner Namuk Kemal in Tunbridge Wells and pursued his antiquarian interests. Around 1942 he began compiling an index of monumental sculptors: this may have originally been intended for inclusion in Katharine Esdaile's projected Dictionary of British Sculptors, and after her death in 1950 he published his Dictionary of British Sculptors 1660–1851 (completed in 1951 and published in 1953; 2nd ed. 1968). An expanded third edition was published in 2009 by Ingrid Roscoe and a team of scholars at the Henry Moore Institute.

Rupert Gunnis died, aged 66, at Stratfield Saye, the Duke of Wellington's estate halfway between Reading and Basingstoke. He is buried in the Streatfeild Mausoleum in Chiddingstone churchyard, Kent (Streatfeild was his mother's maiden name). He left estate valued at £132,279.

The author Evelyn Berckman dedicated her 1967 novel The Heir of Starvelings to Rupert Gunnis. The novel is an apparently true story, based an anecdotal tales told by Gunnis to the author. His contributions to the art world are cited in the foreword and he also plays a named part in the epilogue section, which is set in 1922.

== Works ==
- Historic Cyprus: a Guide to its Towns and Villages, Monasteries and Castles, London: Methuen, 1936.
- Famagusta: a short guide for the use of visitors, Nicosia: Government Printing Office, 1934, revised ed. 1936.
- Dictionary of British Sculptors, 1660–1851, 1953, revised ed. 1968.
