= Evelyn Berckman =

American writer and composer (1900–1978)

Evelyn Domenica Berckman (October 18, 1900 – September 18, 1978) was an American writer noted for her detective and Gothic horror novels. In addition to her novels and screenplays, she also wrote four non-fiction titles about British naval history.

== Personal life ==
Born in Philadelphia, Pennsylvania, Berckman was the daughter of woolen goods merchant Aaron Berkman and his wife Hannah who emigrated to the United States in 1891 and from 1900 to 1936 resided in Germantown, a suburb some seven miles from downtown Philadelphia.

After attending the Eastman School of Music in Rochester, New York, where she was a contemporary of Aaron Copland among others, Berckman spent the 1930s in New York City, living on East 60th Street on the city's Upper East Side. She worked as a piano teacher, and as a pianist and composer, before this career was curtailed by paralysis brought on by arduous sessions of piano practice. Her compositions were performed by the Pro Arte Quartet and the Philadelphia Orchestra among others.

Her first novel, The Evil of Time, was published in 1954. Berckman made several visits to London, staying for extended periods in various Mayfair hotels while she wrote, building up a second career "to avoid the threat of poverty". In 1960 she moved to the city permanently, settling in the Kensington area and living at various addresses until her death from heart disease in 1978.

Research for her books brought her in contact with art historian Rupert Gunnis, to whom she dedicated her 1967 novel The Heir of Starvelings, an apparently true story which she based on anecdotal information from Gunnis.

== Fiction ==
- The Evil of Time, Dodd 1954
- The Beckoning Dream, Dodd 1955 (filmed for television as Worse Than Murder, 1960, with Boris Karloff and Constance Ford)
- The Strange Bedfellow, Dodd 1956
- The Blind Villain / House of Terror Dodd 1957
- The Hovering Darkness, Dodd 1957
- No Known Grave, Dodd 1958
- Lament for Four Brides, Dodd 1959
- Do You Know This Voice?, Dodd 1960
- Blind Girl's Buff, Dodd 1962
- A Thing That Happens to You, Dodd 1964
- Keys From a Window, Eyre & Spottiswoode, 1965
- A Simple Case of Ill-Will, Dodd 1965
- Stalemate, Doubleday 1966
- The Heir of Starvelings, ('A Novel of Innocence and Evil'), Doubleday 1967
- A Case in Nullity, Doubleday 1968 (also published as A Hidden Malice)
- The Long Arm of the Prince, Hale 1968
- She Asked for It, Doubleday 1969
- The Voice of Air, Doubleday 1970
- A Finger to Her Lips, Doubleday 1971
- The Fourth Man on the Rope, Doubleday 1972
- The Stake in the Game, Doubleday 1973
- The Hidden Island. Hamish Hamilton 1973
- The Victorian Album, ('A Novel of Possession'), Doubleday 1973
- Wait, Just You Wait, Doubleday 1974. (Published as Wait, Hamish Hamilton, London, 1973)
- The Nightmare Chase, Doubleday 1975. (Published as Indecent Exposure, Hamish Hamilton, London, 1975)
- The Crown Estate, Doubleday 1976. (Published as The Blessed Plot, Hamish Hamilton. London, 1976)
- Journey's End, Doubleday 1977. (Published as Be All and End All, Hamish Hamilton, London, 1976)

== Non-fiction ==
- Nelson's Dear Lord: A Portrait of St. Vincent, Macmillan, London, 1962
- Hidden Navy, Hamish Hamilton, 1973
- Creators and Destroyers of the English Navy, Hamish Hamilton, London, 1974
- Victims of Piracy: Admiralty Court, 1575–1678, Hamish Hamilton, London, 1979

== Reception ==
Jervis added vastly to England's fame and fortune at a time when Napoleon was in the ascendant and most of the politicians were in despair. Evelyn Berckman has succeeded well in portraying a notably difficult but able man.

— The Sphere, 1962.

The Strange Bedfellow," by Evelyn Berckman (Eyre and Spottiswoode; ns. 6d.), is a superb Gothic thriller-cum-detective-novel, in which the crime and problem are more than 200 years old.

— Illustrated London News, 1957.

The Beckoning Dream (Eyre and Spottiswoode. 10s. 6d.) demonstrates that, if you are a rich family with some unpleasant secrets, it is just as well not to have a blackmailing relative. Crisply written by a young American writer, Miss Evelyn Berckman.

— Illustrated London News, 1956.

Not so richly baroque as "The Strange Bedfellow", but uncommonly creepy and distinguished

— Illustrated London News, 1958.
