= West Yorkshire =

County of England

- Metropolitan and ceremonial county
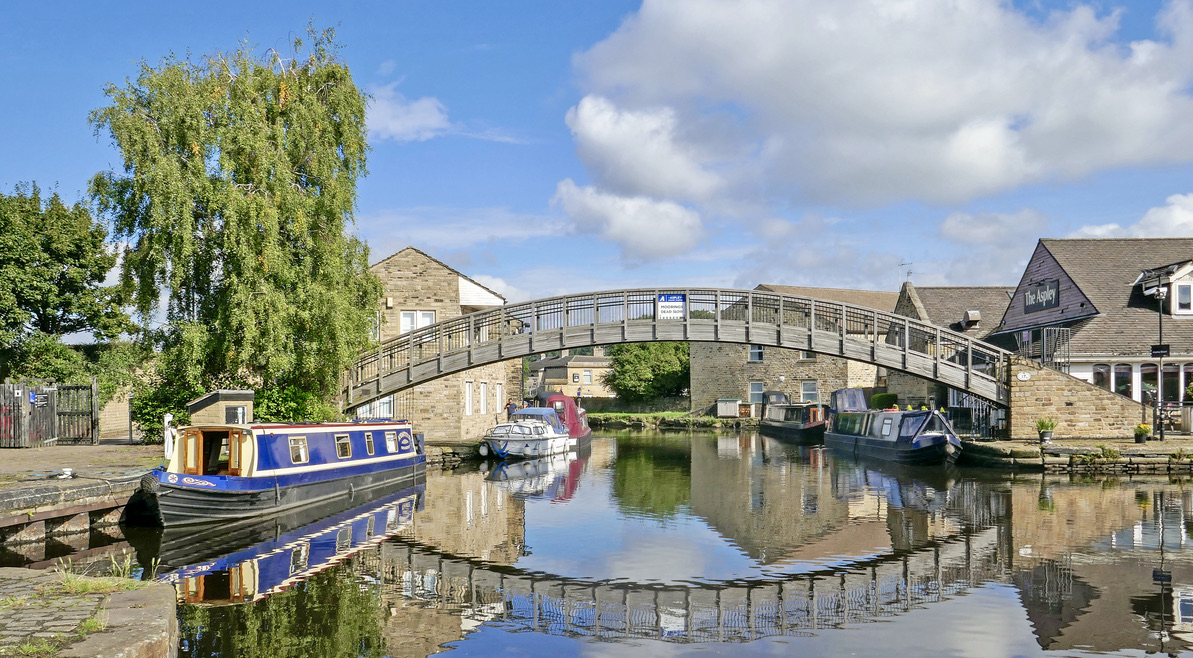
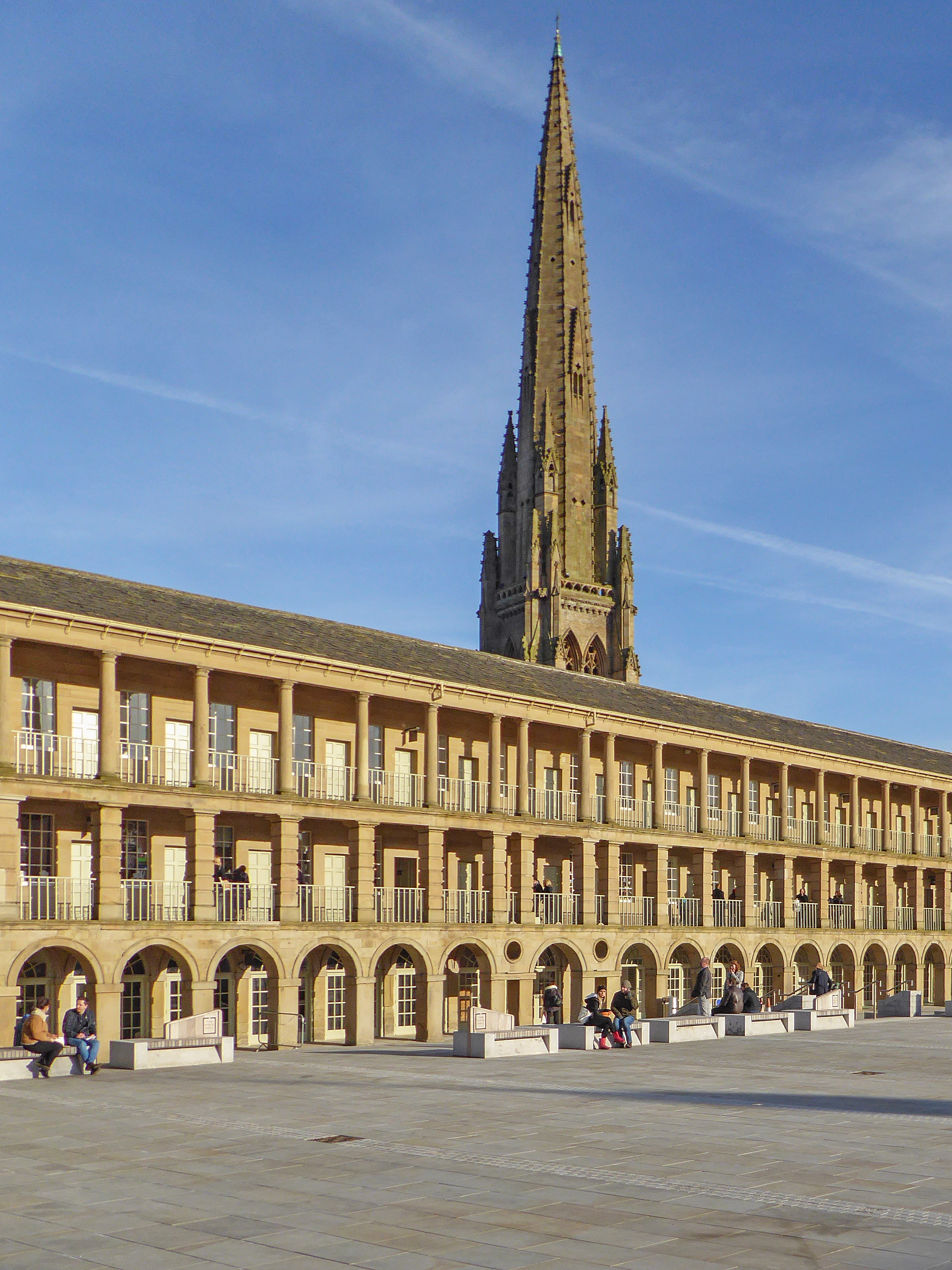
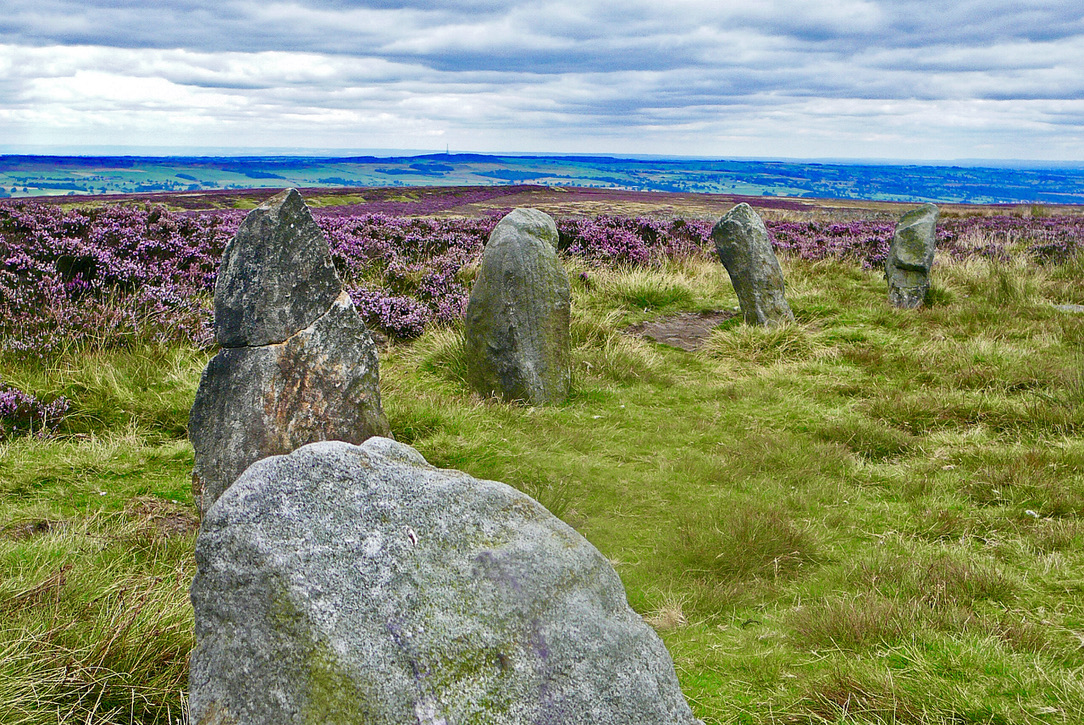
- Aspley Basin on the Broad Canal (Huddersfield), the Piece Hall (Halifax) and Ilkley Moor (near Ilkley)

- West Yorkshire within England
- Coordinates: 53°45′N 1°40′W
- Sovereign state: United Kingdom
- Constituent country: England
- Region: Yorkshire and the Humber
- Established: 1 April 1974
- Preceded by: West Riding of Yorkshire
- Origin: Local Government Act 1972
- Time zone: UTC+0 (GMT)
  - Summer (DST): UTC+1 (BST)
- UK Parliament: List of MPs
- Police: West Yorkshire Police
- Ceremonial county
- Lord Lieutenant: Adeeba Malik
- High Sheriff: Ruby Khalid Bhatti
- Area: 2,029 km^{2} (783 sq mi)
  - Rank: 29th of 48
- Population (2024): 2,435,236
  - Rank: 4th of 48
  - Density: 1,200/km^{2} (3,100/sq mi)
- Metropolitan county
- Government: West Yorkshire Combined Authority
- Mayor: Tracy Brabin (L)
- Admin HQ: Leeds
- GSS code: E11000006 (county); E47000003 (city region)
- ITL: TLE4
- Website: westyorks-ca.gov.uk
- Districts
- Districts of West Yorkshire; Metropolitan districts
- Districts: 1. Leeds; 2. Wakefield; 3. Kirklees; 4. Calderdale; 5. Bradford

West Yorkshire is a metropolitan and ceremonial county in the Yorkshire and the Humber region of England. It borders North Yorkshire to the north and east, South Yorkshire and Derbyshire to the south, Greater Manchester to the south-west, and Lancashire to the west. The city of Leeds is the largest settlement.

The county has an area of 2,029 km^{2} (783 sq mi) and had an estimated population of 2,435,236 in 2024. The centre of the county is urbanised. Leeds is in the north-east, the city of Wakefield in the south-east, Huddersfield in the south-west, and the city of Bradford in the north-west. The outer areas of the county are rural. For local government purposes the county comprises five metropolitan boroughs: Bradford, Calderdale, Kirklees, Leeds, and Wakefield, which collaborate through West Yorkshire Combined Authority. The county was created in 1974 from the central part of the West Riding of Yorkshire.

The western part of West Yorkshire is in the South Pennines, and contains a small part of the Peak District National Park. It is characterised by steep valleys and is the source of the River Calder, which flows past Wakefield before meeting the Aire, which flows through Leeds, near Castleford. The landscape becomes flatter in the east, and the eastern boundary of the county is on the edge of the Vale of York.

Remnants of strong coal, wool and iron ore industries remain in the county, having attracted people over the centuries, and this can be seen in the buildings and architecture. Several railways and the M1, M621, M606, A1(M) and M62 motorways traverse the county.

== Governance ==
=== Local ===
For local government purposes West Yorkshire is divided into five metropolitan boroughs: Bradford, Calderdale, Kirklees, Leeds, and Wakefield. Their councils are the principal bodies responsible for the provision of local government services in the county.

The councils collaborate through West Yorkshire Joint Services and the West Yorkshire Combined Authority (see below).

==== History ====
The Local Government Act 1888 reformed English local government by creating administrative counties, county boroughs, and elected county councils and county borough councils to govern them. County boroughs largely consisted of those settlements with a population over 50,000, and administrative counties covered smaller towns and rural areas. The three ridings of Yorkshire were reconstituted as the administrative counties of County of York, East Riding, County of York, North Riding, and County of York, West Riding. Within what would later become West Yorkshire, Bradford, Halifax, Huddersfield, and Leeds were made county boroughs.

The Local Government Act 1972, which came into effect in 1974, reformed English local government again. It introduced metropolitan counties, which covered the largest urban areas, and non-metropolitan counties elsewhere. The metropolitan county of West Yorkshire was created from the central part of the West Riding and divided into five metropolitan boroughs. The provision of local government services was divided between West Yorkshire County Council and the district councils of the five boroughs. In Local Government Act 1985, which came into effect the following year, abolished the county council and transferred many of its powers and responsibilities the borough councils. It also created or allowed to be created joint bodies, notably the West Yorkshire Passenger Transport Executive, in which all the borough councils participated.

=== Regional ===
The West Yorkshire Combined Authority is a strategic authority established in 2014. It allows the five metropolitan borough councils to collaborate. The authority was restructured in 2021 to be led by a directly elected mayor, the Mayor of West Yorkshire, and at the same time gained additional powers over areas including education, housing, and planning. The current mayor is Tracy Brabin, who was first elected in 2021 and successfully defended her seat in 2024.

As part of the establishment of the combined authority, the West Yorkshire Passenger Transport Executive was abolished and its functions transferred to the new authority.

=== Parliamentary constituencies ===
West Yorkshire contains 22 constituencies of the Parliament of the United Kingdom, and parts of the two constituencies of Selby and Weatherby and Easingwold. As of the 2024 United Kingdom general election, 19 of the constituencies are held by Members of Parliament from the Labour Party, two by members of the Conservative Party, and one by an Independent politician.

== Geography ==
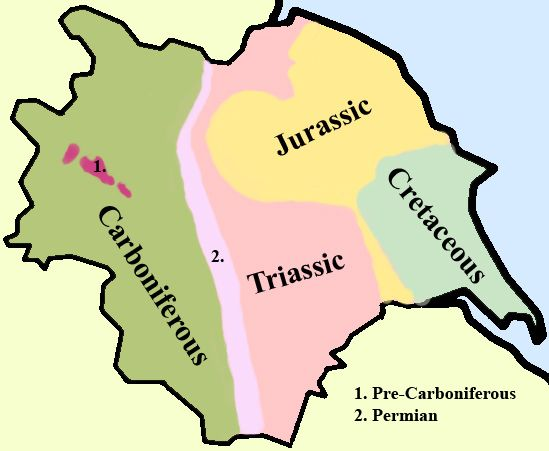
Geology of Yorkshire

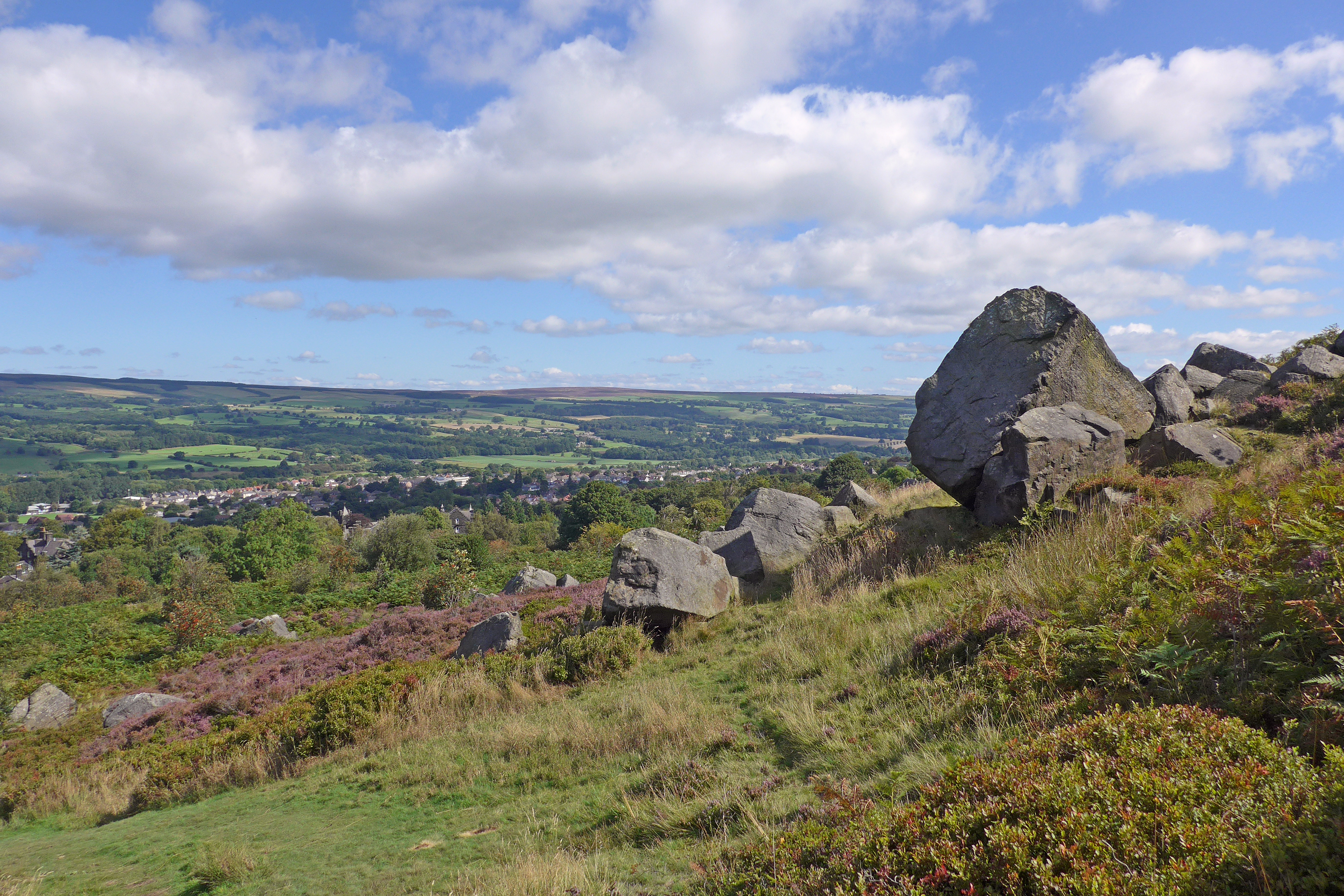
Ilkley Moor

The county borders, going anticlockwise from the west: Lancashire, Greater Manchester, Derbyshire, South Yorkshire and North Yorkshire. The terrain of the county mostly consists of the Pennines and its foothills which dominate the west of the county and gradually descend into the Vale of York and Humberhead Levels in the east. Geologically, it lies almost entirely on rocks of carboniferous age which form the inner Southern Pennine fringes in the west and the Yorkshire coalfield further eastwards. In the extreme east of the metropolitan county there are younger deposits of Magnesian Limestone. Areas in the west such as Bradford and Calderdale are dominated by the scenery of the eastern slopes of the South Pennines, dropping from upland in the west down to the east, and dissected by many steep-sided valleys while a small part of the northern Peak District extends into the south west of Kirklees. Large-scale industry, housing, public and commercial buildings of differing heights, transport routes and open countryside conjoin. The dense network of roads, canals and railways and urban development, confined by valleys creates dramatic interplay of views between settlements and the surrounding hillsides, as shaped the first urban-rural juxtapositions of David Hockney. Where most rural the land crops up in the such rhymes and folklore as On Ilkla Moor Baht 'at, date unknown, the early 19th century novels and poems of the Brontë family often in and around Haworth and long-running light comedy-drama Last of the Summer Wine in the 20th century.

The carboniferous rocks of the Yorkshire coalfield further east have produced a rolling landscape with hills, escarpments and broad valleys in the outer fringes of the Pennines. In this landscape there is widespread evidence of both current and former industrial activity. There are numerous derelict or converted mine buildings and recently landscaped former spoil heaps. The scenery is a mixture of built up areas, industrial land with some dereliction, and farmed open country. Ribbon developments along transport routes including canal, road and rail are prominent features of the area although some remnants of the pre industrial landscape and semi-natural vegetation still survive. However, many areas are affected by urban fringe pressures creating fragmented and downgraded landscapes and ever present are urban influences from major cities, smaller industrial towns and former mining villages. In the Magnesian Limestone belt to the east of the Leeds and Wakefield areas is an elevated ridge with smoothly rolling scenery, dissected by dry valleys. Here, there is a large number of country houses and estates with parkland, estate woodlands, plantations and game coverts. The rivers Aire and Calder drain the area, flowing from west to east.

== History ==
Wakefield's Parish Church was raised to cathedral status in 1888 and after the elevation of Wakefield to diocese, Wakefield Council immediately sought city status and this was granted in July 1888. However the Industrial Revolution, which changed West and South Yorkshire significantly, led to the growth of Leeds and Bradford, which became the area's two largest cities (Leeds being the largest in Yorkshire). Leeds was granted city status in 1893 and Bradford in 1897. The name of Leeds Town Hall reflects the fact that at its opening in 1858 Leeds was not yet a city, while Bradford renamed its Town Hall as City Hall in 1965.

Post-1974		Pre-1974			
Metropolitan county	Metropolitan borough	County boroughs	Non-county boroughs	Urban districts	Rural districts
West Yorkshire is an amalgamation of 53 former local government districts, including five county boroughs and ten municipal boroughs.	Bradford	Bradford	Keighley	Baildon • Bingley • Denholme • Ilkley • Queensbury and Shelf (Note: Queensbury and Shelf Urban District was split between Bradford and Calderdale in 1974: Queensbury civil parish became part of Bradford; Shelf civil parish became part of Calderdale.) •Silsden • Shipley	Skipton
West Yorkshire is an amalgamation of 53 former local government districts, including five county boroughs and ten municipal boroughs.	Calderdale	Halifax	Brighouse • Todmorden	Elland • Hebden Royd • Queensbury and Shelf • Ripponden • Sowerby Bridge	Hepton
West Yorkshire is an amalgamation of 53 former local government districts, including five county boroughs and ten municipal boroughs.	Kirklees	Huddersfield • Dewsbury	Batley • Spenborough	Colne Valley • Denby Dale • Heckmondwike • Holmfirth • Kirkburton • Meltham • Mirfield	
West Yorkshire is an amalgamation of 53 former local government districts, including five county boroughs and ten municipal boroughs.	Leeds	Leeds	Morley • Pudsey	Aireborough • Garforth • Horsforth • Otley • Rothwell	Tadcaster • Wharfedale • Wetherby
West Yorkshire is an amalgamation of 53 former local government districts, including five county boroughs and ten municipal boroughs.	Wakefield	Wakefield	Castleford • Ossett • Pontefract	Featherstone • Hemsworth • Horbury • Knottingley • Normanton • Stanley	Hemsworth • Osgoldcross • Wakefield

West Yorkshire was formed as a metropolitan county in 1974, by the Local Government Act 1972, and corresponds roughly to the core of the historic West Riding of Yorkshire and the county boroughs of Bradford, Dewsbury, Halifax, Huddersfield, Leeds, and Wakefield.

West Yorkshire Metropolitan County Council inherited the use of West Riding County Hall at Wakefield, opened in 1898, from the West Riding County Council in 1974. Since 1987 it has been the headquarters of Wakefield City Council.

The county initially had a two-tier structure of local government with a strategic-level county council and five districts providing most services. In 1986, throughout England the metropolitan county councils were abolished. The functions of the county council were devolved to the boroughs; joint-boards covering fire, police and public transport; and to other special joint arrangements. Organisations such as the West Yorkshire Police (governed by the West Yorkshire Police and Crime Commissioner) continue to operate on this basis.

Although the county council was abolished, West Yorkshire continues to form a metropolitan and ceremonial county with a Lord Lieutenant of West Yorkshire and a High Sheriff.

=== Green belt ===
West Yorkshire contains green belt interspersed throughout the county, surrounding the West Yorkshire Urban Area. It was first drawn up in the 1950s. All the county's districts contain large portions of green belt.

=== Parish ===
West Yorkshire has close ties with Lancashire in terms of history, local identity and infrastructure including with the War of the Roses and Lancashire and Yorkshire Railway. Up until the 19th century, the town of Todmorden was in Lancashire but was moved into Yorkshire. In the 1974 boundary review, the towns of Earby and Barnoldswick were moved into the Pendle district of Lancashire. The civil parish of Saddleworth in Oldham was the only part of West Riding of Yorkshire to be moved into the county of Greater Manchester. The villages in the parish border the towns of Huddersfield and Holmfirth. There is a strong identity debate with Saddleworth residents who still maintain close connections with Yorkshire including the Saddleworth White Rose Society.

=== Local legislation ===
West Yorkshire Act 1980
- Act of Parliament
- Parliament of the United Kingdom
- Long title: An Act to re-enact with amendments and to extend certain local enactments in force within the metropolitan county of West Yorkshire; to confer further powers on the West Yorkshire Metropolitan County Council, the City of Bradford Metropolitan Council, the Borough Council of Calderdale, the Council of the Borough of Kirklees, the Leeds City Council and the Council of the City of Wakefield; to make further provision with regard to the environment, local government and improvement of the county; and for other purposes.
- Citation: 1980 c. xiv

Dates
- Royal assent: 1 May 1980
Other legislation
Amended by	Local Government (Miscellaneous Provisions) Act 1982

Status: Amended

Text of statute as originally enacted

The West Yorkshire Act 1980 (c. xiv) was passed to amend existing local acts of Parliament in the West Yorkshire area, and to confer specific powers on West Yorkshire County Council, as well as the City of Bradford Metropolitan District Council, Calderdale Metropolitan Borough Council, Kirklees Council, Leeds City Council and Wakefield Council.

== Demography ==
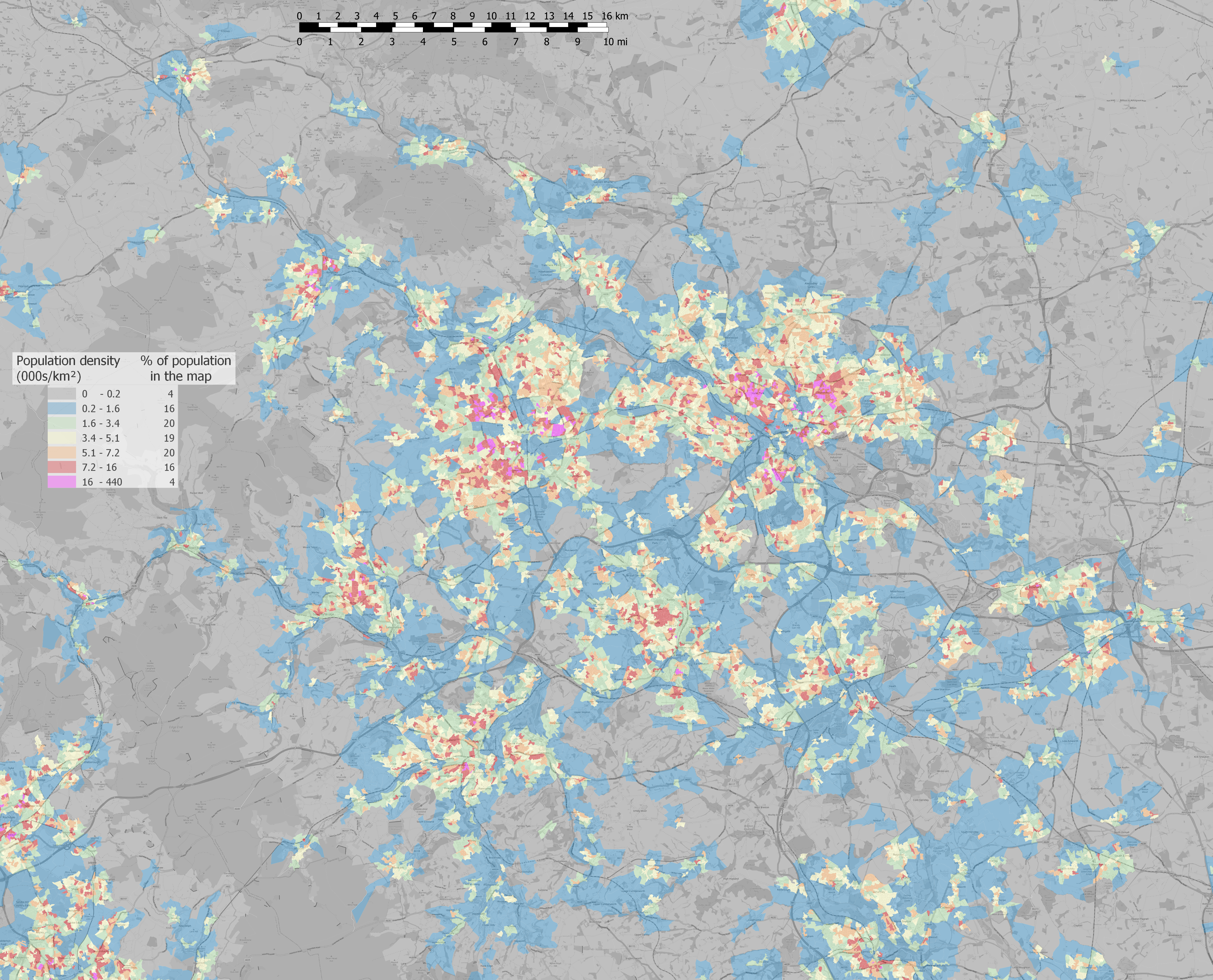
Population density in the 2011 census in West Yorkshire

The county's boroughs
District	Area km^{2}	Population	Density
City of Bradford	366.42	523,100	1,346
Calderdale	363.92	200,100	545
Kirklees	408.61	401,000	975
City of Leeds	551.72	761,100	1,360
City of Wakefield	338.61	321,600	949

The county's settlements by metropolitan borough
Metropolitan borough	Seat	Other places
City of Bradford	Bradford City Hall, Bradford	Addingham, Baildon, Bingley, Burley in Wharfedale, Cottingley, Crossflatts, Cross Roads, Cullingworth, Denholme, East and West Morton, Eccleshill, Eldwick, Esholt, Great Horton, Gilstead, Harden, Haworth, Ilkley, Keighley, Manningham, Menston, Oakworth, Oxenhope, Queensbury, Riddlesden, Saltaire, Sandy Lane, Shipley, Silsden, Stanbury, Steeton, Thornbury, Thornton, Tong, Undercliffe, Wibsey, Wilsden.
Calderdale	Halifax Town Hall, Halifax	Bailiff Bridge, Boothtown, Brighouse, Copley, Cragg Vale, Elland, Greetland, Hebden Bridge, Heptonstall, Hipperholme, Holywell Green, Luddendenfoot, Mytholmroyd, Norwood Green, Rastrick, Ripponden, Rishworth, Shelf, Shibden, Sowerby Bridge, Todmorden
Kirklees	Huddersfield Town Hall, Huddersfield	Almondbury, Batley, Birkby, Birkenshaw, Birstall, Cleckheaton, Dalton, Denby Dale, Dewsbury, Emley, Golcar, Gomersal, Hartshead, Hartshead Moor, Heckmondwike, Holmfirth, Honley, Kirkburton, Kirkheaton, Linthwaite, Liversedge, Marsden, Meltham, Mirfield, New Mill, Norristhorpe, Roberttown, Scammonden, Shelley, Shepley, Skelmanthorpe, Slaithwaite, Thornhill
City of Leeds	Leeds Civic Hall, Leeds	Allerton Bywater, Beeston, Boston Spa, Collingham, Garforth, Guiseley, Harewood, Harehills, Headingley, Holbeck, Horsforth, Hyde Park, Gipton, Kippax, Kirkstall, Ledsham, Ledston, Methley, Middleton, Morley, New Farnley, Otley, Oulton, Pool-in-Wharfedale, Pudsey, Rothwell, Rawdon, Scarcroft, Scholes, Stourton, Swillington, Walton (Leeds), Wetherby, Yeadon, Woodhouse
City of Wakefield	West Riding County Hall, Wakefield	Ackworth, Alverthorpe, Castleford, Crigglestone, Crofton, Durkar, Fairburn Ings, Featherstone, Ferrybridge, Fitzwilliam, Hemsworth, Horbury, Knottingley, Newmillerdam, Normanton, Nostell, Ossett, Outwood, Pontefract, Ryhill, Sandal, Sharlston, Stanley, Walton (Wakefield), West Bretton, Wrenthorpe

Ethnic Group	Year											
Ethnic Group	1971 estimations		1981 estimations		1991 census		2001 census		2011 census		2021 census	
Ethnic Group	Number	%	Number	%	Number	%	Number	%	Number	%	Number	%
White: Total	–	96.6%	1,937,375	93.7%	1,911,618	91.7%	1,842,813	88.6%	1,819,818	81.8%	1,801,352	76.6%
White: British	–	–	–	–	–	–	1,798,413	86.5%	1,746,295	78.4%	1,693,845	72.0%
White: Irish	–	–	–	–	–	–	18,859	0.9%	14,910	0.7%	13,893	0.6%
White: Gypsy or Irish Traveller	–	–	–	–	–	–	–	–	1,660	0.1%	2,311	0.1%
White: Roma	–	–	–	–	–	–	–	–	–	–	3,982	0.2%
White: Other	–	–	–	–	–	–	25,541	1.2%	56,953	2.6%	87,321	3.7%
Asian or Asian British: Total	–	–	100,191	4.8%	136,824	6.6%	185,907	9%	291,547	13.1%	372,728	15.9%
Asian or Asian British: Indian	–	–	29,352		36,762		42,430	2.0%	53,152	2.4%	62,407	2.7%
Asian or Asian British: Pakistani	–	–	60,803		84,978		122,210	5.9%	189,708	8.5%	250,497	10.7%
Asian or Asian British: Bangladeshi	–	–	3,845		6,344		8,213	0.4%	15,632	0.7%	20,099	0.9%
Asian or Asian British: Chinese	–	–	2,912		3,969		5,734	0.3%	10,783	0.5%	12,516	0.5%
Asian or Asian British: Other Asian	–	–	3,279		4,771		7,320	0.4%	22,272	1.0%	27,209	1.2%
Black or Black British: Total	–	–	20,770	1%	25,135	1.2%	20,771	1%	46,476	2.1%	72,257	3.1%
Black or Black British: African	–	–	2,236		2,634		4,216	0.2%	24,685	1.1%	47,888	2.0%
Black or Black British: Caribbean	–	–	13,088		15,552		14,409	0.7%	15,581	0.7%	15,588	0.7%
Other Black	–	–	5,446		6,949		2,146	0.1%	6,210	0.3%	8,781	0.4%
Mixed or British Mixed: Total	–	–	–	–	–	–	25,081	1.2%	48,126	2.2%	64,947	2.8%
Mixed: White and Black Caribbean	–	–	–	–	–	–	11,263	0.5%	20,827	0.9%	23,573	1.0%
Mixed: White and Black African	–	–	–	–	–	–	1,842	0.1%	4,624	0.2%	7,756	0.3%
Mixed: White and Asian	–	–	–	–	–	–	8,049	0.4%	15,098	0.7%	21,014	0.9%
Mixed: Other Mixed	–	–	–	–	–	–	3,927	0.2%	7,577	0.3%	12,604	0.5%
Other: Total	–	–	8,363		10,923		4,639	0.2%	20,091	0.9%	40,295	1.7%
Other: Arab	–	–	–	–	–	–	–	–	9,212	0.4%	11,515	0.5%
Other: Any other ethnic group	–	–					4,639	0.2%	10,879	0.5%	28,780	1.2%
Non-White: Total	–	3.4%	129,326	6.3%	172,882	8.3%	236,398	11.4%	406,240	18.2%	550,227	23.4%
Total	–	100%	2,066,701	100%	2,084,500	100%	2,079,211	100%	2,226,058	100%	2,351,579	100%

West Yorkshire is ethnically diverse, hosting large populations of multiple ethnic minority groups. Most notably, the city of Bradford is well known for its large concentration of British Pakistanis, the highest by percentage in the country. Leeds and Kirklees also have large British Pakistani populations. Kirklees also hosts a large population of British Indians. West Yorkshire is home to a large Eastern European population, particularly British Poles. Ethnic minorities totalled to over 21% of West Yorkshire's population in 2011.

Distribution of ethnic groups in West Yorkshire according to the 2021 census.
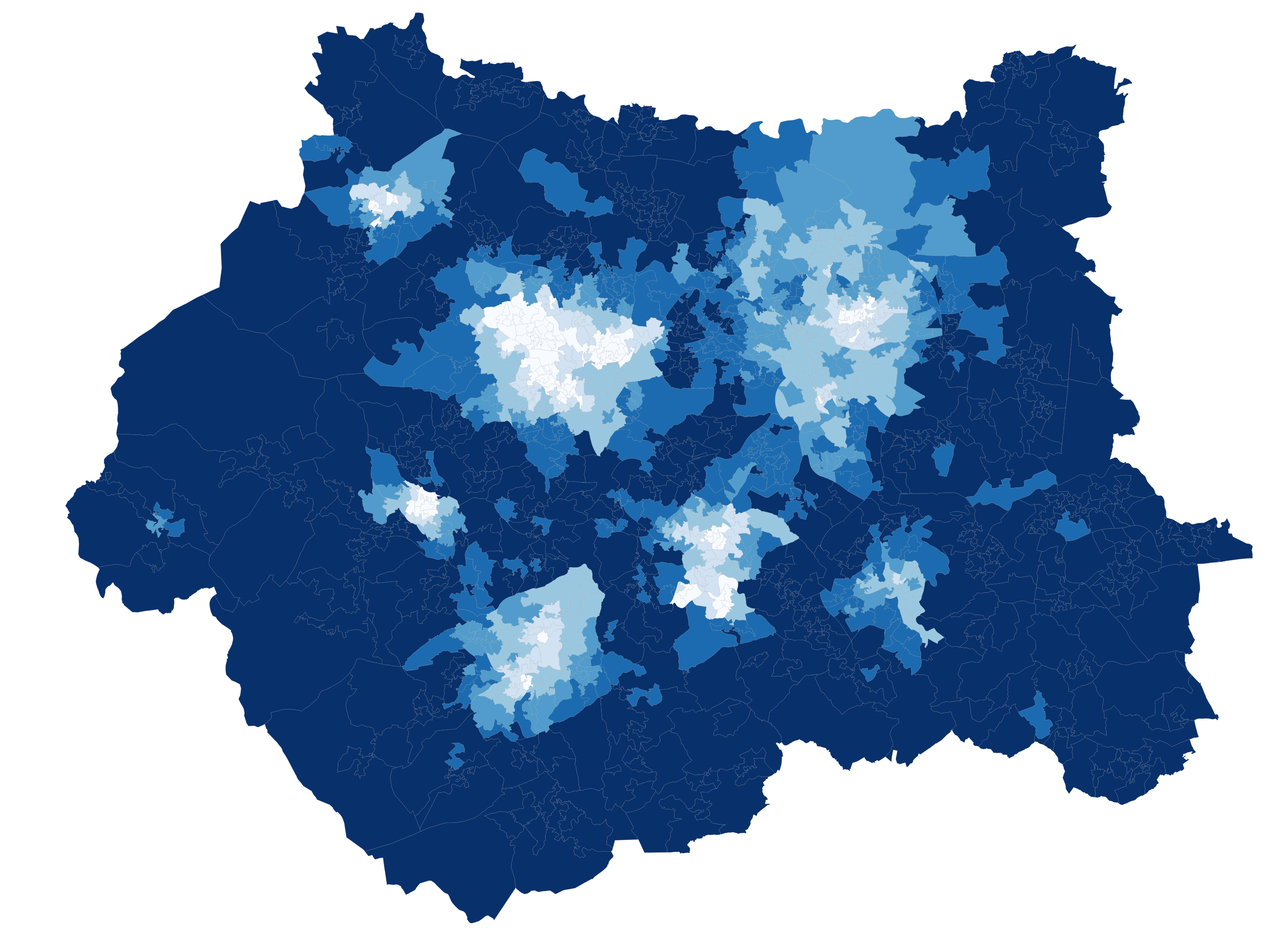
White (2021)

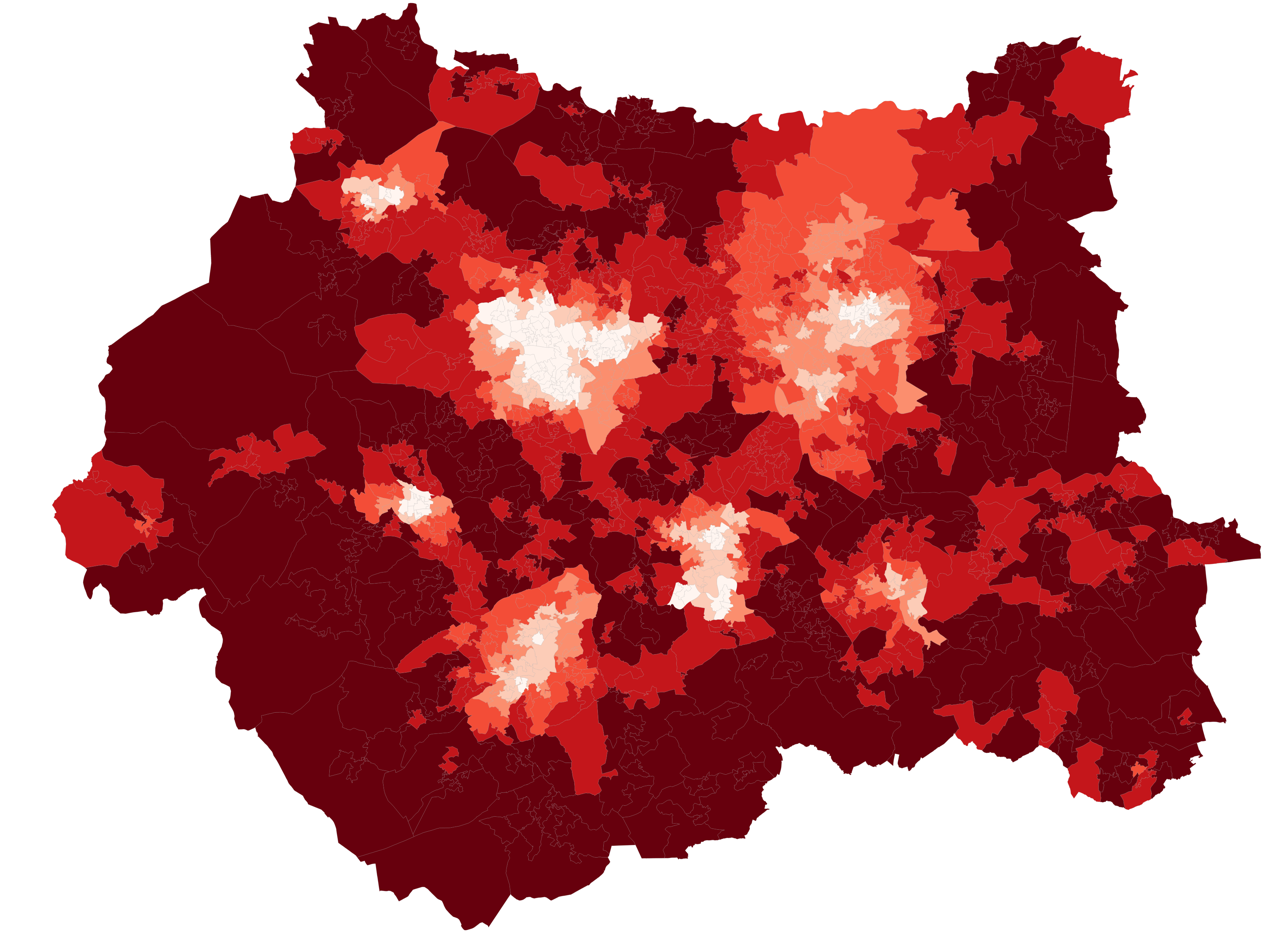
White-British

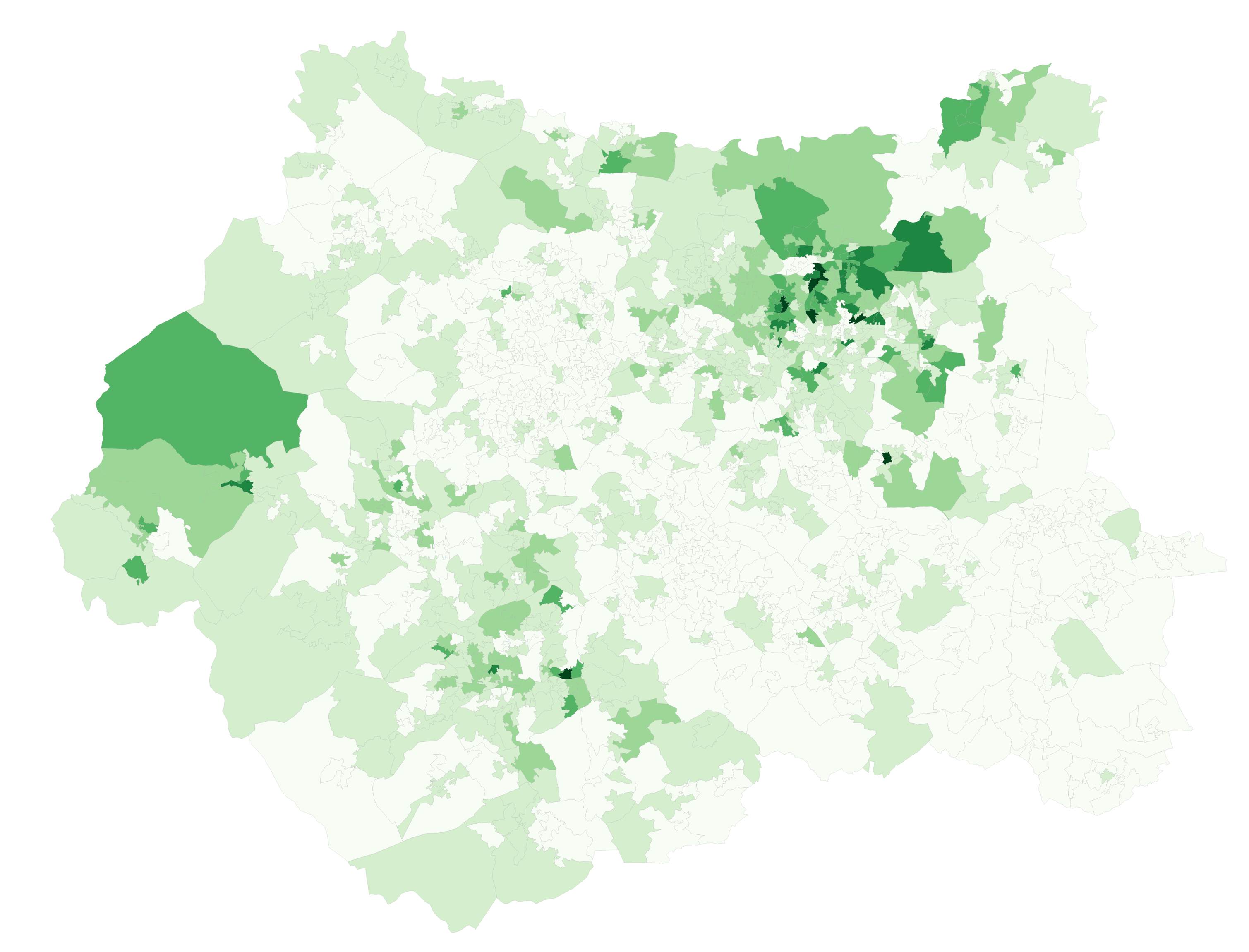
White-Irish

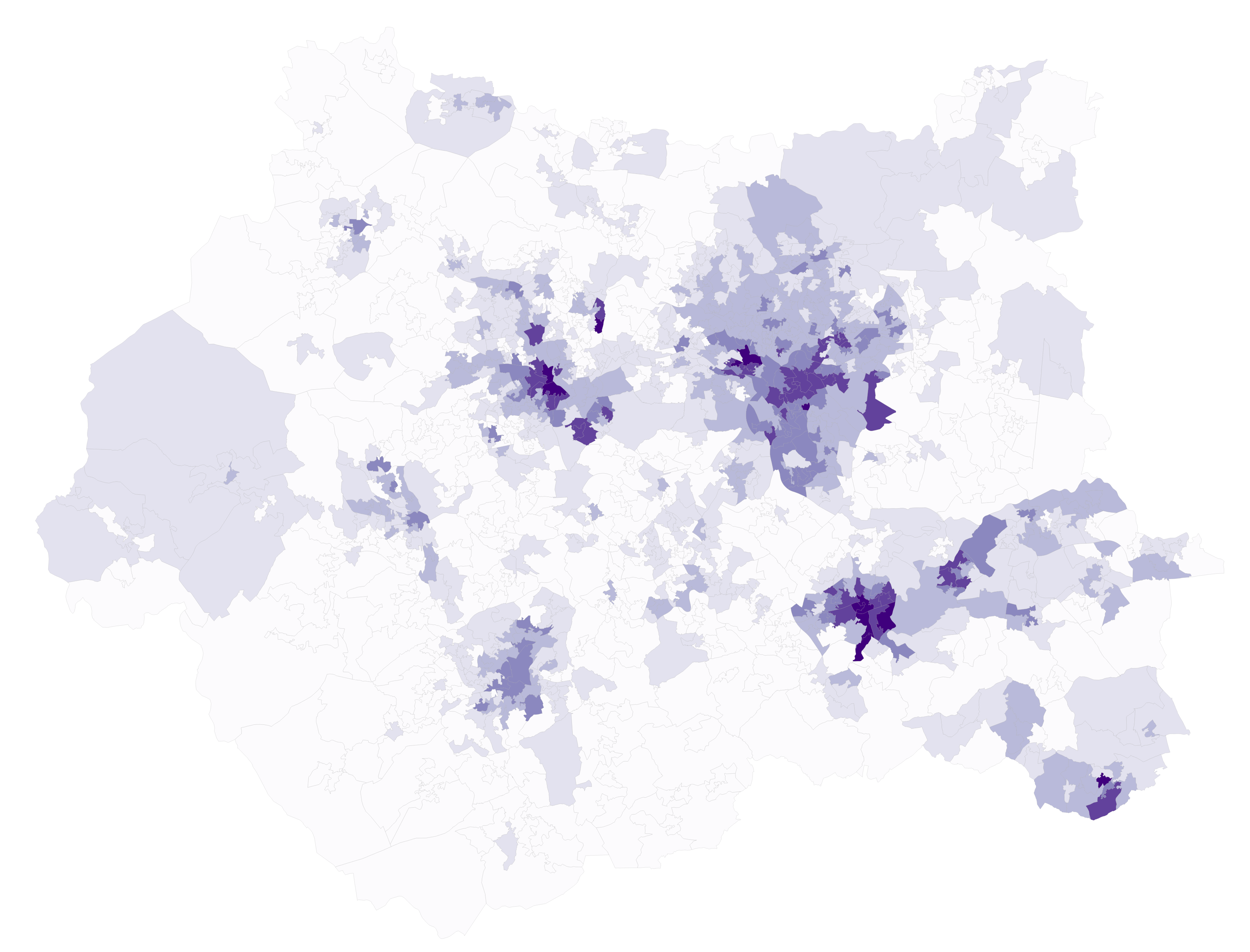
White-Other

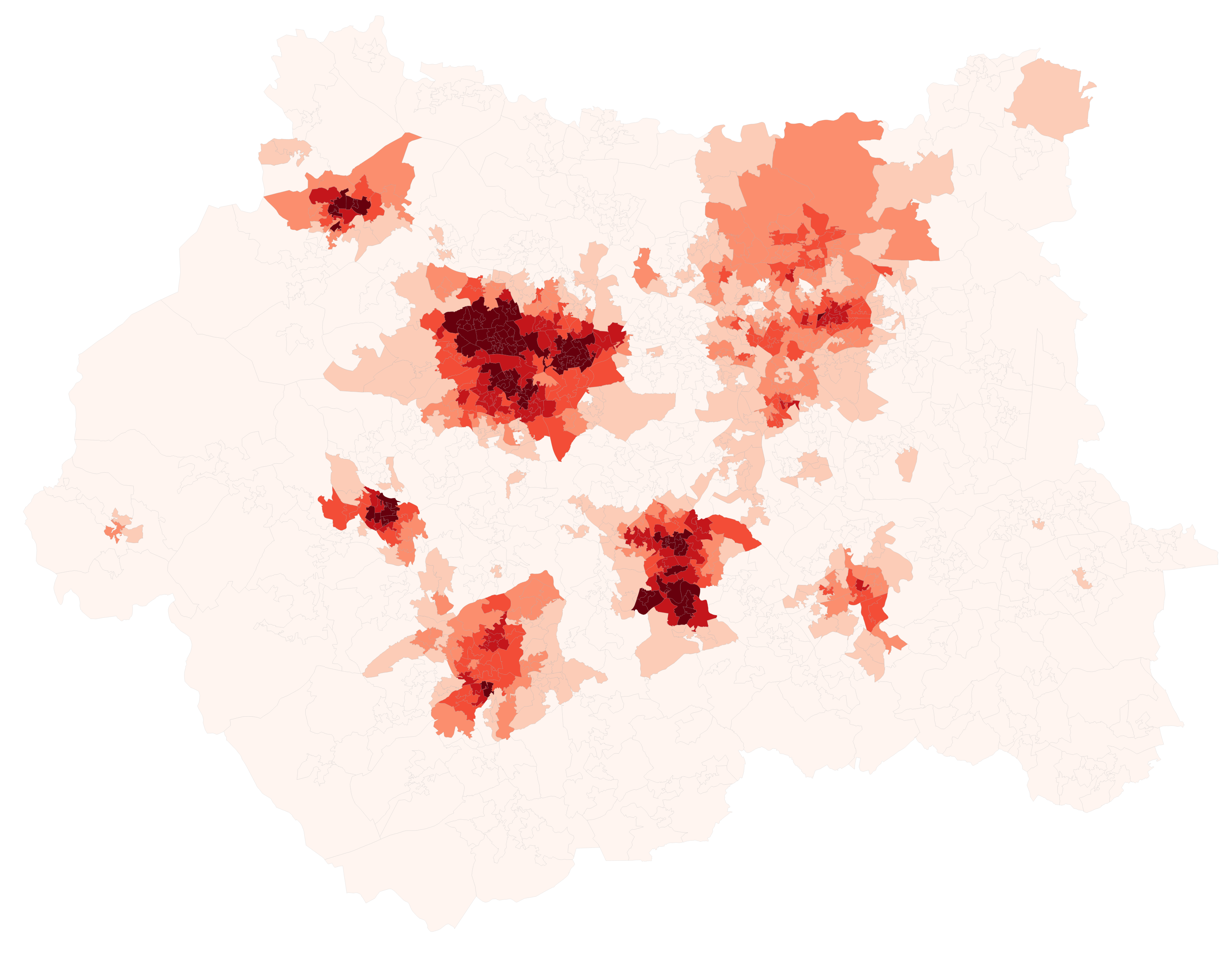
Asian (2021)

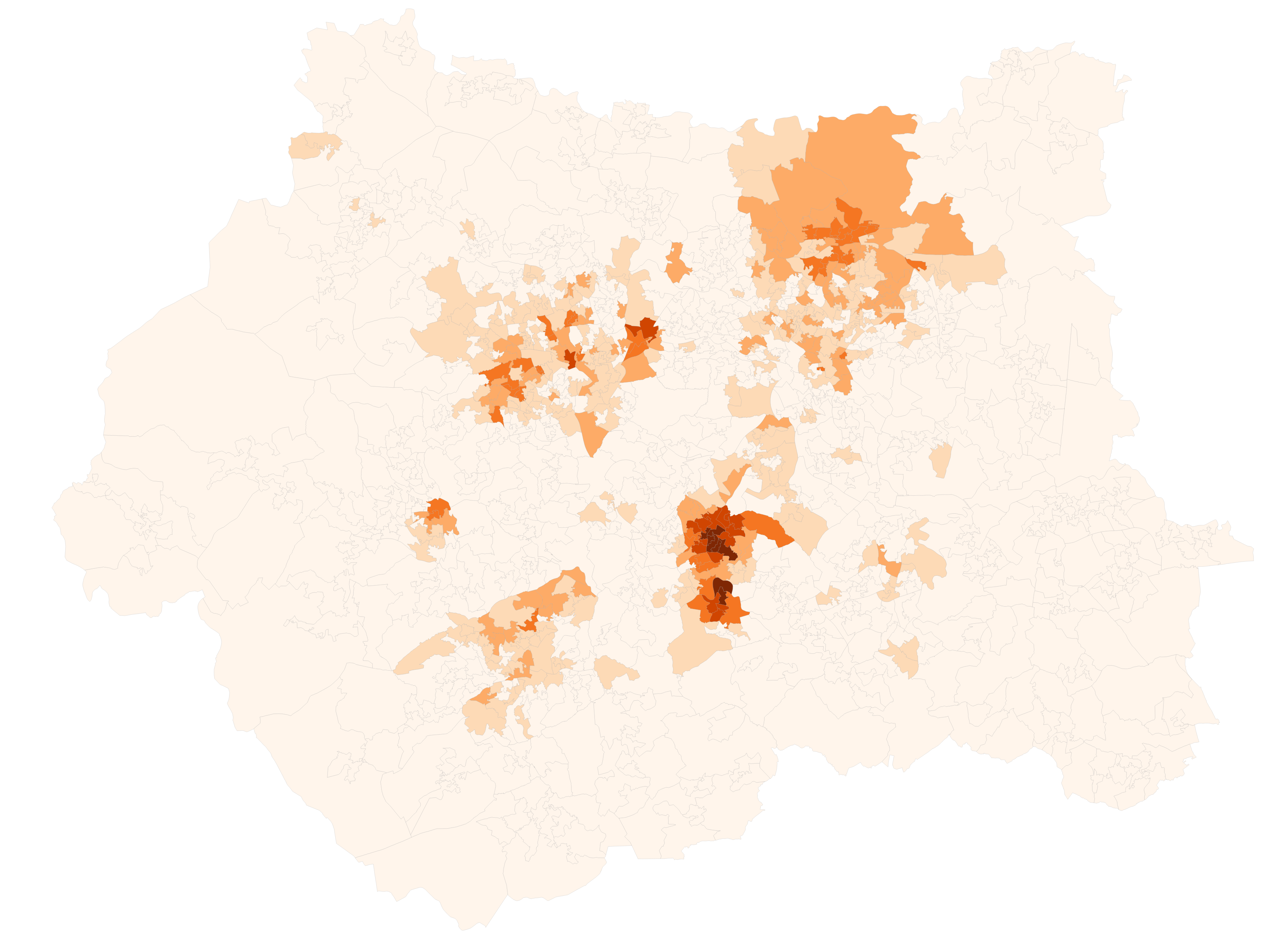
Asian-Indian

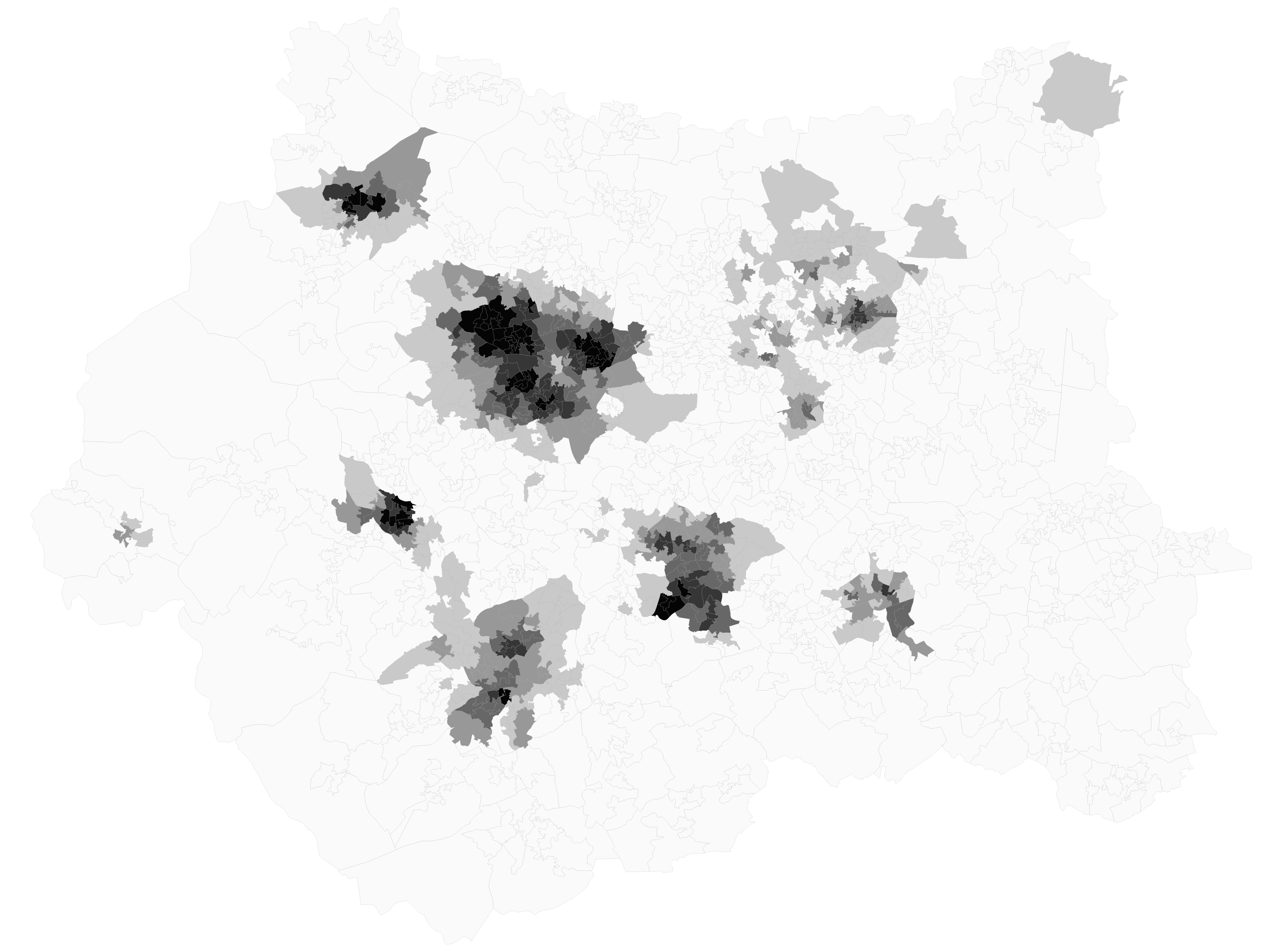
Asian-Pakistani

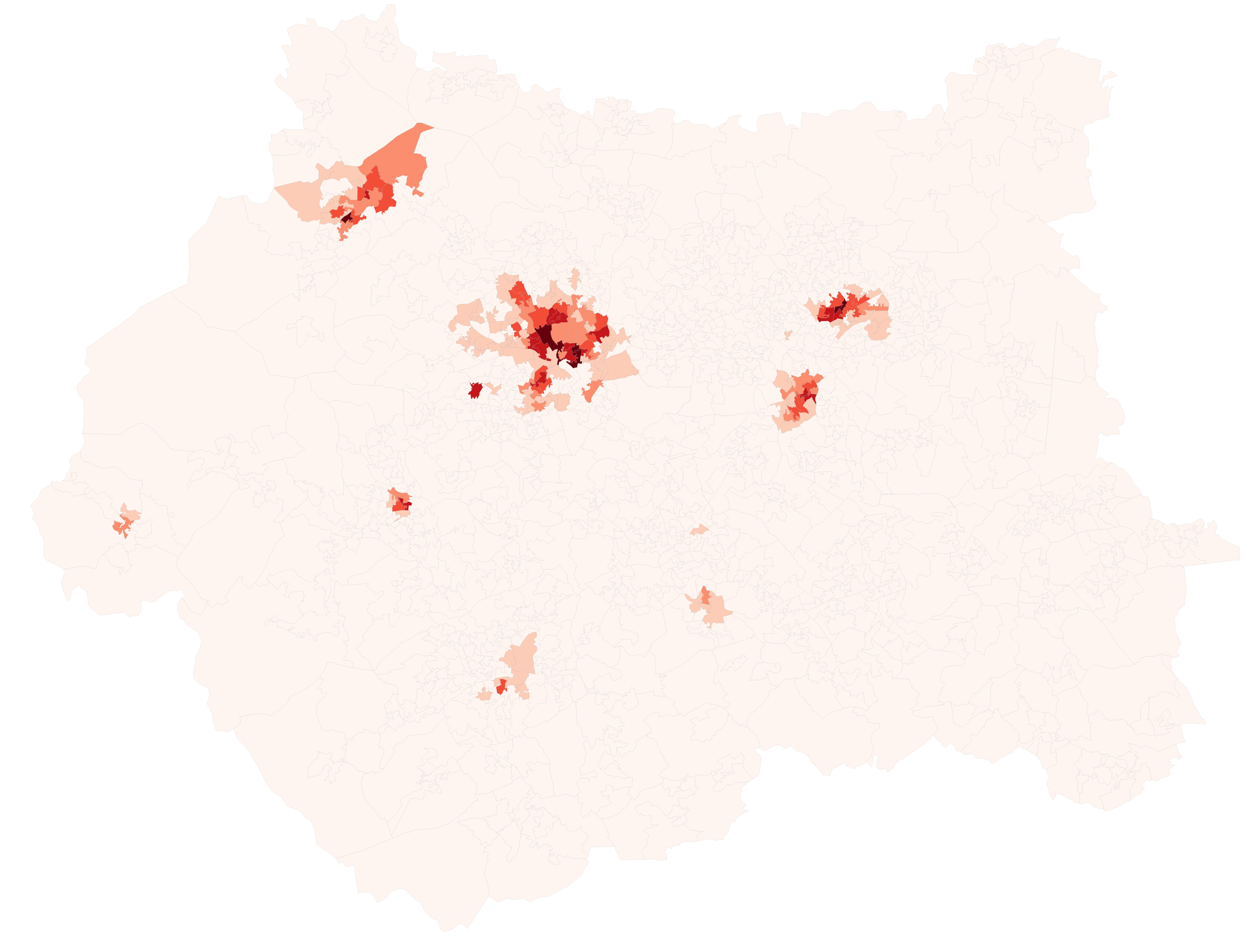
Asian-Bangladeshi

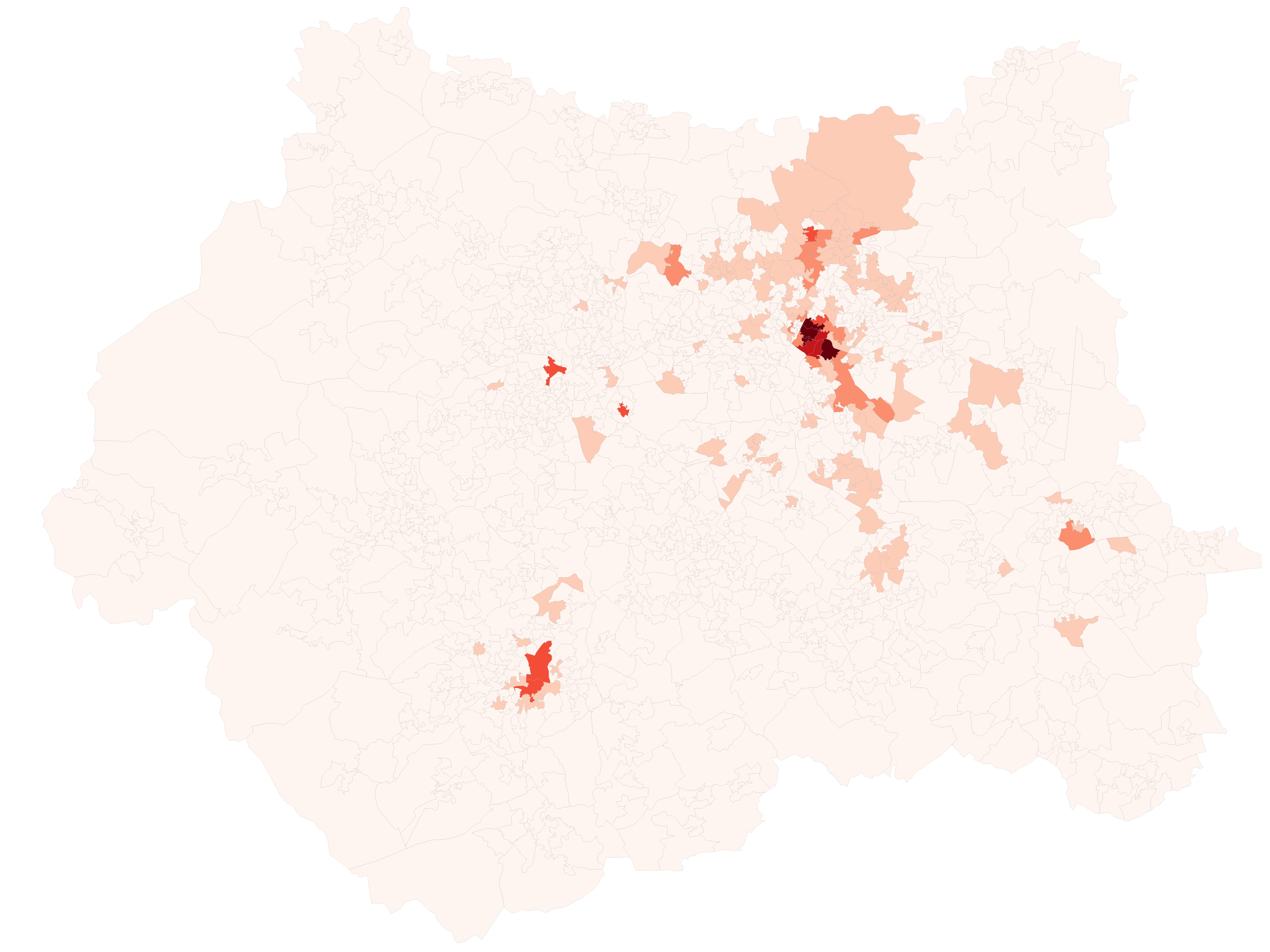
Asian-Chinese

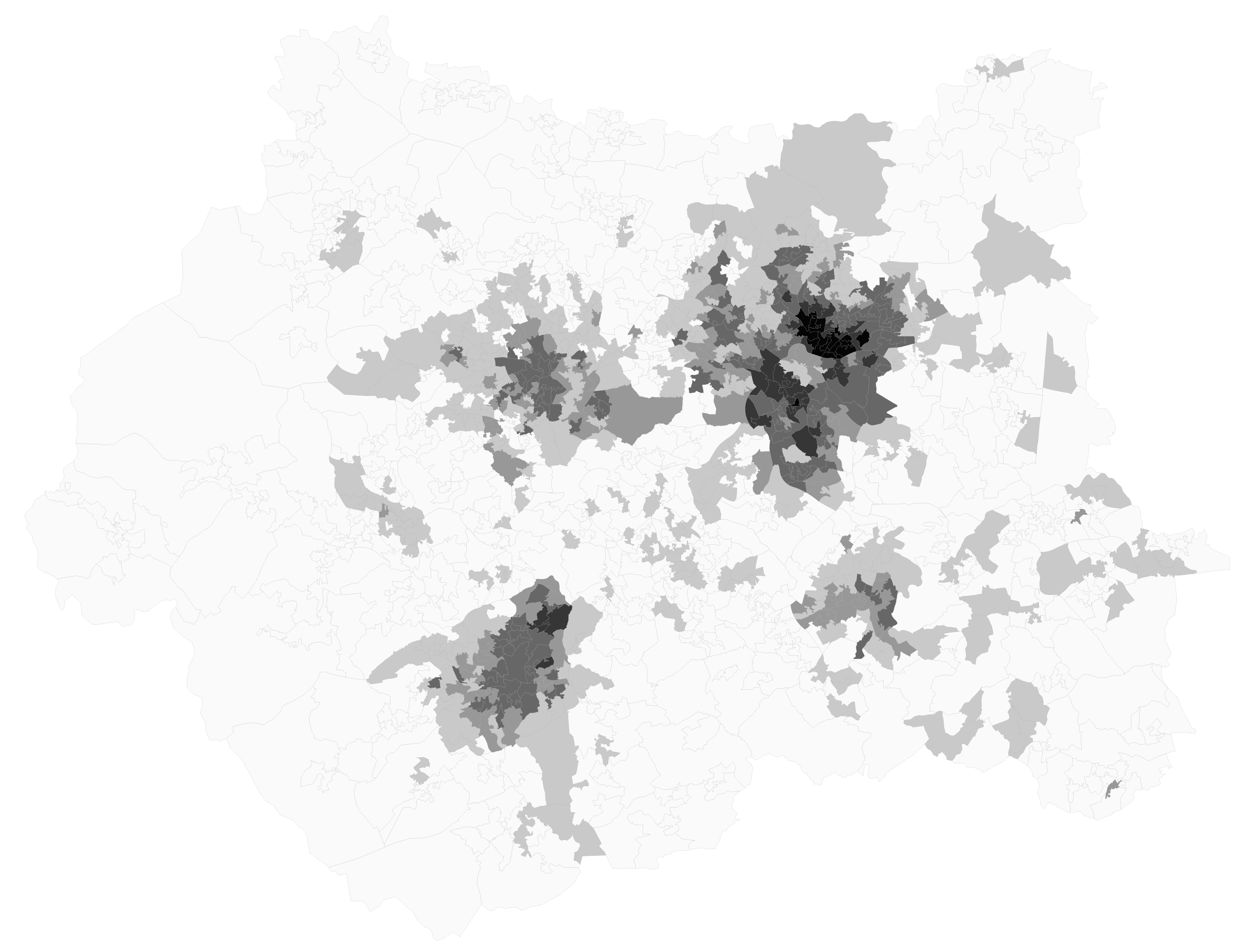
Black (2021)

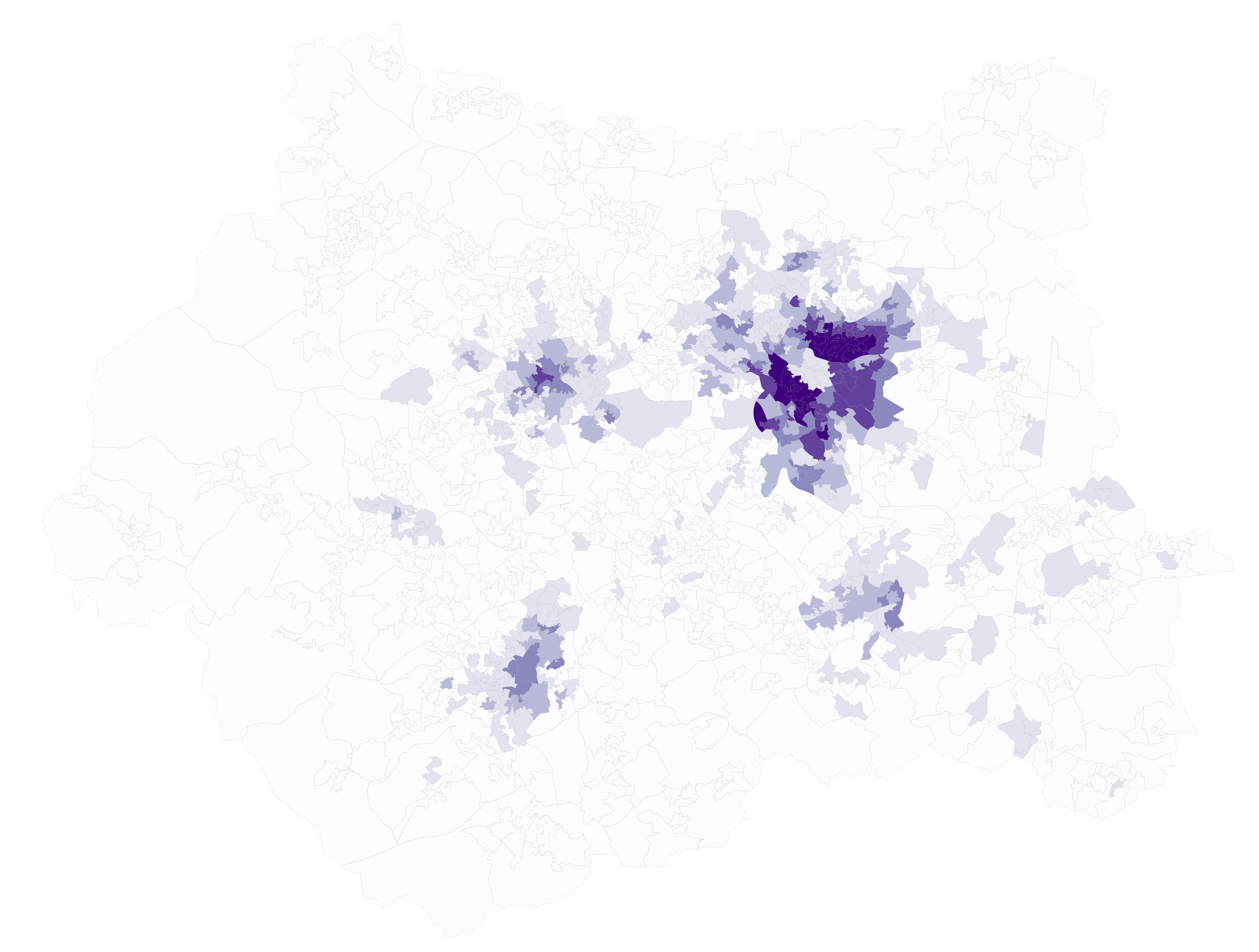
Black-African

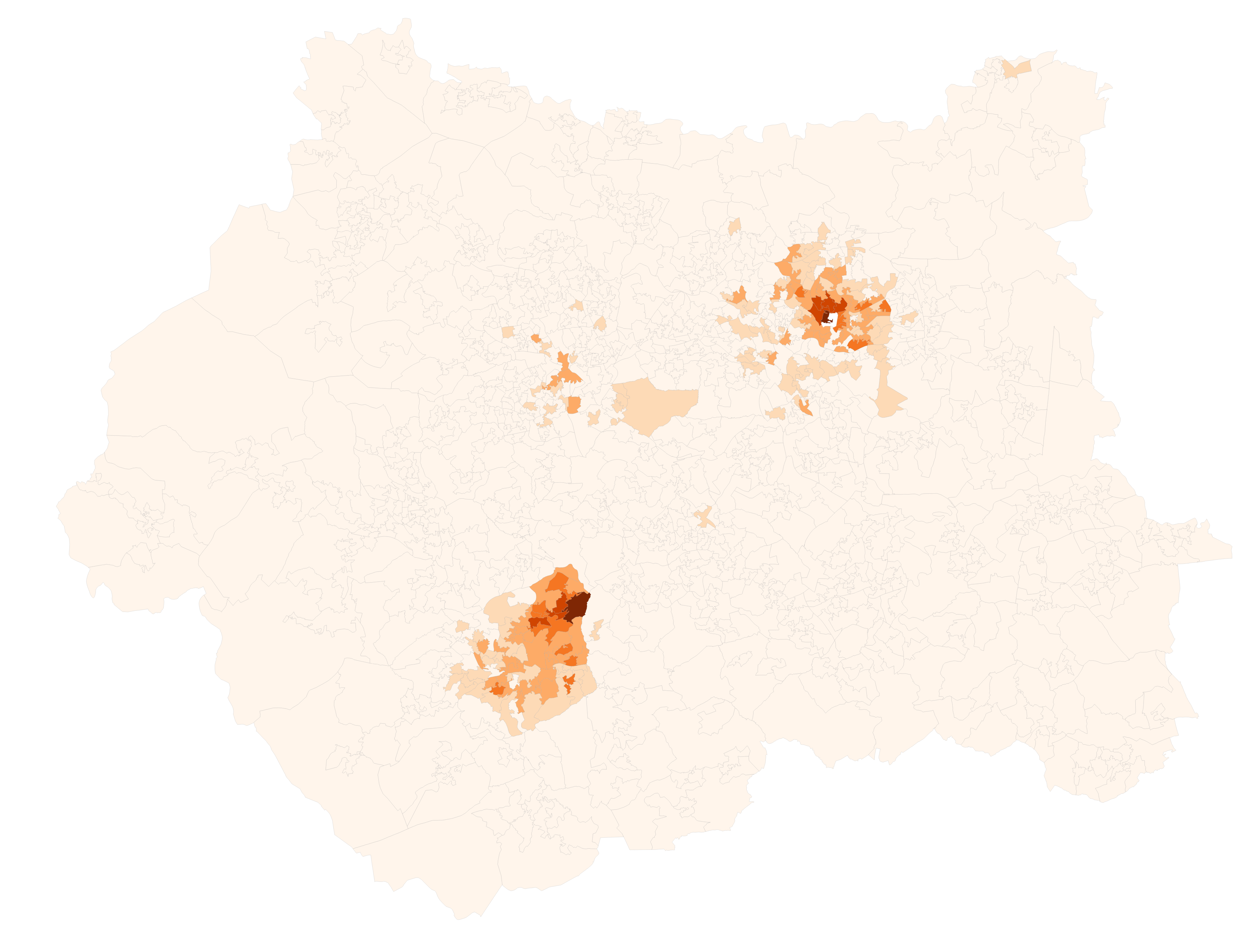
Black-Caribbean

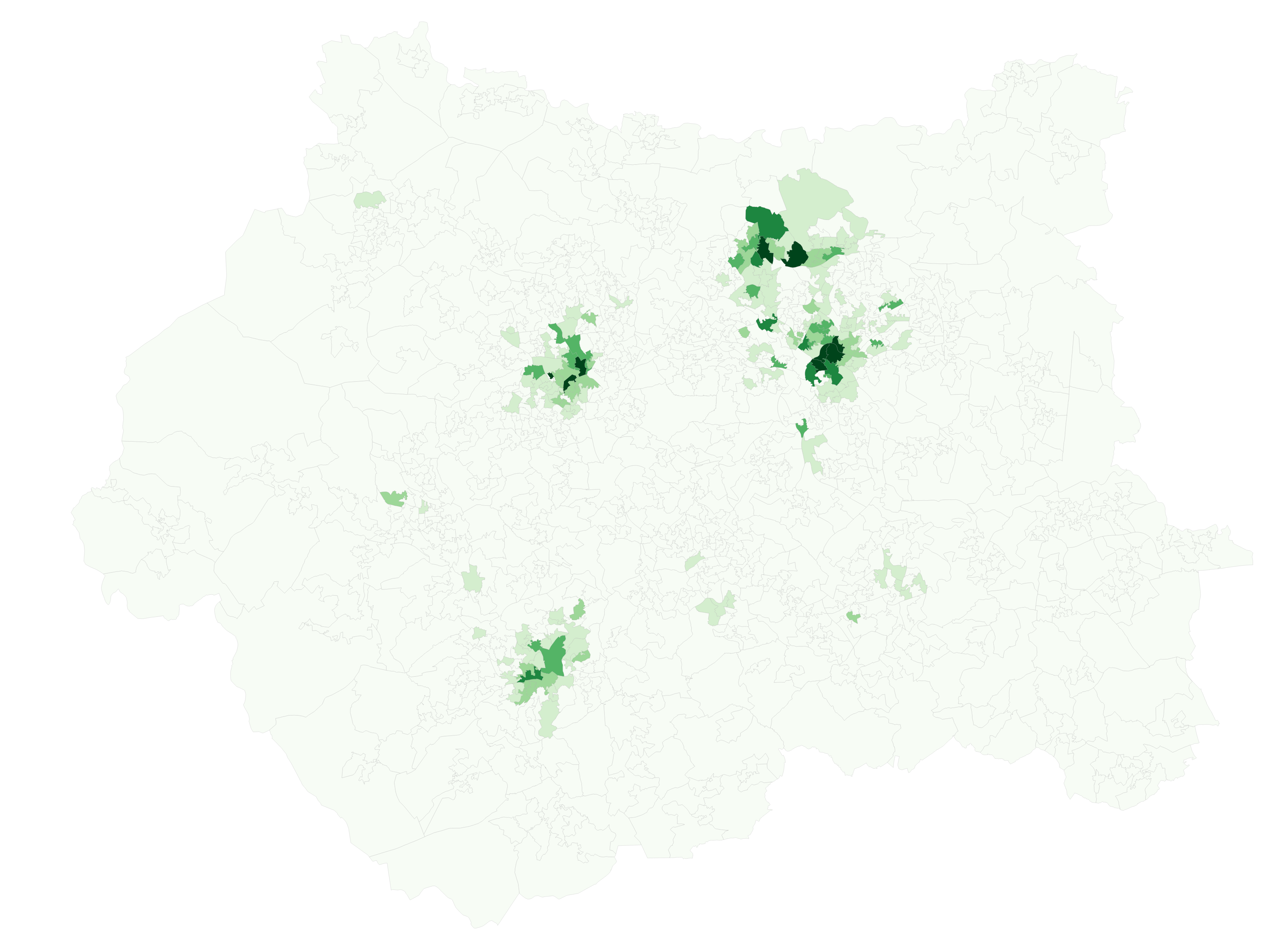
Other-Arab

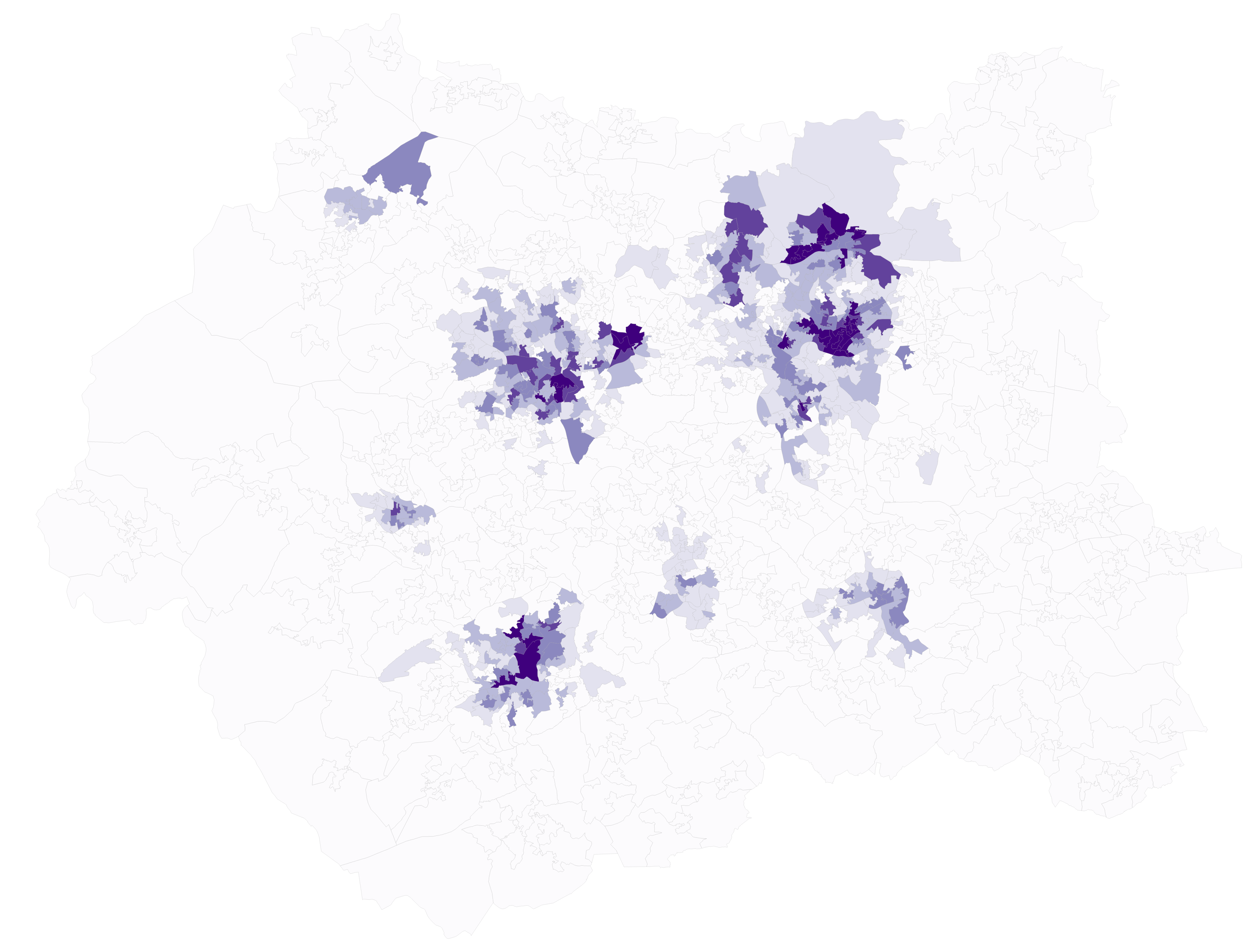
Other-Other ethnic group
Distribution of religions in West Yorkshire according to the 2011 census.
Christianity

Islam

Judaism

Hinduism

Sikhism

Buddhism

Other religion

No religion

== Economy ==
=== Industries ===
Leeds has since attracted investment from financial institutions, to become a recognised financial centre, with many banks, building societies and insurance companies having offices in the city. Wakefield has also attracted many service-based industries, in particular call centres. Two of the big four supermarkets are from West Yorkshire. Morrisons is based in Bradford, while Asda is based in Leeds.

West Yorkshire grew up around several industries. Wakefield, Castleford, Pontefract and South and East Leeds were traditional coal mining areas.

Wool

Bradford, Halifax and Huddersfield grew through the development of woollen mills. Leeds' traditional industry was the manufacturing of cloth while heavier engineering industries facilitated growth in South Leeds.

The Heavy Woollen District covered towns such as Dewsbury, Batley, Morley, Ossett, Cleckheaton and Heckmondwike. The woollen and cloth industries declined throughout the twentieth century.

Rhubarb

The Rhubarb Triangle is wholly in West Yorkshire and still produces the vegetable in considerable quantities. Twelve farmers who farm within the Rhubarb Triangle applied to have the name "Yorkshire forced rhubarb" added to the list of foods and drinks that have their names legally protected by the European Commission's Protected Food Name scheme. The application was successful and the farmers in the Rhubarb Triangle were awarded Protected Designation of Origin status (PDO) in February 2010. Food protected status accesses European funding to promote the product and legal backing against other products made outside the area using the name. Other protected names include Stilton cheese, Champagne and Parma Ham.

Coal

The last pit in West Yorkshire to close was Hay Royds Colliery at Denby Dale in 2012 after a flood.

=== Film and television productions ===
Several films and television series have been filmed in West Yorkshire's historic areas, particularly around the town of Halifax. For example, portions of the BBC television series Happy Valley were filmed in Huddersfield; in addition to exteriors, some of the studio filming was done at North Light Film Studios at Brookes Mill, Huddersfield. As well, interiors for the BBC's Jamaica Inn, for the BBC's Remember Me and for ITV series Black Work, were also filmed at the studios. More recently, many of the exteriors of the BBC series Jericho were filmed at the nearby Rockingstone Quarry and some interior work was done at North Light Film Studios.

=== Tourism ===
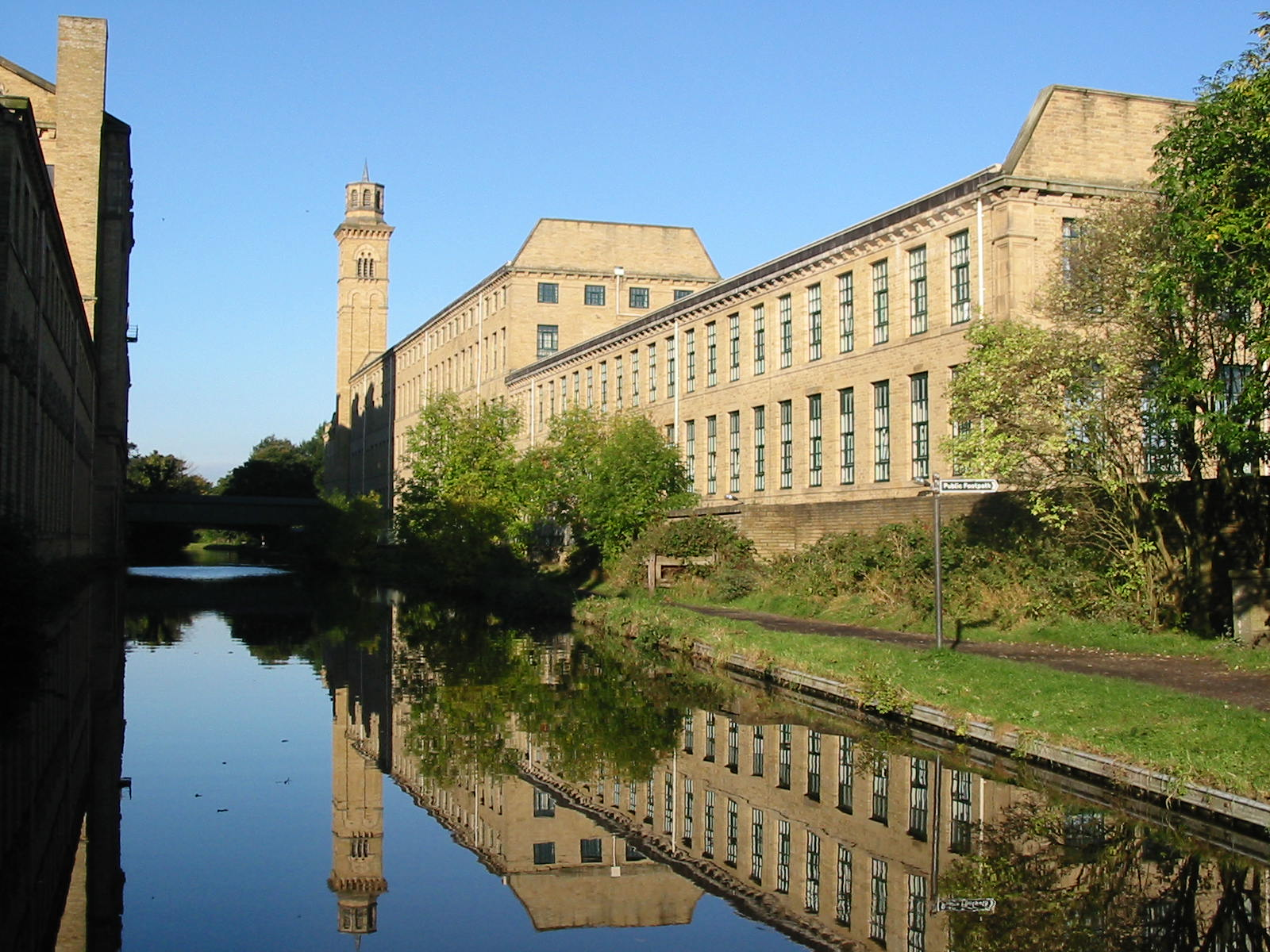
Titus Salt's mill in Saltaire, Shipley, is an UNESCO World Heritage Site.

Urban tourism include national and internationally significant sports stadiums, museums, theatre and galleries. The Royal Armouries is in Leeds, as is the Leeds Playhouse (formerly the West Yorkshire Playhouse), Opera North and The Grand Theatre. The First Direct Arena in Leeds seats around 15,000 people. Sheffield Arena is also popular, as are the Bradford Alhambra, St Georges Hall and the National Science and Media Museum in Bradford.

Leeds is the most popular shopping destination in West Yorkshire, and the wider region, with several notable retail destinations. Briggate and The Headrow are the most important shopping streets, while Trinity Leeds, Kirkgate Market (the biggest indoor market in Europe) and the White Rose Centre are regionally dominant shopping destinations. Victoria Leeds is nationally known for hosting many 'first outside of London' labels such as Harvey Nichols and Anthropologie.

Leeds is also a popular weekend destination for nightlife, with several famous bars and clubs across a variety of different districts. The city's gay village is the largest in Yorkshire.

A wide range of towns and cities are connected by rail to Leeds railway station, which is the busiest station in northern England and the main national gateway to West Yorkshire. The M62 motorway is the main east-west motorway in the county, connecting the largest towns and cities of West Yorkshire, while the M1 forms a key north-south axis from Leeds to Wakefield and beyond towards London.

Outside of the main cities, signposted walks follow rivers and the escarpment of the Pennines, which is scaled in meandering stages and tunnels by the recreational Leeds-Liverpool Canal and Rochdale Canal, navigable by barge, canoe or kayak. The Yorkshire Sculpture Park and The Hepworth in Wakefield are major national art attractions, while Haworth is visited for being the home of the Bronte Sisters. Ilkley, Otley, Hebden Bridge and Holmfirth are popular smaller towns featuring farmer's markets, breweries, tea rooms, stately homes and are popular with hikers.

== Transport ==
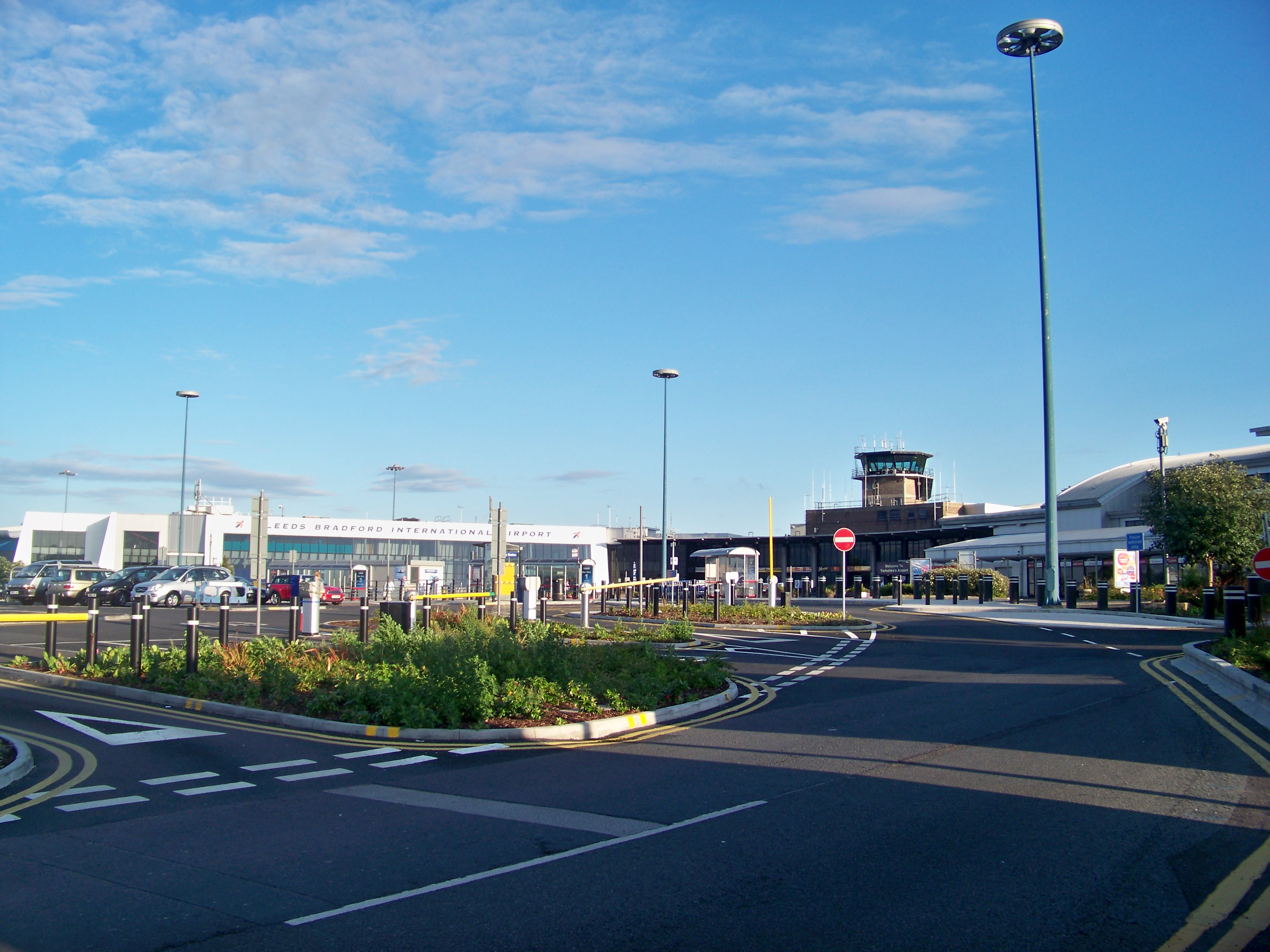
Leeds Bradford Airport

Major national road transport routes pass through West Yorkshire, principally the M62, M1, and A1(M). The regional rail network is centred on Leeds, with long-distance intercity services to destinations across Great Britain provided by LNER, CrossCountry, and TransPennine Express.. Most regional and local train services along the Airedale, Wharfedale, Calder Valley, Huddersfield, Wakefield, and Pontefract lines are provided by Northern. Open-access train operating company Grand Central also provides services from Bradford to London via Halifax.

Leeds Bradford Airport, located in Yeadon, is Yorkshire’s largest airport. Doncaster Sheffield Airport, formerly the other major passenger airport serving Yorkshire, closed in November 2022. Leeds Bradford Airport is served by Ryanair, Jet2.com, TUI, Wizz Air, Aer Lingus, Aurigny, KLM, SunExpress, and EasyJet, with easyJet due to end its services from the airport in January 2027. In 2024, Leeds Bradford Airport served more than 4.24 million passengers.

Towards the end of her first mayoral term in West Yorkshire, Tracy Brabin announced her decision to improve bus services in the region by introducing bus franchising rather than continuing with an enhanced partnership under the existing privatised model. In May 2025, the Weaver Network brand was unveiled as the future identity for public transport in West Yorkshire, progressively replacing the West Yorkshire Metro brand ahead of the launch of franchised bus services. The first two bus operating contracts for the new Weaver Network were awarded in September 2026 to FirstGroup, covering Huddersfield and parts of Leeds, and Transdev Blazefield, covering Dewsbury.

In October 2021, £830 million of funding was announced for the West Yorkshire Combined Authority through the City Region Sustainable Transport Settlement, including funding to develop mass transit proposals for the region. Consultation was undertaken between July and September 2024 on proposed tram routes linking Bradford and Leeds, and St. James Hospital, central Leeds and White Rose Shopping Centre. Following a review by the National Infrastructure and Service Transformation Authority, the programme was moved to a more sequential approach intended to reduce delivery risk, contributing to a delay in the expected timetable for the scheme.

== Sport ==
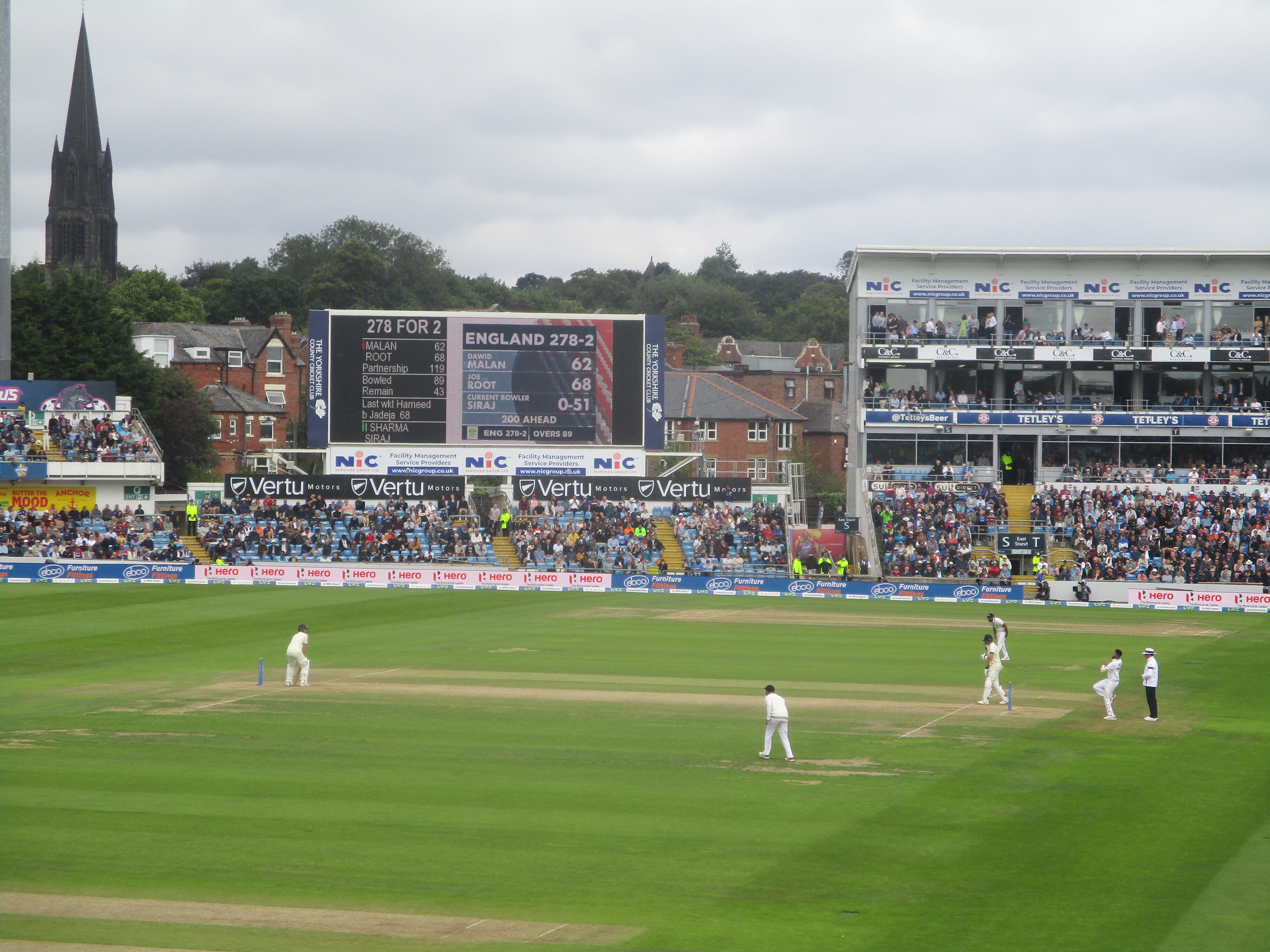
Headingley Cricket Ground in 2021

Major football clubs in West Yorkshire include Leeds United, Huddersfield Town, and Bradford City.

Rugby league is also big in West Yorkshire. The teams who are, or have been, in the Super League are Bradford Bulls, Castleford Tigers, Halifax Panthers, Huddersfield Giants, Leeds Rhinos, and Wakefield Trinity. Other rugby league clubs in West Yorkshire include Batley Bulldogs, Dewsbury Rams, Featherstone Rovers, Hunslet Hawks and Keighley Cougars. Any combination of these teams playing against each other would be called a West Yorkshire derby even if the rivalry is not as great as other rivalries between teams in the area. The main rugby union club in the county is Yorkshire Carnegie.

Elland Road is the largest stadium in the area, hosting Leeds United. The Headingley Stadium, a stadium complex also in Leeds, consists of a cricket and a rugby ground. The cricket ground is home of the Yorkshire County Cricket Club and the rugby ground is home to Leeds Rhinos. In Huddersfield, the John Smith's Stadium is home to Huddersfield Town and Huddersfield Giants. In Bradford, Valley Parade is the home of Bradford City, whereas the Odsal Stadium is the home of the Bradford Bulls. Other stadiums include Wheldon Road (Castleford), The Shay (Halifax), Belle Vue (Wakefield), Mount Pleasant (Batley), Crown Flatt (Dewsbury), Post Office Road (Featherstone), John Charles Centre for Sport (Hunslet) and Cougar Park (Keighley).

There are two racecourses in West Yorkshire: Pontefract and Wetherby.

West Yorkshire also used to host regular speedway meetings, having the Halifax Dukes and the Bradford Dukes teams. Odsal Stadium used to host BriSCA stock cars. Leeds has a hill climb event at Harewood speed Hillclimb.

== Places of interest ==
=== Historic environment ===
Key
	Abbey/Priory/Cathedral
Accessible open space	Accessible open space
	Amusement/Theme Park
	Castle
Country Park	Country Park
	English Heritage
	Forestry Commission
Heritage railway	Heritage railway
Historic house	Historic House
Places of Worship	Places of Worship
Museum (free) Museum	Museum (free/not free)
National Trust	National Trust
	Theatre
	Zoo

- Bretton Hall
- Cartwright Hall
- Cliffe Hall, also known as Cliffe Castle, Keighley
- East Riddlesden Hall
- Esholt Hall, Esholt
- Firsby Hall
- Harewood House
- Kershaw House
- Keighley & Worth Valley Railway
- Kirklees Hall/Priory
- Kirkstall Abbey
- Roman Lagentium (Castleford)
- Ledston Hall, Ledston
- Linthwaite Hall, Linthwaite
- Linton Hall
- Lister Park, Bradford
- Lotherton Hall
- Middleton Railway, the world's oldest steam railway
- Nostell Priory
- Oakwell Hall
- Oulton Hall, Oulton
- Piece Hall, Halifax
- Pontefract Castle
- Pontefract Priory, Pontefract
- Queen's Park, Castleford
- Roundhay Park Leeds
- Saltaire, a UNESCO World Heritage Site
- Sandal Castle
- Scarcroft Watermill, Scarcroft
- Shelley Hall, Shelley
- Shibden Hall
- Shipley Glen Tramway
- Tong Hall, Tong
- Wetherby Castle, Wetherby

=== Museums ===
- Abbey House Museum, Leeds
- Armley Mills Industrial Museum, Leeds
- Bagshaw Museum, Batley
- Bankfield Museum, Halifax
- Bradford Industrial Museum, Eccleshill/Fagley, Bradford
- Brontë Parsonage Museum, Haworth
- Colne Valley Museum, Golcar, Huddersfield
- Eureka, Halifax
- Leeds City Museum, Leeds
- National Coal Mining Museum for England Overton, Wakefield
- National Media Museum, Bradford
- Pennine Farm Museum, Ripponden, Halifax
- Pontefract Museum
- Royal Armouries Museum, Leeds
- Thackray Museum, Leeds
- The Hepworth Wakefield
- Thwaite Mills, Leeds
- Tolson Museum, Dalton, Huddersfield
- Wakefield Museum, Wakefield
- West Yorkshire Folk Museum, Shibden Hall, Halifax
- Yorkshire Sculpture Park, West Bretton, Wakefield

=== Natural environment ===
- Emley Moor, site of the tallest self-supporting structure in the UK (a TV mast)
- Harewood Estate – Leeds Country Way public footpath runs through the estate, landscaped gardens and home to Red Kites amongst many other birds
- Ilkley Moor, part of Rombalds Moor
- New Swillington Ings Nature Reserve
- Otley Chevin – extensive wooded parkland on high ground with extensive views North over Wharfedale and South as far as the Peak District
- RSPB Fairburn Ings and St Aidan's – wetland centres for birds
- Seckar Woods LNR, a Local Nature Reserve
- Walton Hall, West Yorkshire, home of naturalist Charles Waterton and the world's first nature reserve

=== Waterways ===
- Scammonden Reservoir, Deanhead Reservoir – both in the moors near Ripponden
- River Aire, River Calder, River Hebble, River Spen, River Worth
- Aire and Calder Navigation
- Calder and Hebble Navigation
- Huddersfield Broad Canal
- Huddersfield Narrow Canal, Standedge Tunnel
- Leeds and Liverpool Canal
- Rochdale Canal

== See also ==
- List of Lord Lieutenants of West Yorkshire
- List of High Sheriffs of West Yorkshire
- The Kingdom of Elmet
- West Yorkshire Urban Area
- West Yorkshire Metropolitan Ambulance Service
- West Yorkshire Regiment (The Prince of Wales's Own)
- List of ceremonial counties in England by gross value added
- Listed buildings in West Yorkshire

== Sources ==
- Beckett, J. V. (2005), City status in the British Isles,1830–2002, Ashgate Publishing, ISBN 0-7546-5067-7
