= Economy of Leeds =

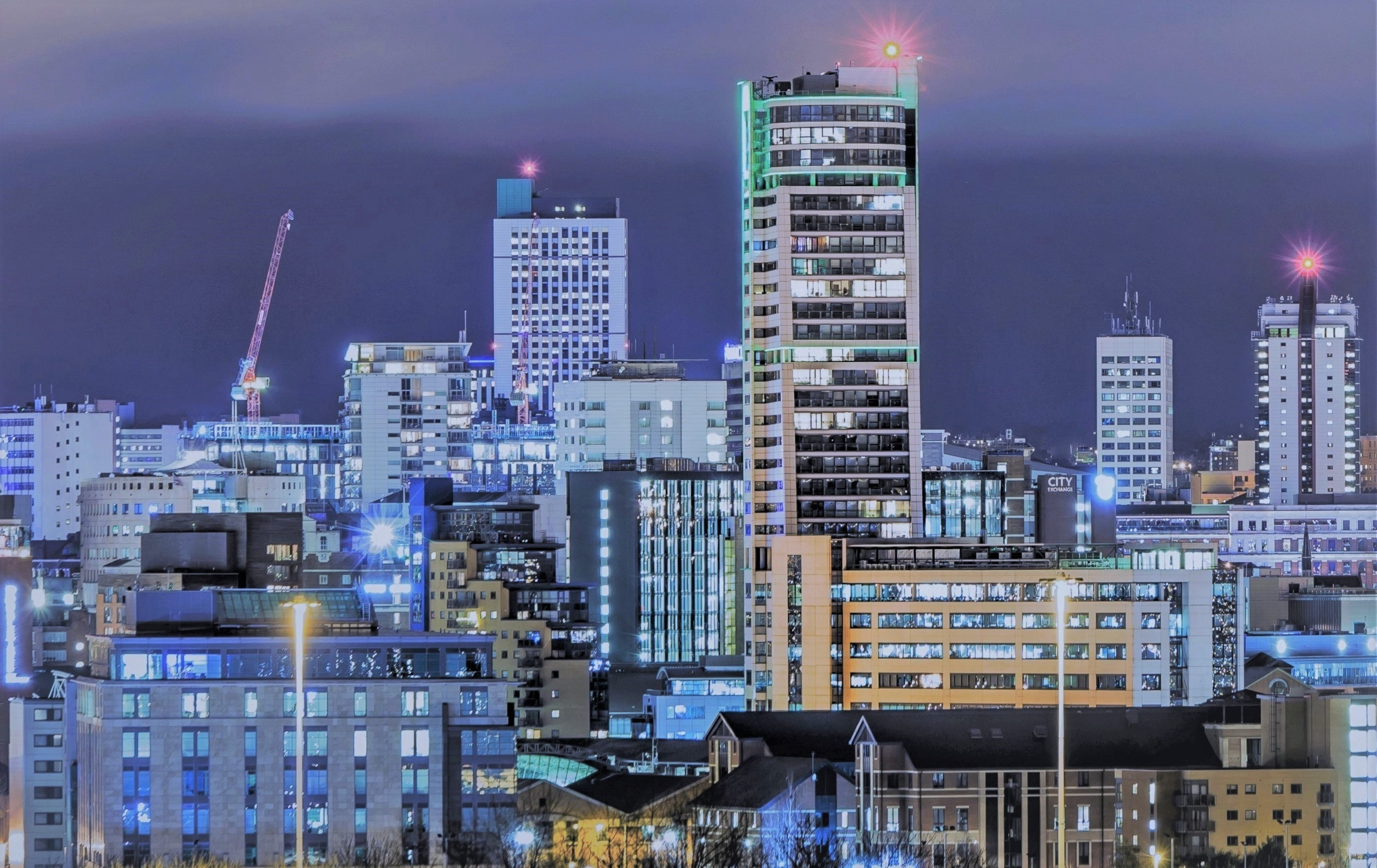
- Skyline of Leeds at night

Statistics
- Population: 829,413 (2023)
- GDP: £39.3 billion (2023)
- GDP per capita: £47,411 (2023)

The economy of Leeds is the most diverse economy of all the UK's main employment centres and has seen the fastest rate of private-sector jobs growth of any UK city and has the highest ratio of public to private sector jobs of all the UK's Core Cities. Leeds has the third-largest jobs total by local authority area with 480,000 in employment and self-employment at the beginning of 2015.

Leeds is the largest legal and financial centre in England outside of London, and third largest in the UK after Edinburgh, and in 2011 its financial and insurance services industry was worth £2.1 billion. with more than 30 national and international banks located in the city.

Leeds is also the UK's third largest manufacturing centre with around 1,800 firms and 39,000 employees, Leeds manufacturing firms account for 8.8% of total employment in the city. The largest sub-sectors are engineering, printing and publishing, food and drink, chemicals and medical technology. Leeds is also ranked as a gamma world city by the Globalization and World Cities Research Network; Over the next ten years, the economy is forecast to grow by 25% with financial and business services set to generate over half of GVA growth over that period with finance and business services accounting for 38% of total output. Other key sectors include retail, leisure and the visitor economy, construction, manufacturing and the creative and digital industries.

Leeds' growth has helped to change the economic geography of the United Kingdom, as Leeds is now the largest financial centres in Britain outside the capital. New tertiary industries such as retail, call centres, offices and media have contributed to a high rate of economic growth since the early 1990s. Leeds was successful in becoming the first British city to have full broadband and digital coverage during the dot-com bubble, enabling it to become one of the key hubs in the emerging new media sector. Companies such as Freeserve, Energis, Sportal, TEAMtalk, Contactmusic.com and Ananova emerged from Leeds to dominate the UK internet industry. Now, over 33% of the UK's internet traffic passes through Leeds, making it one of the most important regional internet centres in the UK.

== Economic indices ==
Below is a collection of economic indices featuring Leeds. It is important to remember that while useful, surveys and indicators have limitations, and are at times subjective and incomplete. For example, no complete list of factors affecting quality of life can be created, and the way people weight these factors differs.

=== Quality of life ===
- 5th in the UK for quality of life (2013), according to a rating of the UK's 12 largest cities. The cities were assessed on a range of factors including property market activity, rental costs, salary levels, disposable income growth, cost of living, unemployment rates and life satisfaction.
- 4th most deprived local authority in England in terms of income and employment according to the 2010 English Indices of Deprivation.
- 15th in the UK amongst big cities for 'cycle-friendliness' (2010).

=== Business ===
Cushman & Wakefield European Cities Monitor (2010) - A survey based on the views of 500 European businesses of Europe's leading business cities.

- Overall 23rd in Europe, 4th in the UK after London, Manchester and Birmingham, best city to locate a business based on factors which are disaggregated below.
- 16th in Europe, 4th in the UK after London, Birmingham and Manchester, for ease of access to markets, customers or clients.
- 17th in Europe, 4th in the UK after London, Manchester and Birmingham, for best qualified staff.
- 20th in Europe, 4th in the UK after London, Manchester and Birmingham, for quality of telecommunications.
- 18th in Europe, 4th in the UK after London, Manchester and Birmingham, for external transport links to other cities and internationally.
- 1st in Europe and the UK in terms of value for money of office space.
- 10th in Europe, 1st= in the UK with Glasgow, for cost of staff.
- 7th in Europe, 3rd in the UK after Manchester and Birmingham, for availability of office space.
- 21st in Europe, 5th in the UK after London, Manchester, Glasgow and Birmingham, for climate governments create for businesses.
- 24th in Europe, 4th in the UK after London, Birmingham and Manchester, in terms of languages spoken.
- 15th in Europe, 3rd in the UK after London, and Manchester for ease of travelling around within the city.

In the same survey, when asked how well companies know each of the cities as a business location, 19% said they were familiar with Leeds as a business location. This was the 6th highest in the UK after London (82%), Manchester (33%), Birmingham (28%), Edinburgh (25%) and Glasgow (21%).

== GVA ==
GVA for Leeds 2002-2012
| Year | GVA (£million) | Growth (%) |
|---|---|---|
| 2002 | 13,480 | ▲7.4% |
| 2003 | 14,495 | ▲7.5% |
| 2004 | 15,629 | ▲7.8% |
| 2005 | 16,729 | ▲7.0% |
| 2006 | 17,651 | ▲5.5% |
| 2007 | 18,807 | ▲6.5% |
| 2008 | 19,263 | ▲2.4% |
| 2009 | 18,110 | ▼6.0% |
| 2010 | 18,126 | ▲0.1% |
| 2011 | 18,838 | ▲3.9% |
| 2012 | 18,767 | ▼0.4% |

In 2012, Leeds' GVA was £18.8bn ($33.2bn) accounting for 1.4% of UK GVA. It also accounts for 44% of the GVA of West Yorkshire, and 20% of the GVA of Yorkshire and Humber. Leeds is by far the largest centre of economic activity in the Yorkshire and Humber region: it is 80% higher than Sheffield's and 117% higher than Bradford's, for example. Compared with other major UK cities and conurbations, its GVA is exceeded only by London (comprising five NUTS 3 areas - £309.3bn), Greater Manchester South (£34.8bn) and Birmingham (£21.2bn).

In 2012, the economy of Leeds remained 2.6% behind its peak output in 2008.

Over the last 10 years, GVA growth in Leeds was marginally lower than West Yorkshire, but equal to the region as a whole. Growth was also lower than the UK as a whole. Over the last 5 years, again it was lower in these three areas.

Total GVA and GVA per head, 2012
| Area | GVA (£million) | Annual GVA growth (%) | GVA (£ per head) | GVA per head growth (%)' |
|---|---|---|---|---|
| Leeds | 18,767 | ▼0.4% | 24,770 | ▼1.3% |
| West Yorkshire | 42,907 | ▲1.3% | 19,149 | ▲0.7% |
| Core Cities average^{1} | 16,036 | ▲2.6% | 22,267 | ▲1.6% |

^{1}excluding Leeds, included Birmingham, Bristol, Liverpool, Manchester, Newcastle, Nottingham and Sheffield

=== Productivity ===
GVA per employee in Leeds is estimated to be £46,900 per employee in 2012. It is higher than other areas in the region, but lower than London. It was higher than all other NUTS 3 areas except Edinburgh (£54,100). Growth between 2007 and 2012 was 7% - equal 9th of all comparable 18 NUTS 3 areas.

GVA per employee, 2011
| Area | GVA per worker (£) | GVA per worker % change 2006-11 |
|---|---|---|
| Leeds | 43,000 | ▲8% |
| Core Cities average^{2} | 32,700 | ▲11.7% |

^{2}excluding Leeds, included Birmingham, Bristol, Liverpool, Manchester, Newcastle, Nottingham and Sheffield

=== GVA by sector ===
Industry breakdown, 2011
| Sector | Value (£ millions) | Growth 2010-11 (%) | % of total |
|---|---|---|---|
| Agriculture, forestry and fishing | 41 | ▲7.9 | 0.2 |
| Production | 2,217 | ▼2.2 | 11.8 |
| of which manufacturing | 1,532 | ▼0.1 | 8.1 |
| Construction | 1,065 | ▲5.0 | 5.7 |
| Distribution; transport; accommodation and food | 3,028 | ▲6.5 | 16.1 |
| Information and communication | 1,221 | ▲7.3 | 6.5 |
| Financial and insurance services | 2,094 | ▼13.4 | 11.1 |
| Real estate activities | 2,421 | ▲23.5 | 12.9 |
| Business service activities | 2,570 | ▲7.9 | 13.6 |
| Public administration, education and health | 3,555 | ▲1.7 | 18.9 |
| Other services and household activities | 627 | ▲9.6 | 3.3 |
| Total | 18,838 | ▲3.9 | |

== Employment, welfare and education ==
The 2012 mid-year estimate for the population of Leeds was 757,700, and growth between 2011 and 2012 was estimated to be 0.93%, the second lowest of the Core Cities ahead of Liverpool (0.83%).

=== Employment ===
Employment Statistics (12 July – 13 June)
| Age 16-64 | Leeds (%) | Yorkshire and The Humber (%) | Great Britain (%) |
| Economically active | 76.4 | 76.9 | 77.3 |
| In employment | 68.8 | 69.7 | 71.1 |
| Unemployed | 9.6 | 9.2 | 7.8 |
| % of economically active who are self-employed | 7.5 | 8.2 | 9.5 |

=== Earnings ===
Earnings by residence^{1} 2013
| Full-time workers | Leeds (£) | Yorkshire and the Humber (£) | Great Britain (£) |
| Weekly pay (all workers) | 498.4 | 479.1 | 518.1 |
| Male | 533.6 | 519.4 | 558.8 |
| Female | 459.5 | 414.5 | 459.8 |
| Gender pay gap | 13.9% | 20.2% | 17.7% |
| Hourly pay (all workers) | 12.83 | 12.00 | 13.18 |
| Male | 13.18 | 12.52 | 13.80 |
| Female | 12.39 | 11.06 | 12.27 |
| Gender pay gap | 6.0% | 11.7% | 11.1% |

^{1}Median earnings in pounds for employees living in Leeds.

Earnings by workplace^{2} 2013
| Full-time workers | Leeds (£) | Yorkshire and The Humber (£) | Great Britain (£) |
| Weekly pay (all workers) | 502.1 | 479.1 | 517.8 |
| Male | 534.7 | 517.5 | 558.3 |
| Female | 463.6 | 416.3 | 459.6 |
| Gender pay gap | 13.3% | 19.6% | 17.7% |
| Hourly pay (All workers) | 12.86 | 12.00 | 13.17 |
| Male | 13.13 | 12.50 | 13.80 |
| Female | 12.46 | 11.15 | 12.27 |
| Gender pay gap | 5.1% | 10.8% | 11.1% |

^{2}Median earnings in pounds for employees working in Leeds.

=== Education ===
General Certificate of Secondary Education (GCSE) 2012
| | Leeds (%) | England (%) |
| Pupils achieving 5+ GCSEs, A*-C | 84.1 | 81.8 |
| Pupils achieving 5+ GCSEs, A*-C with English and Maths | 55.0 | 59.4 |
| Pupils achieving no GCSEs | 0.7 | 0.5 |

Qualifications 2012
| Level | Leeds (%) | Yorkshire and The Humber (%) | Great Britain (%) |
| NVQ4 and above | 35.1 | 29.7 | 34.4 |
| NVQ3 and above | 57.8 | 51.5 | 55.1 |
| NVQ2 and above | 70.5 | 68.7 | 71.8 |
| NVQ1 and above | 83.3 | 81.6 | 84.0 |
| Other qualifications | 6.6 | 6.9 | 6.3 |
| No qualifications | 10.2 | 11.5 | 9.7 |

== Head offices ==
Asda has its head office in the Asda House in Leeds. Jet2.com, an airline, has its head office on the grounds of Leeds Bradford Airport in Yeadon, City of Leeds. GHD have their headquarters at Bridgewater Place. Other companies to be headquartered in Leeds include First Direct, Republic, Premier Farnell, Ginetta Cars, Leeds Building Society and Yorkshire Bank. GDF Suez Energy UK, a subsidiary of GDF Suez, has its offices in Leeds.

== Manufacturing ==
Leeds has nearly 1,800 companies engaged in a diverse range of manufacturing activities, including specialised engineering, print, food and drink manufacture, chemicals and medical technology. Employing well over 144,200 people, the sector generates 10.8% of Leeds’ total output of over £15 billion a year. Most Leeds manufacturing companies are small to medium-sized. Major companies include Siemens and Mitsubishi, ARLA foods and DairyCrest.

=== Vehicle production ===
Optare buses were made in Cross Gates until 2010 when production was moved to new facilities at Sherburn-in-Elmet. Ginetta sports cars are made in Garforth. Treves UK have a factory in Leeds as well as one at nearby Knaresborough manufacturing components for car interiors.

=== Food production ===
Food production makes up part of the Leeds manufacturing base. Arla Foods UK are based at Stourton, Northern Foods based at Cross Green and Goldenfry at Wetherby. Supercook were based in Leeds but have since also relocated to Sherburn-in-Elmet. Brewing has for sometime been prominent in Leeds. The Tetley's Brewery was until its closure in 2011 the main site for this, Carlsberg-Tetley's still have a distribution centre at Tingley. The Leeds Brewery still brew beer in Leeds as does the reopened Kirkstall Brewery (although not at the original site).

Unilever manufacture a variety of goods at their factory in the city's Whinmoor district.

=== Chemicals ===
The city's main chemical producer, Yorkshire Chemicals closed both its Hunslet and Kirkstall plants in the 2000s. Rhodia UK also closed their smaller chemical works in Wortley, demolition was approved in 2011. There remains however several chemical works within the city, including E Chem in Kirkstall, Clariant in Rawdon and Chemsol in Hunslet.

== Financial and professional services ==
Leeds is one of the largest business centres in the United Kingdom, around a quarter of a million people are employed in the financial and professional sector in the Leeds City Region with an output valued at £13 billion per year. Financial and professional services are largely based around the traditional business quarter in the city centre, as well as the newer area along the South bank of the River Aire. Many smaller legal and professional firms occupy the smaller Georgian office buildings around Park Square, while many banks and insurance underwriters are set around Park Row and East Parade. First Direct have their headquarters some distance from the main business districts in the industrial Stourton area.

Unlike many comparable Northern cities, Leeds had a mixed economy throughout the latter half of the 20th century and so did not suffer the same industrial decline as other cities. However, by the 21st century Leeds' economy went into economic decline following the Great Recession, and unlike comparable Northern cities, it is yet to recover economically. The service sector of the economy flourished in the 2000s, with legal, accounting, consultancy, banking, insurance and recruitment firms moving to the city. In 2002 it was estimated that 38,000 new jobs would be created in Leeds over the next ten years, and most would be in the financial services sector.

Companies with regional or national offices in Leeds, include KPMG, Norwich Union, First Direct, Lloyds Banking Group (Lloyds TSB), Lloyds Banking Group (HBOS), Allied Irish Bank, Royal Bank of Scotland, HSBC, Leeds Building Society, Alliance and Leicester, Yorkshire Bank, Zurich Financial Services and Direct Line. There are further financial institutions within the Leeds City Region with Yorkshire Building Society and Bradford and Bingley offices in Bradford and further HBOS offices in Halifax.

The Bank of England, who have their headquarters on Threadneedle Street in London, have their second offices on King Street in the heart of Leeds' business quarter. Both the University of Leeds and Leeds Metropolitan University have established business schools, their presence being supported by businesses in the city.

== Retail ==
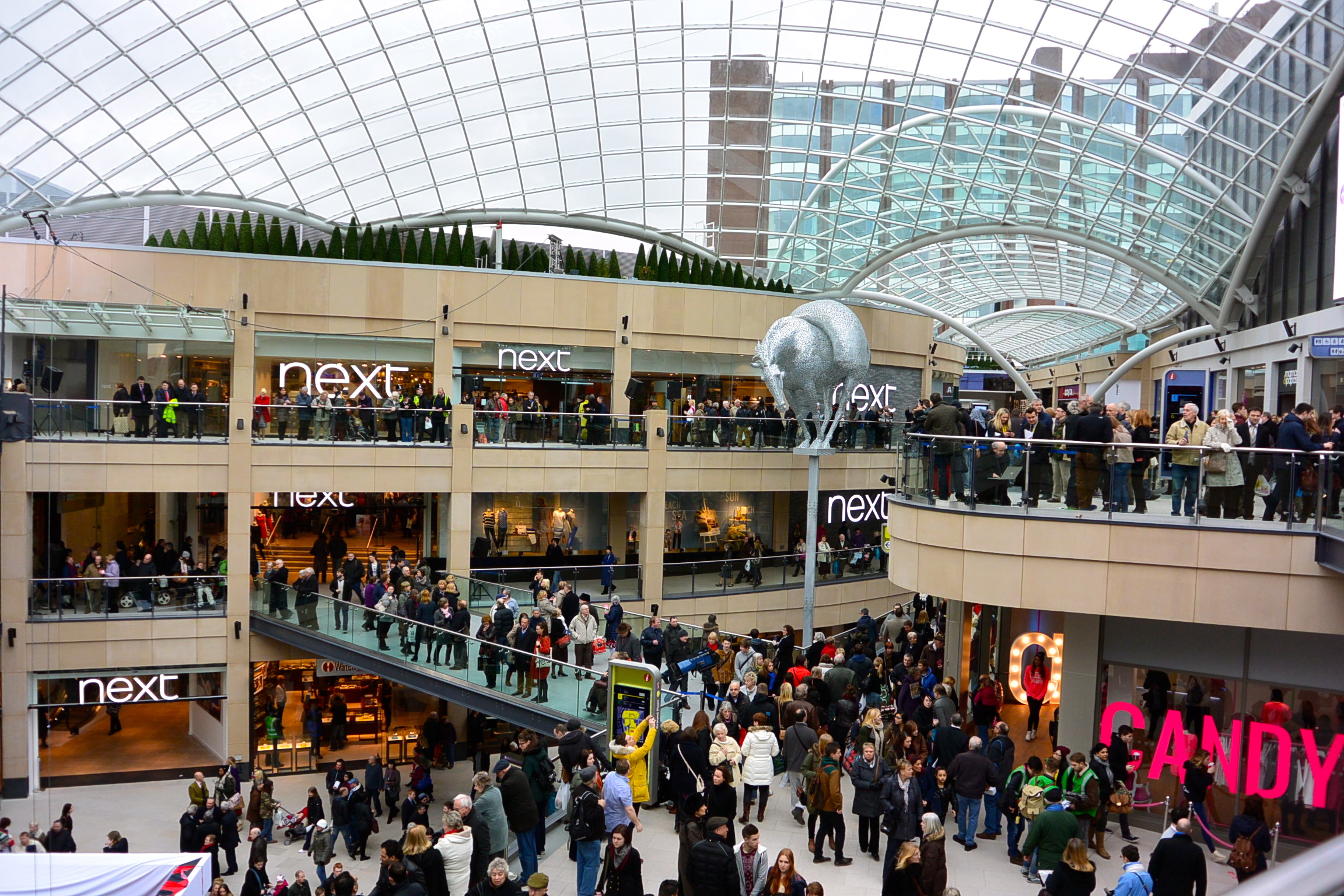
Trinity Leeds

Leeds is the 3rd largest retail destination in the UK outside of London and a major hub for retail in Europe. The range of shopping facilities, from individual one-off boutiques to large department stores such as Harvey Nichols and Louis Vuitton outlets, has greatly expanded the Leeds retail base. The Victoria Quarter, several existing arcades connected together by roofing the entirety of Queen Victoria Street with stained glass, is located off Briggate, Leeds' main shopping street.

In October 2016 Leeds' newest shopping centre Victoria Gate was opened, bringing a flagship John Lewis store to the city, along with a variety of luxury brands. Leeds features many stunning Victorian arcades, each with their own original features and unique charm: Thornton's Arcade, Queens Arcade, Grand Arcade and Central Arcade. Other popular shopping attractions include Leeds Kirkgate Market (founding place of the first Marks & Spencer and one of the largest indoor markets in Europe), Trinity Leeds, Crown Point Retail Park, The Light, The St John's Centre, The Merrion Centre Leeds, Birstall Retail Park and the White Rose Centre.

== Tourism ==
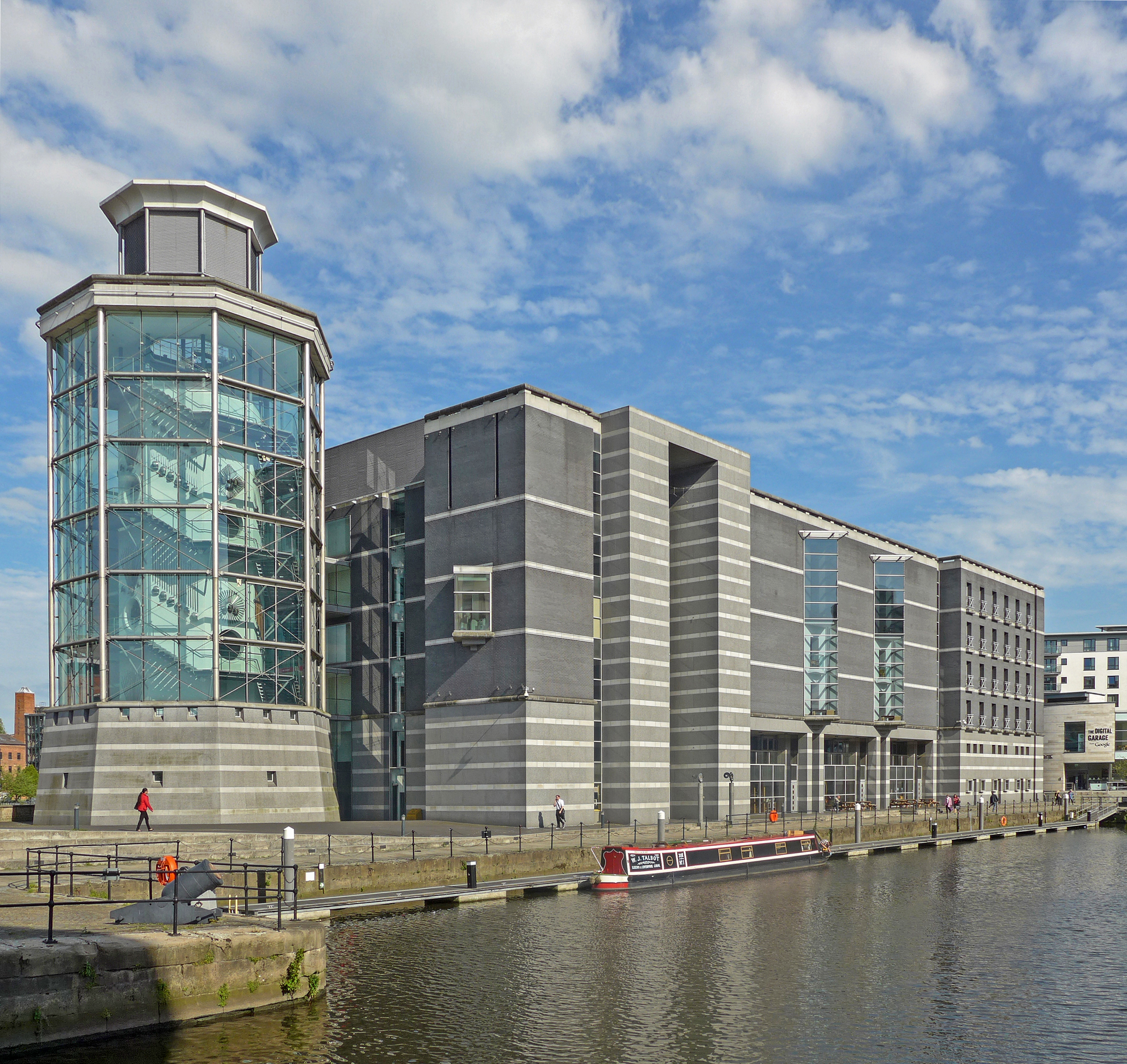
The Royal Armouries

Leeds has received several accolades in the field of tourism: it was named a Top 10 European Destination in 2017 by Lonely Planet; in the 2017 Condé Nast Traveler survey of readers, Leeds rated 6th among The 15 Best Cities in the UK for visitors. Earlier awards included being voted by Condé Nast Traveler magazine Readers' Awards as the "UK's favourite city" in 2004, "best English city to visit outside London" in 2005, and also "visitor city of the year" by The Good Britain Guide in 2005.

Situated close to the UK's geographical centre, the city benefits from good transport connections with the M1 running from Leeds to London, the M62 connecting Leeds with Manchester and the seaport cities of Hull and Liverpool, and the A1(M) for linking to the north. Leeds Bradford Airport is a rapidly growing regional UK airport, with an 87 per cent growth in terminal passenger numbers in the last five years. Over 450 weekly flights connect the city to over 70 major European business and holiday destinations.

Tourism in Leeds is estimated to support over 20,000 full-time equivalent jobs, and on average Leeds attracts around 1.5 million people annually who stay overnight, plus a further 10 million who visit on day trips. In 2009 Leeds was the 8th most visited city in England by UK visitors and the 13th most visited city by overseas visitors. Visitors to the city bring nearly £735 million into the local economy each year. Major national and regional attractions include the Royal Armouries Museum, Leeds Art Gallery, the Henry Moore Institute and the West Yorkshire Playhouse. Leeds is also the only city outside London to have both its own opera and ballet companies – Opera North and Northern Ballet Theatre, both internationally renowned.

By 2016, Leeds received 27.29 million leisure tourist visits generating over £1.6bn for the city, according to data from a STEAM survey. That was a 15.9% increase in revenue over 2015. A 9.7% increase in visits had been recorded since 2013. The industry supported over 19,000 full time equivalent jobs in 2016.

== Infrastructure ==
Leeds is situated on the M1, the M62 and the A1(M) motorway connecting it with cities to the north, south, east and west. Leeds railway station is one of Network Rail's 20 principal stations and has rail links to London, Birmingham, Manchester, Liverpool, Glasgow, Edinburgh and other major cities.

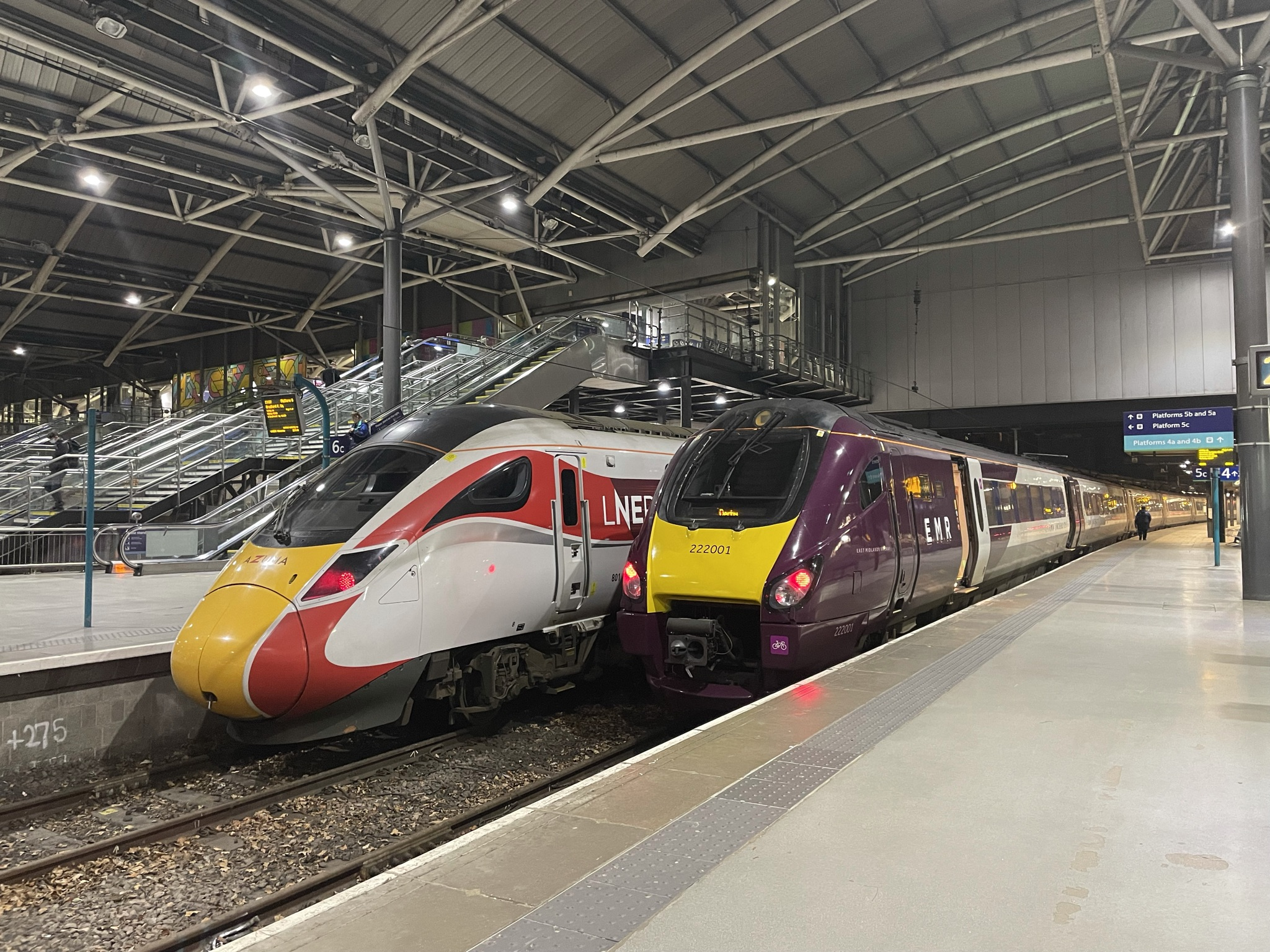
Leeds railway station

The station is the busiest rail station in the North of England, with 31 million passengers passing through annually, putting it on a par with London King's Cross. Plans are in place to improve public transport in Leeds, making it a car free city with upgrades to railway, bus services, and cycle lanes.

The main type of public transport in Leeds is bus services. Leeds City bus station (on Dyer Street) has long-distance bus services to nearby towns and cities and local area services. Bus networks are widespread throughout the city. Leeds is served by Leeds Bradford Airport, with connections to most major European cities. Air connections to Heathrow (British Airways) and Amsterdam (KLM & Jet2.com) are available.

In 2016 Leeds approved a £21m plan to district heat 2,000 homes using surplus heat from the Cross Green energy recycling and materials recovery facility, which opened in 2016.

== Development ==
Leeds has seen a whole host of development taking place across the city centre, from new student living in close proximity to the First Direct Arena, to the regeneration of the area south of the river known as Leeds South Bank. Leeds South Bank represents one of the largest single city centre regeneration initiatives in Europe, the regeneration of the 253ha South Bank, supported by the transformation of Leeds Station to include HS2, will double the size of Leeds City Centre. Already a hub for National HQs, award-winning residential development and workspaces for the creative sectors, its regeneration will facilitate development of 8,000 homes by 2028 and over 35,000 jobs.

In recent times Leeds has seen many new developments, with high rise schemes making a much larger mark on Leeds' skyline. Sixteen skyscrapers are currently under construction or proposed, all of them taller than West Riding House (262 ft or 80 m) – Leeds' tallest building from 1972 to 2005. Bridgewater Place, known locally as 'The Dalek', became the tallest building in Leeds and Yorkshire.

Leeds City Region Enterprise Zone was launched in April 2012 to promote development in four sites along the A63 East Leeds Link Road.

== See also ==
- Leeds
- Leeds City Region
- Leeds City Council
- The Yorkshire Mafia
