= Ellen Nussey =

British writer (1817–1897)

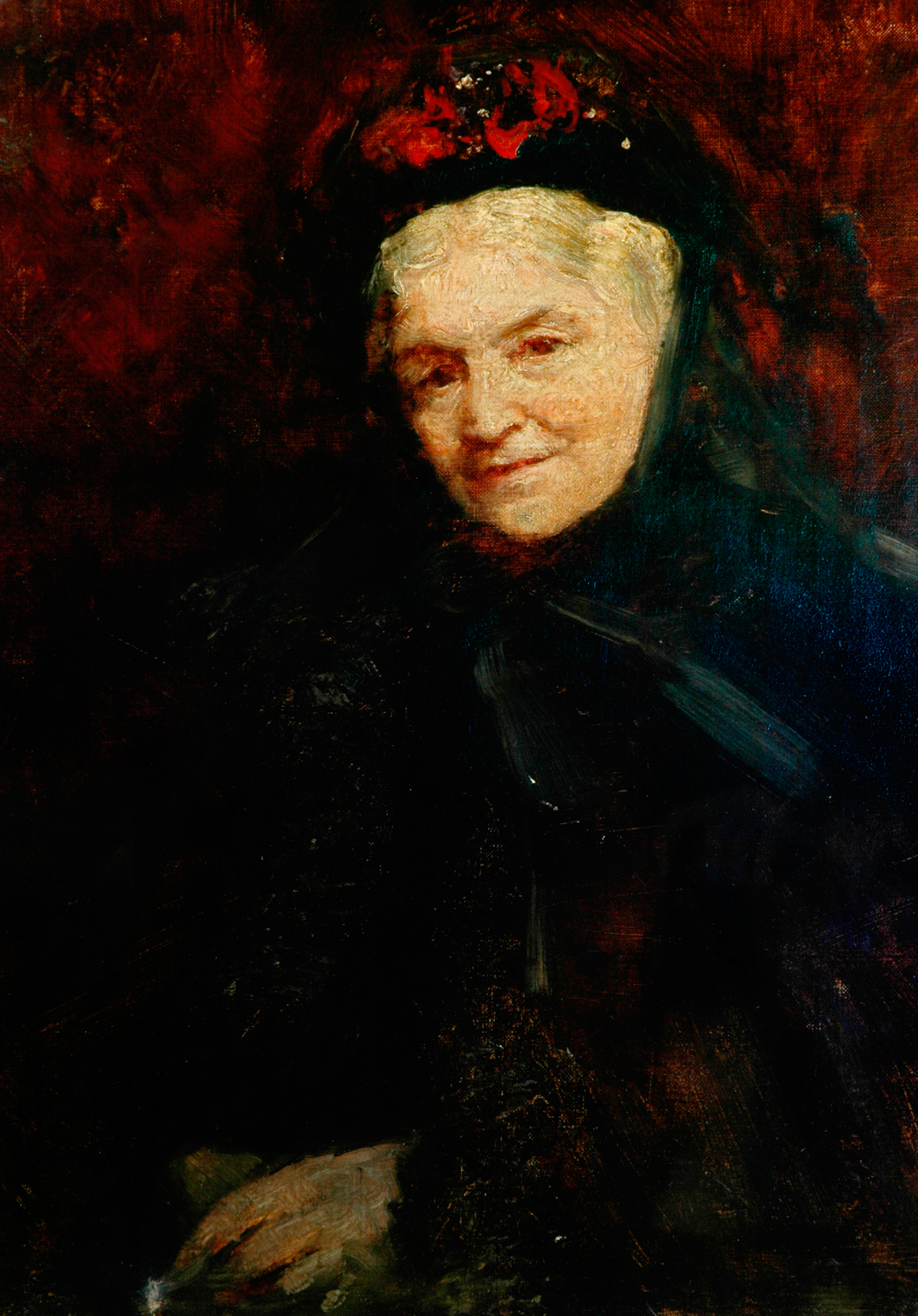
Ellen Nussey (1817–97), painting by Frederic Yates (1854–1919) held in the Brontë Parsonage Museum Collection

Ellen Nussey (20 April 1817 – 26 November 1897) was born in Birstall Smithies in the West Riding of Yorkshire, England. She was a lifelong friend of writer Charlotte Brontë and, through more than 500 letters received from her, was a major influence for Elizabeth Gaskell's 1857 biography The Life of Charlotte Brontë.

== Early years ==
Nussey was the twelfth child of John Nussey (1760–1826), a cloth merchant of Birstall Smithies, near Gomersal in the West Riding of Yorkshire, and his wife Ellen, née Wade (c. 1771–1857). She attended a small local school before progressing to Gomersal Moravian Ladies Academy. Nussey met Mary Taylor and Charlotte Brontë in January 1831, when they were pupils at Roe Head School, near Mirfield in Yorkshire. They corresponded regularly over the next 24 years, each writing hundreds of letters to the other. In 1839, Nussey's brother, Henry, proposed marriage to Brontë, but she found him dull and refused his offer.

== Friendship with the Brontës ==
Through her frequent visits to the Parsonage at Haworth, Nussey also became a friend of Anne and Emily Brontë, and was accepted as a suitable friend for his daughters by their father. In May 1849, Anne decided to visit Scarborough in the hope that the change of location and fresh sea air might be good for her failing health, and give her a chance to live. She went with Charlotte and Nussey. Before the trip, Anne expressed her frustration over unfulfilled ambitions in a letter to Ellen:

I have no horror of death: if I thought it inevitable I think I could quietly resign myself to the prospect ... But I wish it would please God to spare me not only for Papa's and Charlotte's sakes, but because I long to do some good in the world before I leave it. I have many schemes in my head for future practise–humble and limited indeed–but still I should not like them all to come to nothing, and myself to have lived to so little purpose. But God's will be done.

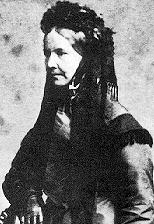
Nussey in about 1855

En route, they spent a day and a night in York, where, escorting Anne around in a wheelchair, they did some shopping, and at Anne's request, visited York Minster. It became clear that Anne had little strength left and on Sunday, 27 May 1849, she asked Charlotte whether it would be easier for her to go home to die instead of remaining at Scarborough. A doctor, consulted the next day, indicated that death was already close. Anne received the news quietly. She expressed her love and concern for Nussey and Charlotte, and seeing Charlotte's distress, whispered to her to "take courage". Nussey's presence during the weeks following gave comfort to Charlotte Brontë, who was writing her novel Shirley at the time. Nussey believed that the character Caroline Helstone was based on herself. Nussey was staying with the Brontës at Haworth on the night of the 1851 census and is shown on the return as "visitor".

When Charlotte Brontë married her father's curate, Arthur Bell Nicholls in June 1854, Nussey was one of two witnesses present. Their engagement had caused a cooling in the friendship on Nussey's part, who was probably jealous of Brontë's attachment to Nicholls, having thought they would remain spinsters. After Charlotte's death Nicholls became concerned that her letters to Nussey might damage her reputation and asked Nussey to destroy them, but she refused. Nussey sought to have the letters from Charlotte published until she learned that Nicholls held the copyright. After edited selections from more than 350 letters from Charlotte Brontë to Nussey were used in Gaskell's The Life of Charlotte Brontë, Nichols prevented at least one other publication from using them.

== Death and legacy ==
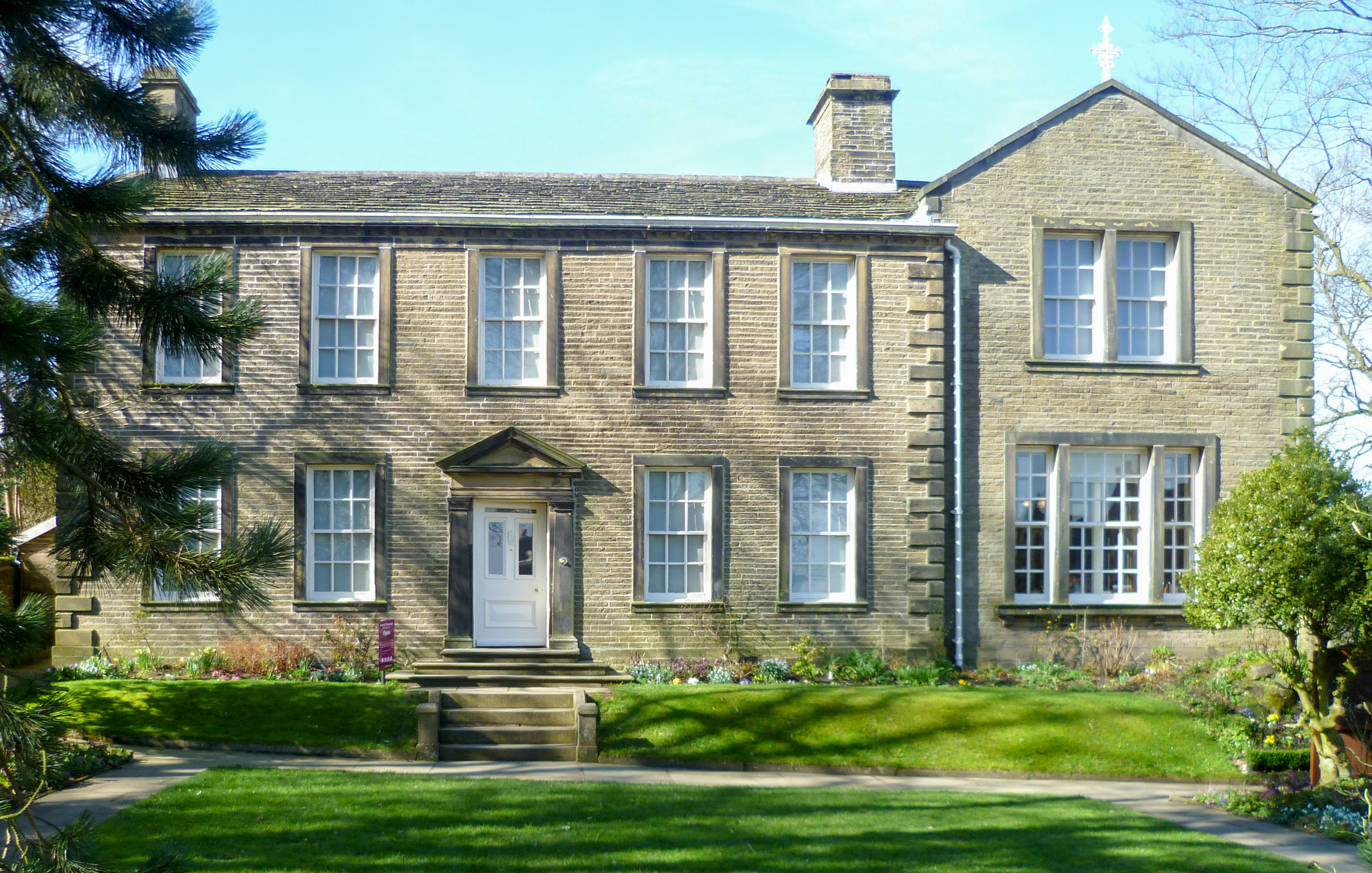
Nussey and Charlotte Brontë's correspondence is archived at the Brontë Parsonage Museum

Nussey in about 1895

After Charlotte's death in 1855, Nussey devoted the rest of her life to maintaining the memory of her friend, and was often sought out by Brontë enthusiasts and biographers.

Nussey experienced both health and financial issues in her final years and friends, including her cousin's wife, Agnes Nussey of Potternewton Hall provided her with companionship. Agnes was interested in the Nussey family history and corresponded with Ellen.

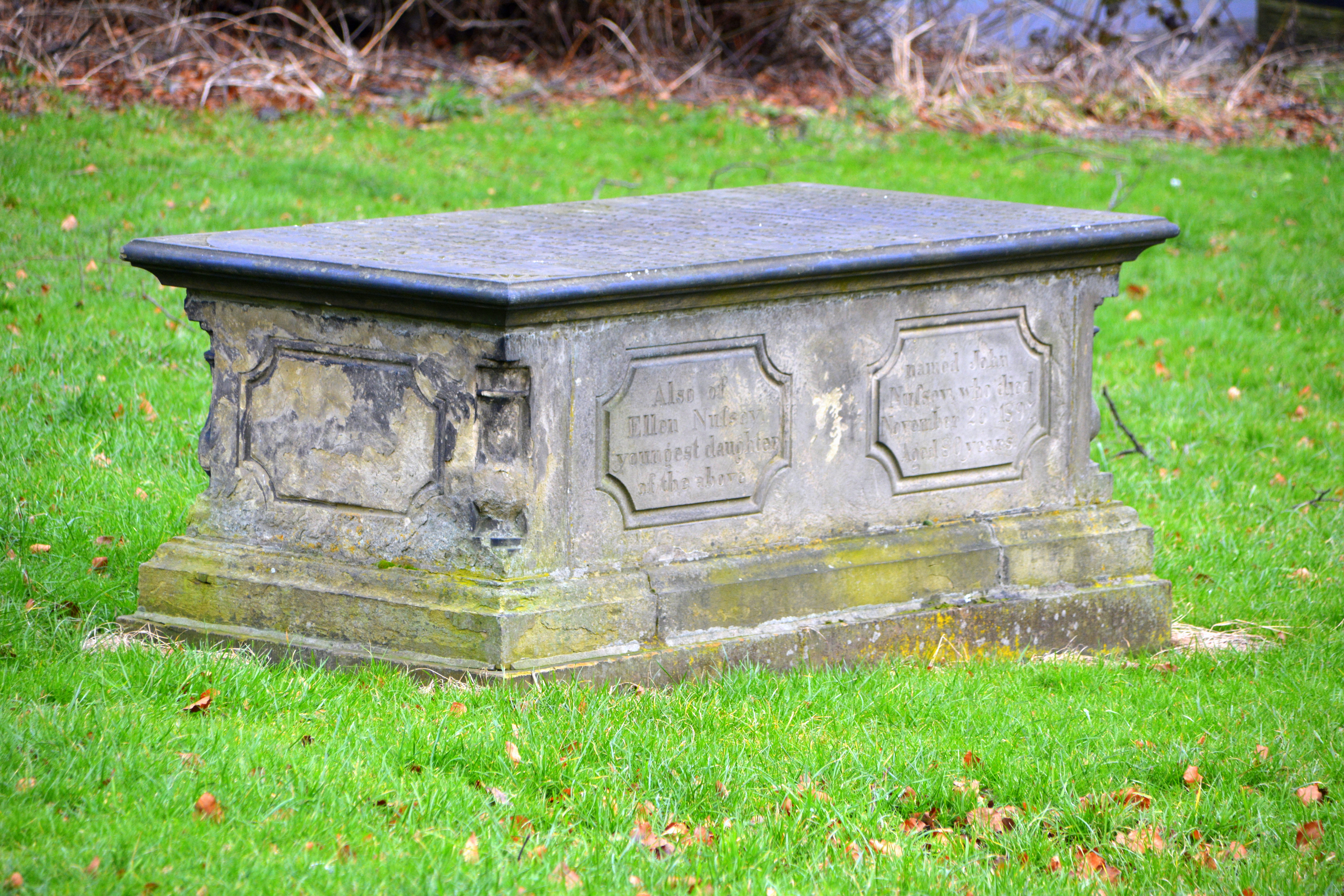
Nussey's tomb at St Peter's Church, Birstall

Nussey died in 1897, aged 80, at Moor Lane House in Gomersal in Yorkshire. Following her death, her possessions and letters were dispersed at auction, and many of Charlotte Brontë's letters to her have made their way, by way of donation or purchase, to the Brontë Parsonage Museum in Haworth in Yorkshire. She is buried at St Peter's Church, Birstall, and her tomb is listed at Grade II.

Nussey Avenue in Birstall is named after her.

Nussey was the great-aunt of Helen Georgiana Nussey (1875–1965), a welfare worker.

== Brontë letters ==
Over 350 of the some 500 letters sent by Brontë to Nussey survive, whereas all of Nussey's letters to Brontë were burned at Nicholls's request. The surviving letters provide most of the information known on Charlotte Brontë's life and are the backbone of her biographies.

Brontë's letters to Nussey have been interpreted by some to have romantic undertones:

What shall I do without you? How long are we likely to be separated? Why are we to be denied each other's society- I long to be with you. Why are we to be divided? Surely, Ellen, it must be because we are in danger of loving each other too well-

Ellen, I wish I could live with you always. I begin to cling to you more fondly than ever I did. If we had but a cottage and a competency of our own, I do think we might live and love on till Death without being dependent on any third person for happiness...

how sorely my heart longs for you I need not say... Less than ever can I taste or know pleasure till this work is wound up. And yet I often sit up in bed at night, thinking of and wishing for you.

== Bibliography ==
- Barker, Juliet R. V. (1995). The Brontës. London: Phoenix House. ISBN 1-85799-069-2.
