= Arthur Bell Nicholls =

Clergyman and Charlotte Brontë's husband

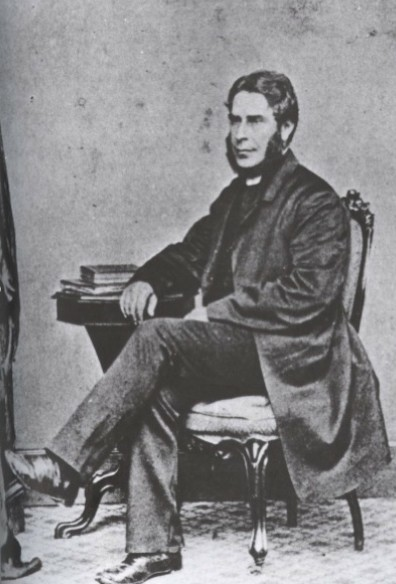
- Portrait of Nicholls in 1854
- Born: 6 January 1819; Killead, County Antrim, Ireland
- Died: 2 December 1906 (aged 87); Banagher, County Offaly, Ireland
- Education: Trinity College Dublin (1844)
- Occupation: Curate
- Spouses: Charlotte Brontë (m. 1854; died 1855) Mary Anna Bell (m. 1864)

Arthur Bell Nicholls (6 January 1819 – 2 December 1906) was an Irish Anglican priest who was the husband of the English novelist Charlotte Brontë for the last nine months of her life. Between 1845 and 1861 he served as the last curate of her vicar father Patrick Brontë. After Patrick's death in 1861 he left Yorkshire for his native Ireland, and remarried.

== Early years ==
Nicholls was one of ten children born to William Nicholls, a Presbyterian farmer and Margaret Bell Nicholls, a member of the Anglican Church of Ireland in Killead, County Antrim, in Ireland. He was educated at the Royal Free School in Banagher, County Offaly, whose headmaster was his uncle, Alan Bell. In 1836 Nicholls entered Trinity College Dublin, from where he graduated in 1844.

== Curate at Haworth ==
Nicholls was ordained deacon in Lichfield in 1845 and became assistant curate to Patrick Brontë in June. Charlotte Brontë said of him that he appeared to be a respectable young man who read well, and she hoped that he would give satisfaction. Although he visited the poor of the parish practically every afternoon, he was considered to be strict and conventional, and in 1847 he carried out a campaign to prevent women from hanging their washing out to dry in the cemetery. Charlotte noted sadly that while he was away on holiday in Ireland many parishioners said that they hoped he would not return. He began to develop closer relations with Charlotte, who by that time had written Jane Eyre, and they conducted a friendly exchange of letters. In December 1848, he conducted the funeral service of Emily Brontë.

== Marriage to Charlotte Brontë ==
On 13 December 1852 Nicholls asked Charlotte for her hand in marriage. Charlotte's father vehemently refused to approve the union on the grounds that a poor Irish pastor should never be bold enough to suggest marrying his famous daughter. In 1853 Nicholls announced his intention to leave for Australia as a missionary, but he later changed his mind despite collecting references (including one from Patrick Brontë) and a farewell gift from the parishioners. He was re-deployed for several months to another parish, but he had several secret meetings with Charlotte in Haworth. Little by little Charlotte became persuaded by Nicholls, and in February 1854 her father finally gave his permission for the visits. Charlotte's friend the novelist Elizabeth Gaskell, who believed that marriage provided "clear and defined duties" that were beneficial for a woman, encouraged Charlotte to consider the positive aspects of such a union and tried to use her contacts to engineer an improvement in Nicholls's finances. According to James Pope-Hennessy in The Flight of Youth, it was the generosity of Richard Monckton Milnes that made the marriage possible. Gaskell judged Nicholls intransigent and bigoted, adding, however, that Charlotte "would never have been happy but with an exacting, rigid, law-giving, passionate man".

Arthur Nicholls and Charlotte Brontë were married on 29 June 1854 in her father's church at Haworth. Patrick Brontë decided on the day of the ceremony not to attend, so Charlotte was led to the altar by Margaret Wooler, her former schoolmistress at Roe Head School. They honeymooned in Wales and Ireland before returning to live with Charlotte's father at Haworth Parsonage. During her honeymoon Charlotte wrote to her friend Ellen Nussey:

I think those married women who indiscriminatingly urge their acquaintance to marry – much to blame. For my part – I can only say with deeper sincerity and fuller significance – what I have always said in theory – Wait God's will. Indeed – indeed Nell – it is a strange and solemn and perilous thing for a woman to become a wife. Man's lot is far – far different.

On 26 December 1854 Charlotte wrote that Arthur "is certainly my dear boy, and he is dearer to me today than he was six months ago". The two servants at the parsonage in Haworth, Tabitha Aykroyd and Martha Brown, believed that Charlotte and Arthur were happy together.

== Charlotte Brontë's death and legacy ==
Charlotte became pregnant soon after her wedding, but her health declined rapidly and, according to Gaskell, she was subject to "sensations of perpetual nausea and ever-recurring faintness". She died, along with her unborn child, on 31 March 1855, three weeks before her 39th birthday and nine months after the wedding. Ellen Nussey, a friend of Charlotte's, accused Nicholls of being "that wicked man who was the death of dear Charlotte".

Nicholls became the copyright holder of Charlotte's works, making him an occasionally defensive and reluctant curator of her memory until the early twentieth century. Public interest in his wife, which began with the pseudonymously published Jane Eyre in 1847 and the public revelation of her true identity in 1850, rocketed in the months after the announcement of her death. As press speculation about Charlotte's private life became more intense and inaccurate Patrick Brontë requested the help of Gaskell to correct the distortions in the form of an authorised biography. Nicholls was reluctant to participate, especially as it would require him granting Gaskell permission to quote directly from Charlotte's personal letters. He relented but soon after the publication of The Life of Charlotte Brontë in 1857 he became embroiled in its controversies, writing furious letters to newspapers to defend Gaskell's depiction of Charlotte's miserable school days against the very teachers who now felt slandered. Further allegations of slander and libel led to the biography being withdrawn and re-issued twice with corrections which only served to stoke the public's imagination.

Nicholls continued living at Haworth Parsonage as Patrick's assistant until Patrick's death in June 1861 and although he was expected to succeed him as the incumbent minister the church trustees voted against him and he resigned. He put the contents of Haworth Parsonage up for auction in October 1861, retaining the family's manuscripts and private effects and distributing keepsakes to the family's servants, and moved back to Ireland.

== Return to Ireland ==
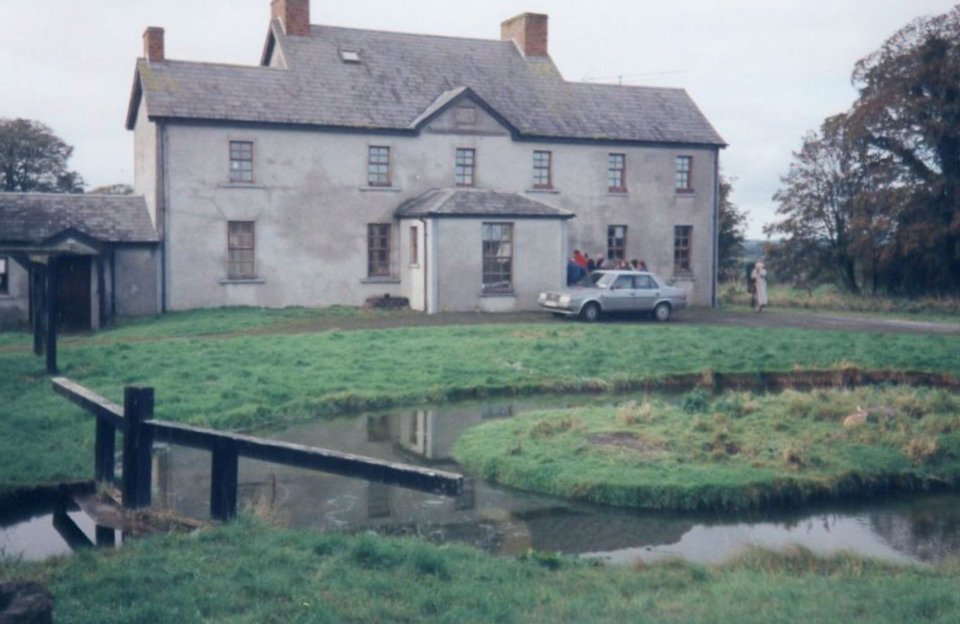
Arthur Bell Nicholls's house in Banagher, Ireland

After the deaths of Charlotte and Patrick Brontë, Nicholls returned to Banagher in County Offaly, to live with his widowed aunt and her daughter, Mary Anna Bell (1830–1915), whom he married in 1864. He left the curacy and managed a small farm, refusing to co-operate with would-be biographers who wanted to exploit his connection to the Brontës. By then they were internationally renowned as popular and significant novelists and the subjects of books and articles. He broke his silence briefly in 1876 in protest at some sections of T.W. Reid's biography of Charlotte – written in co-operation with Charlotte's oldest friend Ellen Nussey – which quoted her writings without his permission and eventually, in 1895, agreed to give Clement Shorter unlimited access to his Brontë archive. Shorter, a journalist and editor, had already convinced Ellen Nussey to sell her letters to one of his associates to safeguard them for posterity and managed to convince Nicholls to do the same. Within a year of obtaining Nicholls's collection of Brontë letters Shorter began re-selling them through auction houses.

Arthur Bell Nicholls died of bronchitis in December 1906.

His inheritance of Brontë memorabilia was sold by his widow in auctions in 1907, 1914 and then in 1916 after her own death. These lots contained the remaining Brontë manuscripts, personal possessions, furniture and artwork by the Brontës which Arthur brought from Haworth in 1861. Perhaps most significantly, these released likenesses of the Brontës that had been thought lost: the portrait of the three sisters by Branwell Brontë and the quarter of a destroyed group portrait, also by Branwell, that depicts Emily Brontë. Since then most of this collection has been returned to Haworth Parsonage, the Brontë family museum.

== See also ==
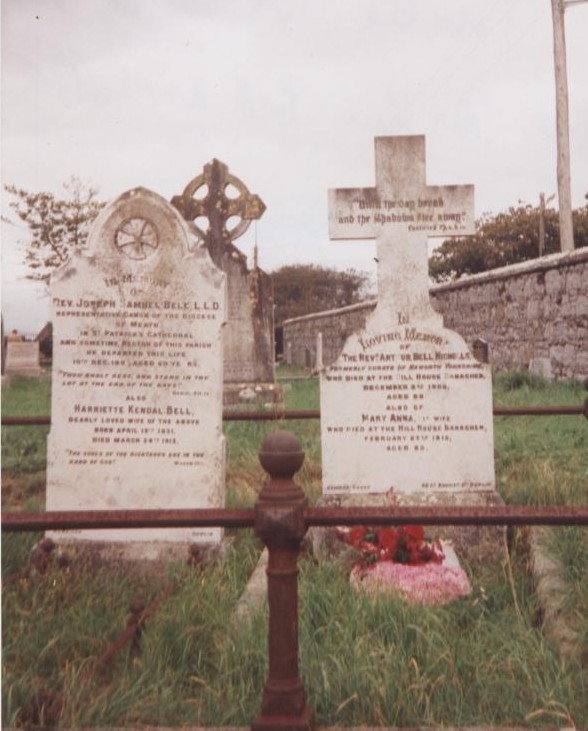
Arthur Bell Nicholls' gravestone (right) in Banagher, County Offaly

- Brontë
- Brontë Parsonage Museum
