= The Life of Charlotte Brontë =

1857 book by Elizabeth Gaskell

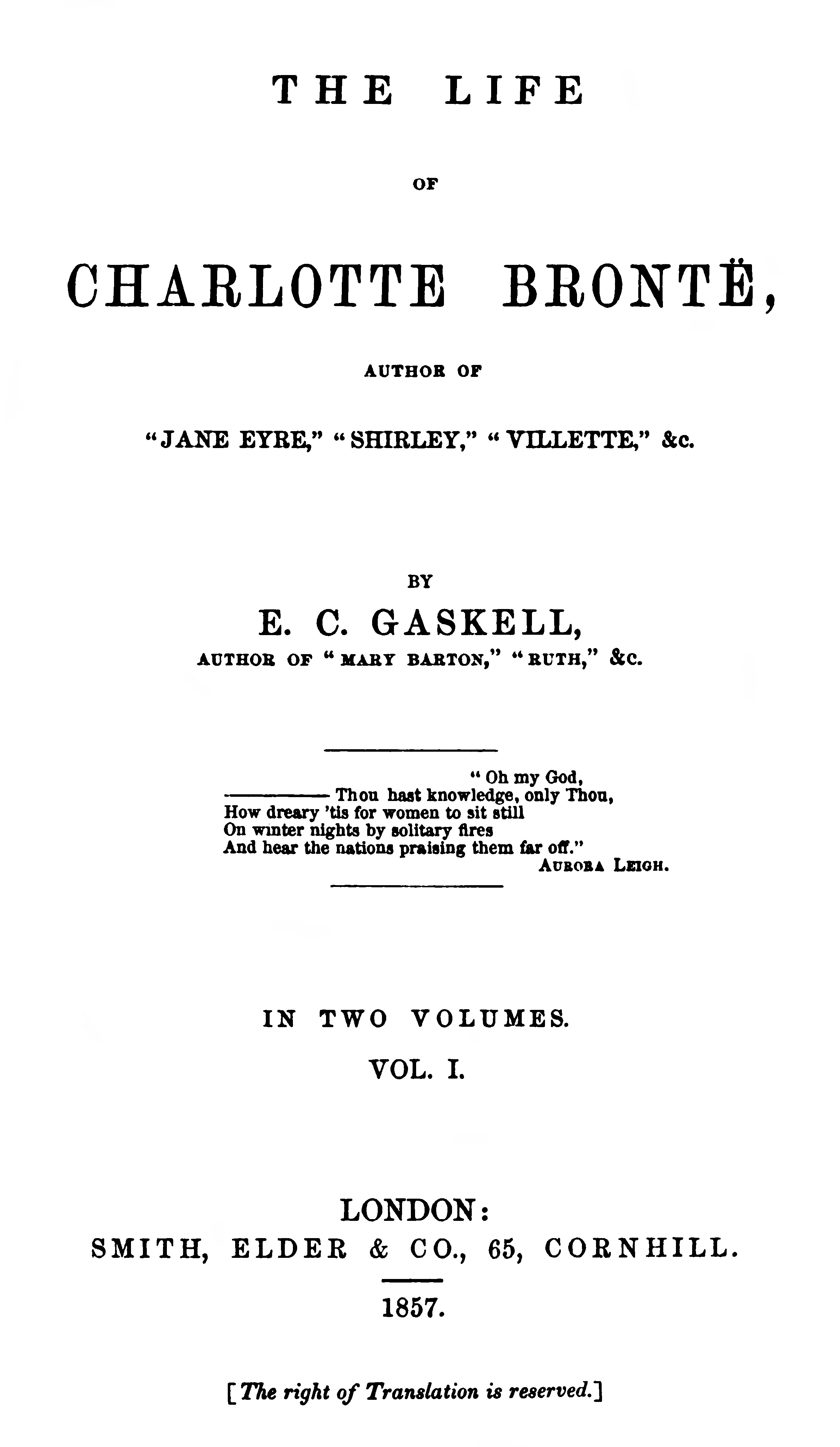
- Title page of the first edition, 1857
- Author: Elizabeth Gaskell
- Language: English
- Genre: Biography
- Publisher: Smith, Elder & Co.
- Publication date: 1857
- Publication place: United Kingdom

The Life of Charlotte Brontë by Elizabeth Gaskell is the influential first biography of Charlotte Brontë. Relying on multiple first hand testimonies and Gaskell's own memories of Brontë, its subjectivity was challenged immediately on publication and while its integrity is contested among scholars, it remains a significant source for all subsequent writing on the Brontë family. Its first edition, published in the spring of 1857, was withdrawn after complaints of slander were made to its publisher Smith, Elder & Co., prompting them to issue censored second and third editions within five months. Despite initial controversy it was praised by contemporary critics, inspired literary tourism to the Yorkshire setting of the book which continues to the present, and anticipated social and cultural discussions about the situation of women in male-dominated cultures half a century before the formal women's movements began in Britain. Now it is considered an important text that expanded the possibilities of the biographical genre and established the lives, as well as the work, of Brontë family as notable cultural subjects.

== Origins and sources ==
Gaskell was friends with Brontë for the last five years of Brontë's life, corresponding with her, staying at each others' homes and becoming acquainted with her personal circle and family circumstances in Haworth, West Yorkshire. After Brontë's death in 1855 she was approached by Brontë's father to produce a formal tribute to her, which she developed into her two volume biography The Life of Charlotte Brontë, published two years later. In reconstructing Brontë's life, Gaskell made use of a variety of primary sources, letters from and interviews with people who had known her at different periods, among them her childhood friend Mary Taylor, now living in Australia. Her most important source, from which she printed many extracts, were the letters Brontë had written to her closest friend, Ellen Nussey. She also visited the places Brontë and her family had lived and vividly described them.

== Controversy ==
Shortly after the book was published, complaints of slander were raised by individuals named or identified by Gaskell in the text, among them Brontë's own father and her husband, the headmaster and teachers of the school Brontë depicted in hellish terms in her first published novel Jane Eyre, a lover of Brontë's brother, and several of Brontë's most critical reviewers. These complaints and their resolutions were reported by the press at the time as a national scandal, with some complainants publishing their own rebuttals, such as that by the Rev. William Carus Wilson with the title "A refutation of the statements in 'The life of Charlotte Bronte,' regarding the Casterton Clergy Daughters' School, when at Cowan Bridge".

== Contemporary views ==
In her 1995 history of the Brontë family, The Brontës, Juliet Barker proposes that Gaskell's sources were flawed and she was guided by a desire to sensationalise Brontë's life for commercial gain. Subsequent investigations, such as Graham Watson's 2024 biography The Invention of Charlotte Brontë, posit that while being selective to protect Brontë's privacy, evidence demonstrates Gaskell was a comprehensive and balanced researcher, seeking to deliver a social vindication to Brontë, but that she ultimately compromised her book's integrity to defuse its legal challenges.

In 2017, The Guardian named The Life of Charlotte Brontë one of the 100 best nonfiction books of all time.
