= John Barlow (novelist) =

English writer

John Barlow (born 1967) is an English writer. He was born in the Yorkshire village of Gomersal, in Cleckheaton, West Yorkshire. He studied English Literature at the University of Cambridge and has a PhD in Applied linguistics from the University of Hull. He works as a novelist, food writer and translator, and lives in the Galician city of A Coruña (Spain).

Barlow's early books could be described as comic historical; they combine elements of farce, black humour, magical realism and folklore in what critics have described as an unusual mixture. They are strongly rooted in his Yorkshire background. More recently Barlow has branched out into children's literature and crime fiction.

Barlow's works include:

- Eating Mammals (2004), a collection of three novellas. The title work was originally published in the Paris Review, and Barlow was awarded the magazine's 2001 Plimpton (Discovery) Prize for it.
- Intoxicated (2006), subtitled "a novel about money, madness, and the invention of the world's favourite soft drink".
- Everything But The Squeal (2008), a 'gastronomic travelogue' in which he describes the little-known region of Galicia in northern Spain, as well as his attempts to consume every part of the pig, the basis of rural Galician cooking.
- What Ever Happened to Jerry Picco? (2011), a PI novel with comic elements.
- Islanders (2012), a dystopian adventure for young adult readers.
- LS9 Series. Three crime novels featuring second-hand car salesman John Ray: Hope Road (2011), Father and Son (2013), The Communion of Saints (2016).
- Joe Romano Series. Featuring Leeds-based detective Joe Romano: Right to Kill (2021), TBA (2022).

He was the ghost-writer for the Headless Project (2007–2015) of Swedish conceptual artists goldin+senneby, including the novel Headless, a fictionalised account of Barlow's investigation into an off-shore company based in the Bahamas.

His books have been translated into Italian, Polish, German, Russian, Spanish and Galician.
