= St Peter's Church, Birstall =

Coordinates: 53°43′53.548″N 1°40′12.623″W

St Peter's Church
- Church of Saint Peter
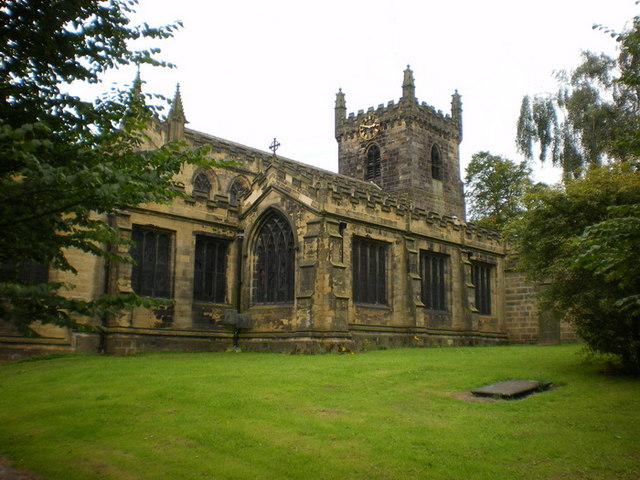
- St Peter's Church
- OS grid reference: SE 42595 44126
- Location: Birstall, West Yorkshire
- Country: England
- Denomination: Church of England
- Churchmanship: Open Evangelical
- Website: stpetersbirstall.co.uk

History
- Status: Parish church

Architecture
- Heritage designation: Grade II* listed building

Specifications
- Materials: Sandstone, slate roof.

Administration
- Province: York
- Diocese: Leeds
- Archdeaconry: Leeds
- Parish: Birstall

St Peter's Church in Birstall, West Yorkshire, England, is an active Anglican parish church in the archdeaconry of Leeds and the Diocese of Leeds.

== History ==
The church has Norman origins, being founded in 1100 by Radulphus de Paganell. The tower is the only part surviving from that era; its first two stages were built in the 12th century. The tower was raised in the 15th century and a major refurbishment was carried out between 1863 and 1870 by W. H. Crossland of Leeds. The church was grade II* listed on 29 March 1963. Between 1997 and 2000 a screen was built to separate the first bay of the nave and aisles to create meeting rooms.

== Architectural style ==
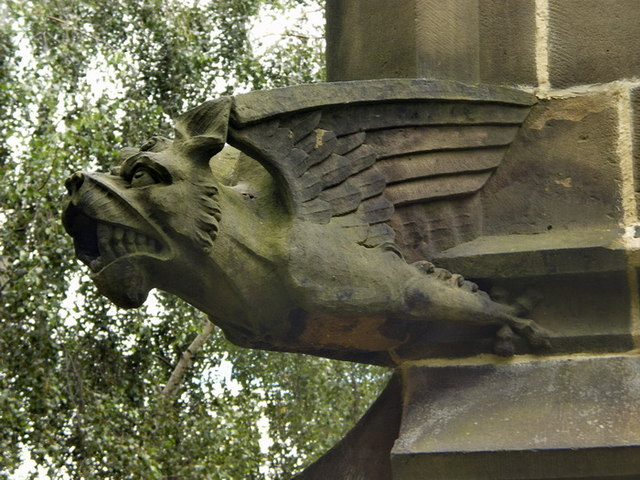
A gargoyle on the outside of the church.

=== Exterior ===
The tower has three stages: the first two are of Norman origin with diagonal buttresses and stout corner pinnacles which were added in the 15th century, while the second stage has narrow windows and a round clock on the western and the south face has a sundial dating from 1660. The chancel has diagonal buttresses and incorporates a chapel on its north side and a vestry and organ chamber on its south.

=== Interior ===
The nave has four bays with arcades with octagonal piers. The tower has a stepped round arch dating from around 1100. The outer aisles have seven-bay arcades on quatrefoil piers. The chancel has three bays. The nave and inner aisles have plastered walls while the outer aisles and chancel have exposed stone walls. The south aisle has a flagstone floor, the chancel a tiled floor while the aisle chapel has a mosaic floor.

== Fixtures ==
An early-20th-century painting of Christ in Glory by Edward Reginald Frampton is on the east wall. The octagonal font has a panelled bowl and stem which dates from the 15th century. It had been discarded in 1771 but reinstated in 1841. The pulpit is made of stone construction and has a wrought-iron balustrade. The pews date from around 1870 and have roundels to the top. The reredos depicts the Last Supper.

== Listed tombs ==
There are two Grade-II-listed tombs in the churchyard. John Nelson was an associate of John Wesley and a pioneer of Methodism in West Yorkshire. Ellen Nussey, buried with her father John, was a lifelong friend and correspondent of Charlotte Brontë.
