= Red House Museum =

Coordinates: 53.7324°N 1.6864°W

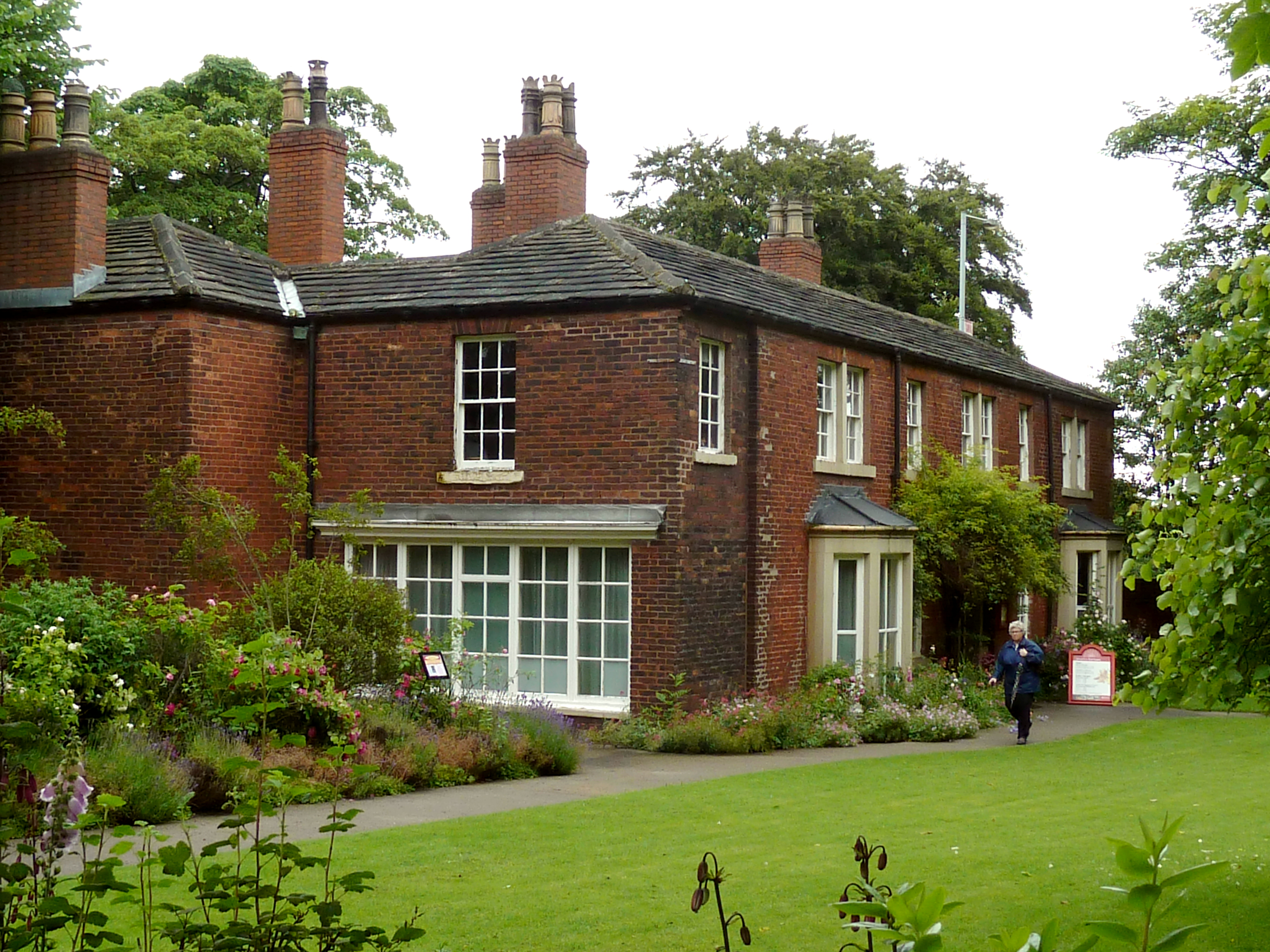
- Red House Museum, Gomersal
- Established: 1974
- Location: Oxford Road, Gomersal, West Yorkshire, England; BD19 4JP
- Type: Historic house museum

Red House Museum was a historic house museum, built in 1660 and renovated in the Georgian era. It closed to the public at the end of 2016 but remains as a Grade II* listed building in Gomersal, Kirklees, West Yorkshire, England.

== History ==
Red House was built by William Taylor whose descendants owned it until 1920. The Taylor family had lived in Gomersal for more than a century when in 1660, William Taylor built a brick house next to their old one. The family were farmers and clothiers who developed their business into cloth finishing and became merchants.

The old house was standing in 1713 and surrounding workshops contained items for cloth manufacture. The old house was probably demolished when the barn to the west of the house and coach house were built in the mid-18th century. The house is constructed of red brick, unusual in a village built of local sandstone, and consequently was named the Red House. The exterior and interior were remodelled during the 18th century, and in 1920 the parlour and dining room windows were enlarged.

The house was Grade II* listed in January 1967 for its historic, industrial and literary interest and because it "contains some good survivals of the Georgian period, including a staircase, fireplaces and windows, embedded in a late C17 core." Also of interest are the barn and coach house. Spenborough Council bought the house in 1969 and it opened as a museum five years later.

== Architecture ==
=== Exterior ===
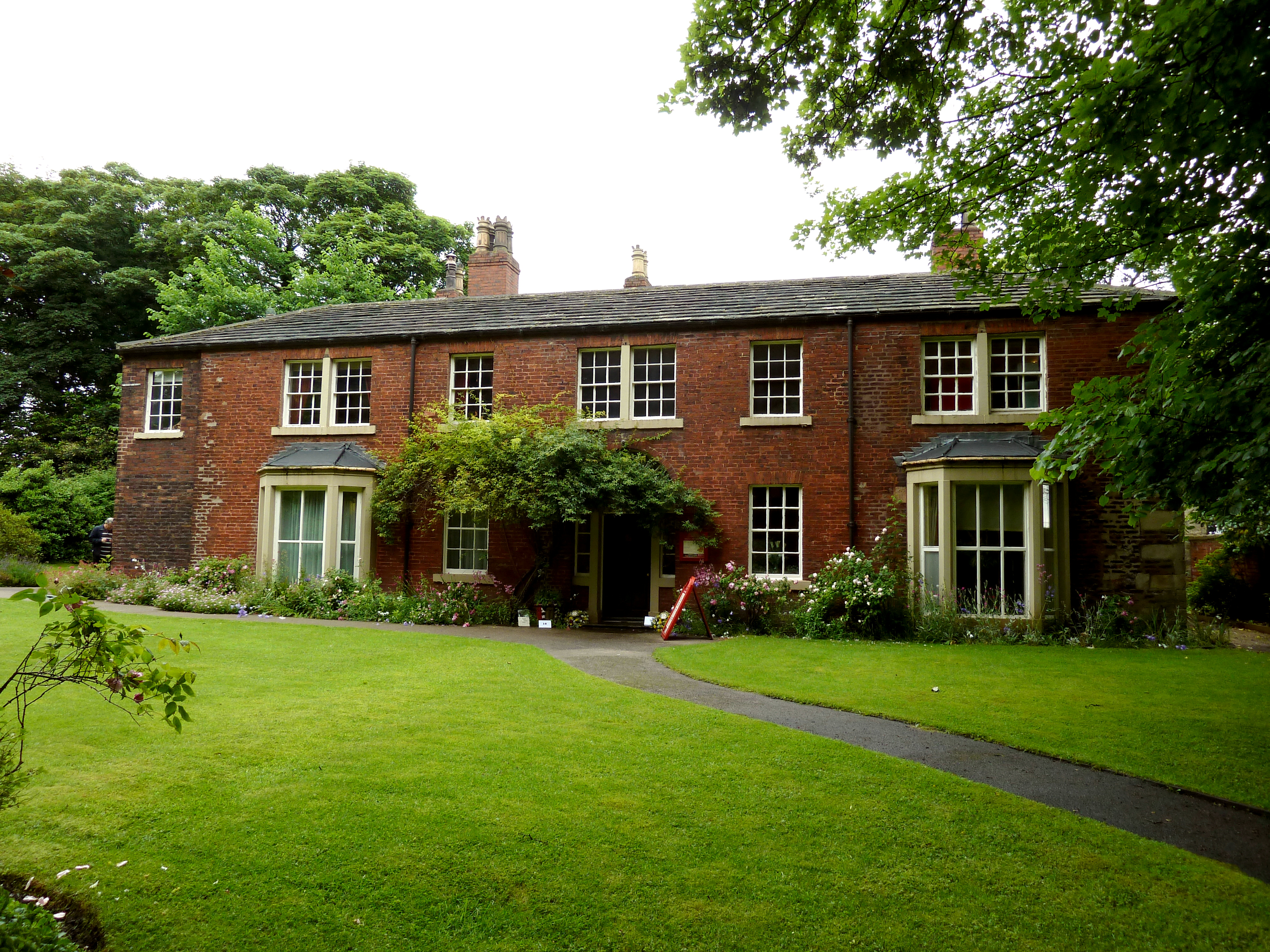
Front elevation

The two-storey house is built of red brick with stone quoins and has a stone slate roof that is hipped at the front and four gables to the rear. The doorway is off-centre and has a sash window and a canted bay window to either side. The upper storey has three double and two single sash windows. The rear wall with four gables was rebuilt between 1995 and 1997.

=== Interior ===
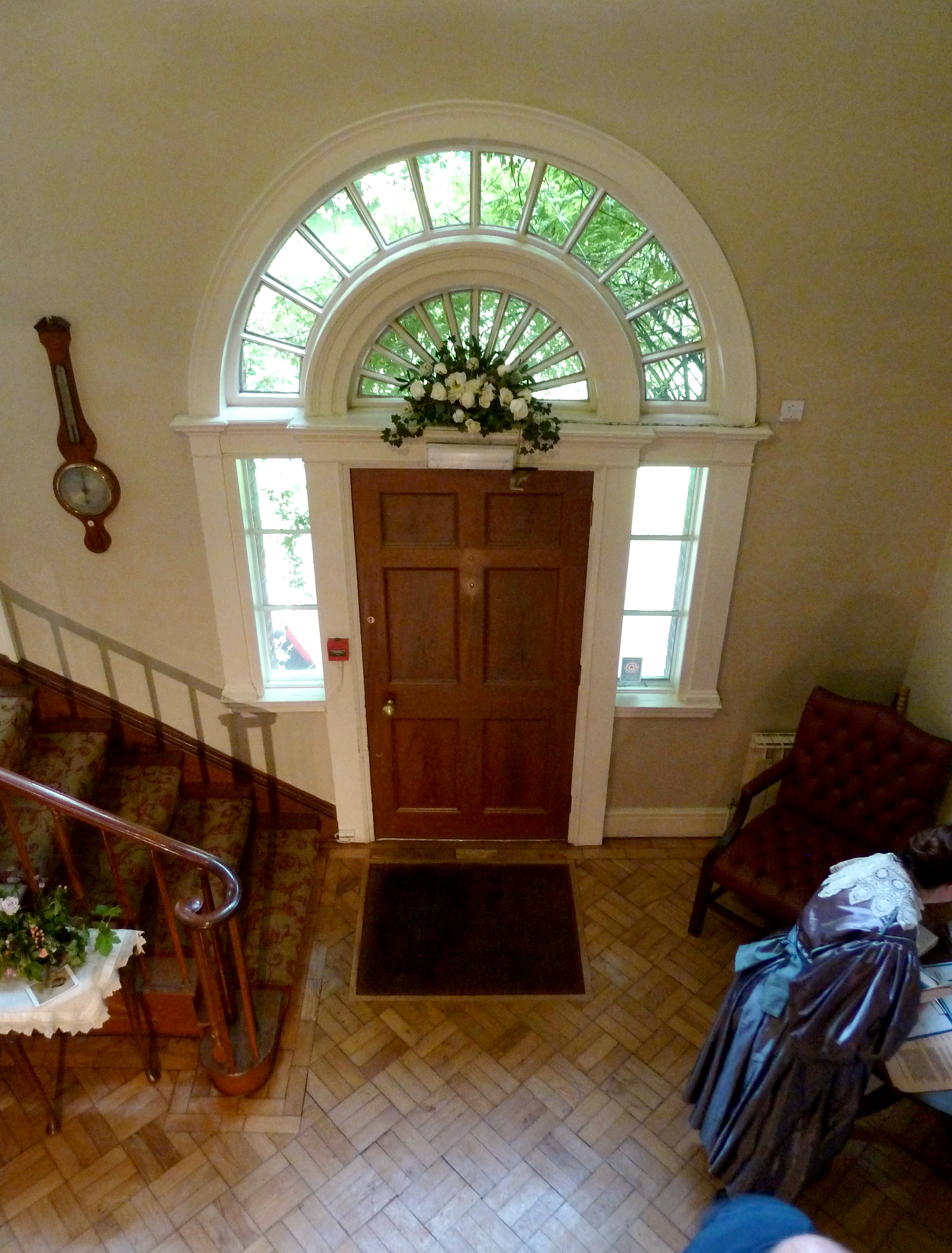
Interior view of 18th century door frame

The house is decorated and furnished to suggest its appearance during the 1830s when Joshua Taylor, a woollen cloth manufacturer who owned a mill at Hunsworth near Cleckheaton, and his wife Anne and their six children were living there.

The entrance hall contains an 18th-century staircase with slender wooden balusters leading to a galleried landing of the same period. The hall has grained woodwork in the Georgian style, and is hung with portraits of the Taylor family from between 1737 and 1817. They are of Joshua Taylor's sister Deborah (1771–1810), his parents, John (1737–1805) and Anne (1739–1817) and his father-in-law Captain Tickell.

Displays in the parlour, dining room, study, governess' room, scullery, kitchen and bedchambers are recreations of the 1830s era, utilising 19th-century furniture. The dining room contains stained glass windows with portraits of William Shakespeare and John Milton and a painting of the 1794 eruption of Mount Vesuvius, which are described in the novel Shirley. Several rooms contain 18th-century hob grates or iron fire grates with integral ledges for heating food in pots or pans.

=== Garden and outbuildings ===
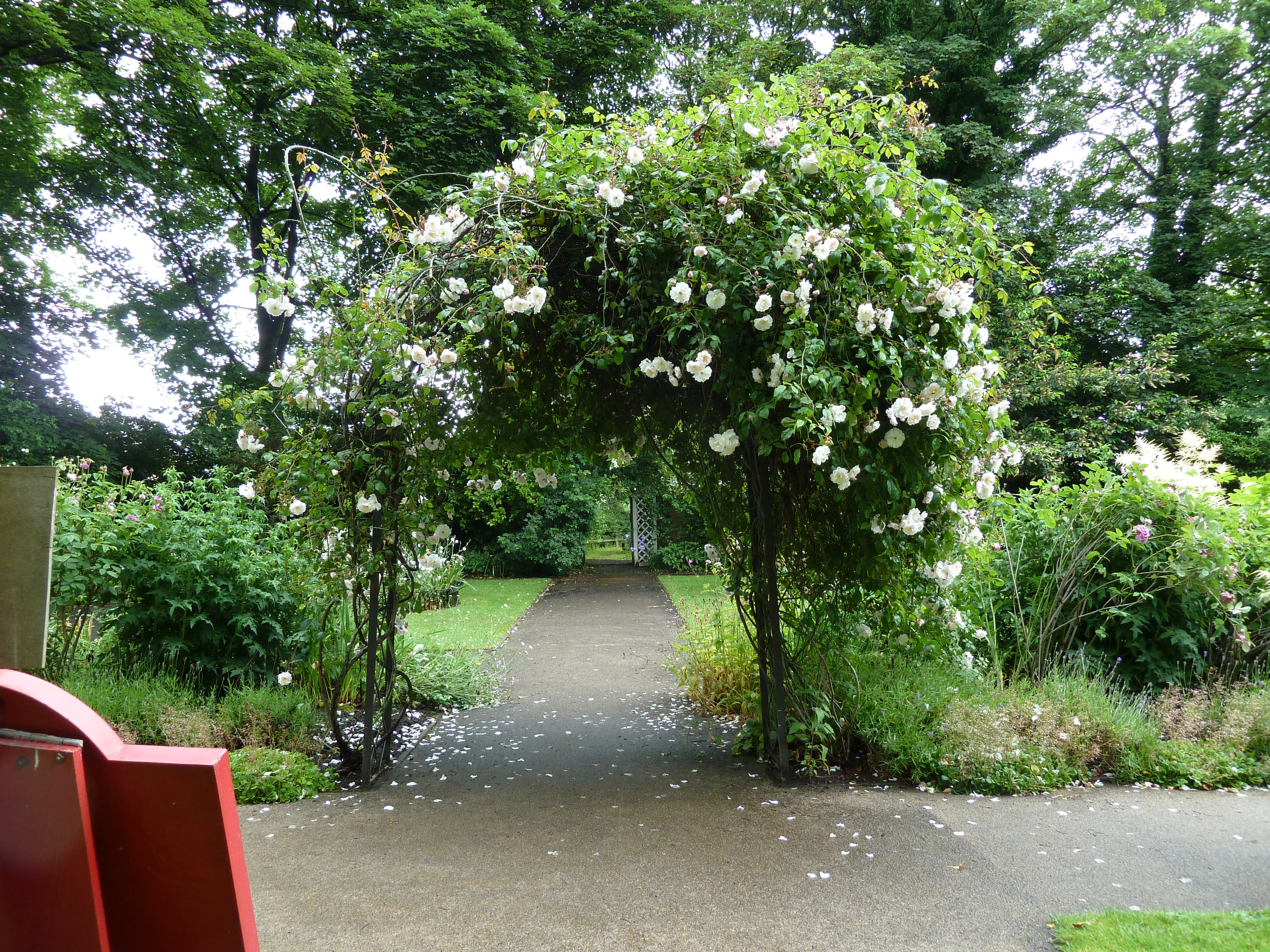
Rose trained over arch in grounds

The garden has been designed with lawns, scented old climbing roses, an arbour and borders containing old-fashioned flowers to reflect 19th-century taste. It contains a display of old gateposts on the lawn.

A two-storey stone barn with a stone slate roof and cart entrance is situated to the west of the house. The stone coach house has four open-fronted arches. Its interior has been restored.

== Notable visitors and staff ==
John and Charles Wesley, the Methodist preachers who were friends of John Taylor, the great-grandson of William Taylor, visited the house. Charlotte Brontë, who had been a pupil at Roe Head with Mary Taylor, the daughter of Joshua Taylor, a banker and wool merchant was also a visitor. She immortalised the family as the Yorkes and the house as Briarmains in her novel Shirley. Reverend Lauten of Gomersal Moravian Church, a visitor in the 1840s, may have been the inspiration for the Moravian minister in Shirley.

Mabel Ferrett (1917–2011), poet, publisher, literary editor and local historian, worked at the museum and wrote The Taylors of the Red House (1987).

== Closure ==
As a result of government funding cuts, Kirklees Council considered that it could only afford to operate two museums, one in the north of the borough and one in Huddersfield. Red House, the Tolson and Dewsbury Museums were consequently threatened with closure. The Council for British Archaeology Yorkshire said the authority wanted to save £531,000 by 2017–18. Friends of the museum and literary groups concerned with the loss of a Brontë connection were dismayed at the prospect of the museum closing and campaigned to keep it open. Kirklees Council closed Red House on 21 December 2016. Its contents will be stored or dispersed and the building is to be sold.

As of June 2018 the building was still unsold and almost £30,000 had been spent on its upkeep. It sold at auction in December 2024 for £650,000.
