= Mary Taylor (women's rights advocate) =

English women's rights advocate

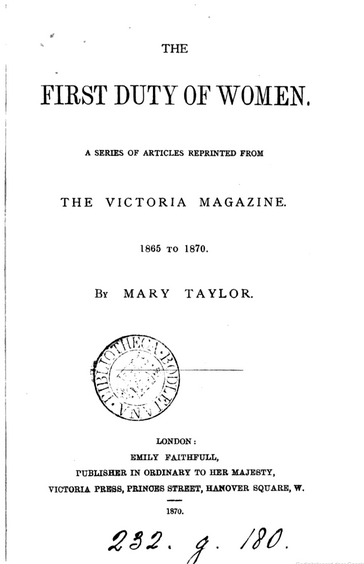
Mary Taylor: The First Duty of Women. A series of articles reprinted from the Victoria Magazine 1865 to 1870. Title page. London, Emily Faithfull, Victoria Press, 1870.

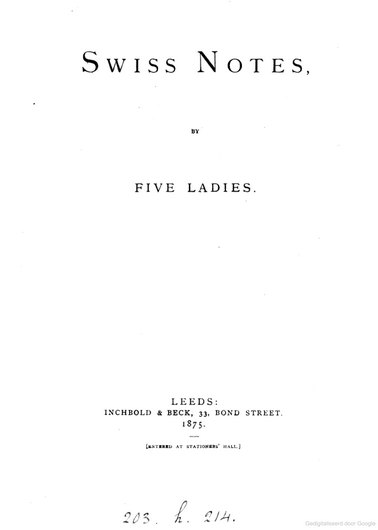
Mary Taylor: Swiss Notes, by Five Ladies. Title page. Leeds Inchbold and Beck, 1875.

Mary Taylor (1817 – 1 March 1893) an early advocate for women's rights, was born in Gomersal, in the West Riding of Yorkshire, England.

== Early life ==
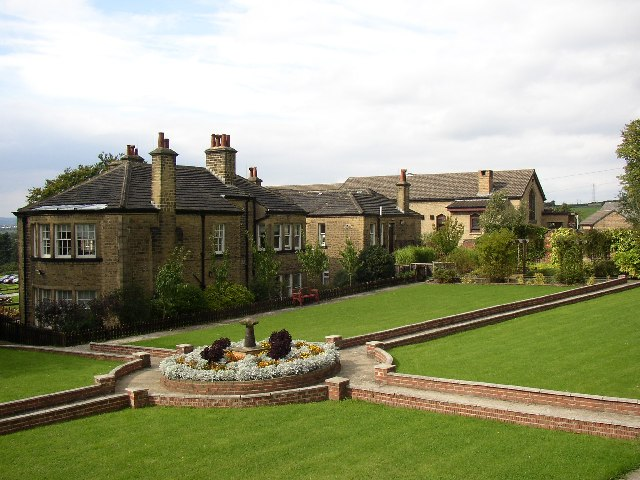
Roe Head School in Mirfield

Mary Taylor's father Joshua, a cloth manufacturer, and his wife Anne had six children of which she was the fourth. Her father, a radical and member of the Methodist New Connexion, was bankrupted in 1826, but determined to repay his creditors.

Mary was an impulsive, clever child who shared her father's independent traits. She met Ellen Nussey and Charlotte Brontë in 1831 at Roe Head School in Mirfield where they became firm lifelong friends despite having opposing views. At school Taylor, while quiet, was defiant, standing by her opinions and practising what she preached. Brontë, a visitor to the Taylor's home, Red House, described the family's company as 'one of the most rousing pleasures I have ever known'.

== European Tour ==
Taylor's father died in December 1840 and Mary embarked on a European tour before joining her sister at the Château de Koekelberg, a finishing school in Brussels. Her correspondence with Charlotte Brontë described what she had seen on her travels inspiring her to go to Brussels in 1842. After her sister's death in October 1842, Taylor went to Germany where, challenging established convention, she found employment teaching young men.

== Life in New Zealand ==
In March 1845, Taylor followed her youngest brother, Waring, who had arrived in Wellington in 1842, to New Zealand. Here, she had a house built on Cuba Street, which she let out for rent whilst also earning as a piano teacher. In a letter, Charlotte Brontë writes Mary was "in her element- because she is where he has a toilsome task to perform, an important improvement to effect- a weak vessel (Waring) to strengthen- she will remain in New Zealand as long as she can there find serious work to do - but no longer".

Taylor also attempted to earn a living by sending written articles to English magazines, only to be unsuccessful in getting them published. During her stay in Wellington, Taylor also wrote a 150-page novel that would be published 40 years later, rumoured to be "Miss Miles".

In 1849, Mary's cousin, Ellen Taylor, arrived in New Zealand, and despite being 12 years her junior, boosted Mary's confidence and enthusiasm with much-needed companionship during her stay. They leased a subdivision of Town Acre 178 where the two women built a two-storey house and planned to open a drapery and garment business by 1850. Having observed much of the dealings of her brother's business in trading commodities such as wool, land, cattle and clothing, Mary caught on and had met many prospective clients. Waring helped the two women with their bookkeeping and the business quickly took off. Mary and Ellen hoped to make £300 - £400 annually from the shop. The drapery had a gabled roof, a generous 28-foot (8.5 m) by 26-foot (7.9 m) building footprint and served as both a business and place of residence for Mary and Ellen in the upstairs rooms.

In 1851, when Ellen fell ill to tuberculosis, Mary nursed her cousin and after her death continued to work alone in the shop, where the business continued to grow. Mary had to have the building extended and hire a sales assistant. An 1853 Wellington Almanack lists her shop as one of the most popular stores in the region. Before Mary left Te Aro in 1859, she invested £400 of her capital from selling her business into land in Te Aro, one in Abel Tasman Street, another in Ghuznee Street.

She never had intended to remain in New Zealand, and sold the shop that had provided her with a good income in a way a middle-class woman would have found impossible in England. She returned to Yorkshire before 1860.

== Return to Yorkshire and death ==
When she was financially secure Taylor returned to Gomersal. High Royd, the house built for her, was her home for the rest of her life. She made annual visits to Switzerland & the Alps, & in 1875 led a ten week expedition which was written up & published as Swiss Notes by Five Ladies which includes an account of an ascent of Mont Blanc by some members of the party.

News of her death in Yorkshire on 1 March 1893 was received in New Zealand in May 1893.

== Feminist Ideologies ==
Taylor was an avid reader of literature and used to read while running her drapery in New Zealand. Her home in Gomersal shows her love for reading where a clear path in the carpet indicates the constant pacing she would do while reading. In her time back in Yorkshire, between 1865 and 1870, Taylor published many articles for Victoria Magazine illustrating her many feminist ideas which were compiled into the book, The First Duty of Women. Her great solace in reading and finding inspiration in it sheds insight on her opinions regarding women being discouraged from spending their time with books as she writes in First Duty of Women "Let them undertake, then, the duty of providing for their own mental progress, as they must bear the consequences of neglecting it". In these articles, she also states that women should be responsible for earning their own living and that to marry solely on the basis of money was demeaning. Taylor strongly negated the idea that women were bound in duty to sacrifice themselves for others, and criticized Charlotte Brontë for inducing the notion that a working life was not meant for all women. In her letter to Charlotte she writes: "You are a coward and a traitor. A woman who works is by that alone better than one who does not and a woman that does not happen to be rich and who still earns no money and does not wish to do so, is guilty of a great fault- almost a crime." It is clear in Mary's many letters and in her writings that one of her central beliefs in life was that it was necessary for a woman to work in order to grant herself independence and happiness. In her book Miss Miles or a Tale of Yorkshire life 60 years ago, Taylor writes about the lives of five women in Gomersal and their attitudes towards work; where four of the women endure financially and mentally due to their working lives, whilst the fifth woman who doesn't have the motivation to pursue independent work is fated towards a woeful life.

Taylor remarked that her time and efforts spent in Wellington would be the part of her life which she would consider most agreeable because of the attitudes of settlers and the equal opportunities available for all those establishing the new township regardless of their sex and age. In settler ideology, there was a strong opposition to snobbery and any efforts to impose class distinctions which wholly satisfied Mary. In her letter to Brontë in June 1848, Taylor provides social commentary on lower class and middle-class women, writing, "Mrs Taylor Miss Knox and Mrs Logan sat in mute admiration while we mentioned these things, being employed in the meantime in making a patchwork quilt. Did you ever notice that the women of middle classes are generally too ignorant to talk to?, and that you are thrown entirely on men for conversation? There is no such feminine inferiority in the lower. The women go hand in hand with the men in the degree on cultivation that they are able to reach. I can talk very well to a joiner's wife, but seldom to a merchants."

== Publications ==
- Taylor, Mary (1870). The first duty of women. A series of articles reprinted from the Victoria Magazine. 1865 to 1870. London: Emily Faithfull, Victoria Press. Text on books.google.com.
- Taylor, Mary (1875). Swiss notes, by five ladies. Leeds: Inchbold & Beck. OCLC 806089125. Text on books.google.com, official author is "Five Ladies".
- Taylor, Mary (1991). Miss Miles. A Tale of Yorkshire Life 60 Years Ago. Oxford: Oxford University Press. ISBN 9780195064926. Original first edition published 1890. Introduction by Janet H. Murray.
- Taylor, Mary (1972). Stevens, Joan (ed.). Mary Taylor, friend of Charlotte Bronte : letters from New Zealand and elsewhere. Auckland, N.Z., Wellington, N.Z.: Auckland University Press; Oxford University Press. OCLC 682789.
