= Leeds Building Society =

UK savings institution

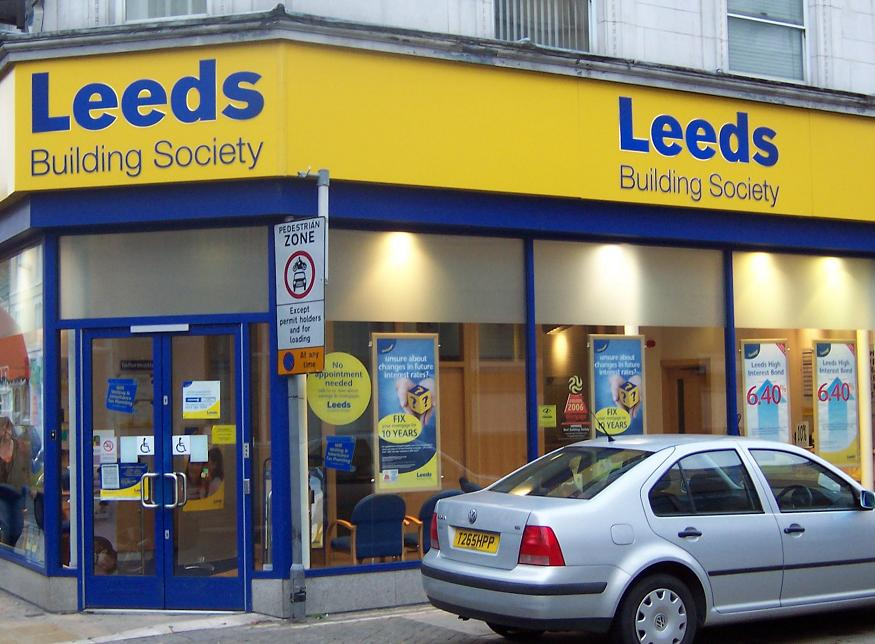
- A high-street branch of the Leeds Building Society in Peterborough
- Type: Building society, (mutual)
- Industry: Financial services
- Founded: 1875; 151 years ago
- Headquarters: Leeds, England
- Number of locations: 56
- Key people: Annette Barnes (chief executive)
- Products: Savings, Mortgages, Investments, Insurance, Financial Planning
- Revenue: ▲£376.7 million (2022)
- Operating income: ▲£220.5 million (2022)
- Net income: ▲£161.9 million (2022)
- Total assets: ▲£25,513 million (2022)
- Total equity: ▲£1,506 million (2022)
- Number of employees: ▲1,538 (2022); 1,474 (2021)
- Website: Official website

Leeds Building Society (formerly known as the Leeds and Holbeck Building Society) is a British building society based in Leeds, West Yorkshire. It serves over 991,000 members across the United Kingdom and holds over £31.6 billion in assets. It is a member of the Building Societies Association.

== History ==
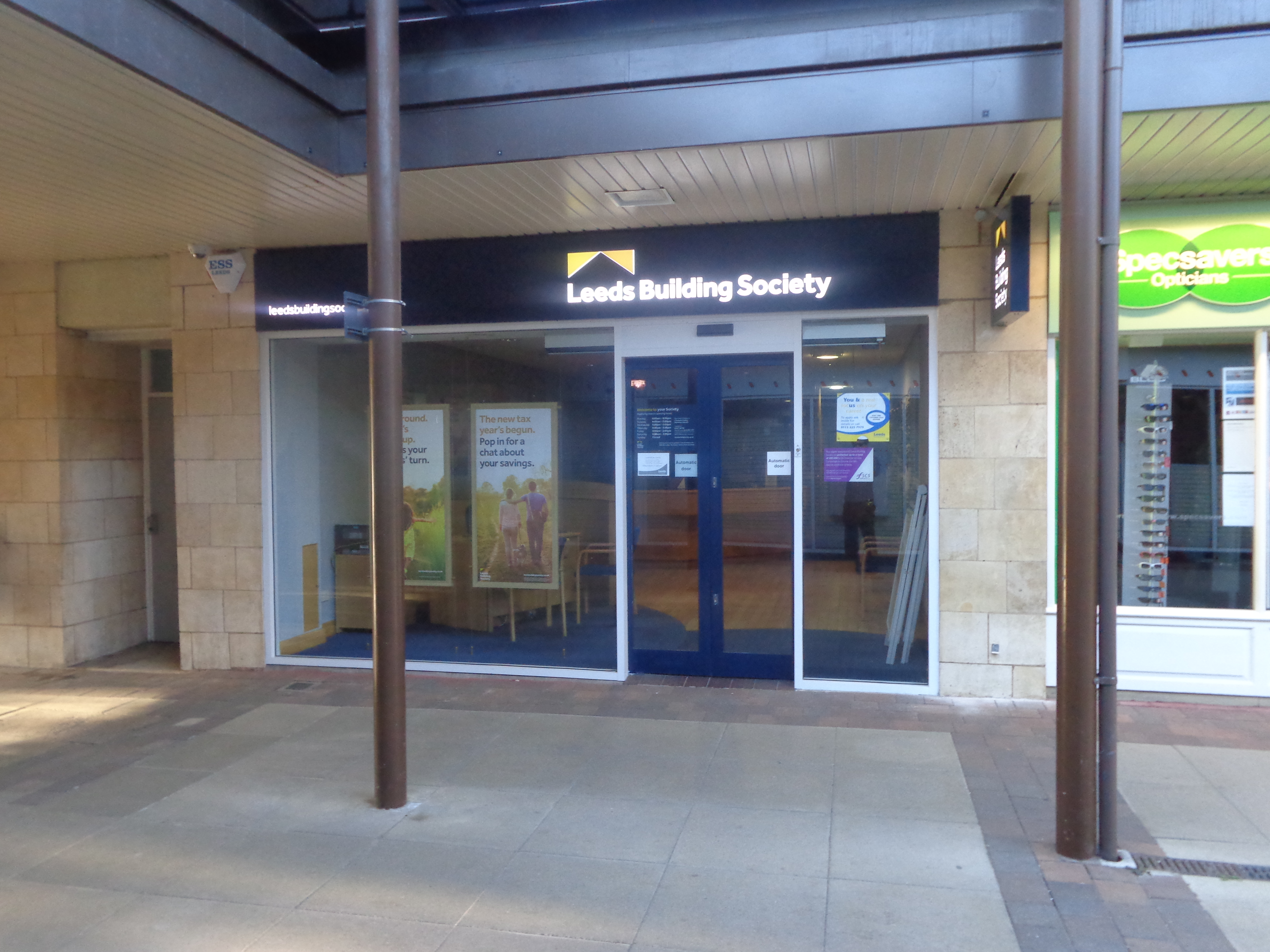
A branch in Wetherby in new branding

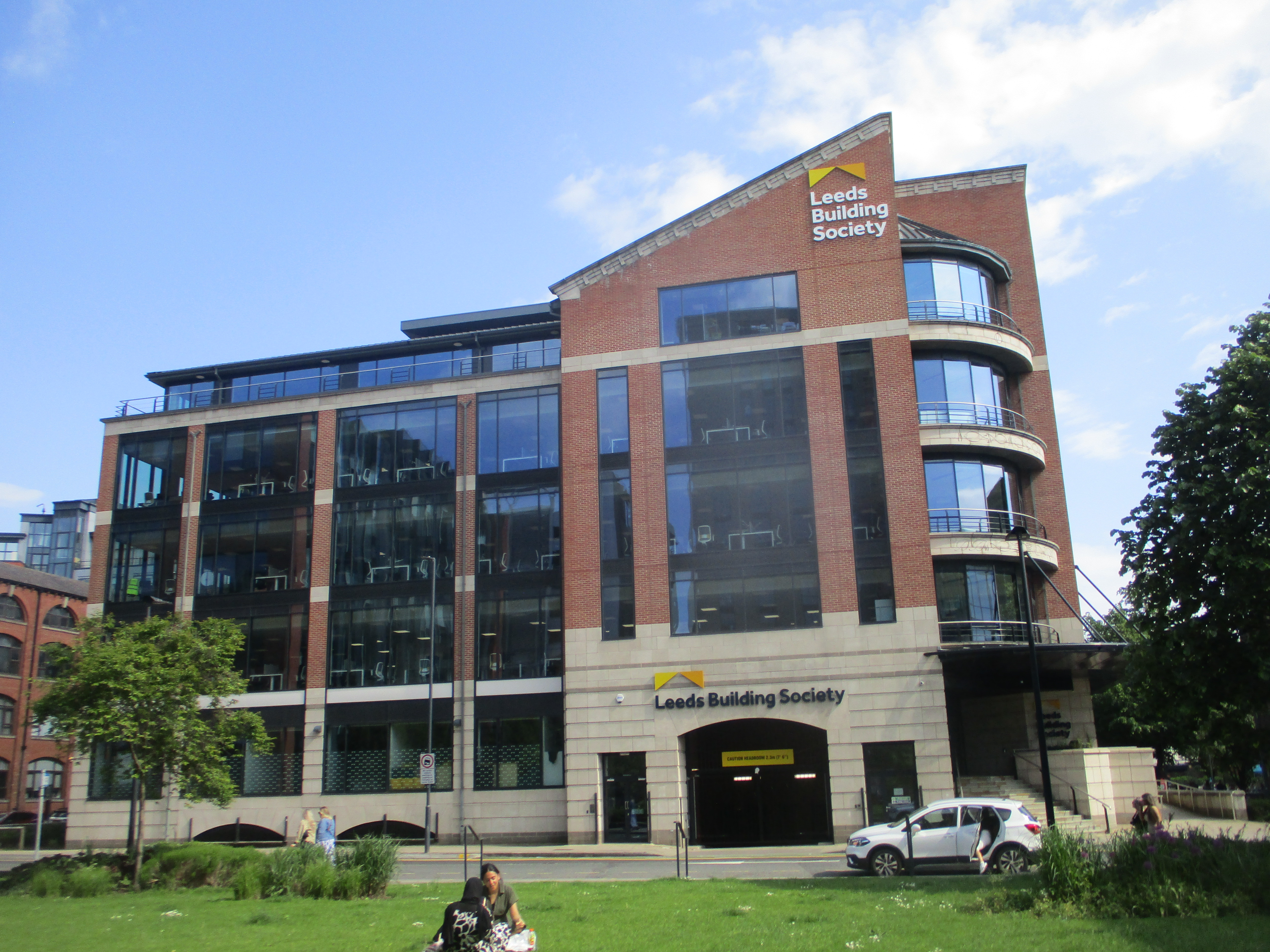
The new headquarters on Sovereign Square in Leeds.

The society was registered as the Leeds and Holbeck (Permanent) Building Society in 1875, though the society originated from a group called the Leeds Union Operative Land and Building Society which formed in 1845.

On 1 August 2006, following approval by the Mercantile members and confirmation by the Financial Services Authority (FSA), Leeds Building Society merged with Mercantile Building Society, in North Shields, an area of North Tyneside, in Tyne and Wear.

=== Presence in Ireland ===
The society had a presence in Ireland from 2006 until 2018. It offered mortgages up to 14 September 2009, with savings accounts available throughout the period. In 2017, it closed its savings operation to new customers. In July 2018, it gave notice to all savings customers that their accounts were to close in September. In October 2018, it sold its Irish mortgage book to Dilosk and these are now managed by Pepper Finance Corporation.

It is regulated by the UK Financial Conduct Authority and the Prudential Regulation Authority. It is also a member of the UK Financial Services Compensation Scheme.

In its last full year of operations, 2017, the society lost £1.2m on its Irish operations.

== Sponsorship ==
The Leeds Building Society is also the main shirt sponsor of the Super League rugby league side Leeds Rhinos.

== Arms ==
Coat of arms of Leeds Building Society
Notes Granted 25 July 1960 Crest On a wreath of the colours an owl between two sprigs of thrift flowered and leaved Proper. Escutcheon Azure a fesse wavy Argent surmounted of a tower Or on a chief Sable three mullets also Argent. Supporters On either side a griffin Argent gorged with a collar Gules charged with three bezants pendent from the collar a key also Gules and resting the interior hind paw on a rose also Argent barbed and seeded Proper. Motto Servate Et Servite
