= The Yorkshire Mafia =

Yorkshire Mafia
- Industry: Business Networking
- Founded: November 2008
- Headquarters: Yorkshire, United Kingdom
- Area served: Yorkshire, UK
- Key people: Geoff Shepherd
- Website: Homepage

The Yorkshire Mafia is a community built around LinkedIn that was founded in November 2008 by Geoff Shepherd. Its headquarters are in Leeds. It provides its 22,000 regional business members with a platform to build professional relationships, obtain necessary skills from established entrepreneurs and trade with each other.

The Yorkshire Mafia hosts some of the biggest business-to-business events in the North England. Events include small round-table discussions, social events, Leeds Business Week and an annual conference, Buy Yorkshire. The Yorkshire Mafia uses these events to facilitate the building of business relationships for multiple businesses across the county.

== Overview ==
The Yorkshire Mafia depends on social media networks, grown out of a LinkedIn-based networking group to encourage local businesses. In its second conference in April 2012, delegates heard from Wade Burgess, LinkedIn director of northern Europe, and Ivan Heneghan, head of strategic client services at Facebook. Around 3,000 attended the event.

The motto of the group is: "a tight-knit group of diverse industry executives who share a homogenous interest in the advancement of the Yorkshire region."

== Events ==
=== Skill Will ===
One of the events held by Yorkshire Mafia is Skill Will. Skill Will is a Social Enterprise offering business, public, charity and social enterprise sectors the opportunity to meet, connect and support each other through partnership opportunities and programmes.

Skill Will was originally set up for businesses and charities across Yorkshire, but the organization has now spread across United Kingdom. Businesses are offered targeted assistance enabling volunteers to improve their skills, create new contacts and raise morale within businesses.

=== Other events ===
Yorkshire Mafia facilitates better relationships by bringing businesses together in Yorkshire in order to promote healthy relationships among them. Buy Yorkshire, an annual conference, is one of such events to promote such activities in the region where different businesses have a chance to interact with one another.

The Yorkshire Mafia also organizes Leeds Business Week where different organizations from across the city joined up as "Event Partners" to organize their own business events in support of the exercise. Companies such as The Institute of Directors, 4Networking, Irwin Mitchell, Northern Ballet, Leeds City Council, Propaganda, Barclays were among the attendees.

Geoff Shepherd, chairman of The Yorkshire Mafia, said:

"Leeds is the third largest city in the UK. It should already have a well-established Business Week that brings its business community together. It doesn’t and being a can-do organisation we decided to lead the charge."

== See also ==
- Leeds Business School
- Leeds University Business School
