= Birstall Shopping Park =

Shopping centre in Birstall, England

- Location: Birstall, West Yorkshire, England
- Coordinates: 53°44′45.6″N 1°38′42″W
- Address: Birstall Shopping Park, Holden Ing Way, Birstall, Batley, West Yorkshire, WF17 9DT
- Developer: Pillar Properties Limited
- Manager: Denis Copeland
- Owner: The Birstall Co-ownership Trust (British Land, Hercules Unit Trust)
- Architect: Corstorphine & Wright (Main Body of Park)
- Num. of stores: 22
- Num. of anchor tenants: 3
- Floor area: 192,000 sq ft
- Floors: 1, with mezzanines
- Parking: 600
- Website: birstallshoppingpark.co.uk

Birstall Shopping Park is a shopping park located in Birstall, Batley, West Yorkshire, England. It contains a wide variety of retailers and includes the region's only IKEA store. Adjacent is another retail park, Junction 27 Retail Park, specialising in bulky goods and electronics. The section of the park containing retailers Pets at Home and Homesense is known as Spring Ram Retail Park, and was built slightly later than the rest of the complex but is under common ownership.

== Gallery ==
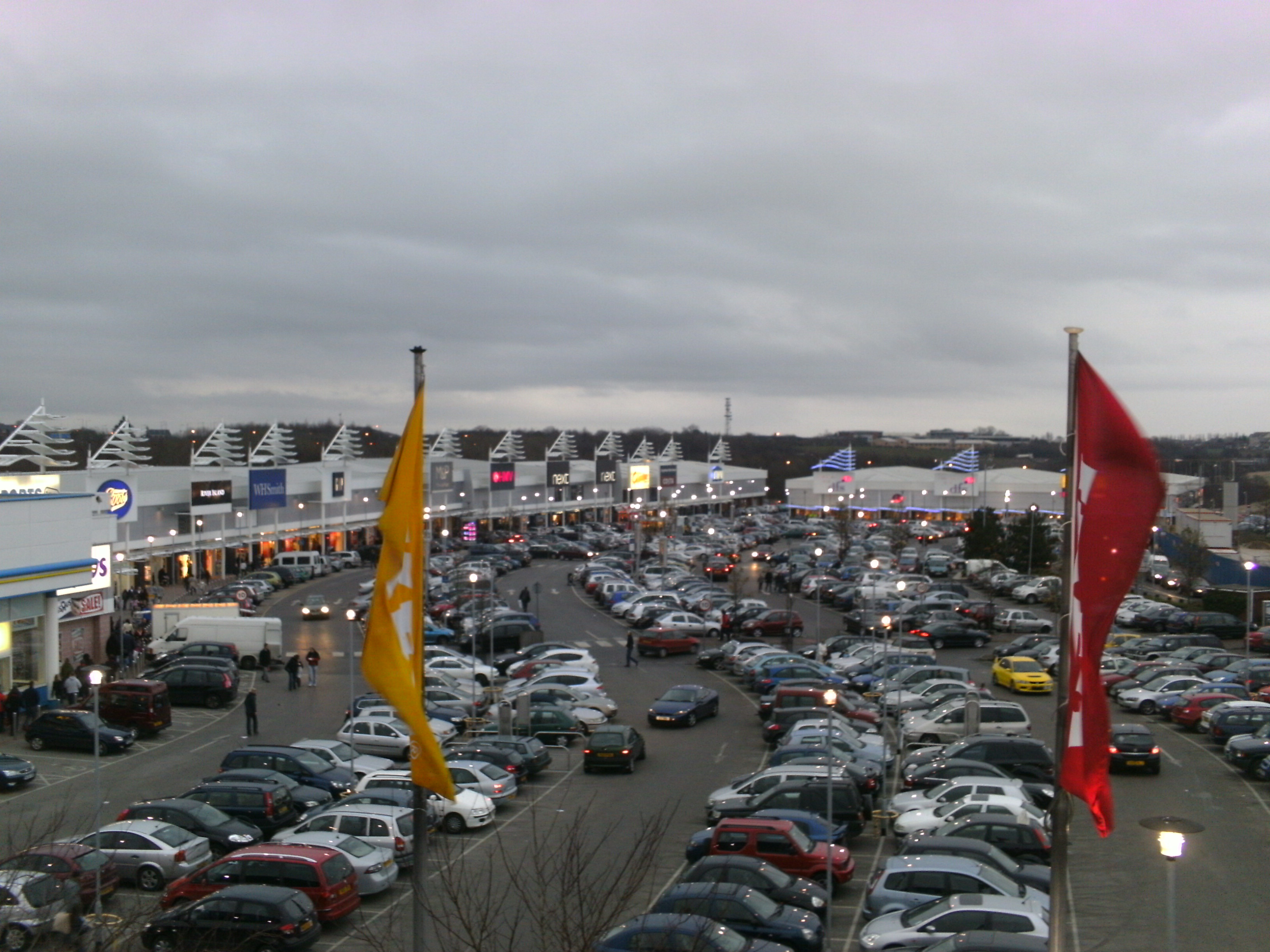
The main body of the retail park

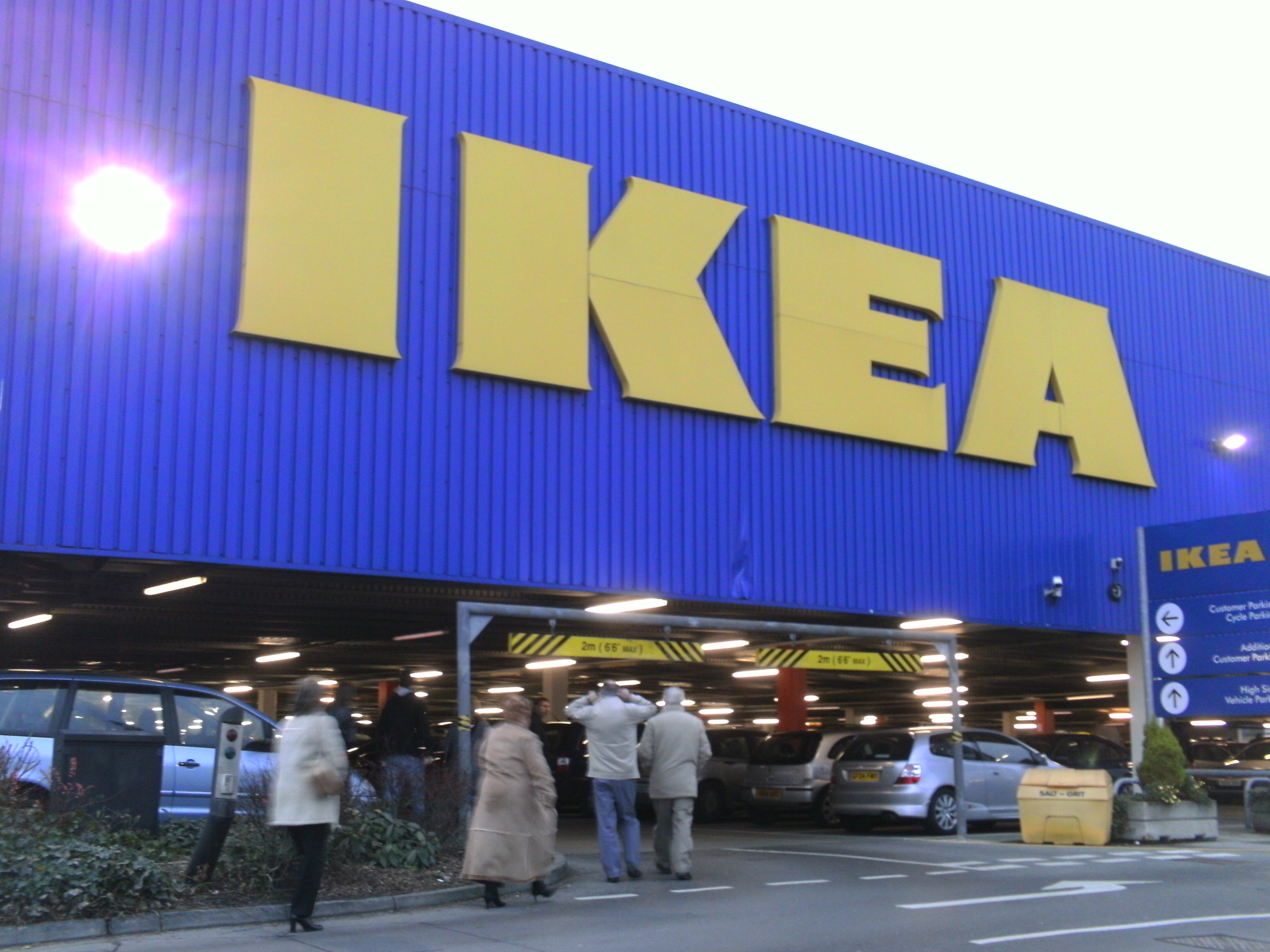
The Ikea multistorey car park
