= Birstall, West Yorkshire =

Market Town in West Yorkshire, England

Coordinates: 53.732°N 1.660°W

Birstall
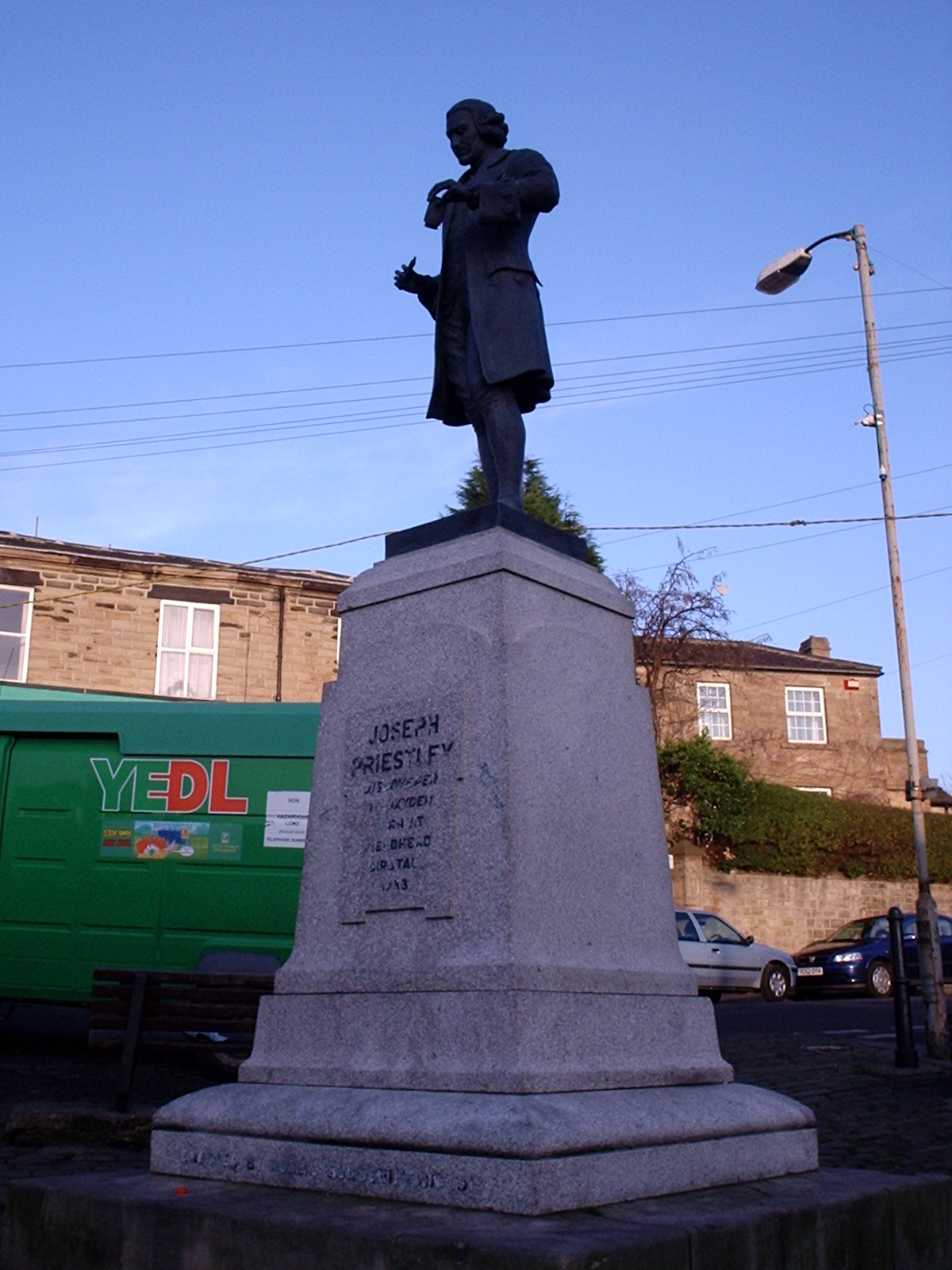
- Statue of Joseph Priestley in Birstall Market Place

- Location within West Yorkshire
- Population: 16,298 (Birstall & Birkenshaw Ward. 2011 census)
- OS grid reference: SE241242
- Metropolitan borough: Kirklees
- Metropolitan county: West Yorkshire
- Region: Yorkshire and the Humber
- Country: England
- Sovereign state: United Kingdom
- Post town: BATLEY
- Postcode district: WF17
- Dialling code: 01924
- Police: West Yorkshire
- Fire: West Yorkshire
- Ambulance: Yorkshire
- UK Parliament: Spen Valley

Birstall is a market and mill town in the metropolitan borough of Kirklees, West Yorkshire, England. It is part of the Birstall and Birkenshaw ward, which had a population of 16,298 at the 2011 census. Historically in the West Riding of Yorkshire, and part of the Heavy Woollen District, Birstall is approximately 6 miles (10 km) south-west of Leeds and situated close to the M62 motorway. The town is situated between Leeds, Bradford, Huddersfield and Wakefield.

== History ==
Birstall's name is derived from the Old English byrh and stall meaning a fortified site. The town is not mentioned in the Domesday Book but is alluded to as one of two settlements in Gomersal. Pigot's National Commercial Directory for 1828–29 listed it as one of the four villages which make up the township of Gomersal.

The hill fort itself would have been situated high above the town, to one side of the present-day Raikes Lane, which heads towards Gildersome, and onto Leeds. In prehistoric days, trackways ran in various directions from one British settlement to another, one such settlement being on the top of Birstall Hill. This site was chosen for its central location amongst the nearby waterways and its accessibility to and from other nearby hill forts, such as Castle Hill at Almondbury in Huddersfield and Barwick-in-Elmet, in Leeds. Following the course of Fieldhead Lane towards Drighlington is the Roman road of Tong Street. This location would give Birstall a great geographical advantage, making it within easy reach of the main thoroughfares of ancient Yorkshire.

A Roman tiled mosaic was unearthed at Birstall Smithies, a former early industrial slag smelting site, during excavations in 1965. This and a hoard of Roman coins discovered at the foot of Carr Lane, on what was then Birstall Recreation Ground indicate quite succinctly as to the prehistoric origins of Birstall. These coins, which were discovered in the 18th century, dated from 192 to 268 AD.

A quarter of a mile up the hill from Birstall on Leeds Road, there was once a Roman watch tower. This observation point was built on the ridge or "brae" of the hill. One side overlooked the Birstall area, while the other looked downwards from Howden Clough and the valley towards upland Morley. This watchtower was known in the early 20th century to the local inhabitants as the Brass Castle, a corruption of Brae Castle. It followed the line of other such structures built in West Yorkshire, atop prominent projecting ridges.

Birstall is the birthplace of Joseph Priestley, the discoverer of oxygen. Priestley was tutored extensively by the then Vicar of Birstall, an Edinburgh man with a keen interest in science. He was also a pupil at Batley Grammar School for Boys, founded in 1612 by the Rev. William Lee. The school still remains on Carlinghow Hill, approximately one mile from Birstall.

Also born in Birstall was John Nelson, a stonemason who was converted by John Wesley to Methodism whilst working in London and who returned to Birstall and became one of Wesley's most important preachers.

Birstall was prosperous before the Industrial Revolution, being within a small area that was a centre for the English white cloth industry. However, the Industrial Revolution saw extensive growth, and the architecture of the period still dominates today. The wider area became known as the Heavy Woollen District, although the decline in textile production has led to a decline in its usage; it is still used in local sport, however. Of this period is the cobbled marketplace with a statue of Priestley, which was erected in 1912 by public subscription and sculpted by Frances Darlington.

In 1866 the civil parish was abolished. In 1894 Birstall became an urban district, in 1894 Birstall became a civil parish again, being formed from the part of the parish of Gomersal in Birstall Urban District. On 1 April 1937 the district was abolished and merged with the Municipal Borough of Batley. On 1 April 1937 the parish was also abolished and merged with Batley. In 1931 the parish had a population of 7204. In 1974, Batley district, in turn, was merged into Kirklees when the metropolitan councils were formed.

On 16 June 2016, the local member of parliament Jo Cox was shot and stabbed in Birstall outside the library where she was due to hold a surgery for local constituents. She later died of her injuries.

== Community ==
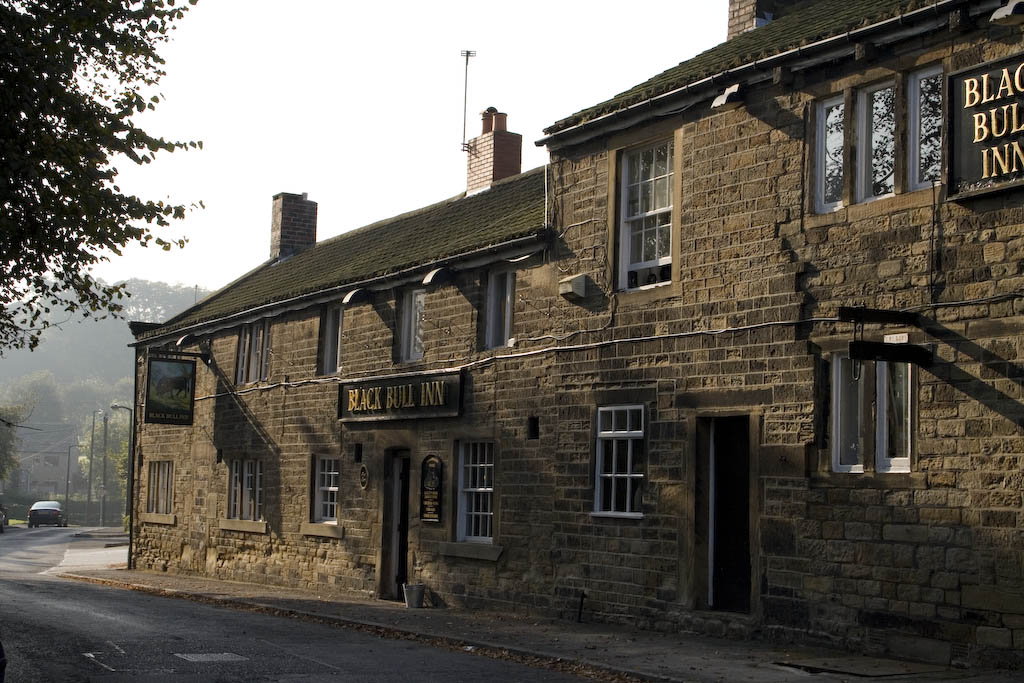
Black Bull public house

The town has two retail parks adjacent to Junction 27 of the M62, Birstall Shopping Park (also referred to as West Yorkshire Retail Park) and Junction 27 Retail Park.

Birstall contains a triangular-shaped Victorian marketplace, which replaced an earlier market on High Street in the Georgian area of the village. Market day is Thursday.

Birstall's community groups and traders organise the "Birstall in Bloom" project, which started in 2010. The local 'Chamber of Trade' promotes local businesses. Shops and outlets include a florist, baker's, butcher's, travel agent, pet shop, hair dresser's, nail bar, fish shop, Cafes and hot sandwich shops.

The Chamber of Trade organise the annual Christmas lights with a big switch on event on the last Tuesday in November.

=== Town centre improvements ===
In mid-2008, the local council's area committee invested £900,000 in refurbishing the Birstall marketplace and regenerating the town after a campaign by locals. The refurbishments were completed in December 2008 with most of the original cobbles being taken away and replaced with a level stone surface with randomly cobbled stripes.

== Landmarks ==
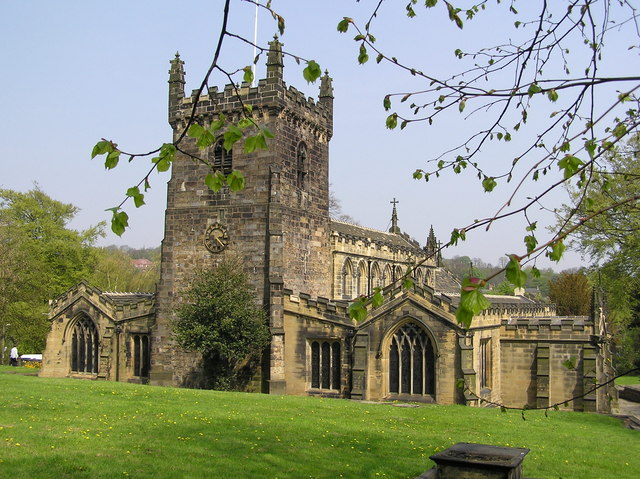
St. Peter's Church, Birstall

Birstall's St Peter's Church, on Kirkgate, dates to the time of Henry VIII, although the original tower is much earlier and may have been part of the original "Burgh Stall" or "Fortified Place". A family reconstitution of the parish registers of St Peter's, Birstall (1595–1812) was undertaken by Harvey Thwaite, and is one of the group of twenty-six family reconstitution studies that have been extensively used by the Cambridge Group for the History of Population and Social Structure.

Close to Birstall is Oakwell Hall, an Elizabethan manor house romanticised by Charlotte Brontë as 'Fieldhead' in her novel Shirley.

An 18th-century windmill stands in the grounds of Windmill Church of England Primary School (formerly St Saviour's Junior School) and has provided local names such as 'Windmill Estate' and 'Miller's Croft'.

The Black Bull Inn is situated opposite St Peter's Church. Its upstairs room was once used as a magistrate's court for Birstall and Gomersal, and is now Grade II listed. An external blue plaque notes a connection with the monks of Nostell Priory before the Reformation.
