= Gomersal =

Town in West Yorkshire, England

Coordinates: 53.73623°N 1.68824°W

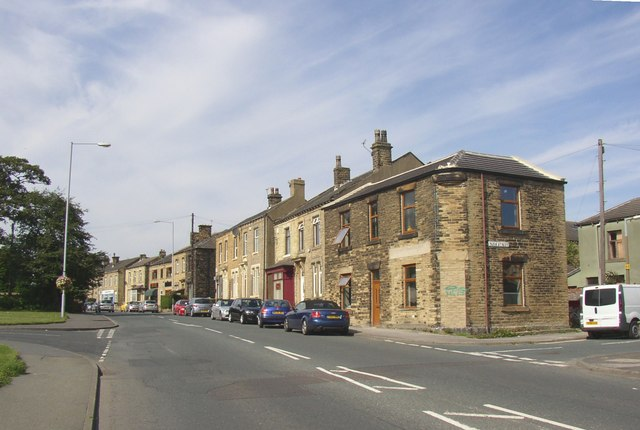

- Location within West Yorkshire
- Population: 15,000
- OS grid reference: SE206266
- Metropolitan borough: Kirklees
- Metropolitan county: West Yorkshire
- Region: Yorkshire and the Humber
- Country: England
- Sovereign state: United Kingdom
- Post town: CLECKHEATON
- Postcode district: BD19
- Dialling code: 01274
- Police: West Yorkshire
- Fire: West Yorkshire
- Ambulance: Yorkshire
- UK Parliament: Spen Valley

Gomersal is a village in the Kirklees district, in West Yorkshire, England. It is south of Bradford, south west of Leeds, east of Cleckheaton, and north of Heckmondwike. It is close to the River Spen and forms part of the Heavy Woollen District.

== History ==
Gomersal was attested in the Domesday Book (1086) with the name Gomershale. *Guthmers Halh, is a supposed place-name, not attested in any written document, hence marked with asterisk in The Concise Oxford Dictionary of English Place-names. The location was at a bend in the brook which passes through the valley bottom before joining with the River Calder. This land became an Anglo-Saxon burial ground and most likely was the location of a Celtic temple site before the Roman Conquest. It became the site of the Parish Church of St Peter and St Paul, now known as St Peters. The brook formed the ancient boundary between Gomersal and Birstall.

The Luddite riots, that occurred in the area in 1812 provided Charlotte Brontë with material for her novel Shirley. Gomersal was the hometown of her friend Mary Taylor who lived at the Red House which she renamed Briarmains in the novel.

The Taylor Family also lived in Spen Hall, a residence in the Lower Spen area of Gomersal. Spen Hall has been divided into several houses but retains a 16th-century mullioned window, a tennis lawn and a water spring which, according to myth, is a tunnel (now flooded) leading to the Old Saw public house cellar nearby. The cellar was apparently used to hide priests fleeing persecution.

Clay pipes were found in the earlier Old Saw premises in the walls and chimneys but, once exhumed, disintegrated. A glazed drinking cup found in the foundations survives after being carefully reassembled and preserved by Harry King, the former owner of the cottage. The cup still requires dating. A hand-made brick-lined pit two feet (60 cm) deep was also discovered on the site. Its uses are disputed, with suggestions that it was a cockfighting pit or meat storage vessel.

Gomersal also has many fine and historic houses which climb the hill of Spen Lane and along Oxford Road towards Birkenshaw. Houses such as Spen Hall, Spen House (now demolished and rebuilt, except the Coach House), High Rising (High Royd, another Taylor Household) now The Gomersal Hotel, Tanfield House, Firdene (currently on the market for £1.25 million), Hilltop House (now split into two homes with apartment buildings in the grounds), Gomers Hall (apparently, originally Gothmers Hall, which was demolished to build an electricity sub-station), Pollard Hall (home of the mill owner Thomas Burnley), Red House (now Red House Museum), Broadyards, Croft House, Sigston House, Gomersal Hall, Peel House, West House (the last three still privately owned).

The Roundhill Mill site in the Cliffe lane area of Gomersal is known for the sighting of the scratje (pronounced Skrayty), a legendary Norse spirit supposedly observed by a son before the death of his father and characterised by a cold and apparently sourceless light which moves erratically. The old name for Cliffe Lane was Scrat Lane.

Gomersal was heavily wooded up to the late 19th century with Swinley Great Wood, Lanes Wood, Scotland (Fusden) Wood containing the Taylor family burial ground, and Church Wood between the Hill Top and Monk Ings.

During the Second World War, Gomersal had a number of public air raid shelters, with quite a few remaining in 2007 at Birkenshaw roundabout Park, Gomersal First School, Hill Top. This was likely due to the semi-underground control bunker for the anti-aircraft guns in the West Riding, protecting Leeds, Bradford, Huddersfield and Halifax. The bunker was in the grounds of Oakroyd Hall, making this a target for the German Luftwaffe; Oakroyd Hall is now the headquarters of the West Yorkshire Fire and Rescue Service.

There was also a Royal Observer Corps "Orlit" type surface observation post on the Popeley Fields around 1/3 mile (500 metres) from the Gomersal Cricket ground. This was active throughout the war and staffed day and night. In the 1960s on the same site a nuclear-blast-proof underground bunker was constructed as a monitoring post, one of over 1,500 constructed in the UK, for use in measuring direction, strength of blast and fallout in the event of the UK coming under nuclear attack. The ROC stood down during the late 1980s with the reduced threat of the Cold War and the bunkers were abandoned and sold or given back to the land owners.

Gomersal was formerly a township and chapelry in the parish of Birstall. In 1866 Gomersal became a separate civil parish, in 1894 Gomersal became an urban district, and on 1 April 1915 the district was abolished to form Spenborough Urban District. On 1 April 1974 the parish was abolished. In 1951 the parish had a population of 7951.

== Railway ==
The Lower Spen area of Gomersal had a railway station, Cleckheaton Spen on the LNWR railway line diversion loop linking Leeds and Manchester and improving the main line capacity between Huddersfield and Leeds. The line was constructed between 1894 and 1902 and opened fully to passengers in 1904. It had some spectacular civil engineering for the time, including rail viaducts at Mirfield and Heckmondwike, a 90-foot-high (27 m) pedestrian road viaduct linking Cleckheaton town centre with the station and goods yard. The Gomersal Tunnel is 890 yards (810 m) long and around 30 feet (9 m) deep, directly under the Shoulder of Mutton pub in Oxford Road at Great Gomersal (the LNWR bought the pub in 1897 in case it fell into the tunnel workings) and then the line opened into Gomersal Station in Moor Lane, a four-minute train ride from Cleckheaton Spen.

The railway closed to passengers in 1964 and goods in 1966, having had all the buildings and structures repainted and new track in 1963. In 1952, Sir Winston Churchill, then Prime Minister, slept at Cleckheaton Spen sidings overnight in a special train with a heavy security cordon during election campaigning.

== Places of worship ==
Gomersal has a number of places of worship given the size of population, including Gomersal St Mary C of E Church (1851), the Methodist Wesleyan Chapel, Latham Lane 1827, Grove Congregational Chapel in Oxford Road, the Methodist Free United Chapel (off Reform Street), the Primitive Methodist Chapel in Moor Lane, the Moravian Chapel in Little Gomersal and Little Gomersal Methodist Chapel on Town Hill. Most are still in use.

John Wesley preached in Gomersal. One of his closest lay assistants John Nelson was involved with lay preacher Edward Brooke who initiated the construction the Wesleyan Chapel in Latham Lane in 1827. Its unusual bow front led to it being known as the "pork pie chapel".

== Street and locality names ==
Gomersal also has some interesting street and place names, for example Mazy Brook (Mazebrook), Drub, Birdacre, Bleak Street, Wood Nook, Throstle Nest, Egypt, Worlds End, Fusden Lane, Monk Ings, Nutter Lane, Muffit Lane, Garfit Hill, and Nibshaw Lane.

Gomersal also has a football club, Gomersal & Cleckheaton F.C., ranging from ages 6 to 17 and their traditional colours are red and black stripes.

Gomersal was once home to Burnleys Textile Mill, which was a landmark in the Spenborough area. However, this has been demolished to make way for a new housing development of up to 300 homes. Gomersal has two primary schools; Gomersal Primary School and St Mary's First School.

== Notable people ==
New Zealand photographer Henry Winkelmann's family moved to Follingworth House in 1865. The composer Arnold Cooke was born in Gomersal in 1906. Gomersal is the birthplace of novelist John Barlow, who has set several works of fiction in the village.

== See also ==
- Listed buildings in Liversedge and Gomersal
