= List of Yorkshire County Cricket Club grounds =

Yorkshire County Cricket Club was established on 8 January 1863; prior to that an informal county organisation had existed before, and had occasionally appeared in first-class cricket, typically playing as Sheffield. It has since played first-class cricket from 1863, List A cricket from 1963 and Twenty20 cricket from 2003, using a different number of home grounds during that time. Great Horton Road in Bradford played host to the club's inaugural home first-class fixture in 1863 against Nottinghamshire, while a century later its first home List A fixture was played at Acklam Park in Middlesbrough against the same opponents, and forty years later the club's first home Twenty20 fixture was played at Headingley against Derbyshire. Yorkshire have played home matches at 21 grounds, but today play the majority of their home fixtures at Headingley, which also holds Test, One Day International and Twenty20 International cricket matches. The club's original home ground at Bramall Lane also held one Test match in 1902.

The 23 grounds that Yorkshire have used for home matches since 1863 are listed below, with statistics complete through to the end of the 2014 season.

== Grounds ==
Below is a complete list of grounds used by Yorkshire County Cricket Club in first-class, List A and Twenty20 matches.

| Name | Location | First | Last | Matches | First | Last | Matches | First | Last | Matches | Refs |
| Name | Location | First-class | | | List A | | | Twenty20 | | | Refs |
|---|---|---|---|---|---|---|---|---|---|---|---|
| Great Horton Road | Bradford | 22 June 1863 v Nottinghamshire | 10 August 1874 v Lancashire | 8 | – | – | 0 | – | – | 0 | |
| Bramall Lane | Sheffield | 27 July 1863 v Surrey | 4 August 1973 v Lancashire | 393 | 20 July 1969 v Derbyshire | 24 June 1973 v Leicestershire | 5 | – | – | 0 | (Note: Only the first-class matches played by Yorkshire at the ground after 1863 are recorded in the table.) |
| Swatter's Carr | Middlesbrough | 19 September 1863 v Kent | 2 September 1867 v Lancashire | 2 | – | – | 0 | – | – | 0 | |
| Dewsbury and Savile Ground | Dewsbury | 25 July 1867 v Cambridgeshire | 17 May 1933 v Essex | 53 | – | – | 0 | – | – | 0 | |
| Recreation Ground | Holbeck | 9 July 1868 v Lancashire | 26 August 1886 v Derbyshire | 3 | – | – | 0 | – | – | 0 | (Note: Only the first-class matches played by Yorkshire at the ground are recorded in the table.) |
| Woodhouse Hill Ground | Hunslet | only match: 12 July 1869 v Cambridgeshire | | 1 | – | – | 0 | – | – | 0 | (Note: Only the first-class match played by Yorkshire at the ground is recorded in the table.) |
| Fartown Ground | Huddersfield | 28 August 1873 v Nottinghamshire | 17 August 1955 v Gloucestershire | 72 | 1 June 1969 v Sussex | 9 May 1982 v Worcestershire | 9 | – | – | 0 | (Note: Only the first-class matches played by Yorkshire at the ground are recorded in the table.) |
| North Marine Road Ground | Scarborough | 7 September 1874 v Middlesex | 22 August 2024 v Sussex | 265 | 30 July 1969 v Nottinghamshire | 8 August 2024 v Leicestershire | 102 | 10 July 2011 v Durham | 30 June 2013 v Durham | 3 | (Note: Only the first-class and List A matches played by Yorkshire at the ground are recorded in the table.) |
| College Grove Ground Pavilion End | Wakefield | only match: 13 June 1878 v Sussex | | 1 | – | – | 0 | – | – | 0 | |
| Argyle Street | Hull | only match: 12 June 1879 v Surrey | | 1 | – | – | 0 | – | – | 0 | (Note: Only the first-class matches played by Yorkshire at the ground are recorded in the table.) |
| Park Avenue | Bradford | 13 June 1881 v Kent | 20 June 1996 v Leicestershire | 307 | 31 August 1969 v Northamptonshire | 23 June 1996 v Leicestershire | 48 | – | – | 0 | (Note: Only the first-class matches played by Yorkshire at the ground are recorded in the table.) |
| Linthorpe Road West Ground | Middlesbrough | only match: 20 July 1882 v Australians | | 1 | – | – | 0 | – | – | 0 | |
| Hall Park Ground | Horsforth | only match: 20 July 1885 v MB Hawke's XI | | 1 | – | – | 0 | – | – | 0 | |
| Thrum Hall | Halifax | 30 July 1888 v Gloucestershire | 10 June 1897 v Kent | 4 | – | – | 0 | – | – | 0 | |
| Wigginton Road | York | only match: 9 June 1890 v Kent | | 1 | – | – | 0 | – | – | 0 | |
| Headingley | Leeds | 24 August 1891 v Kent | 26 September 2023 v Worcestershire | 485 | 29 June 1969 v Worcestershire | 6 May 2019 v Durham | 275 | 14 June 2003 v Derbyshire | 22 June 2023 v Birmingham Bears | 110 | (Note: Only the first-class and List A matches played by Yorkshire at the ground are recorded in the table.) |
| St George's Road | Harrogate | 16 August 1894 v Leicestershire | 18 July 1996 v Hampshire | 91 | 25 April 1970 v Surrey | 30 June 1973 v Durham | 4 | – | – | 0 | (Note: Only the first-class and List A matches played by Yorkshire at the ground are recorded in the table.) |
| The Circle | Hull | 10 July 1899 v Somerset | 6 July 1974 v Worcestershire | 88 | 22 June 1969 v Essex | 10 June 1990 v Surrey | 19 | – | – | 0 | (Note: Only the first-class matches played by Yorkshire at the ground are recorded in the table.) |
| Acklam Park | Middlesbrough | 28 July 1956 v Glamorgan | 6 June 1996 v Surrey | 45 | 22 May 1963 v Nottinghamshire | 2 July 1995 v Gloucestershire | 24 | – | – | 0 | |
| Savile Park | Castleford | – | – | 0 | only match: 25 May 1967 v Cambridgeshire | | 1 | – | – | 0 | (Note: The Marylebone Cricket Club played a List A match here against the touring Zimbabweans in 2000. Only the List A match played by Yorkshire at the ground is recorded in the table.) |
| Abbeydale Park | Sheffield | 22 May 1974 v Warwickshire | 9 May 1996 v Derbyshire | 41 | 10 June 1982 v Zimbabweans | 12 May 1996 v Derbyshire | 12 | – | – | 0 | |
| Shaw Lane | Barnsley | only match: 25 August 1862 v All England Eleven | | 1 | 21 May 1975 v Nottinghamshire | 13 May 1978 v Surrey | 4 | – | – | 0 | |
| Clifton Park | York | 17 June 2019 v Warwickshire | 17 June 2019 v Warwickshire | 1 | 3 August 2021 v Warwickshire | 17 August 2023 v Hampshire | 6 | – | – | 0 | |
| Riverside Ground | Chester-le-Street | – | – | 0 | – | – | 0 | 24 August 2021 v Sussex | 24 August 2021 v Sussex | 1 | |
