= Harry Turner =

Harry Turner may refer to:

- Harry Turner (Australian politician) (1905–1988)
- Harry Turner (American football) (died 1914), professional football player
- Harry Turner (boxer) (1894–1976), Canadian Olympic boxer
- Harry Turner (cricketer) (1879—1939), English cricketer
- Harry Turner (footballer) (1882–1967), English footballer with Southampton FC in the early 20th century
- Harry E. Turner (1927–2004), member of the Ohio House of Representatives
- Harry Moreton Stanley Turner (1875–1951), senior physician to the RAF
- Harry Turner, leader of the Turnerites within Trotskyist politics in the United States of America

== See also ==
- Harold Turner (disambiguation)
- Henry Turner (disambiguation)
