= Electoral history of Boris Johnson =

Elections featuring UK Prime Minister

Boris Johnson was a member of Parliament for Uxbridge and South Ruislip from 2015 to 2023 and was the prime Minister of the United Kingdom from 2019 to 2022. He also served as the mayor of London from 2008 to 2016 and the foreign secretary from 2016 to 2018.

== Parliamentary elections ==
=== 1997 general election, Clwyd South ===
General election 1997: Clwyd South
| Party | Candidate | Votes | % | ±% |
|---|---|---|---|---|
| Labour | Martyn Jones | 22,901 | 58.1 | N/A |
| Conservative | Boris Johnson | 9,091 | 23.1 | N/A |
| Liberal Democrats | Andrew Chadwick | 3,684 | 9.4 | N/A |
| Plaid Cymru | Gareth Williams | 2,500 | 6.3 | N/A |
| Referendum | Alex Lewis | 1,207 | 3.1 | N/A |
| Majority | | 13,810 | 35.0 | N/A |
| Turnout | | 39,383 | 73.6 | N/A |
| Registered electors | | 53,495 | | |
| Labour win (new seat) | | | | |

=== 2001 general election, Henley ===
General election 2001: Henley
| Party | Candidate | Votes | % | ±% |
|---|---|---|---|---|
| Conservative | Boris Johnson | 20,466 | 46.1 | −0.3 |
| Liberal Democrats | Catherine Bearder | 12,008 | 27.0 | +2.3 |
| Labour | Janet Matthews | 9,367 | 21.1 | −1.6 |
| UKIP | Philip Collings | 1,413 | 3.2 | New |
| Green | Oliver Tickell | 1,147 | 2.6 | +1.6 |
| Majority | | 8,458 | 19.1 | −2.6 |
| Turnout | | 44,401 | 64.3 | −13.3 |
| Conservative hold | | Swing | −1.3 | |

=== 2005 general election, Henley ===
General election 2005: Henley
| Party | Candidate | Votes | % | ±% |
|---|---|---|---|---|
| Conservative | Boris Johnson | 24,894 | 53.5 | +7.4 |
| Liberal Democrats | David Turner | 12,101 | 26.0 | −1.0 |
| Labour | Kaleem Saeed | 6,862 | 14.7 | −6.4 |
| Green | Mark Stevenson | 1,518 | 3.3 | +0.7 |
| UKIP | Delphine Gray-Fisk | 1,162 | 2.5 | −0.7 |
| Majority | | 12,793 | 27.5 | +8.4 |
| Turnout | | 46,537 | 67.9 | +3.6 |
| Conservative hold | | Swing | +4.2 | |

=== 2015 general election, Uxbridge and South Ruislip ===
General election 2015: Uxbridge and South Ruislip
| Party | Candidate | Votes | % | ±% |
|---|---|---|---|---|
| Conservative | Boris Johnson | 22,511 | 50.2 | +1.9 |
| Labour | Chris Summers | 11,816 | 26.4 | +3.0 |
| UKIP | Jack Duffin | 6,346 | 14.2 | +11.5 |
| Liberal Democrats | Michael Cox | 2,215 | 4.9 | –14.9 |
| Green | Graham Lee | 1,414 | 3.2 | +2.1 |
| TUSC | Gary Harbord | 180 | 0.4 | N/A |
| Independent | Jenny Thompson | 84 | 0.2 | N/A |
| Monster Raving Loony | Howling Laud Hope | 72 | 0.2 | N/A |
| Communities United | Sabrina Moosun | 52 | 0.1 | N/A |
| The Eccentric Party of Great Britain (UK) | Lord Toby Jug | 50 | 0.1 | N/A |
| Independent | Michael Doherty | 39 | 0.1 | N/A |
| The Realists' Party | Jane Lawrence | 18 | 0.0 | N/A |
| Independent | James Jackson | 14 | 0.0 | N/A |
| Majority | | 10,695 | 23.8 | –1.1 |
| Turnout | | 44,811 | 63.4 | +0.1 |
| Registered electors | | 70,631 | | |
| Conservative hold | | Swing | –0.5 | |

=== 2017 general election, Uxbridge and South Ruislip ===
General election 2017: Uxbridge and South Ruislip
| Party | Candidate | Votes | % | ±% |
|---|---|---|---|---|
| Conservative | Boris Johnson | 23,716 | 50.8 | +0.6 |
| Labour | Vincent Lo | 18,682 | 40.0 | +13.6 |
| Liberal Democrats | Rosina Robson | 1,835 | 3.9 | –1.0 |
| UKIP | Lizzy Kemp | 1,577 | 3.4 | –10.8 |
| Green | Mark Keir | 884 | 1.9 | –1.3 |
| Majority | | 5,034 | 10.8 | –13.0 |
| Turnout | | 46,694 | 66.8 | +3.4 |
| Registered electors | | 69,936 | | |
| Conservative hold | | Swing | –6.5 | |

=== 2019 general election, Uxbridge and South Ruislip ===
General election 2019: Uxbridge and South Ruislip
| Party | Candidate | Votes | % | ±% |
|---|---|---|---|---|
| Conservative | Boris Johnson | 25,351 | 52.6 | +1.8 |
| Labour | Ali Milani | 18,141 | 37.6 | –2.4 |
| Liberal Democrats | Joanne Humphreys | 3,026 | 6.3 | +2.4 |
| Green | Mark Keir | 1,090 | 2.2 | +0.3 |
| UKIP | Geoffrey Courtenay | 283 | 0.6 | –2.8 |
| Monster Raving Loony | Lord Buckethead | 125 | 0.3 | N/A |
| Independent | Count Binface | 69 | 0.1 | N/A |
| Independent | Alfie Utting | 44 | 0.1 | N/A |
| | Yace "Interplanetary Time Lord" Yogenstein | 23 | 0.0 | N/A |
| Independent | Norma Burke | 22 | 0.0 | N/A |
| | Bobby Smith | 8 | 0.0 | N/A |
| | William Tobin | 5 | 0.0 | N/A |
| Majority | | 7,210 | 15.0 | +4.2 |
| Turnout | | 48,187 | 68.5 | +1.7 |
| Registered electors | | 70,369 | | |
| Conservative hold | | Swing | +2.1 | |

== Mayoral elections ==
=== 2008 London mayoral election ===
Mayor of London election 1 May 2008
| Party | Candidate | 1st round | | 2nd round | | | 1st round votesTransfer votes, 2nd round |
| Party | Candidate | Total | Of round | Transfers | Total | Of round | 1st round votesTransfer votes, 2nd round |
|---|---|---|---|---|---|---|---|
| Conservative | Boris Johnson | 1,043,761 | 43.2% | 124,977 | 1,168,738 | 53.2% | |
| Labour | Ken Livingstone | 893,877 | 37.0% | 134,089 | 1,027,966 | 46.8% | |
| Liberal Democrats | Brian Paddick | 236,685 | 9.8% | | | | |
| Green | Siân Berry | 77,347 | 3.2% | | | | |
| BNP | Richard Barnbrook | 69,710 | 2.9% | | | | |
| CPA | Alan Craig | 39,249 | 1.6% | | | | |
| UKIP | Gerard Batten | 22,422 | 0.9% | | | | |
| Left List | Lindsey German | 16,796 | 0.7% | | | | |
| English Democrat | Matt O'Connor | 10,695 | 0.4% | | | | |
| Independent | Winston McKenzie | 5,389 | 0.2% | | | | |
| Conservative gain from Labour | | | | | | | |

=== 2012 London mayoral election ===
Mayor of London election 3 May 2012
| Party | Candidate | 1st round | | 2nd round | | | 1st round votesTransfer votes, 2nd round |
| Party | Candidate | Total | Of round | Transfers | Total | Of round | 1st round votesTransfer votes, 2nd round |
|---|---|---|---|---|---|---|---|
| Conservative | Boris Johnson | 971,931 | 44.0% | 82,880 | 1,054,811 | 51.5% | |
| Labour | Ken Livingstone | 889,918 | 40.3% | 102,355 | 992,273 | 48.5% | |
| Green | Jenny Jones | 98,913 | 4.5% | | | | |
| Liberal Democrats | Brian Paddick | 91,774 | 4.2% | | | | |
| Independent | Siobhan Benita | 83,914 | 3.8% | | | | |
| UKIP | Lawrence Webb | 43,274 | 2.0% | | | | |
| BNP | Carlos Gerardo Cortiglia | 28,751 | 1.3% | | | | |
| Conservative hold | | | | | | | |

== 2019 Conservative Party leadership election ==
| Candidate | First ballot: 13 June 2019 | | Second ballot: 18 June 2019 | | | Third ballot: 19 June 2019 | | | Fourth ballot: 20 June 2019 | | | Fifth ballot: 20 June 2019 | | | Members' vote: 6-22 July 2019 | | |
| Candidate | Votes | % | Votes | ± | % | Votes | ± | % | Votes | ± | % | Votes | ± | % | Votes | % | % Votes Cast |
|---|---|---|---|---|---|---|---|---|---|---|---|---|---|---|---|---|---|
| Boris Johnson | 114 | 36.4 | 126 | ▲12 | 40.3 | 143 | ▲17 | 45.7 | 157 | ▲14 | 50.2 | 160 | ▲3 | 51.1 | 92,153 | 57.8 | 66.4 |
| Jeremy Hunt | 43 | 13.7 | 46 | ▲3 | 14.7 | 54 | ▲8 | 17.3 | 59 | ▲5 | 18.8 | 77 | ▲18 | 24.6 | 46,656 | 29.3 | 33.6 |
| Michael Gove | 37 | 11.8 | 41 | ▲4 | 13.1 | 51 | ▲10 | 16.3 | 61 | ▲10 | 19.5 | 75 | ▲14 | 24.0 | Eliminated | | |
| Sajid Javid | 23 | 7.3 | 33 | ▲10 | 10.5 | 38 | ▲5 | 12.1 | 34 | ▼4 | 10.9 | Eliminated | | | | | |
| Rory Stewart | 19 | 6.1 | 37 | ▲18 | 11.8 | 27 | ▼10 | 8.6 | Eliminated | | | | | | | | |
| Dominic Raab | 27 | 8.6 | 30 | ▲3 | 9.6 | Eliminated | | | | | | | | | | | |
| Matt Hancock | 20 | 6.4 | Withdrew | | | | | | | | | | | | | | |
| Andrea Leadsom | 11 | 3.5 | Eliminated | | | | | | | | | | | | | | |
| Mark Harper | 10 | 3.2 | Eliminated | | | | | | | | | | | | | | |
| Esther McVey | 9 | 2.9 | Eliminated | | | | | | | | | | | | | | |
| Votes cast (Note: Due to rounding errors the sum of percentages may deviate.) | 313 | 100.0 | 313 | Steady | 100.0 | 313 | Steady | 100.0 | 313 | Steady | 100.0 | 313 | Steady | 100.0 | 139,318 | 87.4 | 100 |
| Spoilt ballots | 0 | 0.0 | 0 | Steady | 0.0 | 0 | Steady | 0.0 | 2 | ▲2 | 0.6 | 1 | ▼1 | 0.3 | 509 | 0.3 | |
| Abstentions | 0 | 0 | 0 | Steady | 0 | 0 | Steady | 0 | 0 | Steady | 0 | 0 | Steady | 0 | 20,085 | 12.6 | |
| Registered Voters | 313 | 100.0 | 313 | Steady | 100.0 | 313 | Steady | 100.0 | 313 | Steady | 100.0 | 313 | Steady | 100.0 | 159,403 | 100.0 | |

View source data.

== 2019 United Kingdom general election ==
Results of the December 2019 general election to the House of Commons of the United Kingdom
| Political party | Leader | Candidates | MPs | | | | | Votes | | |
| Political party | Leader | Candidates | Total | Gained | Lost | Net | Of total (%) | Total | Of total (%) | Change (%) |
|---|---|---|---|---|---|---|---|---|---|---|
| Conservative | Boris Johnson | 635 | 365 | 58 | 10 | ▲48 | 56.2 | 13,966,454 | 43.63 | +1.2 |
| Labour | Jeremy Corbyn | 631 (Note: Includes 50 Co-operative Party candidates, as part of the Labour-Co-op alliance) | 202 (Note: Includes 26 Co-operative Party MPs, as part of the Labour-Co-op alliance) | 1 | 61 (Note: Includes 12 Co-operative Party MPs, as part of the Labour-Co-op alliance) | ▼60 (Note: Includes -12 Co-operative Party MPs, as part of the Labour-Co-op alliance) | 31.1 (Note: Includes 4.0% for the Co-operative Party, as part of the Labour-Co-op alliance) | 10,269,051 (Note: Includes 1,025,882 for the Co-operative Party, as part of the Labour-Co-op alliance) | 32.08 (Note: Includes 3.2% for the Co-operative Party, as part of the Labour-Co-op alliance) | −7.9 (Note: Includes -1.0% for the Co-operative Party, as part of the Labour-Co-op alliance) |
| Liberal Democrats | Jo Swinson | 611 | 11 | 3 | 4 | ▼1 | 1.7 | 3,696,419 | 11.55 | +4.2 |
| Scottish National Party | Nicola Sturgeon | 59 | 48 | 14 | 1 | ▲13 | 7.4 | 1,242,380 | 3.88 | +0.8 |
| Green Party of England and Wales | Siân Berry and Jonathan Bartley | 472 | 1 | 0 | 0 | 0 | 0.2 | 835,597 | 2.61 | +1.1 |
| Brexit Party | Nigel Farage | 275 | | | | | | 644,257 | 2.01 | |
| DUP | Arlene Foster | 17 | 8 | 0 | 2 | ▼2 | 1.2 | 244,128 | 0.76 | −0.1 |
| Sinn Féin | Mary Lou McDonald | 15 | 7 | 1 | 1 | 0 | 1.1 | 181,853 | 0.57 | −0.2 |
| Plaid Cymru | Adam Price | 36 | 4 | 0 | 0 | 0 | 0.6 | 153,265 | 0.48 | 0.0 |
| Alliance | Naomi Long | 18 | 1 | 1 | 0 | ▲1 | 0.2 | 134,115 | 0.42 | +0.2 |
| SDLP | Colum Eastwood | 15 | 2 | 2 | 0 | ▲2 | 0.3 | 118,737 | 0.37 | +0.1 |
| UUP | Steve Aiken | 16 | | | | | | 93,123 | 0.29 | 0.0 |
| Yorkshire | Christopher Whitwood | 28 | | | | | | 29,201 | 0.09 | 0.0 |
| Scottish Greens | Patrick Harvie & Lorna Slater | 22 | | | | | | 28,122 | 0.09 | |
| Speaker | Lindsay Hoyle | 1 | 1 | 1 | 1 | 0 | 0.2 | 26,831 | 0.08 | 0.0 |
| UKIP | Patricia Mountain (interim) | 44 | | | | | | 22,817 | 0.07 | −1.8 |
| Ashfield Ind. | Jason Zadrozny | 1 | | | | | | 13,498 | 0.04 | 0.0 |
| Liberal | Steve Radford | 19 | | | | | | 10,876 | 0.03 | 0.0 |
| The Independent Group for Change | Anna Soubry | 3 | | | | | | 10,006 | 0.03 | |
| Aontú | Peadar Tóibín | 7 | | | | | | 9,814 | 0.03 | |
| Monster Raving Loony | Howling Laud Hope | 24 | | | | | | 9,739 | 0.03 | 0.0 |
| People Before Profit | Collective | 2 | | | | | | 7,526 | 0.02 | |
| Birkenhead Social Justice | Frank Field | 1 | | | | | | 7,285 | 0.02 | |
| CPA | Sidney Cordle | 29 | | | | | | 6,486 | 0.02 | 0.0 |
| Heavy Woollen Independents | Aleksandar Lukic | 1 | | | | | | 6,432 | 0.02 | |
| SDP | William Clouston | 20 | | | | | | 3,295 | 0.01 | 0.0 |
| Animal Welfare | Vanessa Hudson | 6 | | | | | | 3,086 | 0.01 | 0.0 |
| North East | Mark Burdon | 2 | | | | | | 2,637 | 0.01 | |
| Lincolnshire Independent | Marianne Overton | 1 | | | | | | 1,999 | 0.01 | |
| Green Party Northern Ireland | Clare Bailey | 3 | | | | | | 1,996 | 0.01 | |
| English Democrat | Robin Tilbrook | 5 | | | | | | 1,987 | 0.01 | 0.0 |
| Libertarian | Adam Brown | 6 | | | | | | 1,780 | 0.01 | 0.0 |
| Mebyon Kernow | Dick Cole | 1 | | | | | | 1,660 | 0.01 | 0.0 |
| Proud of Oldham and Saddleworth | Paul Errock | 2 | | | | | | 1,606 | 0.01 | |
| Independent Network | Ian Stephens | 1 | | | | | | 1,542 | 0.0 | |
| Gwlad | Gwyn Wigley Evans | 3 | | | | | | 1,515 | 0.00 | |
| Cynon Valley | Andrew Chainey | 1 | | | | | | 1,322 | 0.00 | |
| VPP | Robin Horsfall | 2 | | | | | | 1,219 | 0.00 | |
| Burnley and Padiham Party | Mark Payne | 1 | | | | | | 1,162 | 0.00 | |
| Shropshire Party | Robert Jones | 1 | | | | | | 1,141 | 0.00 | |
| Putting Cumbria First | Jonathan Davies | 1 | | | | | | 1,070 | 0.00 | |
| Peace | John Morris | 2 | | | | | | 960 | 0.00 | |
| Wycombe Independents | Matt Knight | 1 | | | | | | 926 | 0.00 | |
| JAC | Donald Jerrard | 3 | | | | | | 728 | 0.00 | |
| Christian | Jeff Green | 2 | | | | | | 705 | 0.00 | 0.0 |
| Renew | Julie Girling | 4 | | | | | | 545 | 0.00 | 0.0 |
| Workers Revolutionary | Joshua Ogunleye | 5 | | | | | | 524 | 0.00 | 0.0 |
| BNP | Adam Walker | 1 | | | | | | 510 | 0.00 | 0.0 |
| Parties with fewer than 500 votes each | | 40 | | | | | | 5,697 | 0.02 | |
| Independent (non-party) candidates | | 224 | | | 1 | ▼1 | | 206,486 | 0.64 | |
| Blank and invalid votes | | | | | | | | 117,919 | — | — |
| Total | | 3320 | 650 | | | 0 | 100 | 32,014,110 | 100 | 0.0 |
| Registered voters, and turnout | | | | | | | | 47,587,254 | 67.52 | −1.3 |
