= Batley and Spen by-election =

Batley and Spen by-election may refer to two by-elections in the UK:

- 2016 Batley and Spen by-election following the murder of Jo Cox
- 2021 Batley and Spen by-election following the resignation of Tracy Brabin
