= Jo Cox =

British politician (1974–2016)

- Cox in 2015

Member of Parliament for Batley and Spen
- In office 7 May 2015 – 16 June 2016
- Preceded by: Mike Wood
- Succeeded by: Tracy Brabin

Chair of the Labour Women's Network
- In office 2011–2015
- Leader: Ed Miliband
- Succeeded by: Olivia Bailey

Personal details
- Born: Helen Joanne Leadbeater; 22 June 1974 Dewsbury, West Yorkshire, England
- Died: 16 June 2016 (aged 41) Leeds, West Yorkshire, England
- Cause of death: Murder (gunshot wounds, stab wounds)
- Party: Labour
- Spouse: Brendan Cox (m. 2009)
- Children: 2
- Relatives: Kim Leadbeater (sister)
- Education: Pembroke College, Cambridge (BA)
- Website: Official website

Helen Joanne Cox (née Leadbeater; 22 June 1974 – 16 June 2016) was a British politician who served as Member of Parliament (MP) for Batley and Spen from May 2015 until her murder in June 2016. She was a member of the Labour Party.

Born in Batley, West Yorkshire, Cox studied Social and Political Sciences at Pembroke College, Cambridge. Working first as a political assistant, she joined the international humanitarian charity Oxfam in 2001, where she became head of policy and advocacy at Oxfam GB in 2005. She was selected to contest the Batley and Spen parliamentary seat after the incumbent, Mike Wood, decided not to stand in 2015. She held the seat for Labour with an increased majority. Cox became a campaigner on issues relating to the Syrian civil war, and founded and chaired the all-party parliamentary group Friends of Syria.

On 16 June 2016, Cox died after being shot and stabbed multiple times in the street in the village of Birstall, where she had been due to hold a constituency surgery. Thomas Mair, who held far-right views, was found guilty of her murder in November and sentenced to life imprisonment with a whole life order. In July 2021, Cox's sister, Kim Leadbeater, was elected as the Labour MP for Batley and Spen, following a by-election.

== Early life and career beginnings ==
Helen Joanne Leadbeater was born on 22 June 1974 at Staincliffe General Hospital in Dewsbury, West Yorkshire, England, to Jean, a school secretary, and Gordon Leadbeater, a toothpaste and hairspray factory worker.

She grew up in Batley, and was educated at Heckmondwike Grammar School, a state grammar school, where she was head girl, with head boy Richard Woffenden of Liversedge, under headmaster Chris Parker.

She gained the Duke of Edinburgh Bronze in May 1990, and eight GCSEs in August 1990, when in form 5R. On Friday 2 October 1991 she met author and former Conservative MP Jeffrey Archer, being pictured with him, when he visited the school with local Conservative MP Elizabeth Peacock. She attained grade A in A-levels Geography and Biology, and also gained Chemistry A-level.

During summers, she worked packing toothpaste. Cox studied at Pembroke College, Cambridge, initially studying Archaeology and Anthropology before switching to Social and Political Science, graduating in 1995. She later studied at the London School of Economics.

Following her graduation from Pembroke College, Cox worked as an adviser to Labour MP Joan Walley from 1995 to 1997. She then became head of Key Campaigns at Britain in Europe (1998–99), a pro-European pressure group, before moving to Brussels to spend two years as an assistant to Glenys Kinnock, wife of former Labour leader Neil Kinnock, who was then a Member of the European Parliament.

From 2001 to 2009, Cox worked for the aid groups Oxfam and Oxfam International, first in Brussels as the leader of the group's trade reform campaign, then as head of policy and advocacy at Oxfam GB in 2005, and head of Oxfam International's humanitarian campaigns in New York City in 2007. While there, she helped to publish For a Safer Tomorrow, a book authored by Ed Cairns which examines the changing nature of the world's humanitarian policies. Her work for Oxfam, in which she met disadvantaged groups in Darfur and Afghanistan, influenced her political thinking.

Cox's charity work led to a role advising Sarah Brown, wife of former Prime Minister Gordon Brown, who was spearheading a campaign to prevent deaths in pregnancy and childbirth. From 2009 to 2011, Cox was director of the Maternal Mortality Campaign, which was supported by Brown and her husband. The following year, Cox worked for Save the Children (where she was a strategy consultant), the National Society for the Prevention of Cruelty to Children, and as director of strategy at the White Ribbon Alliance for Safe Motherhood. In 2013, she founded UK Women, a research institute aimed at meeting the needs of women in the UK, where she was also the CEO. Between 2014 and 2015, Cox worked for the Bill & Melinda Gates Foundation.

Cox was the national chair of the Labour Women's Network from 2011 to 2015, and a strategic adviser to the Freedom Fund, an anti-slavery charity, in 2014. She was also on the board of Burma Campaign UK, a human rights NGO.

== Political career ==
Cox was nominated by the Labour Party to contest the Batley and Spen seat being vacated by Mike Wood at the 2015 general election. She was selected as its candidate from an all-women shortlist. The Batley and Spen seat was a Conservative marginal between 1983 and 1997 but was considered to be a safe seat for Labour, and Cox won the seat with 43.2% of the vote, increasing Labour's majority to 6,051. Cox made her maiden speech in the House of Commons on 3 June 2015, using it to celebrate her constituency's ethnic diversity, while highlighting the economic challenges facing the community and urging the government to rethink its approach to economic regeneration. She was one of 36 Labour MPs who nominated Jeremy Corbyn as a candidate in the Labour leadership election of 2015, but said she had done so to get him on the list and encourage a broad debate. In the election she voted for Liz Kendall, and announced following the local elections on 6 May 2016 that she and fellow MP Neil Coyle regretted nominating Corbyn.

Cox campaigned for a solution to the Syrian civil war. In October 2015, she co-authored an article in The Observer with Conservative MP Andrew Mitchell, arguing that British military forces could help achieve an ethical solution to the conflict, including the creation of civilian safe havens in Syria. During that month, Cox launched the all-party parliamentary group Friends of Syria, becoming its chair. In the Commons vote in December to approve UK military intervention against ISIL in Syria, Cox abstained because she believed in a more comprehensive strategy that would also include combatting President Bashar al-Assad and his "indiscriminate barrel bombs". She wrote: "By refusing to tackle Assad's brutality, we may actively alienate more of the Sunni population, driving them towards Isis. So I have decided to abstain. Because I am not against airstrikes per se, but I cannot actively support them unless they are part of a plan. Because I believe in action to address Isis, but do not believe it will work in isolation."

Andrew Grice of The Independent felt that she "argued forcefully that the UK Government should be doing more both to help the victims and use its influence abroad to bring an end to the Syrian conflict." In February 2016, Cox wrote to the Nobel Committee praising the work of the Syrian Civil Defense, a civilian voluntary emergency rescue organisation known as the White Helmets, and nominating them for the Nobel Peace Prize, stating: "In the most dangerous place on earth these unarmed volunteers risk their lives to help anyone in need regardless of religion or politics." The nomination was accepted by the committee, and garnered the support of twenty of her fellow MPs and several celebrities, including George Clooney, Daniel Craig, Chris Martin and Michael Palin. The nomination was supported by members of Canada's New Democratic Party, who urged Stéphane Dion, the country's Foreign Affairs Minister, to give his backing on behalf of Canada.

Cox, a supporter of the Labour Friends of Palestine and the Middle East, called for the lifting of the blockade of the Gaza Strip. She opposed efforts by the government to curtail the Boycott, Divestment and Sanctions movement, and said: "I believe that this is a gross attack on democratic freedoms. Not only is it right to boycott unethical companies but it is our right to do so." Cox was working with Conservative MP Tom Tugendhat on a report to be published following the release of the Chilcot Report into the 2003 invasion of Iraq. Following her death, Tugendhat wrote in The Times: "Our starting point was that while Britain must learn the painful lessons of Iraq, we must not let the pendulum swing towards knee-jerk isolationism, ideological pacifism and doctrinal anti-interventionism." With the charity Tell MAMA she worked on The Geography of Anti-Muslim Hatred, investigating cases of Islamophobia; the report was dedicated to her at its launch on 29 June 2016. Two parliamentary questions concerning the Yemeni conflict, tabled by Cox to the Foreign and Commonwealth Office on 14 June, were answered by Under-Secretary of State for Foreign Affairs, Tobias Ellwood after her death. On 1 July, The Guardian reported that each answer was accompanied by a government note stating: "This question was tabled before the sad death of the honourable lady but the subject remains important and the government's response ought to be placed on the public record."

Cox was a Remainer in the campaign leading to the 2016 referendum on the UK's membership of the European Union. Following her death, the EU referendum campaign was suspended for the day by both sides as a mark of respect. The BBC cancelled editions of Question Time and This Week, two political discussion programmes scheduled to air that evening focusing on issues relating to the referendum.

== Personal life ==
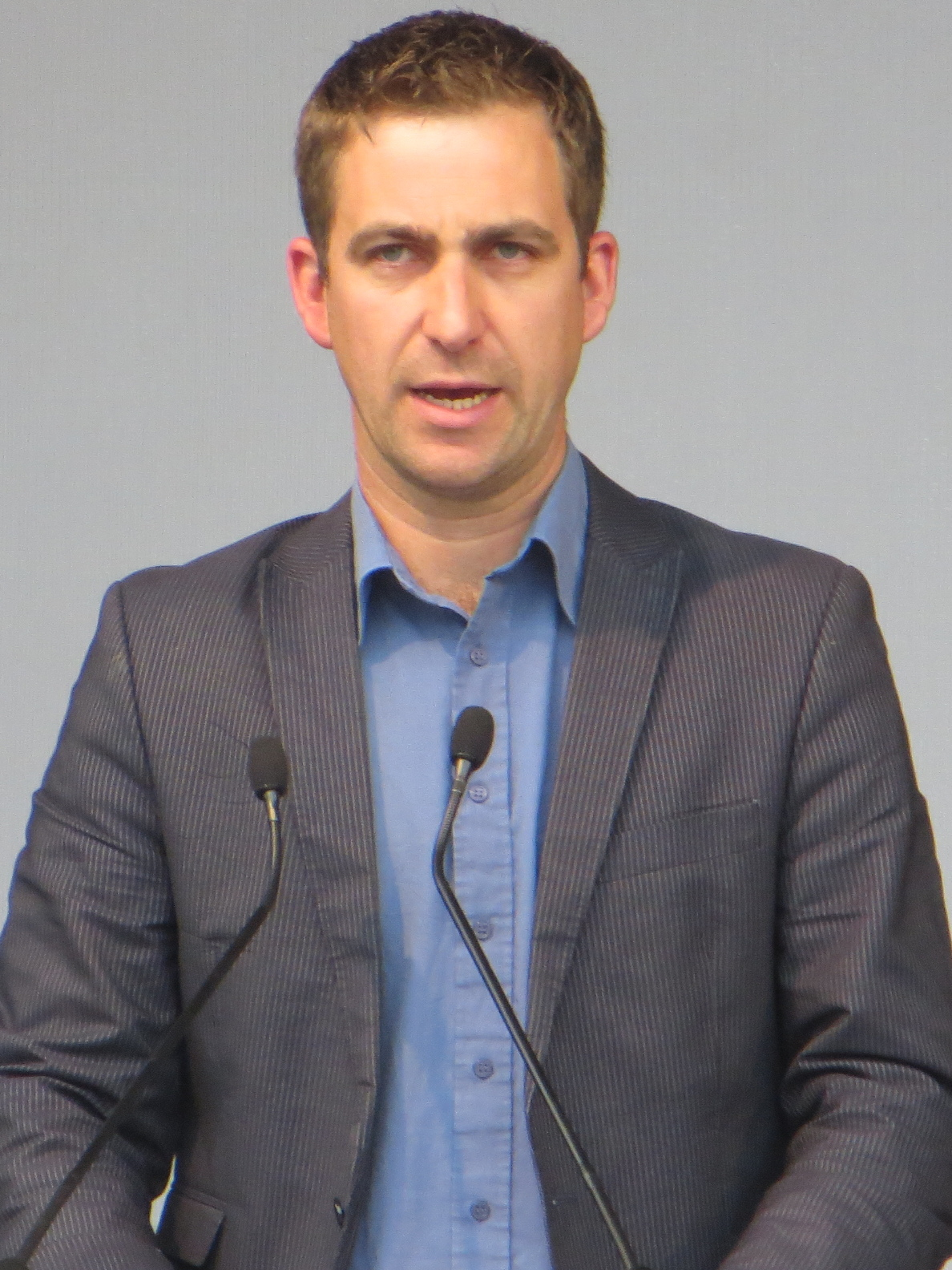
Brendan Cox at the Trafalgar Square tribute to his wife, on 22 June 2016

Cox was married to Brendan Cox from June 2009 until her death in June 2016. He was an adviser on international development to Gordon Brown during Brown's premiership, whom she met while she was working for Oxfam. They had two children. The Cox family divided their time between their constituency home and a houseboat, a converted Dutch barge, on the Thames, moored near Tower Bridge in London. A secular humanist and trade unionist, Cox was a supporter of the British Humanist Association and a member of both GMB and Unison.

== Murder ==
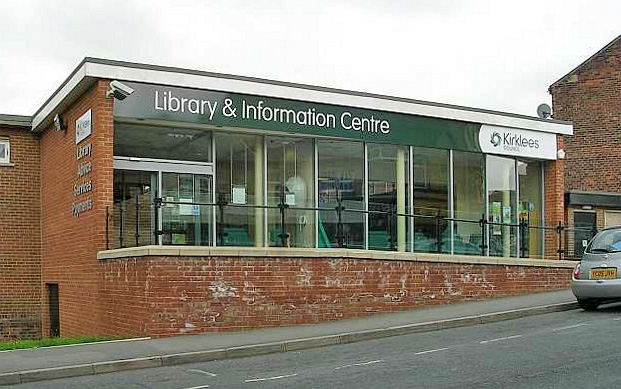
The library in Birstall where Cox had been due to hold a constituency surgery at the time of the attack

At 12:53 pm BST on Thursday, 16 June 2016, Cox was fatally shot and stabbed outside a library in Birstall, West Yorkshire, where she was about to hold a constituency surgery at 1:00 pm. According to eyewitnesses, she was shot three times—once near the head—and stabbed multiple times. A 77-year-old local man, Bernard Kenny, was stabbed in the stomach while trying to fend off her attacker. Initial reports indicated that the attacker, Thomas Mair, a 52-year-old Batley and Spen constituent and a white supremacist who was obsessed with Nazis and apartheid-era South Africa and had links to the US-based neo-Nazi group National Alliance, shouted "Britain first" as he attacked her.

Paul Golding, leader of the far-right Britain First party, issued a statement denying any involvement or encouragement in the attack and suggested that the phrase "could have been a slogan rather than a reference to our party." Later at Mair's trial, a witness stated that he shouted: "This is for Britain. Britain will always come first."

Four hours after the incident, West Yorkshire Police announced that Cox had died of her injuries shortly after being admitted to Leeds General Infirmary. She was the first sitting MP to be killed since Ian Gow (Conservative), who was killed by a Provisional IRA car bomb in July 1990, and the first MP to be seriously assaulted since Stephen Timms, who was stabbed by Roshonara Choudhry in an attempted murder in May 2010. A memorial service was held at St Peter's Church in Birstall the following day.

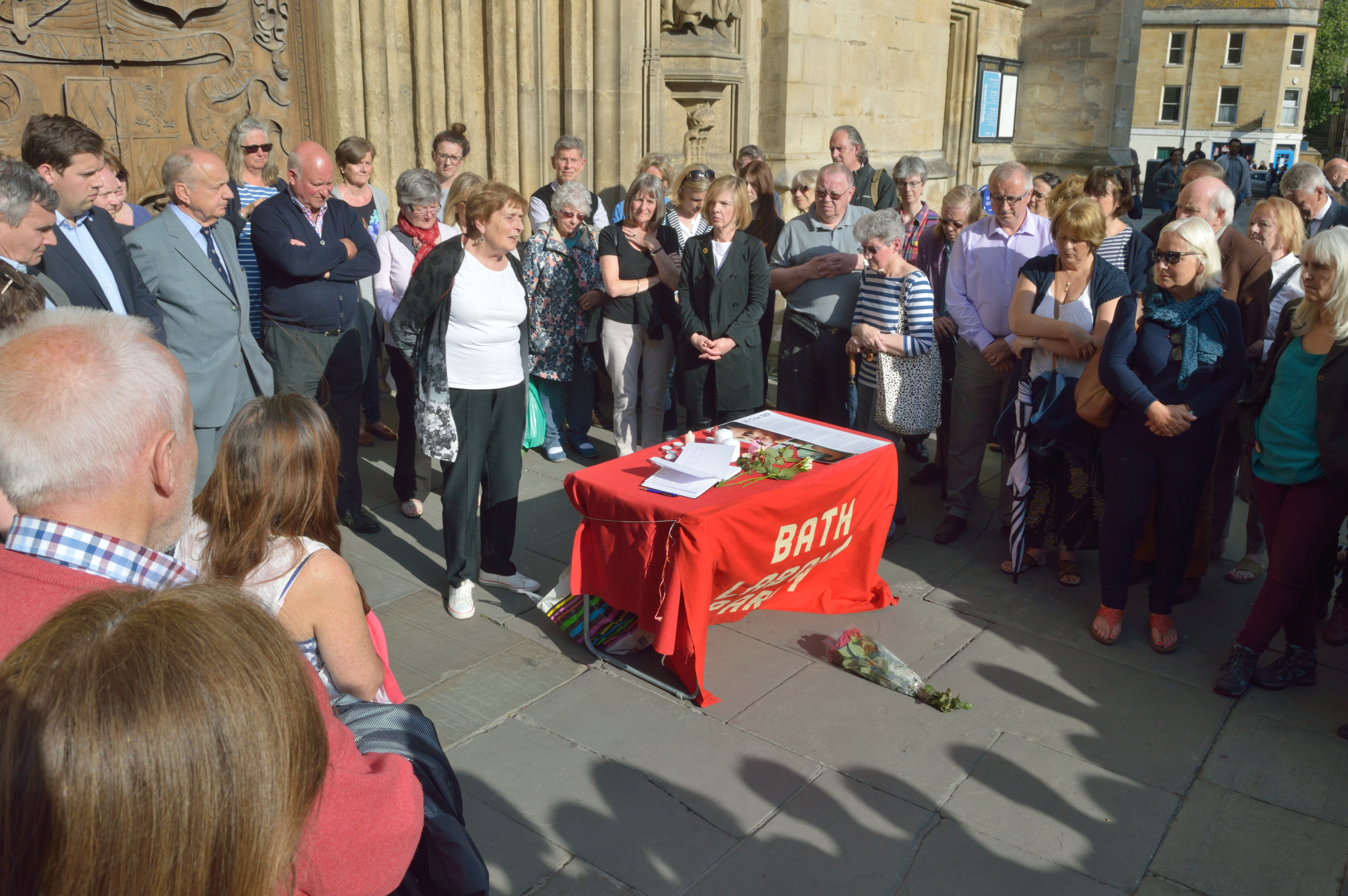
A vigil for Cox held in remembrance outside Bath Abbey, one of the many held around Britain, 18 June 2016

Mair was arrested shortly after the attack. In a statement issued the day after the attack, West Yorkshire Police said that Cox was the victim of a "targeted attack" and the suspect's links to far-right extremism were a "priority line of inquiry" in the search for a motive. Mair was also examined by a psychiatrist who concluded that Mair was responsible for his actions and that poor mental health was not the consequent factor for his attacks. On 18 June, Mair was charged with murder, grievous bodily harm (GBH), possession of a firearm with intent to commit an indictable offence and possession of an offensive weapon. He appeared at Westminster Magistrates' Court later that day, and at the Old Bailey on 20 June.

On 23 November 2016, Mair was found guilty of all charges – the murder of Cox, stabbing Bernard Kenny (a charge of grievous bodily harm with intent), possession of a firearm with intent to commit an indictable offence and possession of an offensive weapon, namely the dagger. The trial judge imposed on Mair (then 53) a life sentence with a whole life tariff – not to be released from prison, except at the discretion of the Home Secretary. As confirmed by the Crown Prosecution Service, Mair's conviction for a crime amounting to a terrorism offence also means he is officially considered a terrorist by the United Kingdom.

=== Aftermath ===
The murder attracted worldwide attention with tributes and memorials for Cox being made with condemnation of Mair. A personal friend, Canadian MP Nathan Cullen, paid tribute to Cox in the House of Commons of Canada. Canadian Prime Minister Justin Trudeau, former US Secretary of State Hillary Clinton, the then-US Secretary of State John Kerry and former US Representative Gabby Giffords, who was wounded in an assassination attempt in 2011, were among international politicians who sent messages of condemnation and sympathy in the aftermath of her killing. Cox's husband issued a statement urging people to "fight against the hatred that killed her".

Among those who paid tribute to Cox were Labour Party leader Jeremy Corbyn, who described her as someone who was "dedicated to getting us to live up to our promises to support the developing world and strengthen human rights", while Prime Minister David Cameron said she was "a star for her constituents, a star in parliament, and right across the house". US President Barack Obama telephoned Cox's husband to offer his condolences, noting that "the world is a better place because of her selfless service to others." Parliament was recalled on 20 June 2016 for fellow MPs to pay tribute to Cox.

The day after Cox died, 17 June 2016, her husband set up a GoFundMe page named "Jo Cox's Fund" in aid of three charities which he described as "closest to her heart": the Royal Voluntary Service, Hope not Hate, and the White Helmets, a Syrian civil defence group. £700,000 had been raised by 19 June 2016, with the amount exceeding £1 million by the following day. On 20 June, Oxfam announced it would release Stand As One – Live at Glastonbury 2016, an album of live performances from the festival in memory of Cox and that proceeds from the album, released on 11 July, would go towards the charity's work with refugees. The festival opened with a tribute to Cox. On the evening of 23 June, while ballots were being counted in the EU membership referendum, polling officials in the Yorkshire and Humber region observed a minute's silence.

On 22 June, which would have been Cox's birthday, a rally in her memory was held in Trafalgar Square. Speakers included Brendan Cox, Gillian Anderson, Bill Nighy, Malala Yousafzai, and Bono.

West Yorkshire coroner Martin Fleming opened an inquest into Cox's death at Bradford Coroner's Court on 24 June. It was adjourned following a six-minute hearing and her body released to allow her family to make funeral arrangements. The funeral, "a very small and private family affair", was held in her constituency on 15 July, with many thousands of people paying their respects as the cortege passed.

A by-election in Batley and Spen was held on 20 October 2016. Labour candidate Tracy Brabin, an actress whose credits include a role in Coronation Street in the mid-1990s, won the by-election with 86 per cent of the vote. The Conservative Party, Liberal Democrats, Green Party, and UKIP did not contest the election as a mark of respect. Far-right candidate and former British National Party member Jack Buckby caused widespread condemnation by standing for Liberty GB in the by-election, with Jack Dromey, Cox's former Labour colleague in Parliament, describing his candidacy as "obscene, outrageous and contemptible".

One year after her murder, three individuals who came to her aid were honoured in the 2017 Queen's Birthday Honours. Bernard Kenny, a passerby who tried to stop Mair during the attack and was himself stabbed in the stomach, was awarded the George Medal, which is given to civilians who exhibit great bravery. PC Craig Nicholls and PC Jonathan Wright of the West Yorkshire Police, who apprehended and arrested her attacker after he had fled the scene, were awarded the Queen's Gallantry Medal.

== Legacy ==
In December 2016, a group of politicians came together to record a cover of the Rolling Stones "You Can't Always Get What You Want" in honour of Cox. Politicians from the Labour Party, the Conservatives, and the Scottish National Party (SNP) joined with members of the Parliament Choir, the Royal Opera House Thurrock Community Chorus, KT Tunstall, Steve Harley, Kaiser Chiefs' Ricky Wilson, David Gray and other musicians. All profits from sales of the song went to the Jo Cox Foundation. The single raised over £35,000 for the Jo Cox Foundation and was in the iTunes top 10 after its release but was placed 136 in the Christmas chart.

The musician Peter Gabriel, who had befriended Cox at a leadership conference, wrote a song, "Love Can Heal", and dedicated it to her memory. He performed it with Sting during their joint "Rock, Paper, Scissors" tour of North America of 2016, and again on his own I/O The Tour of 2023. The song, partially recorded on the 2016 tour and partially in the studio, was released on 31 August 2023 as the 9th single of his I/O album.

In May 2017, a memorial designed by Cox's children was unveiled in the House of Commons. The unveiling took place at the first "Great Get Together" event that the Jo Cox Foundation held and was in the form of a family day at Parliament. In June 2017, Cox's husband Brendan published Jo Cox: More In Common, a book that talks about the impact of his wife's death on their family. Also in June 2017, and to mark the first anniversary of Cox's death, her family and friends urged people to take part in a weekend of events to celebrate her life and held under the banner of "The Great Get Together"; events included picnics, street parties and concerts.

Place Jo Cox/Jo Coxplein in Brussels

A street, formerly Rue Pierre–Étienne Flandin after Pierre-Étienne Flandin, in Avallon, a town in the Yonne département of France, was renamed Rue Jo Cox in May 2017. In Brussels, a square beside the Ancienne Belgique concert hall was renamed Place Jo Cox/Jo Coxplein in September 2018. In Mamer, Luxembourg, a new street was named after her.

A work of contemporary dance theatre inspired by Cox's political and social beliefs, entitled "More in Common", was created by Youth Music Theatre UK in August 2017 and presented at the Square Chapel, Halifax.

Her alma mater, Pembroke College, announced a Jo Cox Studentship in Refugee and Migration Studies, which was first awarded in 2017 after extensive fundraising by members of the college.

Following the approval by the European Parliament of the Brexit withdrawal agreement on 29 January 2020, European Parliament President David Sassoli ended his address by referencing Cox's quote "More in Common".

Out of respect for Cox, other parties with parliamentary representation did not stand against Labour candidate Tracy Brabin at the 2016 Batley and Spen by-election; she was elected with an 85.8% majority. In May 2021, Brabin was elected as Mayor of West Yorkshire and, consequently, resigned as MP. On 2 July 2021, Cox's sister Kim Leadbeater, who declared that she had not previously been a political person but 'cared deeply' about where she had been born and grew up, was elected in the 2021 Batley and Spen by-election.

=== Coat of arms ===
On 24 June 2017, a coat of arms, designed with the input of Cox's children, was unveiled by her family at the House of Commons, where MPs killed in office are honoured with heraldic shields. The elements of the arms included four roses, to symbolise the members of Cox's family (two white roses, for Yorkshire, and two red, for Labour); and the tinctures green, purple, and white, which were the colours of the British suffragette movement. The motto, "More in Common", is displayed below the shield, and comes from her maiden speech made in Parliament, in which she said: "We are far more united and have far more in common than that which divides us." The coat of arms is placed above where Cox usually sat whilst in the chamber.

Coat of arms of Jo Cox
Adopted 6 March 2017 Escutcheon Barry wavy Vert and Purpure a Chevronel Argent between in chief a White Rose and a Red Rose proper both barbed seeded and slipped the stalks conjoined Or and in base a Red Rose and a White Rose proper both barbed seeded and slipped the stalks conjoined Or. Motto MORE IN COMMON Symbolism: Four roses to represent Cox, her husband and children, tinctured white for Yorkshire and red for the Labour Party; Purple, green and white to represent the British suffragette movement; Barry wavy to represent Cox's love of rivers and mountains

== See also ==
- List of British MPs killed in office

Parliament of the United Kingdom
Preceded by Mike Wood	Member of Parliament for Batley and Spen; 2015–2016	Succeeded by Tracy Brabin
