= Hall Park =

Hall Park may refer to:

- Hall Park, Oklahoma, a neighbourhood in Norman, Oklahoma, United States
- Hall Park Academy, a secondary school in Eastwood, Nottinghamshire, England
- Hall Park Ground, a cricket ground in Horsforth, West Yorkshire, England
