= Benjamin Lister =

Benjamin Lister may refer to:

- Benjamin Lister (English cricketer) (1850–1919), English cricketer
- Ben Lister (born 1996), New Zealand cricketer
