= Harold Turner =

Harold Turner may refer to:

- Hal Turner (born 1962), United States politician
- Harold L. Turner (1898–1938), Medal of Honor recipient
- Harold Turner (dancer) (1909–1962), British ballet dancer
- Harold Turner (footballer) (1911–1984), Australian rules footballer

== See also ==
- Harald Turner (1891–1947), World War II German official in the German-imposed Military Administration of Serbia
- Harry Turner (disambiguation)
