= 2021 Batley and Spen by-election =

UK parliament by-election

- 1 July 2021

Batley and Spen constituency
- Turnout: 47.5% (▼19.1 pp)
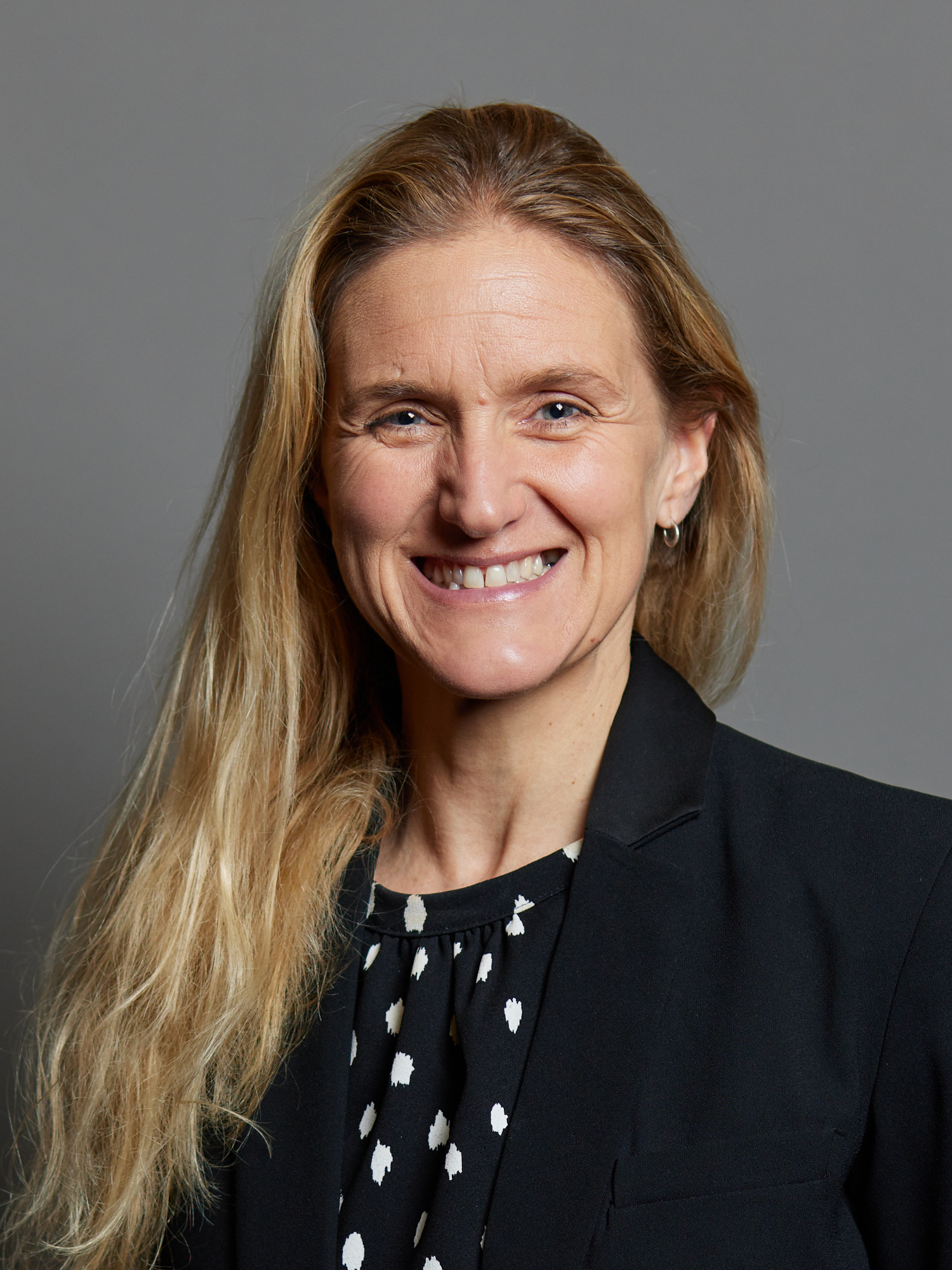

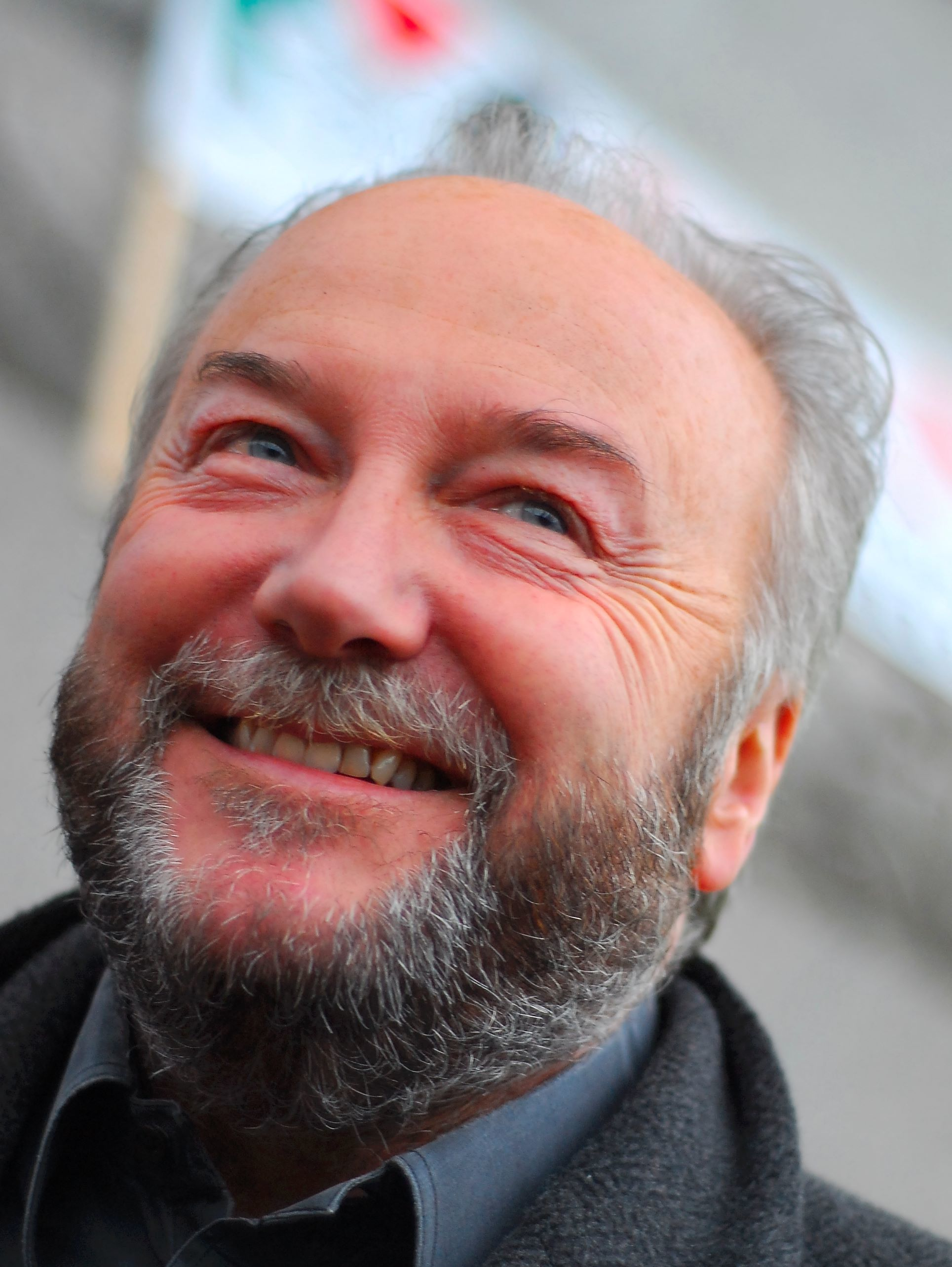
	First party	Second party	Third party
		Con
Candidate	Kim Leadbeater	Ryan Stephenson	George Galloway
Party	Labour	Conservative	Workers Party
Popular vote	13,296	12,973	8,264
Percentage	35.3%	34.4%	21.9%
Swing	▼7.4 pp	▼1.6 pp	New
MP before election
Tracy Brabin
Labour Co-op
Elected MP
Kim Leadbeater
Labour

A by-election for the United Kingdom parliamentary constituency of Batley and Spen was held on 1 July 2021, following the resignation of incumbent Labour Party Member of Parliament (MP) Tracy Brabin after being elected Mayor of West Yorkshire. Kim Leadbeater—the sister of former Batley and Spen MP Jo Cox who was assassinated in 2016—narrowly held the seat for the Labour Party with a reduced majority of 323 votes.

== Background ==
=== Constituency ===
Batley and Spen is a predominantly working-class constituency in the Pennines at the centre of West Yorkshire. Considered to be part of the "red wall", Batley and Spen has been held by Labour since the 1997 general election. The seat's largest town, Batley, has a sizeable number of residents with South Asian backgrounds: Pakistani (9.2%) and Indian (15.9%) (mostly Gujarati), according to the 2001 census. Heckmondwike also has a well-established South Asian community, with 16.9% residents having Pakistani heritage. Other towns in the Spen Valley part of the constituency include Birstall, Birkenshaw, Cleckheaton, Liversedge and Gomersal. These are generally more suburban and Conservative areas, with the exception of Cleckheaton, which has Liberal Democrat councillors.

In the 2016 EU referendum, Batley and Spen voted 60% in favour of Brexit.

=== Representation ===
Batley and Spen has been represented by a Labour MP since 1997. Elizabeth Peacock has been the constituency's only Conservative MP, serving from 1983 to 1997. Brabin had held the seat since the 2016 Batley and Spen by-election, which was called after the murder of Jo Cox, the seat's incumbent MP.

At the 2019 general election, the Labour majority in the constituency decreased significantly, with a 12.8% drop in vote share by comparison with the 2017 result.

On 6 May 2021, Brabin won the inaugural election for the Mayor of West Yorkshire. Under the devolution agreement, the position holds the powers and responsibilities of a police and crime commissioner, meaning the occupant of the office cannot simultaneously sit as an MP. She was appointed Steward and Bailiff of the Chiltern Hundreds on 10 May, vacating her Commons seat.

Brabin expressed concern the constituency could switch to the Tories in the by-election, given Labour's heavy defeat in the 2021 Hartlepool by-election, where Labour unsuccessfully defended a similar majority. However, Stephen Bush from the New Statesman argued that Labour were in a stronger position in Batley and Spen than in Hartlepool.

== Timetable ==
On 27 May, the writ of election was made, and the election was scheduled for 1 July.

The deadline for nominations was 7 June. The deadline for postal vote applications, and changes to existing postal and proxy votes, was 15 June. The deadline for new proxy vote applications was 16 June.

== Candidacy declarations ==
When the result of the West Yorkshire mayoral election was announced on 9 May 2021, Bob Buxton, Yorkshire Party leader and unsuccessful mayoral candidate, announced that his party would contest the by-election.

On 10 May, George Galloway tweeted that the party he leads, the Workers Party of Britain, would contest the election. On 27 May, he announced that he would be the Workers Party candidate.

On 12 May, The Guardian reported that Jo Cox's sister, Kim Leadbeater, and former Labour MP Paula Sherriff were among Labour's potential candidates. On 23 May the Labour Party announced that Leadbeater, a personal trainer and Jo Cox Foundation campaigner, would stand as their candidate. Leadbeater had only recently rejoined the Labour Party, with the Batley and Spen CLP waiving the requirement of a year's membership prior to her selection.

On 19 May, the Conservative Party announced that it had selected Harewood councillor Ryan Stephenson as its candidate for the by-election. In June 2021, Reform UK announced that they would not stand a candidate in the by-election in a bid to boost the Conservative Party's chances of taking the Labour-held seat. Paul Halloran, a locally well-known Brexit supporter who won over 6,000 votes for the Heavy Woollen District Independents at the previous election, also chose not to stand again, a decision which was expected to favour the Conservative candidate.

On 26 May, the Yorkshire Party announced that its members had voted for Corey Robinson, a senior medical research engineer who spent his childhood in the constituency, to be their candidate.

On 28 May, the Liberal Democrats announced they would stand community campaigner Jo Conchie as their candidate. On 3 June, Conchie withdrew for health reasons, and was replaced by Tom Gordon, a councillor in Knottingley. Gordon stood as the Liberal Democrat candidate for Normanton, Pontefract and Castleford at the 2019 general election and would go on to become the Member of Parliament for Harrogate and Knaresborough in the 2024 United Kingdom general election.

The Greens selected rugby player Ross Peltier on 2 June. He was withdrawn as a candidate following the discovery of offensive tweets sent when he was 19 years old. The Greens then confirmed they would not stand in the by-election.

Jayda Fransen, former deputy leader of the far-right group Britain First, announced her intention to stand. "Britain first" were the words used by the murderer of Cox, although the organisation denied any connection to themselves. Fransen had previously stood as a candidate for the seat of Rochester and Strood in Kent, the London Assembly in 2016, and the Scottish Parliament in 2021.

The Christian Peoples Alliance (CPA) confirmed the nomination of Paul Bickerdike on 3 June. The Social Democratic Party confirmed the nomination of Ollie Purser to stand on 3 June.

Nominations closed on 7 June with 16 candidates.

== Campaign ==
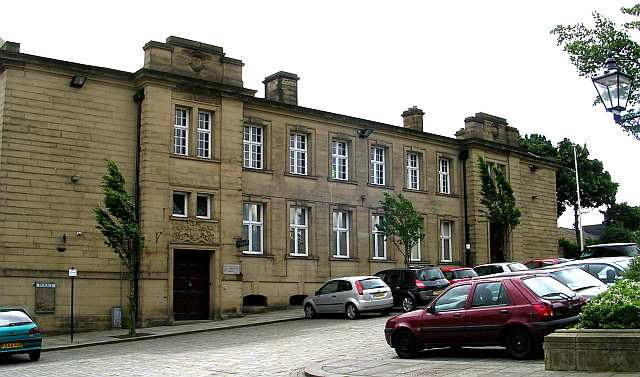
Batley Police Station, the closure of which in July 2018 was a campaign issue

Labour leader Keir Starmer visited the constituency during the campaign on 10 June, and Prime Minister Boris Johnson visited the Fox's Biscuits factory in the constituency on 18 June. Both had made earlier visits as well. On 28 June, Johnson visited the constituency again in a Birstall factory visit.

Labour candidate Kim Leadbeater focused on local issues such as crime, green spaces and the poor condition of the roads. She said "I am the only person out of the 16 candidates that lives in Batley and Spen" and "I have a proven track record of getting things done at a local level and an established reputation for working for all parts of the community." She emphasised that the by-election was not a referendum on Labour party leader Keir Starmer. Her large leaflet used in parts of the constituency did not use the word "Labour" except in the legal imprint, highlighting her name instead.

Conservative candidate Ryan Stephenson emphasised his local practical political experience – as a Leeds councillor and director of a West Yorkshire multi-academy trust – to work with the Conservative government effectively, and would be "banging the drum for investment" in the constituency. He mostly targeted the voters in the Spen Valley rural towns, away from Batley, who until 1997 held a majority in the constituency for the Conservatives.

More than 20 per cent of the electorate are of south Asian origin, and were a major focus of electioneering by Workers Party candidate George Galloway, who concentrated on the issues of the Palestinian territories, the Kashmir conflict, criticism of Labour leader Keir Starmer, the suspension of a teacher for showing a cartoon of Muhammad at Batley Grammar School and the reopening of a police station in Batley. Historically this community were strong supporters of the Labour Party, but there has been discontent at the waiving of Labour party rules to allow Leadbeater to be the only local candidate in the selection process, excluding local councillors from the community.

On 23 June, four of the candidates participated in an online hustings organised by YorkshireLive: George Galloway, Kim Leadbeater, Corey Robinson (Yorkshire Party candidate), and Ryan Stephenson. On the same day the Bishop of Leeds, Nick Baines, issued a statement distancing the United Benefice of Batley from the candidacy of Jayda Fransen, after campaign literature was distributed showing Fransen holding a white cross outside of St Thomas’s church.

On 26 June, Kim Leadbeater was heckled and chased by a group of men while campaigning, after being questioned about her support for LGBT rights and her party's position on Kashmir. The man who challenged her claimed to be speaking on behalf of Muslim parents in the region and had led protests against LGBT-inclusive teaching at schools in Birmingham. During an interview following the incident, Leadbeater accused Galloway of laughing at the situation from across the street. Galloway called the accusation "a lie" and condemned the abuse Leadbeater faced. On 27 June, former MP Tracy Brabin and a group of Labour campaigners were attacked by three men.

On 28 June, the Labour Party was criticised for distributing a leaflet featuring a photo of Boris Johnson with Indian prime minister Narendra Modi. Critics complained the leaflets were designed to appeal to Muslim voters and to exploit divisions between voters originating from India and Pakistan over the Kashmir conflict. Labour Friends of India asked the party to withdraw the leaflet immediately. A Labour spokesman said the leaflet emphasised not voting for the Labour candidate "would lead to a Tory MP who would support a Prime Minister who insults Muslim women and calls it a joke, refuses to deal with Islamophobia in his party and fails to speak out on human rights abuses in Kashmir". In response, Labour MP Navendu Mishra accused his own party of having a "hierarchy of racism", with "some groups seen as fair game for attacks based on religion/race/heritage".

== Opinion polling ==
Pollster	Client	Date(s) conducted	Sample size	Lab	Con	Lib Dem	WPB	Others	Lead
2021 by-election		1 Jul 2021	–	35.3%	34.4%	3.3%	21.9%	3.1%	0.9%
Survation	The Daily Mail	9–17 Jun 2021	510	41%	47%	3%	6%	2%	6%
2019 general election		12 Dec 2019	–	42.7%	36.0%	4.7%	–	16.7%	6.7%

== Result ==
Bar chart of the election result.

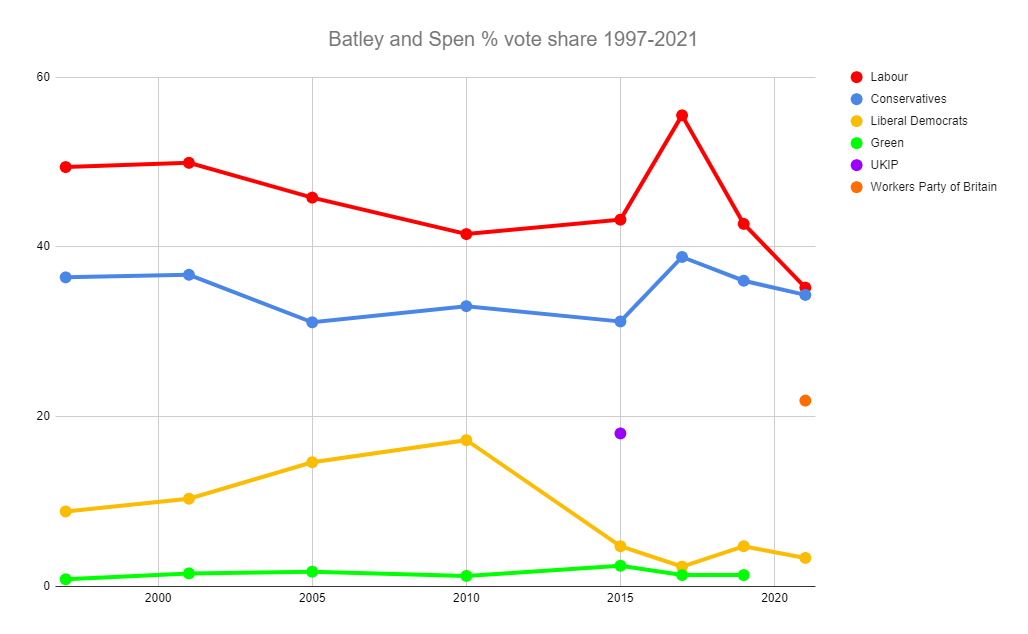
Batley and Spen vote share as a percentage 1997–2021 (note: the 2016 by-election is not shown as Labour were the only major party to stand)

By-election 2021: Batley and Spen
Party	Candidate	Votes	%	±%
Labour	Kim Leadbeater	13,296	35.3	–7.4
Conservative	Ryan Stephenson	12,973	34.4	–1.6
Workers Party	George Galloway	8,264	21.9	New
Liberal Democrats	Tom Gordon	1,254	3.3	–1.3
Yorkshire	Corey Robinson	816	2.1	New
English Democrat	Thérèse Hirst	207	0.6	New
UKIP	Jack Thomson	151	0.4	New
Monster Raving Loony	Howling Laud Hope	107	0.3	New
Alliance for Green Socialism	Mike Davies	104	0.3	New
CPA	Paul Bickerdike	102	0.3	New
Freedom Alliance	Jonathon Tilt	100	0.3	New
For Britain	Anne Marie Waters	97	0.3	New
Rejoin EU	Andrew Smith	75	0.2	New
SDP	Ollie Purser	66	0.2	New
Independent	Jayda Fransen	50	0.1	New
Heritage	Susan Laird	33	0.1	New
Majority		323	0.9	–5.8
Turnout		37,695	47.5	–19.1
Labour hold		Swing	–2.90	

== Previous result ==
General election 2019: Batley and Spen
Party	Candidate	Votes	%	±%
Labour Co-op	Tracy Brabin	22,594	42.7	–12.8
Conservative	Mark Brooks	19,069	36.0	–2.8
Heavy Woollen District Independents	Paul Halloran	6,432	12.2	New
Liberal Democrats	John Lawson	2,462	4.7	+2.4
Brexit Party	Clive Minihan	1,678	3.2	New
Green	Ty Akram	692	1.3	±0.0
Majority		3,525	6.7	–10.0
Turnout		52,927	66.5	–0.6
Labour Co-op hold		Swing	–5.0	

== Aftermath ==
The Conservative Party's surprise loss was blamed on their poor campaigning and a scandal that forced the resignation of Health Secretary Matt Hancock the weekend prior to the by-election. Analysis in the i newspaper suggested that George Galloway's socially conservative stance may have attracted some Tory-leaning voters, and that the Green Party's decision not to field a candidate may have proved beneficial to the Labour Party. Galloway stated he was aiming to win over Labour voters in order to oust Keir Starmer as Labour leader.

Writing in The Guardian, Starmer responded to the result by saying "Labour's back, and the promise of a better future is back too." His Shadow Chancellor, Rachel Reeves, claimed that Starmer's leadership was the key factor to Leadbeater's victory, telling Sky News, "Keir will take us into the next election and I believe that result, in the early hours of Friday morning, is the start of more victories for Labour."

Ronan Burtenshaw, editor of Tribune magazine, denied there was any cause for major celebration and insisted that "the result is clearly a shot in the arm for the party's beleaguered leadership." He went on to say, "Keir Starmer won his position as leader on a promise to be electable. But the fact remains that winning a general election today requires 40% or more of the vote. This cannot be achieved by chasing a fixed centre ground of the broadly satisfied, something which no longer exists. It requires the building of a coalition on increasingly shifting sands – and that means, at a bare minimum, an enthusiastic base and a compelling vision for broader society. Despite Kim Leadbeater's commendable victory, Batley and Spen shows that this remains a long way off."

In the New Statesman, Paul Mason pointed out that Labour's pro-LGBT and pro-Israel positions might have resulted in a loss of Muslim votes from the Labour Party towards the Workers Party.

The New Arab's Taj Ali said the result made it clear that Labour was losing Muslim voters because of issues like Kashmir and Palestine, as well as a reluctance to investigate Islamophobia in the party. He was also highly critical of a dog whistle claim, by an anonymous Labour source, that Muslims were angry about "what Keir has been doing on antisemitism". "Given these recent actions," Ali continued, "it is no surprise that many Muslims feel alienated by the Labour Party. Many expect a stronger stance from the Labour leadership on these issues – and rightly so."

Some Jewish groups welcomed Galloway's defeat in the polls. The Jewish Labour Movement called the result a "triumph for hope and decency" over Galloway's "toxic politics". The Jewish Chronicle accused Galloway of running "one of the most tawdry by-election campaigns in memory", and said having him as the MP was "the last thing Batley and Spen needed".

Galloway himself vowed to challenge the result on the basis of an alleged "false statement" made about him by Leadbeater and Starmer, which he claimed tipped the result of the by-election.

== See also ==
- 2016 Batley and Spen by-election, another by-election for the constituency which resulted in Brabin's election to Parliament
- 2012 Bradford West by-election, another by-election Galloway participated in and won with similar circumstances to the one in Batley and Spen
