= Graham Roope =

English cricketer

Personal information
- Full name: Graham Richard James Roope
- Born: 12 July 1946; Fareham, Hampshire, England
- Died: 26 November 2006 (aged 60); St. George's, Grenada
- Batting: Right-handed
- Bowling: Right-arm medium

Career statistics
Competition	Test	ODI	FC	LA
Matches	21	8	403	308
Runs scored	860	173	19,116	6,761
Batting average	30.71	21.62	36.90	28.28
100s/50s	0/7	0/0	26/107	2/31
Top score	77	44	171	120*
Balls bowled	172	–	17,497	5,159
Wickets	0	–	225	131
Bowling average	–	–	37.35	29.79
5 wickets in innings	–	–	4	1
10 wickets in match	–	–	0	0
Best bowling	–	–	5/14	5/23
Catches/stumpings	35/–	2/–	602/2	143/2
- Source: ESPNcricinfo, 1 January 2006

Graham Richard James Roope (12 July 1946 – 26 November 2006) was an English cricketer, who appeared in twenty-one Tests and eight ODIs for England between 1973 and 1978.

He also played for Surrey, Berkshire and Griqualand West in a career spanning 1964 to 1988. He later played for Farsley Cricket Club and coached at Ampleforth College and Woodhouse Grove School, and was head groundsman at the latter when he died, aged 60, in 2006.

The cricket correspondent, Colin Bateman, remarked, "Graham Roope was one of those cricketers who thrilled spectators and frustrated selectors. Tall and stylish, there was a touch of class about his middle-order batting. He could make the ball swing at medium pace and his slip fielding was what you would expect from a Corinthian Casuals goalkeeper". Bateman added "as a former selector said: 'He looked the part – but never played it'".

== Life and career ==
Roope was born in Fareham, Hampshire. After spending five years developing his cricketing talent at St John's School in Porthcawl, he was educated at Bradfield College in Berkshire, and played for Public Schools against Combined Services at Lord's in 1963 and 1964. He played Minor Counties cricket for Berkshire in 1963, before making his county cricket debut for Surrey in 1964. He received his Surrey cap in 1969. He was tall and wiry, with distinctive curly hair. He was an all-rounder: an outstanding slip fielder, often said to be one of the best of his generation, he was also an attacking middle-order batsman and a medium-pace bowler. He took fifty first-class wickets in 1968, and 5–14 against the touring West Indians in 1969, but bowled less later in his career. He was a member of the Surrey sides that won the County Championship in 1971; making a major contribution with 1,641 runs and an exceptional 59 catches in all first-class matches; and the Benson & Hedges Cup in 1974. He retired from full-time first-class cricket after the 1982 season, and played his last first-class match in 1986. In a career of 403 first-class matches, he scored 19,116 runs at 36.90, and took 225 wickets at 37.35, as well as holding 599 catches and making two stumpings as a substitute wicket-keeper. He scored over 1,000 runs in a season on eight occasions.

Roope was remembered by former teammate Geoff Arnold as "having an astounding ability to predict the weather – he would regularly forecast rain when there was not a cloud in the sky".

It is often said that Roope was at the non-striking end when both John Edrich, and later Geoff Boycott, reached their 100th centuries in first-class cricket in 1977. Although the second is certainly correct, achieved at 5.49pm on the first day of the fourth Ashes Test at Headingley on 11 August, when Roope had to take evasive action to avoid a straight-hit four off the bowling of Greg Chappell to bring up Boycott's century, a close inspection of the record books indicates that Roope had swapped batting positions with Geoff Howarth, for the match against Derbyshire at The Oval on 12 July, and Howarth was at the crease when Edrich scored the necessary runs off the bowling of Alan Hill, shortly after play should have ended at 5:30pm on the third and final day. However, another version of events suggests that both Roope and Howarth were in the middle when this happened, with Roope acting as a runner for Howarth.

He toured India and Pakistan with England in 1972–73, making his Test debut in the fourth Test against India at Kanpur. He played at home against New Zealand and West Indies in 1973, making two Test half-centuries, but was not then selected until the fourth and final Ashes Test against Australia at The Oval in 1975. After a first-innings duck, he made his best Test score of 77 in the second innings, enabling England to save the match against Dennis Lillee, Jeff Thomson and Max Walker, despite a first innings deficit of 431 runs. He then fell out of favour again, before returning for the fourth and fifth Ashes Tests in 1977. He scored three further half-centuries on tour to Pakistan and New Zealand in 1977–78, and one more playing at home against Pakistan in 1978. His last Test appearance was in the first Test against New Zealand at home later in 1978. In all, he played 21 Tests and eight One Day Internationals for England, and was on the losing side in only two Tests and one ODI.

Roope also played Non-League football as goalkeeper for a number of clubs including Corinthian Casuals, Ashford Town, Wimbledon, Hayes, Guildford City, Ramsgate, Margate, Kingstonian and Woking. He also played as an amateur in the Mid Sussex League for Ardingly and Cuckfield and in the Mid Sussex League Representative side in 1984 and 1985.

He played again for Berkshire from 1983 to 1988, after retiring from Surrey. He moved to Yorkshire, where he became a coach at Ampleforth College and Woodhouse Grove School, and played for Hall Park in the Airedale and Wharfedale League. He was also a cricket commentator for BBC Radio Leeds.

Graham Roope died suddenly of a heart attack in St George's, Grenada, while on a charity cricket tour.

He was married three times, with a son and two daughters.

== Notes ==
Preceded by Neal Radford	Nelson Cricket Club; Professional; 1983	Succeeded by Barry Wood
