= Emanuel Scott =

English cricketer

Emanuel Scott (6 July 1834 – 3 December 1898) was an English first-class cricketer, who played one match for Yorkshire County Cricket Club in 1864.

Born in Birkenshaw, Yorkshire, England, Scott batted right-handed and scored eight runs in his only innings, against Kent at Swatter's Carr, Middlesbrough. He also took two wickets for 27, bowling right arm, round arm, medium pace. Yorkshire won the match by four wickets. Scott also played for the Gentlemen of Sussex from 1860 to 1869.

Scott died in December 1898, in Birkenshaw, Yorkshire.
