= Kim Leadbeater =

British politician (born 1976)

Kim Leadbeater MBE MP
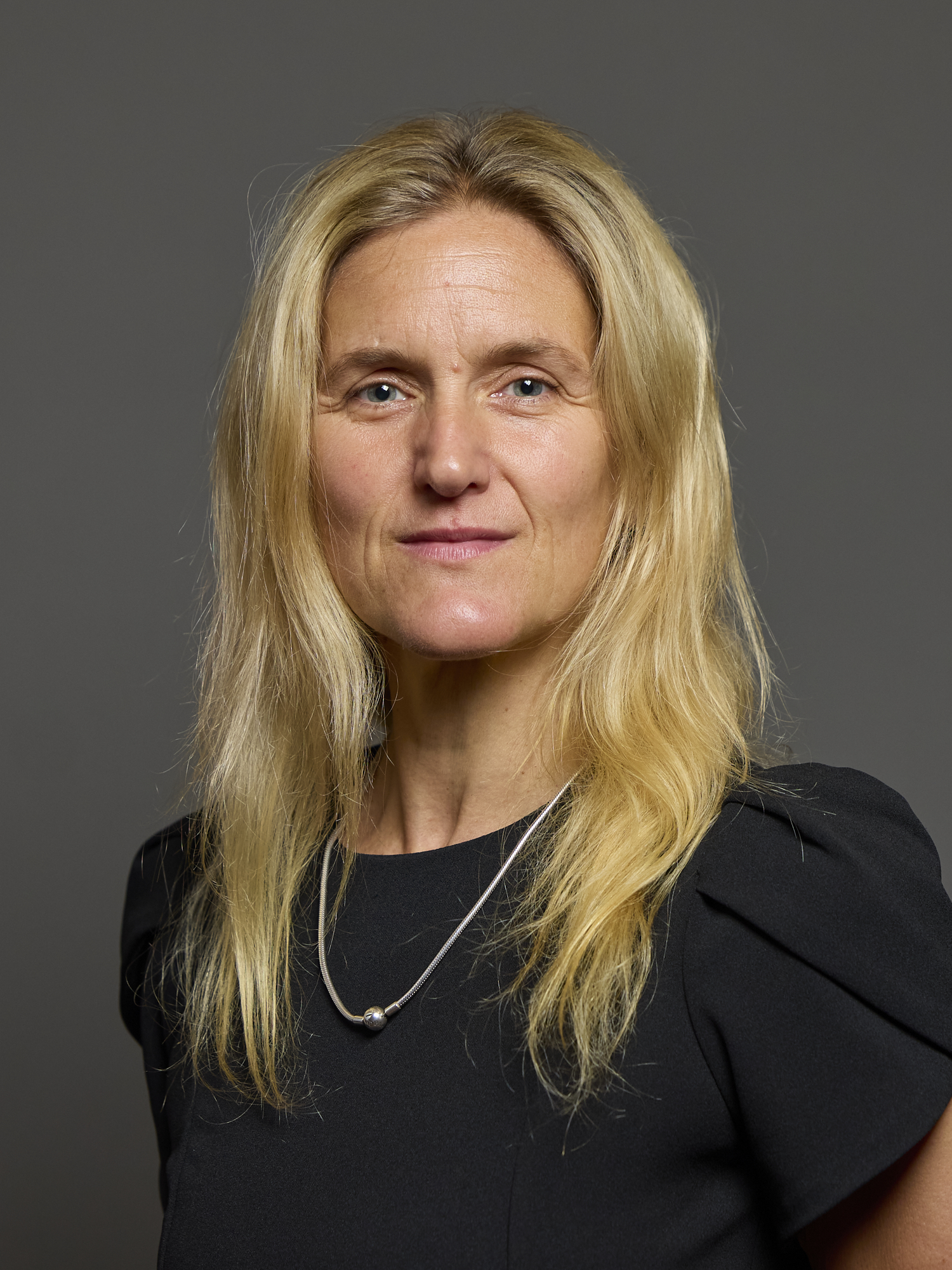
- Official portrait, 2024

Member of Parliament for Spen Valley Batley and Spen (2021–2024)
- Incumbent
- Assumed office 1 July 2021
- Preceded by: Tracy Brabin
- Majority: 6,188 (15.1%)

Personal details
- Born: Kim Michele Leadbeater; 1 May 1976 (age 50) Dewsbury, West Yorkshire, England
- Party: Labour
- Domestic partner: Claire
- Relatives: Jo Cox (sister)
- Education: Leeds Beckett University (BSc)
- Website: spenvalleykim.co.uk

Kim Michele Leadbeater (/ˈlɛdbiːtə(r)/; born 1 May 1976) is a British Labour Party politician who has been the Member of Parliament (MP) for Spen Valley, formerly Batley and Spen, since 2021.

== Early life and career ==
Kim Leadbeater was born on 1 May 1976 in Dewsbury, to parents Jean and Gordon Leadbeater. She is the younger sister of the late Jo Cox MP (1974–2016). Leadbeater attended Heckmondwike Grammar School, and says that she has lived in "every little bit of" the local area. She played in the school netball team.

She went on to graduate with a Bachelor of Science (BSc) degree in health-related exercise and fitness from Leeds Beckett University in 2005 and a Postgraduate Certificate in Education (PGCE) from the University of Huddersfield in 2008.

Before moving into politics, Leadbeater was a lecturer in physical health at Bradford College, and has worked as a personal trainer.

== Parliamentary career ==
On 23 May 2021, Leadbeater was selected as the Labour Party candidate for the Batley and Spen by-election. Upon her selection, Leadbeater declared that she was "the candidate the Tories fear". Her selection proved controversial, as Leadbeater had been selected despite only joining the party in recent weeks; the rule requiring that candidates should be a member of the party for a year before being nominated was waived. She had previously been a member of the Labour Party but let this lapse following the murder of her sister when she helped found the Jo Cox Foundation on a non-party basis.

At the by-election, Leadbeater was elected to Parliament as MP for Batley and Spen with 35.3% of the vote and a majority of 323. Leadbeater made her maiden speech on 9 September 2021 during a debate on her sister's legacy.

In her first six months in parliament, her two longest speeches were tributes to her sister and to David Amess, another MP who was murdered in October 2021. She argued that the safety of MPs was not being taken seriously enough, and she called for anonymity on social media to become an exception to combat a culture of abuse.

In November 2022, she criticised the 2023 Periodic Review of Westminster constituencies which proposed the breakup of her Batley and Spen constituency. She announced in May 2023 that she intended to stand for the new constituency of Spen Valley at the 2024 general election, following changes made by the Boundary Commission which would abolish the Batley and Spen and create Spen Valley and Dewsbury and Batley.

In June 2023, she authored a report, published by the Fabian Society: Healthy Britain: a new approach to health and wellbeing policy.

As of June 2023, she was chair of the all-party parliamentary groups (APPGs) on Sport and Tidy Britain, co-chair of the groups on Political Literacy and on Tackling Loneliness and Connected Communities, and vice-chair or officer of several others.

At the 2024 general election, Leadbeater was elected to Parliament as MP for Spen Valley with 39.2% of the vote and a majority of 6,188. She is a backbencher MP.

In an interview on episode 109 of the podcast Leading, she told Rory Stewart and Alastair Campbell that she finds being an MP "frustrating" and that she "doesn't particularly enjoy being an MP", before noting that it was a privileged and important role in public life.

In September 2024, Leadbeater was drawn first in the ballot for private members' bills. She announced on 3 October 2024 that she would introduce a bill on assisted dying. She introduced the Terminally Ill Adults (End of Life) Bill in October. During November 2024, the prime minister, Keir Starmer, said the vote on Leadbeater's bill was "very important". Additionally, Starmer said they must invest in NHS care for all needs, "including end-of-life care."

In response to MPs putting forward an amendment aimed at preventing the Bill being debated, Leadbeater noted how society's attitudes towards dying changed over the past decade. Leadbeater cited Rob Marris's Assisted Dying Bill of 2015, which was overwhelmingly rejected by MPs. In the last few days of debate, Leadbeater urged attention to be drawn towards the "families [of those] who are dying horrendous deaths", rather than debates about 'process'.

In April 2026, due to over 1,000, Lords' amendments to Leadbeater's Bill, it ran out of parliamentary time when the parliamentary session was prorogued, without a carry-over motion, resulting in the termination of the Assisted dying bill's progress.

In June 2026, Labour MP Lauren Edwards, said that she would be re-introducing a PMB to the Commons, identical to the one which had previously been talked out in the Lords, and had failed to pass into law within the allotted time-span.

== Personal life ==
Leadbeater lives in her constituency with her partner Claire. Outside politics, her main interests are hockey and other sports.

In 2020, she was appointed President of West Yorkshire Scouts.

Her older sister, Jo Cox, had served as the MP for Batley and Spen from May 2015 until her murder in June 2016; Leadbeater contributed to the 2017 book Jo Cox: More in Common.

== Awards ==
In 2018, Leadbeater was awarded the UK's one thousandth Points of Light award by Prime Minister Theresa May for having "rejected the hate that marked [her] sister's murder to continue Jo's work and ensure that Jo's determination to change the world has lived on."

In the 2021 New Year Honours, Leadbeater was appointed Member of the Order of the British Empire (MBE) "For services to Social Cohesion, to the community in Batley, West Yorkshire and to Combatting Loneliness during Covid-19", when she was described in The London Gazette as "Ambassador, Jo Cox Foundation and Chair, More in Common Batley and Spen".

The Spectator named her as 2021's "Newcomer of the Year".

Parliament of the United Kingdom
Preceded by Tracy Brabin	Member of Parliament for Spen Valley; 2021–present	Incumbent
