= BBG Academy =

Coordinates: 53°44′43.3″N 1°41′25.4″W

BBG Academy 1

Location
- Bradford Road; Birkenshaw; West Yorkshire, BD19 4BE; England

Information
- Type: Academy
- Local authority: Kirklees
- Trust: Rodillian Multi-Academy Trust
- Department for Education URN: 138111 Tables
- Ofsted: Reports
- Gender: Mixed
- Age: 11 to 16
- Enrolment: 692 as of March 2016
- Website: http://www.bbgacademy.com/

BBG Academy (formerly Birkenshaw Middle School) is a mixed secondary school located in Birkenshaw, West Yorkshire, England.

Birkenshaw Middle School was a community school administered by Kirklees Metropolitan Borough Council. The school educated pupils aged 9 to 13. A long campaign was established by parents to retain the school when the council announced plans to close it, which resulted in the school converting to academy status in 2012. The school (now named BBG Academy) then changed the age range of pupils to become an 11 to 16 secondary school. In March 2016 the school was inspected by Ofsted and achieved a "Good" in all areas.
