= Mike Wood (Labour politician) =

British politician

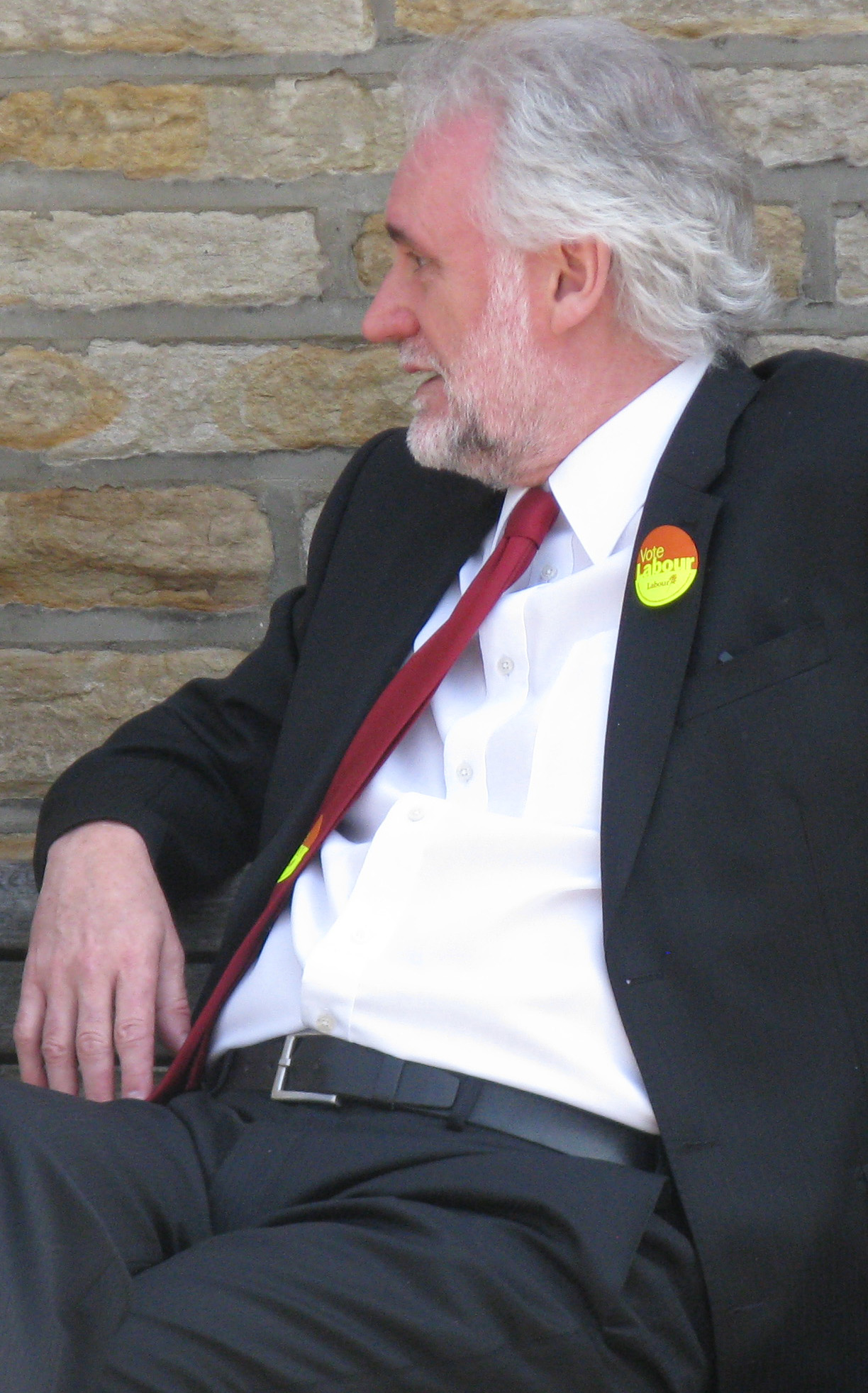
- Wood in 2011

Member of Parliament for Batley and Spen
- In office 2 May 1997 – 30 March 2015
- Preceded by: Elizabeth Peacock
- Succeeded by: Jo Cox

Personal details
- Born: Michael Roy Wood; 3 March 1946 (age 80) Crewe, Cheshire, England
- Party: Labour
- Education: Leeds Polytechnic (BA)

Michael Roy Wood (born 3 March 1946) is a British Labour politician who was Member of Parliament for Batley and Spen from 1997 to 2015. He was a member of the left-wing Socialist Campaign Group.

== Early life ==
Wood is the son of Rowland Wood, a foundry worker, and his wife Laura. He has two siblings.

He was educated at Nantwich and Acton Grammar School in Nantwich, and Salisbury and Wells Theological College in Salisbury, Wiltshire, where he gained a Certificate in Theology in 1974. From the University of Leeds he gained a CQSW (Certificate of Qualification in Social Work) in 1981. From Leeds Polytechnic he gained a BA in History and Politics in 1989. He was a probation officer and social worker from 1965 to 1997 before becoming an MP.

== Political life ==
From 1980 to 1988, he represented his then hometown Cleckheaton as a councillor; during that time, he was chairman of the housing committee and the social services committee and was deputy leader of Kirklees Council. In the 1987 election, he contested the safe Conservative seat of Hexham.

He joined the Labour Party in 1966, aged 20. His political interests are described as law and order, animal welfare, transport, employment, health and the environment. He was a member of the Parliamentary groups on homelessness, transport, Indo-British affairs, AIDS, animal welfare, multiple sclerosis, chronic fatigue syndrome, disablement, human rights, Kashmir and alcohol abuse. Wood was also secretary of Parliament's Drug and Alcohol Treatment and Harm Reduction group. In addition, he was an executive member of the All Party Penal Affairs Group. He is a patron of the National Association of British Market Authorities, a member of the Campaign for State Education and the Working Class Movement Library and a friend of Birzeit University in Palestine.

In 2003, he voted against parliamentary approval for the invasion of Iraq.

On 31 October 2006, Wood was one of 12 Labour MPs to back Plaid Cymru and the Scottish National Party's call for an inquiry into the Iraq War.

In May 2007 he became parliamentary manager for John McDonnell's campaign to challenge Gordon Brown for the leadership of the Labour Party following Tony Blair's resignation.

He stood down at the general election in 2015.

== Personal life ==
He has two stepdaughters, and a son and daughter from a previous marriage.

He lists his interests as reading, music, sport (particularly football), ornithology and walking. He was also the founder member of two workers' co-operatives.

== Notes ==
Parliament of the United Kingdom
Preceded by Elizabeth Peacock	Member of Parliament for Batley and Spen; 1997–2015	Succeeded by Jo Cox
