= Henry Turner =

Henry Turner may refer to:

== Politics ==
- Henry E. Turner (New York politician) (1832–1911), American politician, New York
- Henry G. Turner (1839–1904), American politician, Georgia
- Henry E. Turner (Massachusetts politician) (1842–1911), American politician, Massachusetts
- Henry Turner (Queensland politician) (1844–1932)
- Harry Turner (Australian politician) (Henry Basil Turner, 1905–1988)
- Lawrence Turner (1908-1977), full name Henry Frederic Lawrence Turner, British politician

== Other ==
- Hugh Turner (theologian) (Henry Ernest William Turner, 1907–1995), British theologian
- Henry Gyles Turner (1831–1920), Australian banker and historian
- Henry McNeal Turner (1833–1915), Bishop of the African Methodist Episcopal Church
- Henry Turner (endocrinologist) (1892–1970), first described Turner syndrome
- Henry Turner (baseball) (James Henry Turner, 1913-2000), American baseball player
- Henry Ashby Turner (1932–2008), American historian of Germany
- Henry Turner (basketball) (born 1966), American basketball player
- Henry E. Turner (Rhode Island physician) (1816–1897), physician and horticulturalist

== Fictional people ==
- Henry Turner, title character played by Harrison Ford in the film Regarding Henry
- Henry Turner (Pirates of the Caribbean)

== See also ==
- Harry Turner (disambiguation)
