= Batley and Spen =

UK Parliament constituency (1983–2024)

- Former borough constituency for the House of Commons
- 2010–2024 boundary of Batley and Spen in West Yorkshire

- Location of West Yorkshire within England
- County: West Yorkshire
- Population: 107,899 (2011 census)
- Electorate: 80,110 (December 2019)
- Major settlements: Batley, Cleckheaton, Birstall, Birkenshaw

1983–2024
- Seats: One
- Created from: Batley and Morley; Brighouse and Spenborough; Dewsbury
- Replaced by: Spen Valley; Dewsbury and Batley (part)

Batley and Spen was a constituency in the House of Commons of the UK Parliament. The most recent MP was Kim Leadbeater, a Labour politician, who was elected in a 2021 by-election by a 323-vote margin. The seat had returned Labour MPs since the 1997 general election.

In the 2023 review of Westminster constituencies, the town of Batley was moved to the new constituency of Dewsbury and Batley, and the remainder of the constituency was renamed Spen Valley. The new constituencies were first contested in the 2024 general election.

== Constituency profile ==
The area is in the rolling Pennines of West Yorkshire with considerable commerce, industry, retail and occupational trades. A lower percentage of social housing is present than the regional average, however most of the larger settlements have some social housing. The population in the district is ethnically diverse. Many of the towns in the Spen Valley have few residents from non-white heritage backgrounds (Birstall, Birkenshaw, Cleckheaton, Liversedge and Gomersal, generally more suburban and Conservative areas, with the exception of Cleckheaton, which has Liberal Democrat councillors). However, the constituency's largest town, Batley, has a sizeable number of residents with South Asian backgrounds, namely Pakistani (9.2%) and Indian (mostly Gujarati) (15.9%). Heckmondwike also has a well-established South Asian community with 16.9% residents having Pakistani heritage.

The results of the last fifty years show marginal majorities for Labour and for the Conservatives, and is considered to be part of the "red wall".

In the 2016 EU referendum, Batley and Spen voted 60% in favour of Brexit.

== Boundaries ==
Map of boundaries 2010-2024

- 1983–1997: The Metropolitan Borough of Kirklees wards of Batley East, Batley West, Birstall and Birkenshaw, Cleckheaton, Heckmondwike, and Spen.
- 1997–2010: The Metropolitan Borough of Kirklees wards of Batley East, Batley West, Birstall and Birkenshaw, Cleckheaton, and Spen.
- 2010–2024: The Metropolitan Borough of Kirklees wards of Batley East, Batley West, Birstall and Birkenshaw, Cleckheaton, Heckmondwike, and Liversedge and Gomersal.

The constituency was created in 1983 from parts of the seats of Batley and Morley, Brighouse and Spenborough and Dewsbury. This West Yorkshire constituency covers Batley, Birkenshaw, Birstall, Cleckheaton, East Bierley, Gomersal, Hunsworth, and Liversedge.

== History ==
The constituency did not exist in its present form before 1983 and has seen significant boundary changes since its creation – most notably those that took effect for the 1997 general election.

Heckmondwike was part of the seat from its creation in 1983 until 1997, when it was transferred to Dewsbury. Heckmondwike was returned to Batley and Spen for the 2010 general election.

The seat swung in Labour's favour in the elections of 1997, 2001 and 2005 though the Conservatives reduced the Labour majority in 2010 with a swing below the national average.

The electoral ward of Heckmondwike (which includes part of Liversedge) was considered part of the Spen Valley (although it was not part of the former Spenborough Urban District). Heckmondwike ward was for many years a Labour stronghold, but in the 2000s elected two BNP councillors. The BNP councillors were narrowly defeated by Labour in 2007 and 2008.

A by-election in 2016 occurred after the murder of Jo Cox, the sitting MP. Cox was killed on 16 June 2016 after being shot and stabbed multiple times by a man associated with far-right organisations. The Conservative Party, Liberal Democrats, UK Independence Party and the Green Party announced they would not contest the by-election as a mark of respect.

Another by-election occurred in 2021 following the resignation of Tracy Brabin MP, who was elected Mayor of West Yorkshire on 10 May. The 2021 by-election received considerable media attention because of expectations of a Labour loss following the earlier Hartlepool by-election and a high-profile campaign by George Galloway for the Workers Party of Britain. The by-election was despite the expectations won for Labour by Jo Cox's sister, Kim Leadbeater, with a reduced majority.

== Members of Parliament ==
Batley and Morley, Brighouse and Spenborough, and Dewsbury prior to 1983

Election	Member	Party
1983	Elizabeth Peacock	Conservative
1997	Mike Wood	Labour
2015	Jo Cox	Labour
2016 by-election	Tracy Brabin	Labour Co-op
2021 by-election	Kim Leadbeater	Labour
2024	Constituency abolished	

== Election results 1983–2024 ==
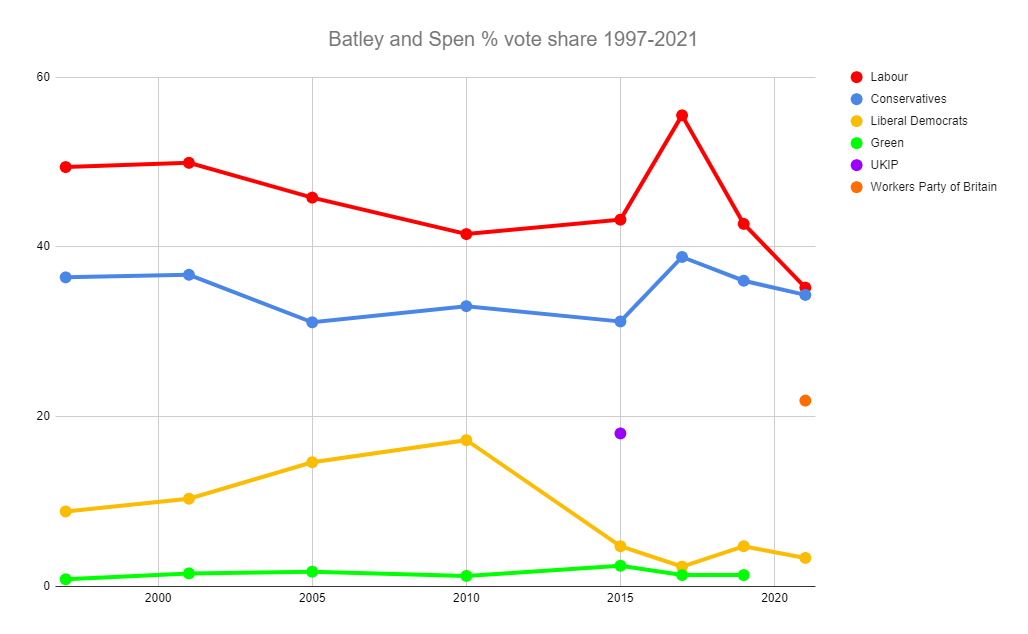
Batley and Spen vote share as a percentage 1997–2021 (note: the 2016 by-election is not shown as Labour were the only major party to stand)

=== Elections in the 1980s ===
General election 1983: Batley and Spen
Party	Candidate	Votes	%	±%
Conservative	Elizabeth Peacock	21,433	39.6	N/A
Labour	Kenneth Woolmer	20,563	38.0	N/A
SDP	Stephen Woollery	11,678	21.5	N/A
Ecology	Clive Lord	493	0.9	N/A
Majority		870	1.6	N/A
Turnout		54,167	73.4	N/A
Conservative win (new seat)				

General election 1987: Batley and Spen
Party	Candidate	Votes	%	±%
Conservative	Elizabeth Peacock	25,512	43.4	+3.8
Labour	Kenneth Woolmer	24,150	41.1	+3.1
SDP	Keith Burke	8,372	14.3	−7.2
Moderate Labour	Allan Harrison	689	1.2	N/A
Majority		1,362	2.3	+0.7
Turnout		58,723	79.0	+5.6
Conservative hold		Swing	+0.3	

=== Elections in the 1990s ===
General election 1992: Batley and Spen
Party	Candidate	Votes	%	±%
Conservative	Elizabeth Peacock	27,629	45.4	+2.0
Labour	Eunice Durkin	26,221	43.1	+2.0
Liberal Democrats	Gordon Beever	6,380	10.5	−3.8
Green	Clive Lord	628	1.0	N/A
Majority		1,408	2.3	0.0
Turnout		60,858	79.7	+0.7
Conservative hold		Swing	0.0	

General election 1997: Batley and Spen
Party	Candidate	Votes	%	±%
Labour	Mike Wood	23,213	49.4	+6.3
Conservative	Elizabeth Peacock	17,072	36.4	−9.0
Liberal Democrats	Kathryn Pinnock	4,133	8.8	−1.7
Referendum	Ed O.C. Wood	1,691	3.6	N/A
BNP	Ron Smith	472	1.0	N/A
Green	Clive Lord	384	0.8	−0.2
Majority		6,141	13.0	N/A
Turnout		46,965	73.2	−6.5
Labour gain from Conservative		Swing	+7.7	

=== Elections in the 2000s ===
General election 2001: Batley and Spen
Party	Candidate	Votes	%	±%
Labour	Mike Wood	19,224	49.9	+0.5
Conservative	Elizabeth Peacock	14,160	36.7	+0.3
Liberal Democrats	Kathryn Pinnock	3,989	10.3	+1.5
Green	Clive Lord	595	1.5	+0.7
UKIP	Allen Burton	574	1.5	N/A
Majority		5,064	13.2	+0.2
Turnout		38,542	60.5	−12.7
Labour hold		Swing	+0.1	

General election 2005: Batley and Spen
Party	Candidate	Votes	%	±%
Labour	Mike Wood	17,974	45.8	−4.1
Conservative	Robert Light	12,186	31.1	−5.6
Liberal Democrats	Neil Bentley	5,731	14.6	+4.3
BNP	Colin Auty	2,668	6.8	N/A
Green	Clive Lord	649	1.7	+0.2
Majority		5,788	14.7	+1.5
Turnout		39,208	62.3	+1.8
Labour hold		Swing	+0.8	

=== Elections in the 2010s ===
General election 2010: Batley and Spen
Party	Candidate	Votes	%	±%
Labour	Mike Wood	21,565	41.5	−3.7
Conservative	Janice Small	17,159	33.0	+1.3
Liberal Democrats	Neil Bentley	8,925	17.2	+1.8
BNP	David Exley	3,685	7.1	+1.1
Green	Matt Blakeley	605	1.2	−0.5
Majority		4,406	8.5	−5.0
Turnout		51,939	67.7	+6.9
Labour hold		Swing		

General election 2015: Batley and Spen
Party	Candidate	Votes	%	±%
Labour	Jo Cox	21,826	43.2	+1.7
Conservative	Imtiaz Ameen	15,769	31.2	−1.8
UKIP	Aleks Lukic	9,080	18.0	N/A
Liberal Democrats	John Lawson	2,396	4.7	−11.1
Green	Ian Bullock	1,232	2.4	+1.3
TUSC	Dawn Wheelhouse	123	0.2	N/A
Patriotic Socialist	Karl Varley	53	0.1	N/A
Majority		6,057	12.0	+3.5
Turnout		50,479	64.4	−3.4
Labour hold		Swing	+1.7	

By-election 2016: Batley and Spen (Note: Conservatives, UKIP, Greens and Liberal Democrats declined to field a candidate out of respect for the previous holder of the post, Jo Cox, who was murdered in office)
Party	Candidate	Votes	%	±%
Labour Co-op	Tracy Brabin	17,506	85.8	+42.6
English Democrat	Therese Muchewicz	969	4.8	N/A
BNP	David Furness	548	2.7	N/A
Independent	Garry Kitchin	517	2.5	N/A
English Independence	Corbyn Anti	241	1.2	N/A
Liberty GB	Jack Buckby	220	1.0	N/A
Independent	Henry Mayhew	153	0.8	N/A
Independent	Waqas Ali Khan	118	0.6	N/A
National Front	Richard Edmonds	87	0.4	N/A
One Love	Ankit Love	34	0.2	N/A
Majority		16,537	81.0	+68.0
Turnout		20,393	25.8	―38.6
Labour Co-op hold		Swing	N/A	

General election 2017: Batley and Spen
Party	Candidate	Votes	%	±%
Labour Co-op	Tracy Brabin	29,844	55.5	−30.3
Conservative	Ann Myatt	20,883	38.8	N/A
Liberal Democrats	John Lawson	1,224	2.3	N/A
Independent	Aleks Lukic	1,076	2.0	N/A
Green	Alan Freeman	695	1.3	N/A
Independent	Mohammed Hanif	58	0.1	N/A
Majority		8,961	16.7	+4.7
Turnout		53,780	67.1	+2.7
Labour Co-op hold		Swing	+2.3^{[a]}	

a. Swing is calculated from the 2015 election, not the 2016 by-election which was not contested by major parties. Aleks Lukic's vote change is in comparison to the 2015 election, when he stood as a UKIP candidate.

General election 2019: Batley and Spen
Party	Candidate	Votes	%	±%
Labour Co-op	Tracy Brabin	22,594	42.7	―12.8
Conservative	Mark Brooks	19,069	36.0	―2.8
Heavy Woollen Independents	Paul Halloran	6,432	12.2	N/A
Liberal Democrats	John Lawson	2,462	4.7	+2.4
Brexit Party	Clive Minihan	1,678	3.2	N/A
Green	Ty Akram	692	1.3	±0.0
Majority		3,525	6.7	―10.0
Turnout		52,927	66.5	―0.6
Labour Co-op hold		Swing	―5.0	

=== Elections in the 2020s ===
A by-election was held on 1 July 2021 following the resignation of MP Tracy Brabin to become Mayor of West Yorkshire.

By-election 2021: Batley and Spen
Party	Candidate	Votes	%	±%
Labour	Kim Leadbeater	13,296	35.3	―7.4
Conservative	Ryan Stephenson	12,973	34.4	―1.6
Workers Party	George Galloway	8,264	21.9	N/A
Liberal Democrats	Tom Gordon	1,254	3.3	―1.3
Yorkshire	Corey Robinson	816	2.2	N/A
English Democrat	Thérèse Hirst	207	0.5	N/A
UKIP	Jack Thomson	151	0.4	N/A
Monster Raving Loony	Howling Laud Hope	107	0.3	N/A
Alliance for Green Socialism	Mike Davies	104	0.3	N/A
CPA	Paul Bickerdike	102	0.3	N/A
Freedom Alliance	Jonathon Tilt	100	0.3	N/A
For Britain	Anne Marie Waters	97	0.3	N/A
Rejoin EU	Andrew Smith	75	0.2	N/A
SDP	Ollie Purser	66	0.1	N/A
Independent	Jayda Fransen	50	0.1	N/A
Heritage	Susan Laird	33	0.1	N/A
Majority		323	0.9	―5.8
Turnout		37,695	47.5	―19.0
Labour hold		Swing	―2.9	

== See also ==
- parliamentary constituencies in West Yorkshire
