= 2016 Batley and Spen by-election =

UK parliament by-election

- 20 October 2016

Batley and Spen constituency
- Turnout: 25.8% ▼38.6 pp

	First party	Second party
Candidate	Tracy Brabin	Thérèse Hirst
Party	Labour Co-op	English Democrat
Popular vote	17,506	969
Percentage	85.8%	4.8%
Swing	▲42.6 pp	New
MP before election
Jo Cox
Labour
Elected MP
Tracy Brabin
Labour Co-op

A by-election for the United Kingdom parliamentary constituency of Batley and Spen was held on 20 October 2016, triggered by the murder of incumbent Labour Party Member of Parliament (MP), Jo Cox, on 16 June of that year. The Labour candidate, Tracy Brabin, won with 85.8% of the vote. Out of respect for Cox, all other parties with parliamentary representation did not stand candidates. Nine candidates entered, primarily far-right figures and activists contested against Labour, and none reached the 5% threshold to keep their deposit.

It took place on the same day as the 2016 Witney by-election, which was held to fill former Prime Minister David Cameron's seat.

== Candidates ==
The Conservative Party, the Liberal Democrats, UKIP and the Green Party all declined to contest the election, as a mark of respect. Brendan Cox, Jo Cox's widower, also ruled out standing for the seat.

Labour began selecting a candidate on 14 September. The Batley-born actress Tracy Brabin and the Keighley-based campaigner, Jane Thomas, were shortlisted for selection on 19 September. Brabin won the selection on 23 September. She had campaigned for Cox at the 2015 election, and had been told by her that "you should be an MP".

On 18 July, the English Democrats announced that its deputy chairman, Thérèse Hirst, a former leader of Veritas, would be its candidate. Hirst (as Therese Muchewicz) stood in Bradford West at the 2015 general election, but came last with 98 votes (0.2%). She was again its candidate for West Yorkshire in the 2016 Police and Crime Commissioner elections, where she again had the least support, with 20,656 votes (3.9%). She had previously stood for Veritas in Bradford South in 2005.

The British National Party (BNP) chose David Furness, who had earlier that year received 0.5% of votes in the London mayoral election. The National Front chose the veteran campaigner Richard Edmonds, a perennial candidate for them and the BNP who came last with 49 votes in Carshalton and Wallington in the 2015 general election. On 18 June 2016, Liberty GB announced that Jack Buckby, a former BNP politician, would be its candidate in the by-election. Liberty GB registered the description "No to terrorism, yes to Britain", which appeared on the ballot paper instead of the party name. Neil Humphrey stood for the English Independence Party as Corbyn Anti (and so was listed as "Anti Corbyn" on the ballot paper); this new party supported English nationalism.

Waqas Ali Khan stood as an independent; he was the UKIP candidate for Shipley at the 2015 general election, coming third of six candidates. Garry Kitchin previously stood for the Green Party in local elections. He was the only candidate registered to an address in the constituency. A London-based musician, Ankit Love, stood for the One Love Party, which campaigns against air pollution. He contested several elections earlier in the year, including the London mayoral election.

== Result ==
The result was declared at 1:45 am at Cathedral House in Huddersfield. Brabin held the seat for Labour on one of the lowest turnouts for a parliamentary by-election since the end of the Second World War. All other candidates polled less than 5% of the vote and lost their deposits. Brabin was heckled by some of the other candidates as she delivered her speech at the declaration of the result. In her speech she said, "Tonight is a bittersweet occasion for me. That this by-election had to take place at all is a tragedy. Whether you voted for me, voted for other candidates or didn't vote at all, I give you my word, I will be equally strong for each and every one of you." She thanked the parties who chose not to contest the election and declared a victory for "unity and hope". Cox's widower, Brendan, was pleased that the far-right candidates lost their deposits.

By-election 2016: Batley and Spen
Party	Candidate	Votes	%	±%
Labour	Tracy Brabin	17,506	85.8	+42.6
English Democrat	Thérèse Hirst	969	4.8	n/a
BNP	David Furness	548	2.7	n/a
Independent	Garry Kitchin	517	2.5	n/a
English Independence	Corbyn Anti	241	1.2	n/a
Liberty GB	Jack Buckby	220	1.1	n/a
Independent	Henry Mayhew	153	0.8	n/a
Independent	Waqas Ali Khan	118	0.6	n/a
National Front	Richard Edmonds	87	0.4	n/a
One Love	Ankit Love	34	0.2	n/a
Majority		16,537	81.0	+69.0
Turnout		20,393	25.8	–38.6
Rejected ballots		171		
Labour hold		Swing	n/a	

== 2015 result ==
General election 2015: Batley and Spen
Party	Candidate	Votes	%	±%
Labour Co-op	Jo Cox	21,826	43.2	+1.7
Conservative	Imtiaz Ameen	15,769	31.2	–1.8
UKIP	Aleks Lukic	9,080	18.0	n/a
Liberal Democrats	John Lawson	2,396	4.7	–11.1
Green	Ian Bullock	1,232	2.4	+1.3
TUSC	Dawn Wheelhouse	123	0.2	n/a
Patriotic Socialist	Karl Varley	53	0.1	n/a
Majority		6,057	12.0	
Turnout		50,479	64.4	
Labour Co-op hold		Swing	+1.7	

== See also ==
- 2021 Batley and Spen by-election, another by-election for the constituency
- 2022 Southend West by-election, another by-election which was held under similar circumstances
- List of United Kingdom by-elections (2010–present)
