= Harry Turner (cricketer) =

English cricketer

Personal information
- Full name: Harry Turner
- Born: 6 April 1879; Birkenshaw, Yorkshire, England
- Died: 23 October 1939 (aged 60); Shrewsbury, Shropshire, England
- Batting: Right-handed
- Bowling: Right-arm fast-medium

Domestic team information
- Years: Team
- 1913: Scotland
- 1923–1925: Durham

Career statistics
Competition	First-class
Matches	2
Runs scored	32
Batting average	8.00
100s/50s	–/–
Top score	22
Balls bowled	157
Wickets	1
Bowling average	89.00
5 wickets in innings	–
10 wickets in match	–
Best bowling	1/14
Catches/stumpings	5/–
- Source: Cricinfo, 22 October 2022

Harry Turner (6 April 1879 – 23 October 1939) was an English first-class cricketer.

Turner was born in April 1879 at Birkenshaw, Yorkshire. A professional cricketer, Turner played club cricket for Rishton in the Lancashire League in 1908 and 1909, before proceeding to Scotland where he played for Ayr. In 1913, he selected in the Scotland team for two first-class matches against Oxford University at Oxford, and Surrey at The Oval. He scored 32 runs in these two matches, in addition to taking a single wicket. Following the First World War, Turner played club cricket in County Durham and played minor counties cricket for Durham in 1923 and 1925, making five appearances in the Minor Counties Championship. He later coached cricket at Shrewsbury School for a number of years. Turner died at his home in Shrewsbury on 23 October 1939.
