= Great Horton Road (Cricket Ground) =

Former cricket ground in Bradford, England

Coordinates: 53°47′20.96″N 1°45′58.01″W

Great Horton Road was a cricket ground in Bradford, West Yorkshire, England on which Yorkshire County Cricket Club held first class matches from 1863 to 1874. The ground hosted seven County Championship and one other first class match during that time. That match saw Yorkshire pitted against a United South of England XI with the home team winning by 26 runs despite having been bowled out for 64 in their own first innings when Allen Hill and George Ulyett bowled the visitors out for 39 when chasing just 65 to win. In the last first class match played at the venue, a Roses Match in 1874, William McIntyre took 8 for 35 for Lancashire in their innings victory. The ground was sold for development and is currently covered by housing on Pemberton Drive and the eastern halves of Sherborne Road and Merton Road.

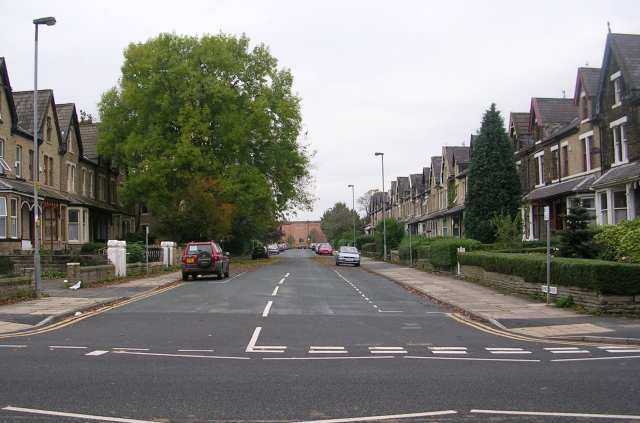
Pemberton Drive, the location of the former cricket ground (2007)
