= Benjamin Lister (English cricketer) =

English cricketer

Benjamin Lister (9 December 1850 – 3 December 1919) was an English first-class cricketer, who played six matches for Yorkshire County Cricket Club from 1874 to 1878, and one match for the Players of the North in 1878. He also appeared in two non first-class matches for Yorkshire, against Scotland in Edinburgh, during May of that year.

Born in Birkenshaw, Yorkshire, England, Lister was a good all-round player, who appeared for Harrogate C.C. in 1881 and 1882. He was an amateur when he first represented Yorkshire, but later turned professional. A right-handed batsman and occasional wicket-keeper, he scored 46 runs at an average of 4.60, with a best score of 19 not out for the Players of the North against an England XI in Dewsbury, Yorkshire. He also took two catches.

Lister died in Bradford, Yorkshire in December 1919, aged 68.
