= Harry Moreton Stanley Turner =

Wing Commander Henry Morton Stanley Turner MBE FRSE (1875–1951) was an English physician who served as senior medical advisor to the RAF between the First and Second World Wars.

== Life ==
He was born in Hanley, Staffordshire on 2 December 1875. He appears to have been named after the English journalist Henry Morton Stanley, a local hero at the time of his birth. He is thought to have studied medicine at the University of Edinburgh and in 1899 he was practicing in London.

In 1906 he was living with his family in Wandsworth in London.

In 1909 he moved with his family to the Falkland Islands in the South Atlantic, as GP in Stanley. He also appears to have been a Major in the Territorial Force (later the Territorial Army). At the outbreak of the First World War he became Commander of the island's defence force. In 1915, feeling he would be of more practical use in Europe, he joined the Royal Army Medical Corps and served tending the Royal Flying Corps in France as part of the 4/11th Field Ambulance. He received a Military MBE in 1919 for his work.

In August 1919 he was commissioned as a squadron leader in the Royal Air Force. From then until 1930 he served as their Principal Medical Officer. He rose to the rank of Wing Commander.

He was elected a Fellow of the Royal Society of Edinburgh in 1925. His proposers were Edward Hindle, William Fraser Hume, William A. Guthrie, John William Henry Eyre and Sir Frederick Hobday.

He died on 5 February 1951 in Guy's Hospital in London.

== Family ==
In 1900 he married Isabella Philip (1869-1915), they had four children. His wife died in 1915 and he married Dorothy Muriel Bayley (1888-1946).
