= Elizabeth Peacock =

British politician

Member of Parliament for Batley and Spen
- In office 9 June 1983 – 8 April 1997
- Preceded by: Constituency established
- Succeeded by: Mike Wood

Personal details
- Born: Elizabeth Joan Gates; 4 September 1937 (age 88)
- Party: Conservative
- Spouse: Brian David (m. 1957)
- Children: 2

Elizabeth Joan Peacock (née Gates; born 4 September 1937) is a retired British politician, serving as Member of Parliament for Batley and Spen from 1983 to 1997.

Peacock served as a North Yorkshire County Councillor from 1981 to 1984, and represented Batley and Spen from 1983 to 1997, during which time she was the parliamentary private secretary to Nicholas Scott as Minister for Social Security and Disabled People Unit (1992). Peacock was opposed to abortion, and sometimes advocated direct action. In the debate on the Abortion Amendment Law in January 1988, she was a supporter of the Bill, speaking out for lowering the time-frame in which a legal abortion is permitted, originally standing at 28 weeks, in the Abortion (Amendment) Bill. Peacock stood again in the 2001 election, unsuccessfully, and declined to stand in the 2005 election.

She was interviewed in 2012 as part of The History of Parliament's oral history project.

Peacock continues to be interviewed occasionally on political issues; for example, in April 2019 she appeared on the BBC's regional politics programme, Sunday Politics, supporting Brexit.

In reference to the 2021 Batley and Spen by-election, Peacock said that the respect must be earned in the Red wall.

Parliament of the United Kingdom
New constituency	Member of Parliament for Batley and Spen; 1983–1997	Succeeded by Mike Wood
