= Harold Turner (footballer) =

Australian rules footballer, born 1907

Personal information
- Full name: Harold James Turner
- Born: 3 December 1907; Carlton, Victoria
- Died: 5 March 1992 (aged 84); Frankston, Victoria
- Original team: Carlton district but might be Queenscliff
- Height: 182 cm (6 ft 0 in)
- Weight: 81 kg (179 lb)
- Positions: half back, ruck rover
- Other occupation: motor mechanic, soldier

Playing career^{1}
| Years | Club | Games (Goals) |
| 1929 | Maffra | |
| 1930 | Somerville (first part) | |
| 1930 | Langwarrin (second part) | |
| 1931 | Queenscliff | |
| 1932 | West Albury | |
| 1933 | Richmond VFL reserves | |
| 1934 | Hawthorn | Snr 1 (0) Res (unknown) |
| 1935, 1937 | Sorrento | 26 (unknown) |
| 1936 | unknown | |
| 1938-40 | Queenscliff Garrison | |
- ^{1} Playing statistics correct to the end of 1934.

Career highlights
- 1930 Langwarrin premiership player; 1931 Queenscliff premiership player and vice captain; 1935 Sorrento premiership captain and coach; 1935 Kirton Medal (A Grade Best Player) Runner Up

Harold James Turner (3 December 1907 – 5 March 1992) was an Australian rules footballer who played with Hawthorn in the Victorian Football League (VFL).
