= Birkenshaw, West Yorkshire =

Village in West Yorkshire, England

Coordinates: 53.7475°N 1.6934°W

Birkenshaw
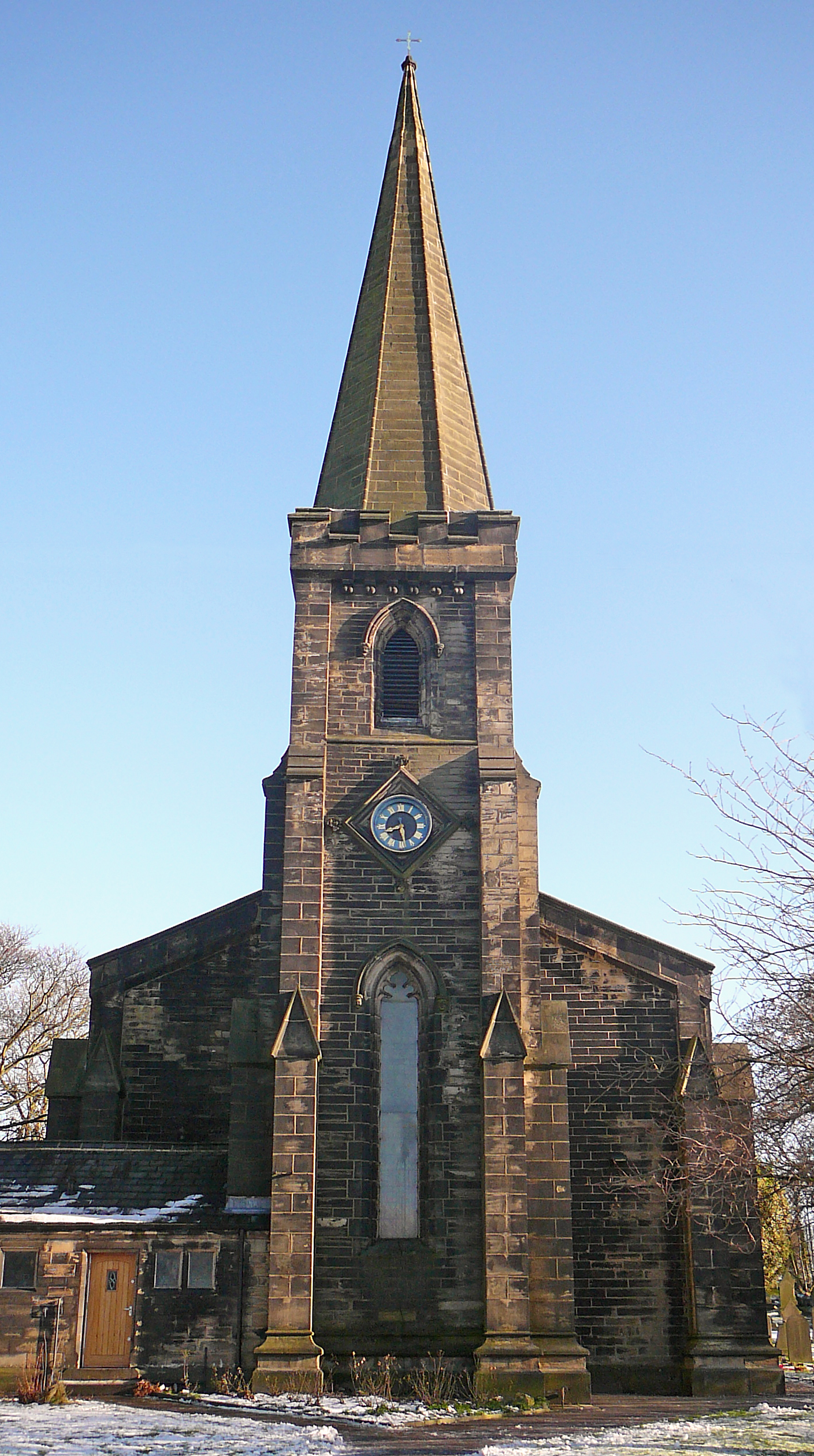
- St Paul's Church

- Location within West Yorkshire
- OS grid reference: SE203279
- Metropolitan borough: Kirklees
- Metropolitan county: West Yorkshire
- Region: Yorkshire and the Humber
- Country: England
- Sovereign state: United Kingdom
- Post town: BRADFORD
- Postcode district: BD11
- Dialling code: 01274, 0113
- Police: West Yorkshire
- Fire: West Yorkshire
- Ambulance: Yorkshire
- UK Parliament: Spen Valley

Birkenshaw is a village in the borough of Kirklees in the county of West Yorkshire, England. It lies at the crossroads between the A58 Leeds to Halifax road and the A651 Bradford to Heckmondwike road. At the 2011 census, the village was located in the ward of Birstall and Birkenshaw, which had a population 16,298. Birkenshaw forms part of the Heavy Woollen District.

It is the site of the headquarters of the West Yorkshire Fire and Rescue Service.

== History ==
The name of the village derives from Old English and means "Birch Wood".

Birkenshaw was formerly a chapelry in the parish of Birstall, in 1894 Birkenshaw became an urban district, on 31 December 1894 Birkenshaw became a civil parish, being formed from the part of the parish of Gomersal in Birkenshaw Urban District, on 1 April 1937 the district was abolished to form the Municipal Borough of Spenborough. On 1 April 1937 the parish was also abolished and merged with Gomersal. In 1931 the parish had a population of 2816.

== Transportation ==
The village used to have a railway station (Birkenshaw and Tong) on the former Leeds, Bradford and Halifax Junction Railway. It was closed to passengers in 1953 and closed completely in 1964.

== Facilities ==
There are two schools in the village, Birkenshaw Primary School and BBG Academy, a church and two playgrounds.

The village has three pubs - The Golden Fleece, The Halfway House and The George IV – and one social club, Birkenshaw Liberal Club.

There are two restaurants, The Grand Cru. and Heath-field Farm.

This village also has some sporting teams such as the Birkenshaw Bluedogs (rugby league) and the Birkenshaw Bells (netball).

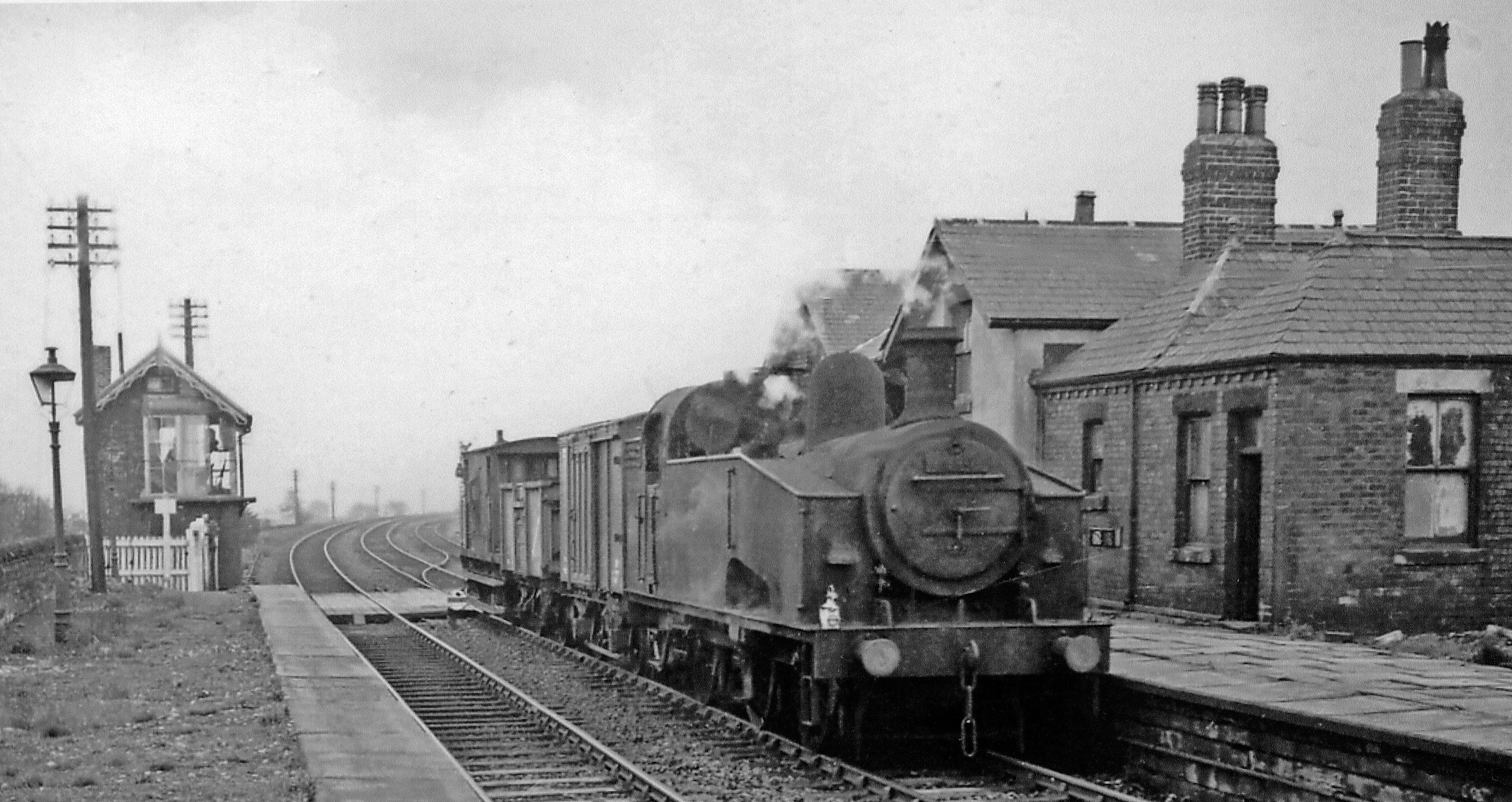
Birkenshaw and Tong station closed in 1953

== Notable people ==
People from Birkenshaw:

- Benjamin Lister (1850–1919), cricketer
- Michael McGowan (born 1940), politician
- Emanuel Scott (1834–1898), cricketer
- Harry Turner (1879–1939), cricketer
