= Swatter's Carr (cricket ground) =

Sports venue in Middlesbrough, England

Coordinates: 54.569°N 1.237°W

Swatter's Carr, also known as the Linthorpe Road East Ground, in Middlesbrough, England held two first-class cricket matches. In September 1864 Yorkshire CCC played Kent CCC and in 1867 it hosted a Roses Match. Yorkshire beat Lancashire by an innings after bowling the visitors out for 97 and 68. The ground was sold for development in 1874 but is now an open space once again.
