= Heavy Woollen District Independents =

Localised political party in West Yorkshire, England

The Heavy Woollen District Independents was a political party based in the Heavy Woollen District of West Yorkshire, England. The party was registered with the Electoral Commission on 13 September 2017. Its leader was Aleks Lukic, who was the chairman of UKIP's Dewsbury, Batley and Spen branch until 2017.

Lukic was elected to Kirklees Council in 2019, as councillor for the Dewsbury East ward, by 71 votes.

Paul Halloran stood for the party in the 2019 United Kingdom general election in Batley and Spen, coming third and holding his deposit with 12.2% of the vote.

The party went by a variety of descriptions, including:

- Dewsbury Borough Independents — Heavy Woollen District
- Batley Borough Independents — Heavy Woollen District
- Spen Valley Independents — Heavy Woollen District

A full list can be found at the Electoral Commission website. The party was deregistered in March 2022.
