= Hall Park Ground =

Cricket ground in Horsforth, West Yorkshire, England

Coordinates: 53°50′09.34″N 1°38′48.84″W

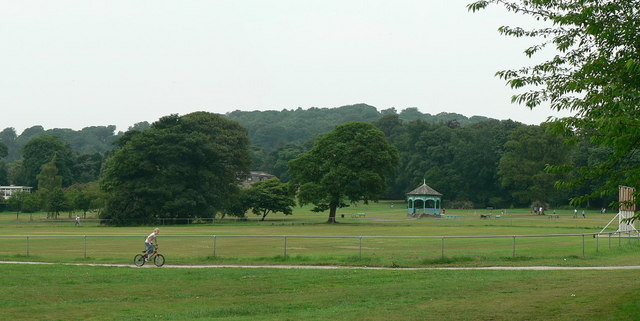

Ground information
- Location: Horsforth, Yorkshire
- Establishment: 1885 (first recorded match)

Team information
Yorkshire	(1885)
- As of 24 August 2010; Source: Ground profile

Hall Park Ground in Horsforth, near Leeds, Yorkshire, England is a cricket ground. The ground was the location of a first-class cricket match in August 1885 which pitted Yorkshire CCC against MB Hawke's XI.

The match was won by MB Hawke's XI by 3 wickets thanks to Australian Claude Rock who took 8 for 36 in Yorkshire's second innings.

Currently the Horsforth Hall Park Cricket Club play at this ground in the Airedale-Wharfedale Senior Cricket League.
