= Alison Lowe, Baroness Lowe of Armley =

Deputy Mayor of West Yorkshire for Policing and Crime

The Right Honourable The Baroness Lowe of Armley OBE
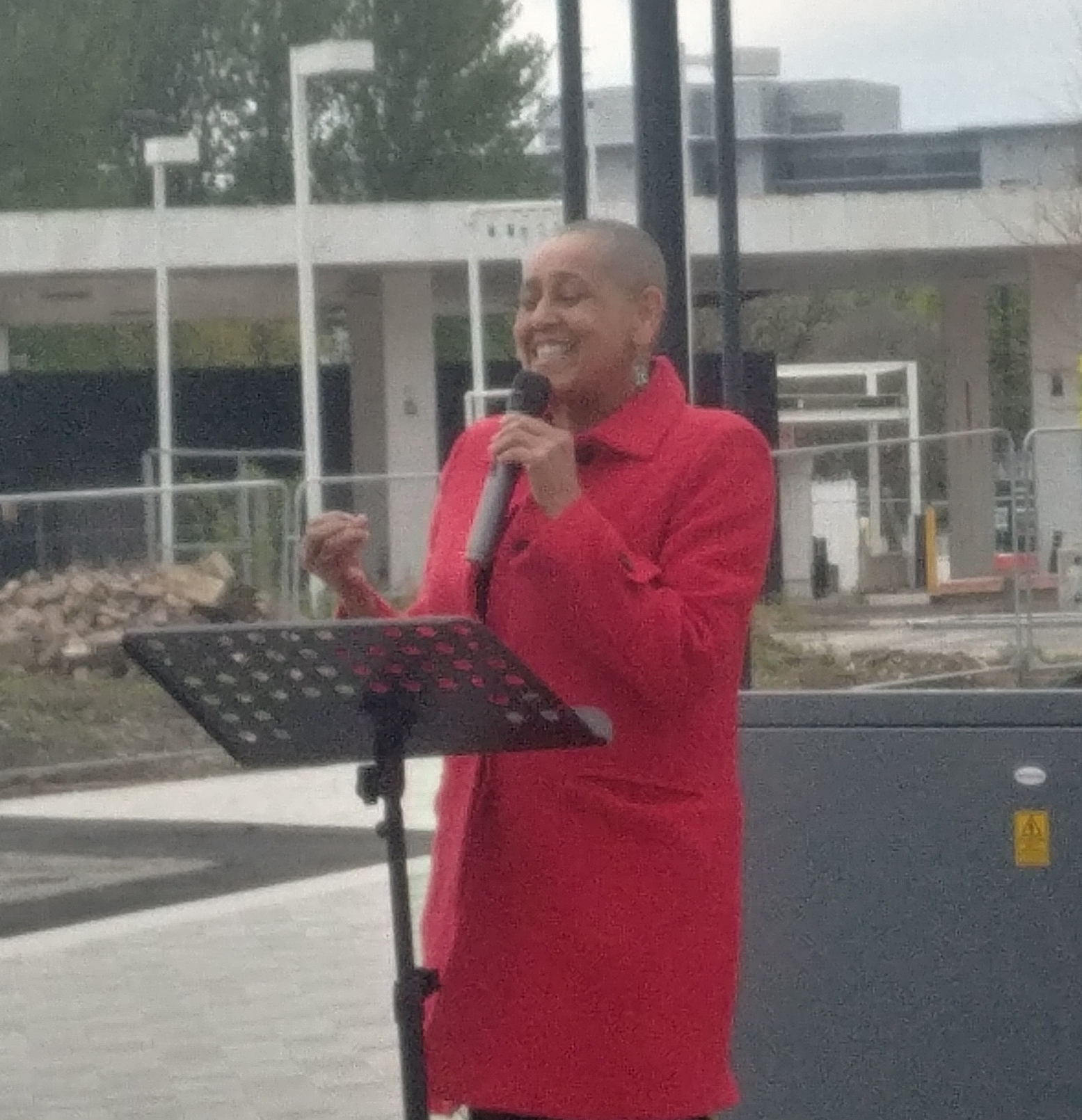
- Lowe in 2022

Member of the House of Lords
- Lord Temporal
- Life peerage 18 August 2026

Deputy Mayor of West Yorkshire for Policing and Crime
- Incumbent
- Assumed office 18 June 2021
- Mayor: Tracy Brabin
- Preceded by: Mark Burns-Williamson (Note: as Police and Crime Commissioner for West Yorkshire.)

Leeds City Councillor for Armley Ward
- In office 1990–2019
- Preceded by: M. P. Roberts
- Succeeded by: Lou Cunningham

Personal details
- Born: 1964 (age 61–62) Leeds, England
- Party: Labour
- Children: 2, including Adam
- Education: University of Leeds

Alison Natalie Kay Lowe, Baroness Lowe of Armley OBE is a British Labour politician and life peer serving as deputy mayor of West Yorkshire for Policing and Crime. She was the first black woman Leeds city councillor, serving from 1990 to 2019, and has served as the chief executive of Touchstone, a mental health charity based in Leeds, from 2004 to 2021.

Lowe won the 2014 Forward Business Woman of the Year award and Stonewall Senior Champion of the Year in 2015.

== Personal life ==
Lowe was born in 1964. Her father had emigrated to Leeds from Saint Kitts in 1956 and her Leeds-born mother, Kay, was of Irish descent. Her mother became pregnant with Lowe's older brother at 20 years old and was subsequently evicted from her family home. Her parents were married in 1961. Lowe was raised with her three siblings (an older brother and sister, and a younger sister) in Seacroft. In 1965, her third sister died in a road traffic accident aged three. Lowe attended Parklands Girls High School. She has described her family as like the "Heinz 57 Varieties" due to its diversity.

After marrying at 20 years old, she had two children at 21 and 23, while living in Chapeltown. Her eldest child is poet and writer Adam Lowe.

Lowe studied history at the University of Leeds, beginning her undergraduate degree three weeks after the birth of her second child, a daughter, in 1987. Following the completion of a BA thesis on Edward II of England in 1990, entitled "Homosexuality in the Middle Ages", Lowe later graduated with a master's degree in medieval studies in 1993.

Lowe is a distant relative of Annie Elizabeth Kaye, an Irish immigrant to South Yorkshire, who was the first woman councillor of her district in Conisborough, as well as the district's first Council Chairwoman, the first woman Magistrate to be appointed to serve on the Doncaster Bench, and the second woman ever appointed magistrate in Yorkshire.

Lowe and her family participated in the ITV fly-on-the-wall documentary, Family Life, in 1999. She has distant Nigerian heritage on her father's side.

== Career ==
Whilst studying at university, Lowe was elected to Leeds City Council to represent the Armley ward in 1990, thus becoming the first black woman councillor to serve on the council. She held multiple positions during her time in office, including Deputy Lord Mayor, an executive member (sitting on the council's ruling cabinet) and chair of the West Yorkshire Police and Crime Panel (overseeing the work of West Yorkshire Police).

Alongside her commitments as a Leeds city councillor, Lowe worked for numerous homelessness charities before, in 2004, she became CEO of Touchstone, a Leeds-based mental health charity. In May 2021, Lowe handed in her three-months notice after being CEO of Touchstone for over 17 years and announced she would step down as to become the deputy mayor Policing and Crime of West Yorkshire.

After 29 years' continuous service as a councillor, she retired from the council at the 2019 election and, in 2020, was made an honorary alderwoman of Leeds. One of her first roles in this capacity was to chair a review of statues in the city in response to criticisms of the city's statuary in connection with the Black Lives Matter movement.

She previously attempted to become a Labour Party prospective parliamentary candidate on multiple occasions but was never selected by a Constituency Labour Party. She was shortlisted but lost the Leeds North East candidate selection for the 1997 general election to Liz Davies. Ahead of the 2010 election, Rachel Reeves beat Lowe for Leeds West, despite Lowe being a local councillor within the constituency. Most recently, before the 2015 election, Jo Cox was selected over Lowe for Batley and Spen, although Lowe lived in Birstall in the constituency.

On 12 May 2021, Lowe was appointed as the inaugural deputy mayor of West Yorkshire for Policing and Crime by the first West Yorkshire Mayor Tracy Brabin. The role was officially confirmed on 18 June 2021.

Lowe was appointed Officer of the Order of the British Empire (OBE) in the 2022 New Year Honours for services to mental health and wellbeing during COVID-19.

In July 2022, Lowe was awarded an honorary Doctorate of Laws by the University of Leeds, on the basis of "Alison’s personal commitment to speaking up for the marginalised and to promoting the importance of frank and open discussion about mental health extends into her professional commitments."

Lowe's name is one of those featured on the sculpture Ribbons, unveiled in 2024.

Lowe was nominated for a peerage in the July 2026 political peerages. She was created Baroness Lowe of Armley, of Seacroft in the City of Leeds on 18 August 2026. She sits in the House of Lords as a Labour Party peer.
