= Weaver Network =

Franchised bus network in West Yorkshire, England

Overview
- Owner: West Yorkshire Combined Authority
- Area served: West Yorkshire
- Transit type: Bus; Cycling; Pedestrian; Tram (planned); Commuter rail
- Number of stations: Bus stops: 14,000; Railway stations: 69
- Chief executive: Tracy Brabin
- Headquarters: Wellington House, Leeds
- Website: www.wyweaver.com

Operation
- Operation will start: 2027
- Operators: First West Yorkshire; Transdev Blazefield

The Weaver Network is a planned network of franchised bus services across West Yorkshire within the boundaries of the West Yorkshire Combined Authority, created under the bus franchising provisions of the Bus Services Act 2017. First announced in March 2024 by Mayor of West Yorkshire Tracy Brabin, the network is set to commence operations in 2027 in parts of Kirklees, Leeds and Wakefield, replacing bus operations currently run by the West Yorkshire Metro as well as the region's commercial bus operators. The brand is also set to incorporate the future West Yorkshire mass transit system from 2028 onwards.

== History ==
=== Deregulation ===
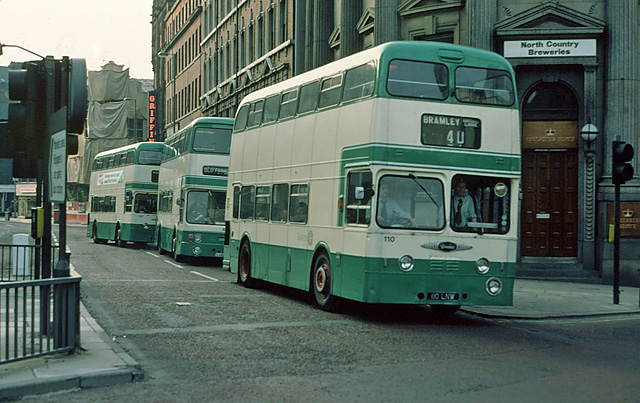
West Yorkshire PTE Daimler Fleetlines on Boar Lane, Leeds in August 1979

Upon the creation of the metropolitan county of West Yorkshire on 1 April 1974, West Yorkshire Passenger Transport Executive (WYPTE) was formed to run the bus and rail services of the new county. Urban bus services provided by municipally-owned operators in Leeds, Bradford, Halifax, Huddersfield were brought under the PTE's control, which branded its services as 'Metro' (later rebranded 'MetroBus') and painted buses in a unified 'verona green and buttermilk' livery. From 1977, some regional services operated in co-operation with state-owned National Bus Company subsidiaries West Riding, West Yorkshire and Yorkshire Woollen were branded 'MetroNational' until the scheme's abolition by the PTE in 1984.

The Transport Act 1985 ordered the deregulation of bus services across Great Britain, as well as the break-up of the six passenger transport executives and the National Bus Company, all of which began taking effect from 26 October 1986. WYPTE's bus operations were spun off into an 'arm's length' company named Yorkshire Rider, originally ran by the West Yorkshire Passenger Transport Authority but sold into privatisation two years later to Yorkshire Rider employees and management in a £20 million (equivalent to £59,737,000 in 2025) management buyout in October 1988. The newly-privatised Yorkshire Rider later absorbed the operations of the AJS Group's West Yorkshire Road Car Company upon the latter's closure in 1989.

As of May 2025, nineteen different bus operators run public bus services in West Yorkshire, with the three largest bus operators in the county being First West Yorkshire, who purchased Yorkshire Rider in 1995, Arriva Yorkshire, who purchased West Riding Buses and Yorkshire Woollen in 1996, and Transdev Blazefield's Keighley Bus Company. A small number of services are run directly by or on contract to West Yorkshire Metro, the direct successor to West Yorkshire PTE.

=== Public consultations ===
The Bus Services Act 2017 granted combined authorities such as the West Yorkshire Combined Authority the ability to partially re-regulate their local bus services, permitting them to franchise services to commercial bus operators in a similar system to those operated by Transport for London. A public consultation was held by the Combined Authority between October 2023 and January 2024 into either franchising West Yorkshire's bus services or working with existing operators in an Enhanced Partnership, resulting in 82% of respondents either approving or approving in part of franchising buses.

On 14 March 2024, Tracy Brabin announced that buses within the West Yorkshire Combined Authority would be franchised starting in 2027, with the announcement of a unified Weaver Network brand additionally taking place in May 2025.

== Franchising process ==
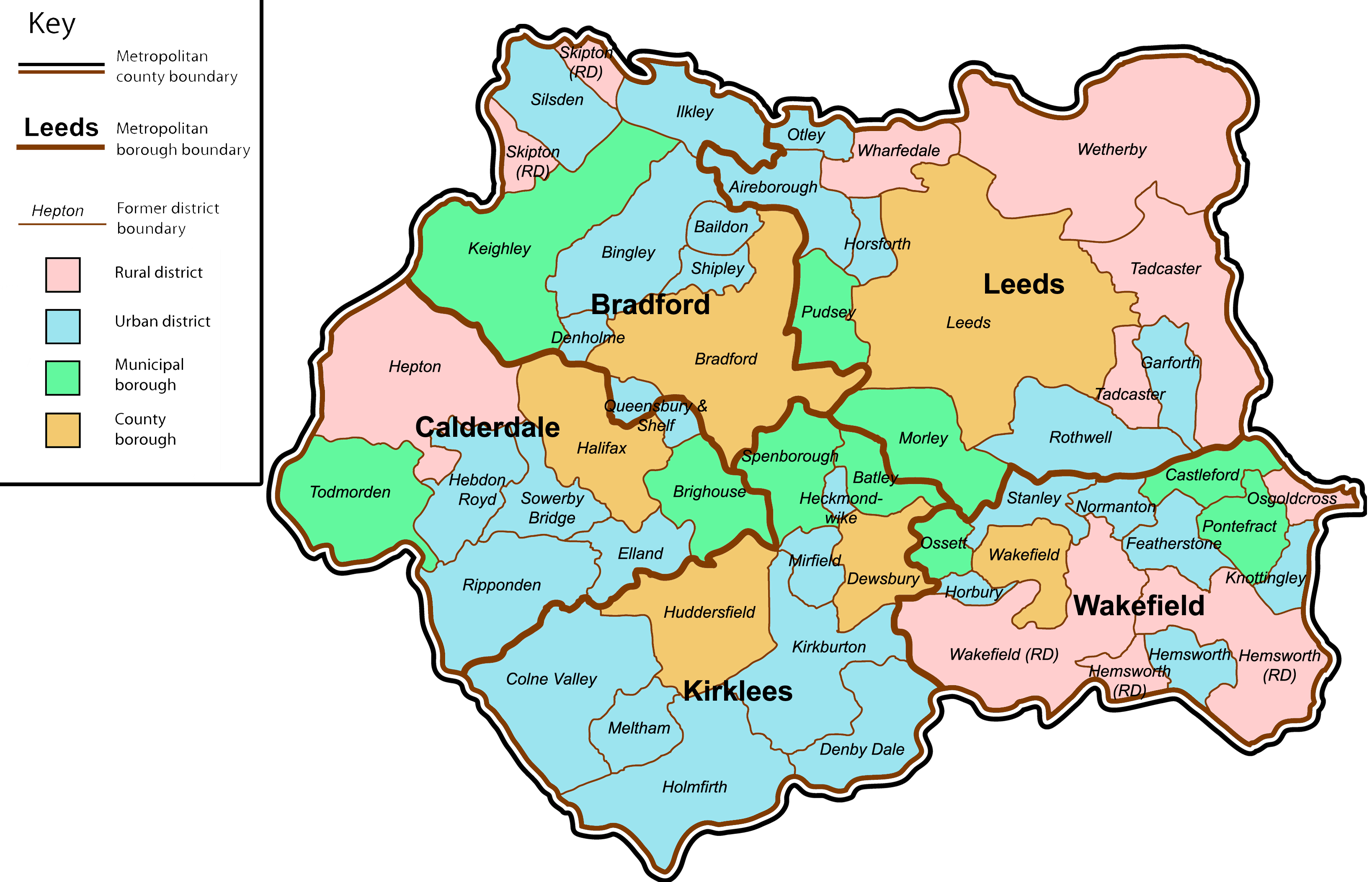
The boundaries of West Yorkshire's metropolitan boroughs where Weaver Network bus services will operate within

A Weaver Network-branded map outside Leeds railway station, placed prior to the network's vehicle rollout.

The rollout of Weaver Network bus service franchising will split West Yorkshire into nine geographic zones, with the City of Leeds being split into two zones to account for its large population. Franchised bus services in the Heavy Woollen District, Kirklees and one of the two Leeds zones will begin in May 2027, with an invitation to tender for operator franchise contracts launched on 20 August 2025. The Weaver Network rollout is set to be completed by the end of 2028.

Franchise contracts for these nine zones are to be split into three tiers:

- Tier A: encompasses the whole zone and centred on a 'strategically important' depot
- Tier B: smaller and simpler local routes within a zone
- Tier C: home-to-school transport within a zone

Tier A contracts are aimed towards larger bus operating companies, while contracts under Tiers B and C are aimed towards small and medium enterprises (SMEs) such as local independent bus and coach operators.

As of October 2025, the 25 operators bidding for Weaver Network service contracts included:

Tier A only	Tier A, parts of Tiers B and C	Tiers B and C only
ComfortDelGro (Metroline (Note: Tendered through a new company named Metroline West Yorkshire))	Ascendal Group (Whippet)	A. Lyles & Son
Transport UK Group	Arriva UK Bus (Arriva Yorkshire)	B&H Travel
	DM Motor Services	Connexionsbuses
	FirstGroup (First West Yorkshire)	J&B Travel (Note: Autonomous subsidiary of First West Yorkshire)
	Go-Ahead Group	Kilvingtons of Leeds
	Mobico Group (National Express)	Lether's Travel
	Rotala (Diamond North West)	Ross Travel
	Stagecoach Group (Stagecoach Yorkshire)	SquarePeg
	Tower Transit	Stotts Coaches
	Transdev Blazefield	Stringers
		Tetley's Coaches
TLC Travel
West Yorkshire Travel

On 19 August 2026, West Yorkshire Combined Authority (WYCA) announced intentions to award Tier A franchises for services in Huddersfield and parts of Leeds to First West Yorkshire, while a franchise for services in Dewsbury is planned to be also awarded to Transdev Blazefield, each subject to contracts being signed on 29 August. The announcement received criticism from passenger advocacy group Better Buses for West Yorkshire due to First Bus's underperformance in a recent survey, referring to it as one of "Britain's worst bus operators". Local bus operator SquarePeg also criticised the bidding process, sending all 20 of their buses in a convoy to WYCA's headquarters at Wellington House in Leeds, claiming that the bidding process puts them at risk of going out of business.

On 7 September 2026, WYCA announced it had awarded three Tier B franchises in Dewsbury to the Stagecoach and Go-Ahead groups, four Tier B franchises in Huddersfield to Stotts Coaches, Tower Transit and Transdev Blazefield, and two Tier B franchises in parts of Leeds to the Go-Ahead Group and Tower Transit. Three Tier C home-to-school contracts in Dewsbury were also awarded to the Go-Ahead Group, one contract in Huddersfield was awarded to Stotts Coaches, and six contracts were awarded to the Go-Ahead Group, Hunters Coaches, and First West Yorkshire subsidiary Tetley's Coaches; five Tier C contracts, however, were left unawarded by WYCA as they deemed none of the bids for these contracts to be acceptable.

With only two SMEs winning contracts in this round of franchising, SquarePeg, of whom half of their commercial and contract services are set to be lost in the first rollout of franchises, criticised the process as "biased towards big groups" and launched a legal challenge against WYCA on 25 September. This resulted in the signing of Tier B and C contracts being delayed, followed by Tier C contracts then being withdrawn on 9 October due to "concerns identified with the evaluation process"; the awarding of four Tier B contracts serving Holmfirth, Slaithwaite, Hebden Bridge and Pudsey to Tower Transit, Stotts Coaches, Transdev Blazefield and the Go-Ahead Group, all worth £24 million, were also suspended on 21 October due to the legal challenge by SquarePeg.

=== Depots and bus stations ===
The new Heckmondwike bus station, featuring Weaver Network logos, in September 2026

The ownership of bus depots within West Yorkshire is planned to be handed over by commercial operators to the Combined Authority, with options for compulsory purchase orders available if negotiations between an operator and the Combined Authority do not result in ownership being transferred.

Approval was granted by the Combined Authority to acquire Heckmondwike bus station on a long-term lease from Kirklees Council in March 2026. Investments funded by the Combined Authority will include additional bus stops, indoor seating, solar panels and accessible facilities.

=== Vehicles ===
Weaver Network AccessBus-branded Mellor Strata minibus in Bradford in October 2026

Weaver Network buses are to be painted in a green livery with prominent fleetnames and graphics. The Weaver Network name and branding, announced by Tracy Brabin on 12 May 2025, was chosen as a reference to West Yorkshire's cultural and textile industry heritage with input from local Poet Laureate Simon Armitage, and is set to be gradually rolled out to replace the West Yorkshire Metro brand on buses, bus stops and stations. As of July 2025, the Combined Authority has declined to declare how much money is to be allocated to the Weaver Network rollout.

£39 million of funding for an investment into zero-emissions buses was approved by the Combined Authority in October 2025. It is estimated that the total cost of investing in new fleet vehicles for the first round of Weaver Network franchising will be £100 million, with 576 battery-electric and diesel buses planned to be purchased. The first Weaver Network-branded buses, 33 Mellor Strata bodied Mercedes-Benz Sprinter minibuses, began entering service on the door-to-door AccessBus network from October 2026, while the first of 193 Wright StreetDeck Electroliner double-decker buses were completed for delivery to WYCA that same month.

== See also ==
- Bee Network – the Weaver Network's equivalent in Greater Manchester
- Metro (Liverpool City Region) – the Weaver Network's equivalent in the Liverpool City Region
