= Mark Burns-Williamson =

British politician (born 1964)

Mark Burns-Williamson OBE
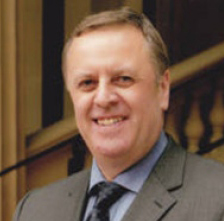

West Yorkshire Police and Crime Commissioner
- In office 22 November 2012 – 9 May 2021
- Preceded by: Office established
- Succeeded by: Tracy Brabin (Mayor of West Yorkshire); Alison Lowe (Deputy Mayor of West Yorkshire for Policing and Crime)

Chair of the West Yorkshire Police Authority
- In office June 2003 – October 2012

Chair of the Association of Police Authorities
- In office October 2011 – October 2012

Personal details
- Born: January 1964 (age 62) Castleford, England
- Party: Labour
- Education: Bradford University

Mark Burns-Williamson,OBE (born January 1964) is a British Labour Party politician who served as the West Yorkshire Police and Crime Commissioner from 2012 to 2021. He was the chair of the West Yorkshire Police Authority from 2003 to 2012. He was also the Wakefield District Councillor for Castleford Central and Glasshoughton Ward from 1998 to 2012.

== Early life ==
Burns-Williamson was born in 1964 in Castleford, Yorkshire, England. His employment has spanned over 20 years in public and private sector organisations, including West Yorkshire County Council, Citizens Advice Bureaux, CableTel Ltd, The Rugby Football League (RFL) and Halifax Plc. He is also a graduate of Bradford University (History/Politics Bsc Joint Hons), president of Glasshoughton Cricket Club, an ex rugby player and a lifelong rugby supporter.

== Political career ==
Burns-Williamson was elected to represent the ward of Castleford Central and Glasshoughton when he successfully contested the 1998 Wakefield Council elections, in West Yorkshire. Following this, he became a member of West Yorkshire Police Authority in 1999 and chair of the authority in June 2003. After joining the board of the Association of Police Authorities in 2003, he was made the board's deputy chair in 2009 and in October 2011 he was elected chair of the Association of Police Authorities.

Burns-Williamson was appointed an OBE for services to the Community and Policing in the 2012 Honours List.

== Police & Crime Commissioner for West Yorkshire ==
In June 2012, Burns-Williamson announced his intention to stand as a candidate in the 2012 England and Wales Police and Crime Commissioner elections for the West Yorkshire Police area. In October 2012, he stood down as the chair of the West Yorkshire Police Authority in order to continue his candidacy for PCC. In the November election, he was elected after the second round of counting.

In 2015 as the chair of the National Police Aviation Service (NPAS) he decided to replace helicopters with four Vulcanair P68 aircraft costing £2.5million each. When these aircraft entered service in January 2020 they were found to be unfit for purpose as they were not agile enough for urban pursuit and could not hover.

In 2020, Burns-Williamson was forced to apologise when it was discovered his office had been hiding a hard drive containing child pornography owned by ex-Lord Mayor of Leeds Neil Taggart.

== Election results ==
West Yorkshire Police and Crime Commissioner election, 2016
Party	Candidate	1st round		2nd round			1st round votesTransfer votes, 2nd round
Party	Candidate	Total	Of round	Transfers	Total	Of round	1st round votesTransfer votes, 2nd round
Labour	Mark Burns-Williamson	260,271	49.67%	35,543	295,814	66.3%	
Conservative	Allan Doherty	119,338	22.78%	30,788	150,126	33.7%	
UKIP	Peter Corkindale	74,748	14.27%				
Liberal Democrats	Barry Golton	48,963	9.34%				
English Democrat	Therese Muchewicz	20,656	3.94%				
Turnout		523,976	33.16%				
Rejected ballots							
Total votes							
Registered electors							
Labour hold							

West Yorkshire Police and Crime Commissioner election, 2012
Party	Candidate	1st round		2nd round			1st round votesTransfer votes, 2nd round
Party	Candidate	Total	Of round	Transfers	Total	Of round	1st round votesTransfer votes, 2nd round
Labour	Mark Burns-Williamson	102,817	47.88%	11,919	114,736	61.5%	
Independent	Cedric Christie	49,299	22.96%	22,577	71,876	38.5%	
Conservative	Geraldine Carter	45,365	21.13%				
Liberal Democrats	Andrew Marchington	17,247	8.03%				
Turnout		214,728	13.34%				
Rejected ballots		8,277	3.71%				
Total votes		223,005	13.85				
Registered electors		1,609,615					
Labour win							

2012 Wakefield Metropolitan District Council election Castleford Central and Glasshoughton
Party	Candidate	Votes	%	±%
Labour	Mark Burns-Williamson	2,306	76.3	+2.1
UKIP	Alison Bullivant	482	15.9	+2.5
Conservative	Eamonn Mullins	235	7.8	−4.2
Majority		1,824	60.3	−0.5
Turnout		3,023	24.8	
Labour hold		Swing		

2008 Wakefield Metropolitan District Council election Castleford Central and Glasshoughton
Party	Candidate	Votes	%	±%
Labour	Mark Burns-Williamson	1,775	54.1	−9.3
BNP	Rita Robinson	854	26.1	+3.4
Conservative	Eamonn Mullins	649	19.8	+6.0
Majority		921	28.0	−12.7
Turnout		3,278		
Labour hold		Swing		

2004 Wakefield Metropolitan District Council election Castleford Central and Glasshoughton
Party	Candidate	Votes	%	±%
Labour	Mark Burns-Williamson	2,797		
Labour	Anthony Wallis	2,692		
Labour	Denise Jeffery	2,286		
BNP	Rita Robinson	948		
Conservative	Stanley Hick	507		
Conservative	Val Moorey	484		
Conservative	Joan Revitt	483		
Turnout		10,197	36.7	
