= 2024 West Yorkshire mayoral election =

UK local election

- 2 May 2024
- Turnout: 32.71% ▼0.4pp
	First party	Second party	Third party
Candidate	Tracy Brabin	Arnold Craven	Andrew Cooper
Party	Labour Co-op	Conservative	Green
Popular vote	275,430	82,757	66,648
Percentage	50.4%	15.1%	12.2%
Swing	▲7.4pp	▼13.8pp	▲3.0pp
	Fourth party	Fifth party	Sixth party
Candidate	Bob Buxton	Richard Tilt	Stewart Golton
Party	Yorkshire	Independent	Liberal Democrats
Popular vote	47,937	46,443	27,501
Percentage	8.8%	8.5%	5.0%
Swing	▼0.9pp	New	▲0.1pp
Mayor before election
Tracy Brabin
Labour Co-op
Elected Mayor
Tracy Brabin
Labour Co-op

The 2024 West Yorkshire mayoral election was held on 2 May 2024 to elect the mayor of West Yorkshire alongside the 2024 United Kingdom local elections. Tracy Brabin of the Labour Party was re-elected with 275,430 votes.

== Background ==
The Mayor of West Yorkshire is the directly elected leader of the West Yorkshire Combined Authority. The mayoralty handles the £38 million-per-year investment coming from the central government for 30 years from 2021. The mayor has control over regional transport (including working toward creating a regional mass transit system), housing, land (with responsibility for creating a city region spatial plan) and adult skills. The role includes the responsibilities of the police and crime commissioner for West Yorkshire, similar to the Mayor of London and the Mayor of Greater Manchester.

The first election for the office was held in 2021, which Labour's Tracy Brabin won, winning with 59.8% of the vote to the 40.2% achieved by the second-placed candidate, Conservative Matthew Robinson.

== Electoral system ==
Unlike the previous election, which used a supplementary vote system, this election was the first to use the first-past-the-post voting system to elect the mayor as a result of the changes made by the Elections Act 2022. Voters were able to vote for a single candidate, and the candidate receiving the most votes was elected mayor.

== Candidates ==
- Tracy Brabin (Labour Co-op) – incumbent Mayor
- Bob Buxton (Yorkshire Party)
- Andrew Cooper (Green Party)
- Arnold Craven (Conservative)
- Stewart Golton (Liberal Democrat)
- Jonathan Tilt (Independent)

== Opinion polling ==
The poll conducted by Censuswide was unweighted, and included 16–17 year olds.

Dates conducted	Pollster	Client	Sample size	Lab	Con	Yorks	Green	Lib Dems	Reform	Others	Lead
2 May 2024	2024 election		–	50.4%	15.1%	8.8%	12.2%	5%	–	8.5%	35.4
9–19 February 2024	Censuswide	Yasper	1,001	52%	15%	8%	10%	8%	9%	–	37
6 May 2021	2021 election		–	43.1%	29.1%	9.7%	9.2%	5.0%	2.5%	1.5%	14.0

== Result ==
Result by district

2024 West Yorkshire mayoral election
Party	Candidate	Votes	%	±%
Labour Co-op	Tracy Brabin	275,430	50.4	+7.4
Conservative	Arnold Craven	82,757	15.1	−13.8
Green	Andrew Cooper	66,648	12.2	+3.0
Yorkshire	Bob Buxton	47,937	8.8	−0.9
Independent	Richard Tilt	46,443	8.5	New
Liberal Democrats	Stewart Golton	27,501	5.0	+0.1
Majority		192,673	35.2	+21.3
Turnout		546,716	32.7	−0.4
Labour Co-op hold		Swing	+10.6	

2024 West Yorkshire mayoral election
Districts	Tracy Brabin Lab		Arnold Craven Con		Andrew Cooper Green		Bob Buxton Yorkshire		Richard Tilt Independent		Stewart Golton Lib Dems		Total valid votes
Districts	#	%	#	%	#	%	#	%	#	%	#	%	#
Bradford	55,878	44.73%	19,206	15.38%	14,394	11.52%	9,791	7.84%	19,889	15.92%	5,758	4.61%	124,916
Calderdale	27,228	53.08%	8,641	16.85%	6,070	11.83%	4,155	8.10%	3,205	6.25%	1,995	3.89%	51,294
Kirklees	47,897	43.67%	17,690	16.13%	19,296	17.59%	7,944	7.24%	12,138	11.07%	4,713	4.30%	109,678
Leeds	107,011	54.83%	26,563	13.61%	22,097	11.32%	19,062	9.77%	7,479	3.83%	12,971	6.65%	195,183
Wakefield	37,416	57.00%	10,657	16.23%	4,791	7.30%	6,985	10.64%	3,732	5.69%	2,064	3.14%	65,645
Totals	275,430	50.38%	82,757	15.14%	66,648	12.19%	47,937	8.77%	46,443	8.49%	27,501	5.03%	546,716
