= Heckmondwike bus station =

Bus station in Heckmondwike, West Yorkshire, England

Heckmondwike
- Heckmondwike bus station shortly after opening in September 2026

General information
- Coordinates: 53°42′28.3″N 1°40′31.97″W
- System: Bus station
- Operator: Metro
- Bus stands: 4

History
- Opened: 25 April 2015
Location

Heckmondwike bus station (also known as Heckmondwike Hub) is a bus station in Heckmondwike, England.

== History ==
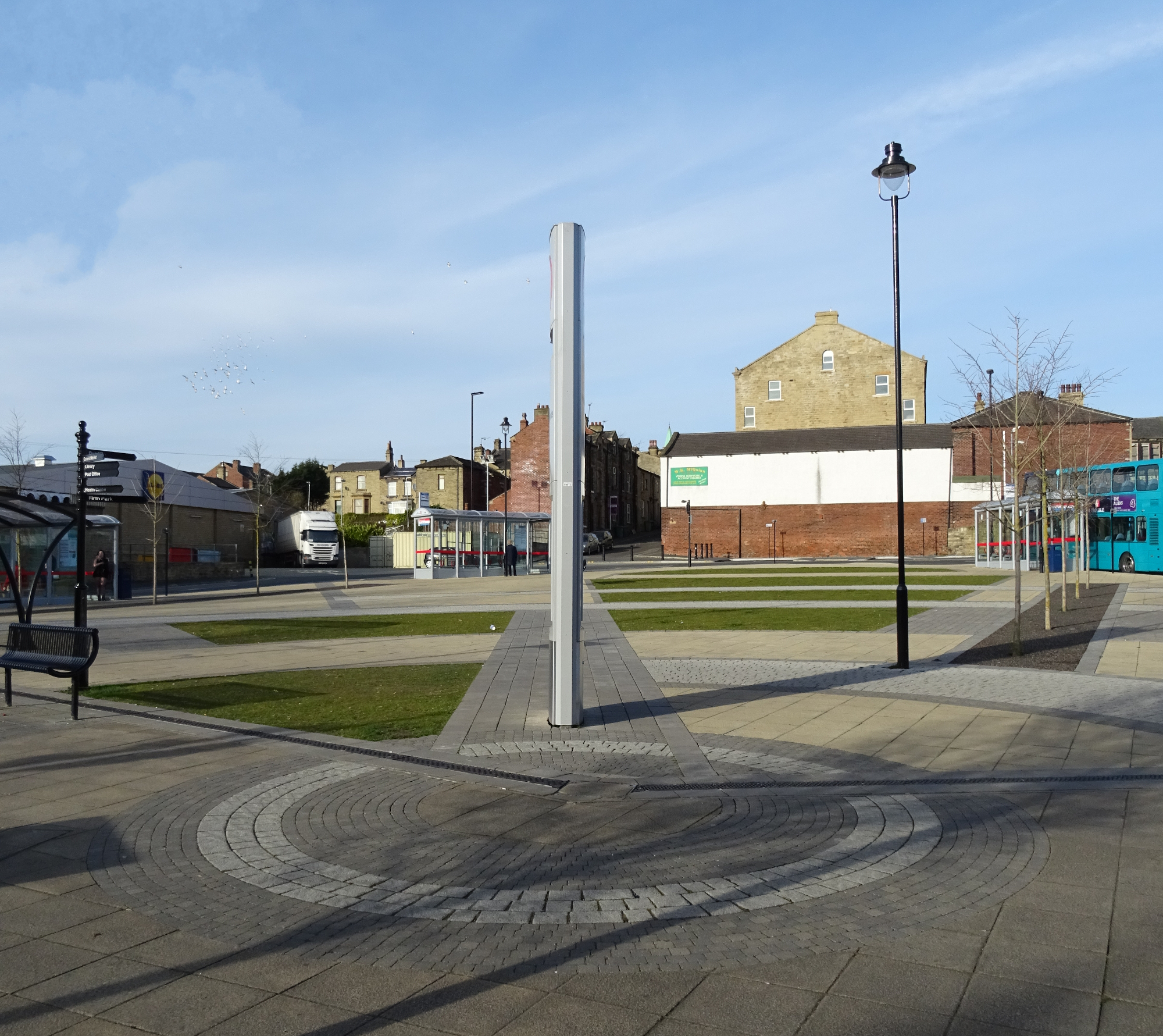
The former Heckmondwike Hub in March 2026

Plans to build a bus station in Heckmondwike were first considered in 2008, however, the project was delayed due to owners refusing to vacate offices on the proposed site, and the subsequent recession and budget cuts. Revised plans were approved by the council in April 2014. Work on the bus station finally began in October 2014, on a site that had previously been vacant for some time. The bus station opened on 25 April 2015.

=== Redevelopment ===
Plans to improve the bus station were announced in August 2020. The work will include adding two extra bus departure stands, baby changing facilities, an accessible toilet and a fully enclosed, indoor waiting facility. Construction began in June 2024, with the project due to take a year to complete.

The bus station will be the first to operate as part of West Yorkshire's "Weaver Network" of bus services.

== Facilities ==
The bus station has four stands, live departure information, sheltered bicycle parking, and covered waiting areas.
