= 2012 Wakefield Metropolitan District Council election =

2012 UK local government election

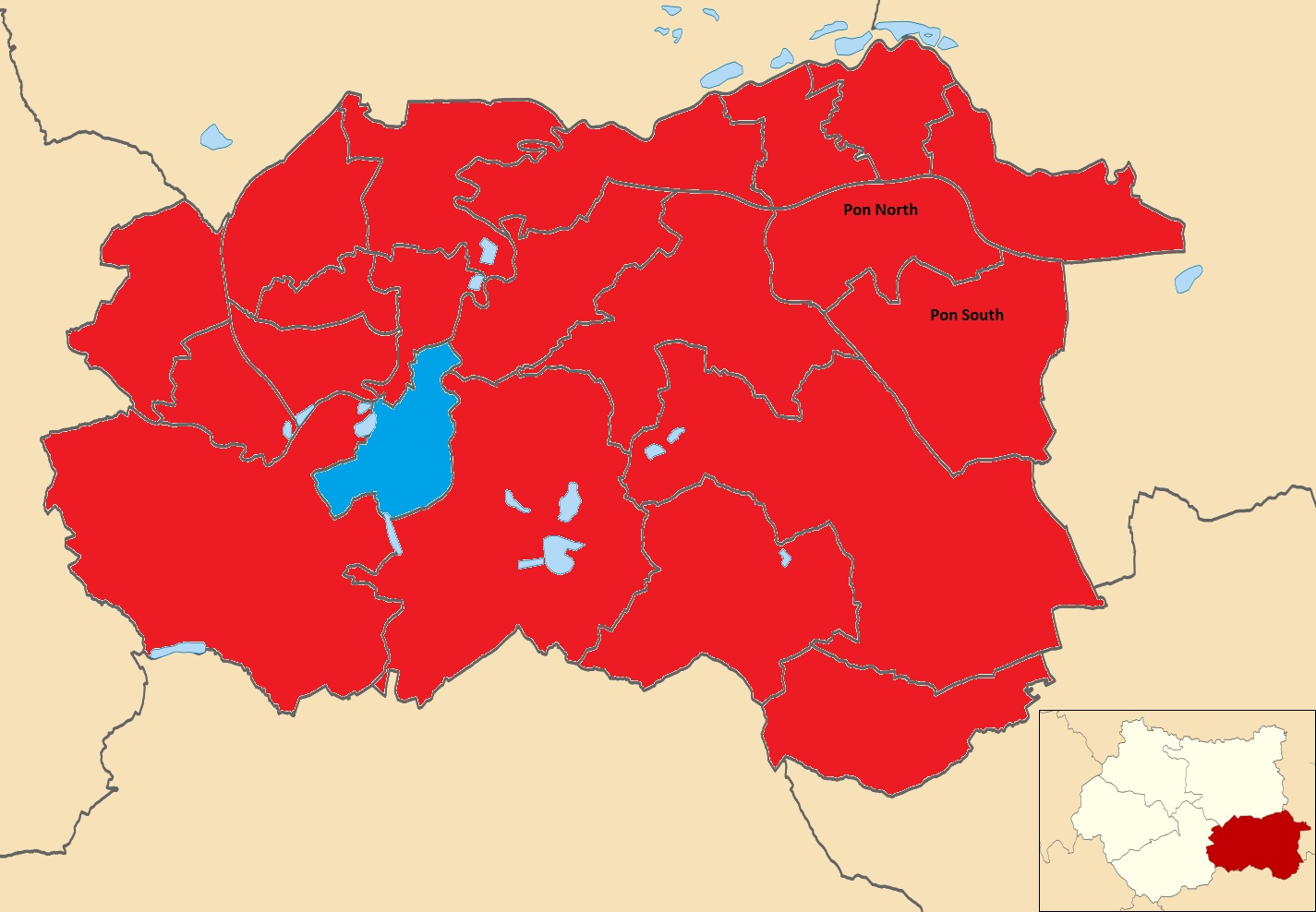
2012 local election results in Wakefield

The 2012 Wakefield Metropolitan District Council election was held on 3 May 2012 to elect members of Wakefield Metropolitan District Council in West Yorkshire, England. One third of the council was up for election.

== Council make-up ==
The make up of the council after the election was:

Party political make-up of Wakefield Council
Party	Seats			Council make-up (2012)
Party	2010	2011	2012	Council make-up (2012)
Labour	33	40	52	
Conservative	24	20	11	
Independent	5	3	0	
Lib Dems	1	0	0	

== Election result ==
Wakefield local election result 2012
Party	Seats	Gains	Losses	Net gain/loss	Seats %	Votes %	Votes	+/−
Labour	20	12	0	+12	95	56.2	41,147	+0.4
Conservative	1	0	9	-9	5	23.6	17,251	-6.3
UKIP	0	0	0	0	0	7.9	5,804	+4.8
Independent	0	0	3	-3	0	6.5	4,746	+3
Liberal Democrats	0	0	0	0	0	3.3	2,424	-1.7
Green	0	0	0	0	0	1.1	801	+0.2
English Democrat	0	0	0	0	0	0.8	594	+0.8
TUSC	0	0	0	0	0	0.1	76	-0.2

- +/- compared with Wakefield Council election 2011.

== Ward results ==
=== Ackworth, North Elmsall and Upton ward ===
Ackworth, North Elmsall and Upton
Party	Candidate	Votes	%	±%
Labour	Martyn Ward	2,128	62.4	+10.2
Conservative	Don Marshall	1,282	37.6	+3
Majority		846	24.8	+7.1
Turnout		3,410	26.9	−10.6
Labour gain from Conservative		Swing		

=== Airedale and Ferry Fryston ward ===
Airedale and Ferry Fryston
Party	Candidate	Votes	%	±%
Labour	Les Shaw	1,977	73.3	−6.8
UKIP	Arnie Craven	556	20.4	+20.4
Conservative	Mellisa Wan Omer	171	6.3	−12.9
Majority		1,441	52.9	−8
Turnout		2,724	23.5	−4.7
Labour hold		Swing		

=== Altofts and Whitwood ward ===
Altofts and Whitwood
Party	Candidate	Votes	%	±%
Labour	Peter Box	2,009	61.6	−2.5
UKIP	David Armitage	783	24	+24
Conservative	Steven Beeton	470	14.4	−10.7
Majority		1,226	37.6	−1.5
Turnout		3,262	25.8	−6.4
Labour hold		Swing		

=== Castleford Central and Glasshoughton ward ===
Castleford Central and Glasshoughton
Party	Candidate	Votes	%	±%
Labour	Mark Burns-Williamson	2,306	76.3	+2.1
UKIP	Alison Bullivant	482	15.9	+2.5
Conservative	Eamonn Mullins	235	7.8	−4.2
Majority		1,824	60.3	−0.5
Turnout		3,023	24.8	
Labour hold		Swing		

=== Crofton, Ryhill and Walton ward ===
Crofton, Ryhill and Walton
Party	Candidate	Votes	%	±%
Labour	Faith Hepptinstall	2,582	67.3	+6.1
Conservative	Allan Couch	1,253	32.7	+2.7
Majority		1,329	34.7	+3.5
Turnout		3,835	31.6	−8.1
Labour gain from Conservative		Swing		

=== Featherstone ward ===
Featherstone
Party	Candidate	Votes	%	±%
Labour	June Cliffe	2,649	83.7	+21.4
Conservative	Charles Scholes	516	16.3	+4.4
Majority		2,133	67.4	+30.3
Turnout		3,165	34.8	−9.6
Labour hold		Swing		

=== Hemsworth ward ===
Hemsworth
Party	Candidate	Votes	%	±%
Labour	Shaun Hodson	1,779	57.5	−2
Independent	Jim Kenyon	1,075	34.8	+7.2
Conservative	Philip Davies	238	7.7	−4.3
Majority		704	22.8	−9.1
Turnout		3,092	25.7	−7.2
Labour gain from Independent		Swing		

=== Horbury and South Ossett ward ===
Horbury and South Ossett
Party	Candidate	Votes	%	±%
Labour	Jack Hemingway	1,660	40.5	−8.2
Conservative	Richard Wakefield	934	22.8	−18.2
Independent	Graham Jesty	732	17.9	+17.9
UKIP	Anthony Lumb	429	10.5	+10.5
Liberal Democrats	Mark Goodair	340	8.3	−1.2
Majority		726	17.7	+10
Turnout		4,095	33.9	−7.5
Labour gain from Independent		Swing		

=== Knottingley ward ===
Knottingley
Party	Candidate	Votes	%	±%
Labour	Graham Stokes	1,788	69.7	+12.2
UKIP	Clinton Rhodes	494	19.3	+8.6
Conservative	Jon Wadey	282	11	−4.7
Majority		1,294	50.5	+8.7
Turnout		2,564	23.8	−5.7
Labour hold		Swing		

=== Normanton ward ===
Normanton
Party	Candidate	Votes	%	±%
Labour	Alan Wassell	1,775	62.9	−1
UKIP	Bryan Barkley	712	25.2	+7.9
Conservative	Emma-Jane Lisle	337	11.9	−6.4
Majority		1,063	37.6	−8
Turnout		2,824	22.3	−6.2
Labour hold		Swing		

=== Ossett ward ===
Ossett
Party	Candidate	Votes	%	±%
Labour	Tony Richardson	1,991	49.2	+8.9
Conservative	Terry Brown	1,453	35.9	−7.2
Liberal Democrats	David Smith	606	15	−0.8
Majority		538	13.3	
Turnout		4,050	31.9	−7.8
Labour gain from Conservative		Swing		

=== Pontefract North ward ===
Pontefract North
Party	Candidate	Votes	%	±%
Labour	Paula Sherriff	1,649	47.9	−11.9
Independent	Jack Kershaw	769	22.3	+22.3
Conservative	Hannah Crowther	481	14	−9.6
UKIP	Nathan Garbutt	368	10.7	0
Green	Rennie Smith	103	3.0	−2.4
TUSC	Daniel Dearden	76	2.2	+2.2
Majority		880	25.5	−10.6
Turnout		3,446	28.1	−3.1
Labour gain from Conservative		Swing		

=== Pontefract South ===
Pontefract South
Party	Candidate	Votes	%	±%
Labour	Celia Loughran	2,222	50.4	−3.1
Conservative	Mark Crowther	1,617	36.7	−9.1
UKIP	Terence Edward Uttley	446	10.1	+10.1
Liberal Democrats	Doug Dale	122	2.8	−10.1
Majority		605	13.7	−6
Turnout		4,407	36.6	−5.9
Labour gain from Conservative		Swing		

=== South Elmsall and South Kirkby ward ===
South Elmsall and South Kirkby
Party	Candidate	Votes	%	±%
Labour	Michelle Collins	2,071	56.1	−21.5
Independent	Wilf Benson	1,425	38.6	+38.6
Conservative	Christian IAnson	197	5.3	−6.8
Majority		646	17.5	−48
Turnout		3,693	27.4	
Labour gain from Independent		Swing		

=== Stanley and Outwood East ward ===
Stanley and Outwood East
Party	Candidate	Votes	%	±%
Labour	Matthew Morley	2,135	61.4	+6.1
Conservative	James Kildea	971	27.9	−8.1
Liberal Democrats	Margaret Dodd	370	10.6	+2.6
Majority		1,164	33.5	+14.2
Turnout		3,476	28.4	−8.7
Labour gain from Conservative		Swing		

=== Wakefield East ward ===
Wakefield East
Party	Candidate	Votes	%	±%
Labour	Ros Lund	1,741	50.9	+13.5
Independent	Choudry Ikram	659	19.3	+19.3
Conservative	Anthony Bracewell	596	17.4	−2.4
TUSC	Michael Griffiths	327	9.9	+0.9
Independent	Safia Ilyas	86	2.5	+2.5
Majority		1,082	31.6 43.2	−11.6
Turnout		3,419	28.6 33.6	−5
Labour hold		Swing		

=== Wakefield North ward ===
Wakefield North
Party	Candidate	Votes	%	±%
Labour	Elizabeth Rhodes	1,901	61.0	+10.1
UKIP	Keith Wells	594	19.1	+8.8
Conservative	Dianne Presha	451	14.5	−10.5
Liberal Democrats	Rob Bell	170	5.5	−1.6
Majority		1,307	41.9	−9.7
Turnout		3,116	27.6	−5.2
Labour hold		Swing		

=== Wakefield Rural ward ===
Wakefield Rural
Party	Candidate	Votes	%	±%
Labour	Lawrence Kirkpatrick	2,003	43.5	+0.9
Conservative	Tom Fletcher	1,778	38.6	−5.4
Green	Miriam Hawkins	472	10.2	+2.5
Liberal Democrats	Dennis Cronin	354	7.7	+2.7
Majority		225	4.9	+6.3
Turnout		4,607	34	−6.3
Labour gain from Conservative		Swing		

=== Wakefield South ward ===
Wakefield South
Party	Candidate	Votes	%	±%
Conservative	David Hopkins	1,851	47.8	−6.9
Labour	Javed Iqbal	1,562	40.3	+5.7
Liberal Democrats	Stephen Nuthall	462	11.9	+1.8
Majority		289	7.5	−12.6
Turnout		3,875	36.1	−7.3
Conservative hold		Swing		

=== Wakefield West ward ===
Wakefield West
Party	Candidate	Votes	%	±%
Labour	Hilary Mitchell	1,456	43.1	+4.2
Conservative	Philip Booth	1,101	32.6	−7.5
English Democrat	Norman Tate	594	17.6	+17.6
Green	Brian Else	226	6.7	+1.4
Majority		355	10.5	
Turnout		3,377	29.5	−5
Labour gain from Conservative		Swing		

=== Wrenthorpe and Outwood West ward ===
Wrenthorpe and Outwood West
Party	Candidate	Votes	%	±%
Labour	Martyn Johnson	1,743	46.9	+2.3
Conservative	Anne-Marie Glover	1,037	27.9	−7.9
UKIP	David Dews	940	25.3	+11.9
Majority		706	19	+10.4
Turnout		3,720	31.8	−7.6
Labour gain from Conservative		Swing		
