= 2008 Wakefield Metropolitan District Council election =

2008 UK local government election

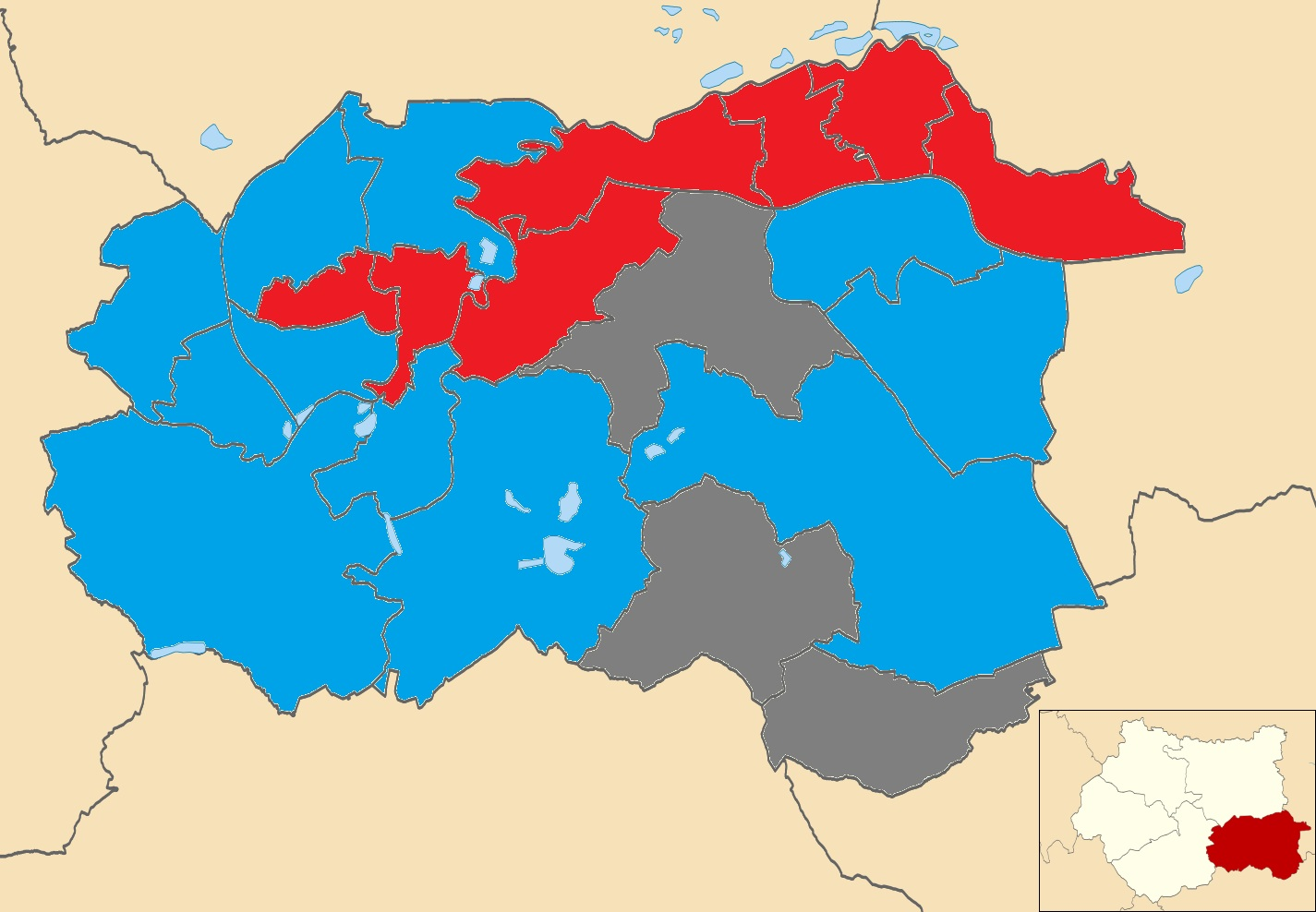
2008 local election results in Wakefield

The 2008 Wakefield Metropolitan District Council election took place on 1 May 2008 to elect members of Wakefield Metropolitan District Council in West Yorkshire, England. One third of the council was up for election and the Labour Party stayed in overall control of the council.

After the election, the composition of the council was:

- Labour 32
- Conservative 23
- Independent 6
- Liberal Democrat 2

== Background ==
Before the election there was disagreement among commentators about how safe Wakefield council was for Labour. The Daily Telegraph felt Labour would struggle to remain in control, but the Yorkshire Post believed it would remain safe for Labour.

Wakefield council joined with other councils from Yorkshire to run a television advertising campaign in an attempt to increase turnout.

== Election result ==
The results saw the Conservatives make 7 gains, all but one from Labour, and come up only one seat short of depriving Labour of their majority. Altogether Labour lost 8 seats including 2 to independents, while the Liberal Democrats lost their only seat that was being contested in Ossett to the Conservatives. Labour losses included the mayor, Allan Garbutt, and the cabinet member for children and young people, Trevor Izon, in Pontefract South. Overall turnout was 32.28%.

The Conservatives said that their victories were due both to the unpopularity of the national Labour government and due to the Labour council behaving in an arrogant way. The results were seen by the Conservatives as an encouraging sign of how they would perform at the next general election in the Wakefield constituencies. Meanwhile, Labour put their defeats down to national issues such as the abolition of the 10p rate of income tax and immigration.

Wakefield local election result 2008
Party	Seats	Gains	Losses	Net gain/loss	Seats %	Votes %	Votes	+/−
Conservative	11	7	0	+7	50.0	34.3	28,506	+4.3
Labour	8	0	8	-8	36.4	35.1	29,168	-3.9
Independent	3	2	0	+2	13.6	12.0	9,978	+1.8
Liberal Democrats	0	0	1	-1	0.0	8.8	7,319	-1.3
BNP	0	0	0	0	0.0	7.9	6,567	-0.4
Green	0	0	0	0	0.0	1.2	1,024	-0.2
Socialist	0	0	0	0	0.0	0.4	352	+0.1
UKIP	0	0	0	0	0.0	0.2	145	+0.0
British Voice	0	0	0	0	0.0	0.2	142	-0.2

== Ward results ==
Ackworth, North Elmsall and Upton
Party	Candidate	Votes	%	±%
Conservative	Richard Molloy	1,653	43.2	+13.5
Labour	Allan Garbutt	1,466	38.3	+1.1
Liberal Democrats	David Arthur	709	18.5	+4.1
Majority		187	4.9	
Turnout		3,828		
Conservative gain from Labour		Swing		

Airedale and Ferry Fryston
Party	Candidate	Votes	%	±%
Labour	Graham Phelps	1,401	46.7	−10.5
BNP	Stephen Rogerson	628	20.9	+2.2
Conservative	Mellisa Wan Omer	540	18.0	+5.3
Liberal Democrats	Paul Kirby	430	14.3	+2.9
Majority		773	25.8	−12.7
Turnout		2,999		
Labour hold		Swing		

Altofts and Whitwood
Party	Candidate	Votes	%	±%
Labour	Peter Box	1,316	37.4	−10.8
Liberal Democrats	Michael Burch	827	23.5	+4.4
Conservative	Gordon Tennant	793	22.5	+6.7
BNP	Dawn Byrom	585	16.6	−0.2
Majority		489	13.9	−15.2
Turnout		3,521		
Labour hold		Swing		

Castleford Central and Glasshoughton
Party	Candidate	Votes	%	±%
Labour	Mark Burns-Williamson	1,775	54.1	−9.3
BNP	Rita Robinson	854	26.1	+3.4
Conservative	Eamonn Mullins	649	19.8	+6.0
Majority		921	28.0	−12.7
Turnout		3,278		
Labour hold		Swing		

Crofton, Ryhill and Walton
Party	Candidate	Votes	%	±%
Conservative	Susan Lodge	1,783	40.4	+6.3
Labour	Albert Manifield	1,730	39.2	−6.9
BNP	Dean Crossland	902	20.4	+0.6
Majority		53	1.2	
Turnout		4,415		
Conservative gain from Labour		Swing		

Featherstone
Party	Candidate	Votes	%	±%
Independent	Kay Binnersley	1,974	45.8	+4.3
Labour	Dick Taylor	1,872	43.4	+4.9
Conservative	Michael Ledgard	464	10.8	+5.5
Majority		102	2.4	−0.6
Turnout		4,310		
Independent hold		Swing		

Hemsworth (2)
Party	Candidate	Votes	%	±%
Independent	Ian Womersley	1,695		
Labour	Glyn Lloyd	1,288		
Labour	Sandra Pickin	1,203		
Independent	John Evans	663		
Independent	Maurice Kent	503		
BNP	Jeanette Womack	400		
Conservative	Christian l'Anson	371		
Conservative	Rebecca Mullins	329		
Turnout		2,986		
Independent gain from Labour		Swing		
Labour hold		Swing		

Horbury and South Ossett
Party	Candidate	Votes	%	±%
Conservative	Graham Jesty	1,845	40.1	−2.6
Labour	Janet Holmes	1,657	36.0	−2.0
Independent	Susan Armitage	576	12.5	+12.5
Liberal Democrats	David Rowland	522	11.3	−8.0
Majority		188	4.1	−0.6
Turnout		4,600		
Conservative gain from Labour		Swing		

Knottingley
Party	Candidate	Votes	%	±%
Labour	Graham Stokes	1,417	56.7	−4.8
Conservative	Tom Dixon	1,081	43.3	+23.5
Majority		336	13.4	−28.3
Turnout		2,498		
Labour hold		Swing		

Normanton
Party	Candidate	Votes	%	±%
Labour	Barry Smith	1,037	31.8	−8.2
Conservative	Richard Wakefield	784	24.0	+12.4
Independent	Graeme Milner	699	21.4	−3.5
BNP	Adam Frazer	520	15.9	−0.1
Liberal Democrats	Jack Smith	221	6.8	−0.7
Majority		253	7.8	−7.3
Turnout		3,261		
Labour hold		Swing		

Ossett
Party	Candidate	Votes	%	±%
Conservative	Terry Brown	1,709	37.9	+12.4
Liberal Democrats	Mark Goodair	1,694	37.6	+1.1
Labour	David Watts	1,105	24.5	+0.2
Majority		15	0.3	
Turnout		4,508		
Conservative gain from Liberal Democrats		Swing		

Pontefract North
Party	Candidate	Votes	%	±%
Conservative	Philip Thomas	1,352	40.8	−6.4
Labour	Jack Kershaw	1,323	39.9	−12.9
Independent	Bob Evison	398	12.0	+12.0
Green	Rennie Smith	240	7.2	+7.2
Majority		29	0.9	
Turnout		3,313		
Conservative gain from Labour		Swing		

Pontefract South
Party	Candidate	Votes	%	±%
Conservative	Mark Crowther	2,340	48.8	−1.0
Labour	Trevor Izon	1,801	37.6	+0.2
Liberal Democrats	Chris Rush	650	13.6	+0.8
Majority		539	11.2	−1.2
Turnout		4,791		
Conservative gain from Labour		Swing		

South Elmsall and South Kirkby
Party	Candidate	Votes	%	±%
Independent	Wilf Benson	2,248	56.5	+1.5
Labour	Mollie Wright	1,342	33.7	−0.8
Conservative	Allan Crouch	389	9.8	−0.7
Majority		906	22.8	+2.3
Turnout		3,979		
Independent gain from Labour		Swing		

Stanley and Outwood East
Party	Candidate	Votes	%	±%
Conservative	Simon Wilson	1,392	36.9	+6.6
Labour	Charles Keith	1,112	29.5	−6.4
Liberal Democrats	David Evans	661	17.5	−0.7
BNP	Loraine Frazer	608	16.1	+0.5
Majority		280	7.4	
Turnout		3,773		
Conservative gain from Labour		Swing		

Wakefield East
Party	Candidate	Votes	%	±%
Labour	Ros Lund	1,478	44.8	−1.8
Conservative	Mark Pickard	1,022	31.0	+8.5
BNP	Robert Arnold	447	13.5	+1.9
Socialist	Michael Griffiths	352	10.7	+3.7
Majority		456	13.8	−10.3
Turnout		3,299		
Labour hold		Swing		

Wakefield North
Party	Candidate	Votes	%	±%
Labour	Elizabeth Rhodes	1,177	34.7	−1.9
Conservative	Graham Ridler	1,140	33.6	+5.8
Liberal Democrats	Andrew Tennant	468	13.8	−4.0
BNP	Graham Thewlis-Hardy	458	13.5	+1.7
UKIP	Keith Wells	145	4.3	+0.0
Majority		37	1.1	−7.7
Turnout		3,388		
Labour hold		Swing		

Wakefield Rural
Party	Candidate	Votes	%	±%
Conservative	John Colley	2,837	62.0	+9.6
Labour	Tony Richardson	1,108	24.2	−2.5
Green	Miriam Hawkins	628	13.7	−0.5
Majority		1,729	37.8	+12.1
Turnout		4,573		
Conservative hold		Swing		

Wakefield South
Party	Candidate	Votes	%	±%
Conservative	David Hopkins	1,725	40.0	−1.6
Independent	Norman Hazell	1,222	28.4	+8.3
Labour	Simon Young	672	15.6	−1.7
Liberal Democrats	Stephen Nuthall	369	8.6	+1.4
BNP	John Aveyard	321	7.4	+2.9
Majority		503	11.6	−9.9
Turnout		4,309		
Conservative hold		Swing		

Wakefield West
Party	Candidate	Votes	%	±%
Conservative	Mike Walker	2,479	60.2	+5.3
Labour	Matthew Morley	738	17.9	−3.2
BNP	Neville Poynton	348	8.5	+8.5
Liberal Democrats	Susan Morgan	252	6.1	−3.0
Green	Brian Else	156	3.8	−3.1
British Voice	Norman Tate	142	3.5	−4.6
Majority		1,741	42.3	+8.5
Turnout		4,115		
Conservative hold		Swing		

Wrenthorpe and Outwood West
Party	Candidate	Votes	%	±%
Conservative	Annemarie Glover	1,829	45.8	+5.9
Labour	Martyn Johnson	1,150	28.8	−6.8
Liberal Democrats	Margaret Dodd	516	12.9	+0.5
BNP	Grant Rowe	496	12.4	+0.2
Majority		679	17.0	+12.7
Turnout		3,991		
Conservative hold		Swing		
