= 2021 West Yorkshire mayoral election =

- 6 May 2021
- Turnout: 36.5%
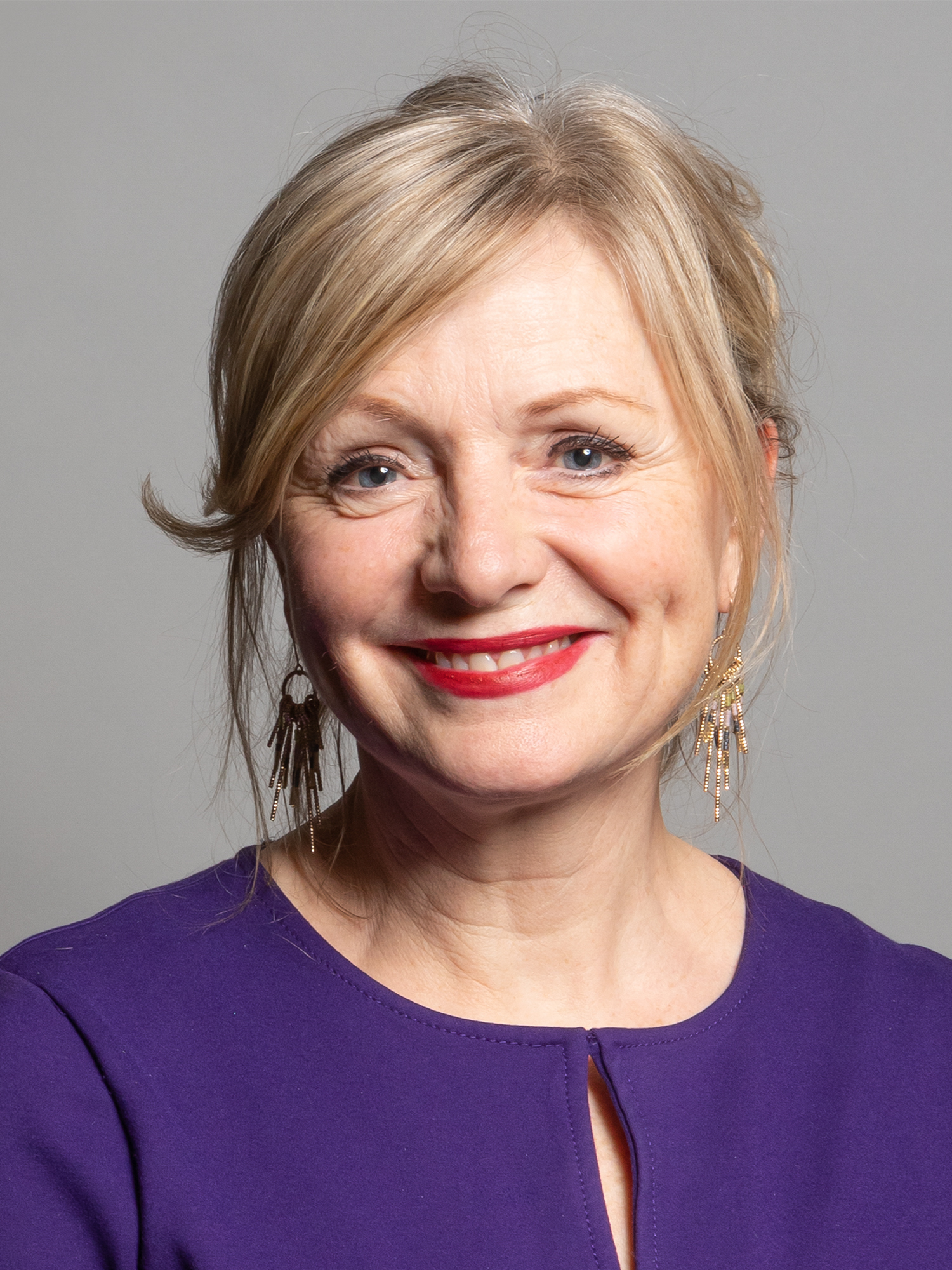
Candidate	Tracy Brabin	Matthew Robinson
Party	Labour Co-op	Conservative
1st Round vote	261,170	176,167
Percentage	43.1%	29.1%
2nd Round vote	310,923	209,137
Percentage	59.8%	40.2%
Candidate	Bob Buxton	Andrew Cooper
Party	Yorkshire	Green
1st Round vote	58,851	55,833
Percentage	9.7%	9.2%
2nd Round vote	Eliminated	Eliminated
Percentage	Eliminated	Eliminated
Mayor before election
Position established
Elected Mayor
Tracy Brabin
Labour Co-op

The inaugural West Yorkshire mayoral election was held on Thursday 6 May 2021 to elect the Mayor of West Yorkshire. It took place simultaneously on the same day as other local elections across the United Kingdom, including council elections in each of the five metropolitan boroughs of West Yorkshire.

It was conducted using the supplementary vote (SV) electoral system. The new mayor would chair and lead the West Yorkshire Combined Authority, and incorporate the previous responsibilities of the police and crime commissioner for West Yorkshire, with the latter being abolished.

The contest was the first election for a governing body for the West Yorkshire region since the last West Yorkshire County Council election in 1981, before the county council's abolition in 1986. An initial three-year term was granted for the inaugural mayor, with four-year terms thereafter.

== Background ==
The West Yorkshire Combined Authority (WYCA) was first proposed in 2012 as part of the City Deal for the Leeds City Region. It was negotiated between the coalition government, Leeds City Region Enterprise Partnership and the five West Yorkshire boroughs of Bradford, Calderdale, Kirklees, Leeds and Wakefield. The combined authority was established on 1 April 2014, following a public consultation and statutory approval on 31 March 2014. There was support from the five boroughs for a "One Yorkshire" proposal, which would have elected a mayor for the entire Yorkshire region. However it was rejected by the government in 2019.

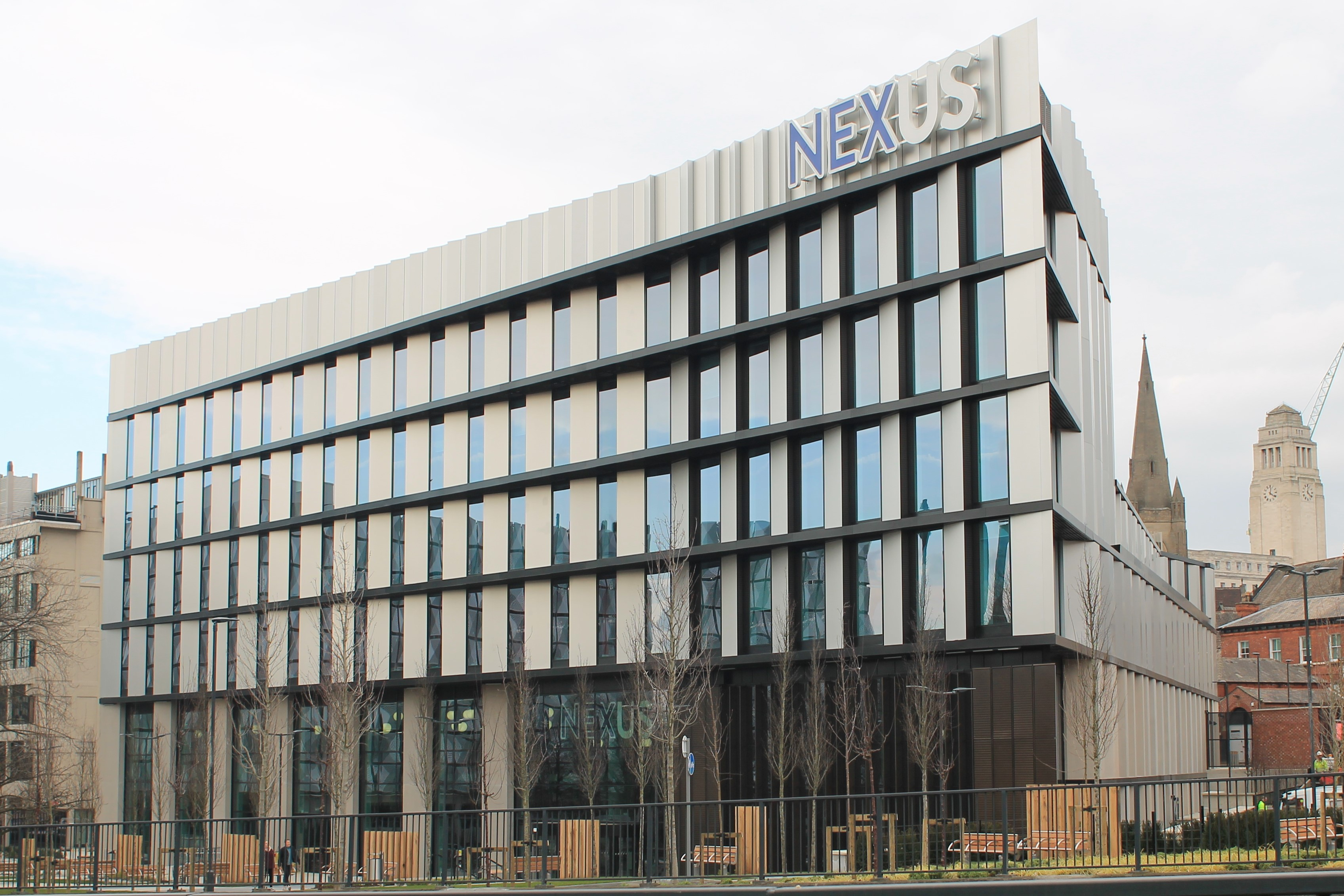
The Nexus building at the University of Leeds where the devolution deal was signed

The devolution deal was formally signed on 12 March 2020 in the Nexus building at the University of Leeds. After further negotiations, the Chancellor of the Exchequer Rishi Sunak announced in the March 2020 UK budget that the government and the West Yorkshire authorities had agreed a proposed West Yorkshire devolution deal.

The mayor's role includes handling of a £38 million a year investment from central government for 30 years. The mayor has control over regional transport (including creating a regional mass transit system), housing, land (with responsibility for creating a city region spatial plan) and adult skills. Though the role was initially planned to absorb the responsibilities of the West Yorkshire Police and Crime Commissioner – similar to the mayor of London and the mayor of Greater Manchester – in 2024, changes in January 2021 meant that the role was being incorporated into the Mayor's office for May 2021.

Prior to the election, the Labour Party had control of all five boroughs of the city-region. However, in the 2019 general election, Labour lost four seats in West Yorkshire to the Conservative Party.

== Results ==
West Yorkshire Mayoral Election 2021
Party	Candidate	1st round		2nd round			1st round votesTransfer votes, 2nd round
Party	Candidate	Total	Of round	Transfers	Total	Of round	1st round votesTransfer votes, 2nd round
Labour Co-op	Tracy Brabin	261,170	43.09%	49,753	310,923	59.81%	
Conservative	Matt Robinson	176,167	29.06%	32,970	209,137	40.21%	
Yorkshire	Bob Buxton	58,851	9.71%				
Green	Andrew Cooper	55,833	9.21%				
Liberal Democrats	Stewart Golton	30,162	4.98%				
Reform	Waj Ali	14,943	2.47%				
English Democrat	Thérèse Hirst	8,969	1.48%				
Majority					101,966	19.62%	
Turnout		606,135	36.52%				
Total votes		617,782					
Registered electors		1,691,429					

=== Results by local authority ===
==== Bradford ====
West Yorkshire Mayoral Election 2021, Bradford
Party	Candidate	1st round		2nd round			1st round votesTransfer votes, 2nd round
Party	Candidate	Total	Of round	Transfers	Total	Of round	1st round votesTransfer votes, 2nd round
Labour Co-op	Tracy Brabin	61,747	45.59%	10,583	72,330	62.52%	
Conservative	Matt Robinson	36,358	26.84%	7,000	43,358	37.48%	
Green	Andrew Cooper	11,317	8.36%				
Yorkshire	Bob Buxton	11,190	8.26%				
Liberal Democrats	Stewart Golton	6,026	4.45%				
Reform	Waj Ali	5,039	3.72%				
English Democrat	Thérèse Hirst	3,770	2.78%				

==== Calderdale ====
West Yorkshire Mayoral Election 2021, Calderdale
Party	Candidate	1st round		2nd round			1st round votesTransfer votes, 2nd round
Party	Candidate	Total	Of round	Transfers	Total	Of round	1st round votesTransfer votes, 2nd round
Labour Co-op	Tracy Brabin	24,699	41.20%	4,624	29,323	56.54%	
Conservative	Matt Robinson	18,990	31.67%	3,547	22,537	43.46%	
Yorkshire	Bob Buxton	6,156	10.27%				
Green	Andrew Cooper	5,189	8.65%				
Liberal Democrats	Stewart Golton	2,781	4.64%				
Reform	Waj Ali	1,278	2.13%				
English Democrat	Thérèse Hirst	862	1.44%				

==== Kirklees ====
West Yorkshire Mayoral Election 2021, Kirklees
Party	Candidate	1st round		2nd round			1st round votesTransfer votes, 2nd round
Party	Candidate	Total	Of round	Transfers	Total	Of round	1st round votesTransfer votes, 2nd round
Labour Co-op	Tracy Brabin	48,717	41.83%	9,038	57,755	57.81%	
Conservative	Matt Robinson	35,535	30.51%	6,608	42,143	42.19%	
Green	Andrew Cooper	13,973	12.00%				
Yorkshire	Bob Buxton	9,982	8.57%				
Liberal Democrats	Stewart Golton	4,430	3.80%				
Reform	Waj Ali	2,553	2.19%				
English Democrat	Thérèse Hirst	1,280	1.10%				

==== Leeds ====
West Yorkshire Mayoral Election 2021, Leeds
Party	Candidate	1st round		2nd round			1st round votesTransfer votes, 2nd round
Party	Candidate	Total	Of round	Transfers	Total	Of round	1st round votesTransfer votes, 2nd round
Labour Co-op	Tracy Brabin	92,312	42.83%	20,312	112,624	60.92%	
Conservative	Matt Robinson	60,669	28.15%	11,580	72,249	39.08%	
Yorkshire	Bob Buxton	22,141	10.27%				
Green	Andrew Cooper	20,705	9.61%				
Liberal Democrats	Stewart Golton	14,465	6.71%				
Reform	Waj Ali	3,143	1.46%				
English Democrat	Thérèse Hirst	2,075	0.96%				

==== Wakefield ====
West Yorkshire Mayoral Election 2021, Wakefield
Party	Candidate	1st round		2nd round			1st round votesTransfer votes, 2nd round
Party	Candidate	Total	Of round	Transfers	Total	Of round	1st round votesTransfer votes, 2nd round
Labour Co-op	Tracy Brabin	33,695	42.81%	5,196	38,891	57.41%	
Conservative	Matt Robinson	24,615	31.27%	4,235	28,850	42.59%	
Yorkshire	Bob Buxton	9,382	11.92%				
Green	Andrew Cooper	4,649	5.91%				
Reform	Waj Ali	2,930	3.72%				
Liberal Democrats	Stewart Golton	2,460	3.13%				
English Democrat	Thérèse Hirst	982	1.25%				

== Candidates ==
=== Conservative Party ===
Matthew Robinson was selected by party members as the Conservative Party's candidate on 20 February 2021. Robinson, a Leeds City Councillor for Harewood ward, had been the party's candidate for the cancelled 2021 West Yorkshire Police and Crime Commissioner election and prospective parliamentary candidate for Leeds East in 2017. He defeated Narinder Sekhon for the nomination, a barrister and parliamentary candidate for Bradford South in 2019.

It had previously been speculated that Ken Davy, businessman and the party's former candidate for Huddersfield in 2019, could potentially stand in the election. Baroness Sayeeda Warsi, peer and former co-chair of the Conservative Party, declined to stand.

=== Green Party ===
Andrew Cooper, the leader of the Green Party group on Kirklees Council and councillor for Newsome ward, was announced as the Green Party's mayoral candidate on 16 September 2020. Cooper was parliamentary candidate for Huddersfield in 2010, 2015, 2017 and 2019. Hawarun Hussain, a former Bradford Councillor for Shipley ward, was also confirmed as the party's candidate for deputy mayor.

During the final public round of selection process, Cooper received 58% of party members' votes, defeating Hussain in second place with 42% of the vote. Lyn Morton, the party's parliamentary candidate in 2019 for Hemsworth, was eliminated in the earlier selection process.

=== Labour Party ===
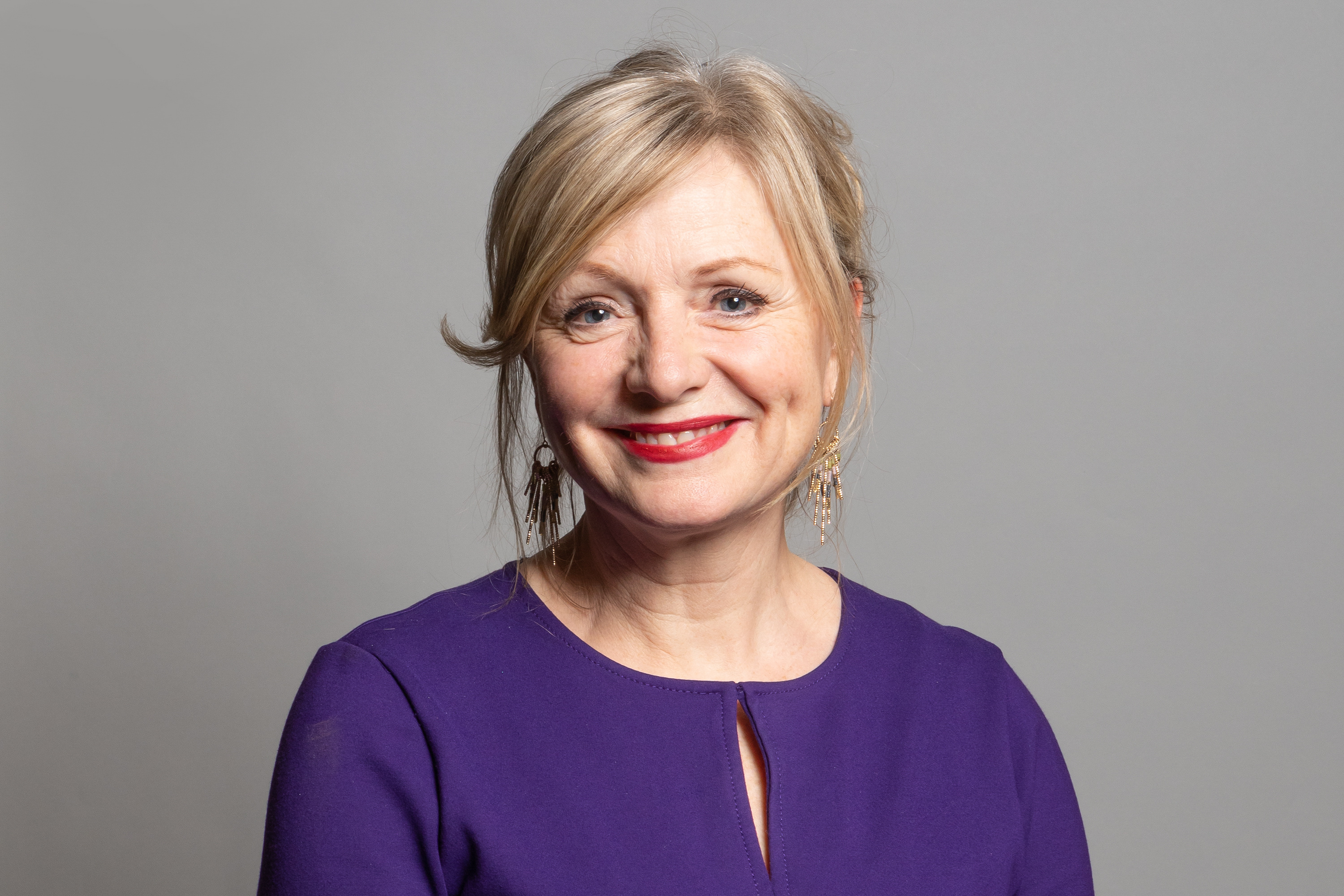
Tracy Brabin

Tracy Brabin, the former MP for Batley and Spen, a former actress and television writer, was announced as the Labour and Co-operative candidate on 11 December 2020 following a ballot of party members. Upon her selection, Brabin resigned as Shadow Minister for the Cultural Industries and would step down as an MP when elected. She defeated Susan Hinchcliffe, the chair of the West Yorkshire Combined Authority, the leader of Bradford Council and councillor for Windhill and Wrose ward, and Hugh Goulbourne, solicitor and the chair of the Huddersfield branch of the Co-operative Party.

Labour opened candidate nominations in October 2020, with a deadline for self-nomination on 14 October. To progress to the next interview stage, each candidate required a nomination from at least two Constituency Labour Parties or two affiliated groups by 8 November. A joint committee of the party's National Executive Committee and the Regional Executive Committee then selected a shortlist of Brabin, Goulbourne and Hinchcliffe to be voted on and selected in a ballot of party members.

Peter Judge, a former Calderdale Councillor, nominated himself but was not short-listed. Paula Sherriff, the former MP for Dewsbury, had announced her intention to stand as a candidate but later withdrew in March 2020 due to receiving treatment for breast cancer.

==== Endorsements ====
Candidate	Individuals	Organisations
Tracy Brabin	Fabian Hamilton, Labour MP; Rachael Maskell, Labour MP; Naz Shah, Labour MP; Alex Sobel, Labour MP; Jodie Whittaker, actor	ASLEF; Communication Workers Union; Co-operative Party; GMB; National Union of Mineworkers; TSSA; Unite the Union
Hugh Goulbourne	Sir John Harman, former Kirklees Council leader; Baroness Osamor, Labour peer	
Susan Hinchcliffe	John Grogan, a former Labour MP.; Imran Hussein, Labour MP; Holly Lynch, Labour MP; Keith Wakefield, a former leader of Leeds City Council	Community; Usdaw; UNISON

=== Liberal Democrats ===
Stewart Golton, the leader of the Liberal Democrat group on Leeds City Council, was announced as the Liberal Democrat candidate on 17 December 2020. Golton is a councillor for Rothwell ward and former parliamentary candidate for Elmet and Rothwell in 2010, 2015, 2017 and 2019.

=== Yorkshire Party ===
Bob Buxton, the leader of the Yorkshire Party, was announced as the party's candidate on 11 August 2020. Buxton is a Rawdon Parish Councillor and was the party's parliamentary candidate for Pudsey in 2017 and 2019.

=== Prior speculated candidates ===
There was prior speculation around additional individuals, who did not eventually stand:

- Michelle Dewberry, businessperson, media personality and parliamentary candidate for Hull West and Hessle in 2017 and 2019 to stand for the Reform UK party (formerly The Brexit Party)
- Bernard Hogan-Howe, peer and former head of the Metropolitan Police and Commissioner of Police of the Metropolis
- Anne Longfield, Children's Commissioner for England
- Roger Marsh, chair of the Leeds City Region Local Enterprise Partnership
