= Mayor of West Yorkshire =

Directly elected mayor in England

- Incumbent; Tracy Brabin since 10 May 2021
- West Yorkshire Combined Authority
- Style: Mayor
- Status: Strategic authority mayor
- Member of: West Yorkshire Combined Authority
- Residence: Wellington House, 40–50 Wellington Street, Leeds
- Nominator: Political parties or self-nomination
- Appointer: Electorate of West Yorkshire; by supplementary vote (2021); first-past-the-post voting (2024 onwards)
- Term length: 4 years, renewable
- Constituting instrument: Cities and Local Government Devolution Act 2016
- Precursor: Chair of the West Yorkshire Combined Authority
- Inaugural holder: Tracy Brabin
- Salary: £105,000
- Website: www.westyorks-ca.gov.uk

The mayor of West Yorkshire is a strategic authority mayor responsible for the metropolitan county of West Yorkshire in England. The mayor chairs and leads the West Yorkshire Combined Authority, and assumes the office and powers of the West Yorkshire Police and Crime Commissioner.

Based on the Cities and Local Government Devolution Act 2016, the West Yorkshire devolution deal was announced by the Chancellor of the Exchequer, Rishi Sunak, in the March 2020 budget. It was formally signed by the UK Government and the region's five metropolitan borough councils (Bradford, Calderdale, Kirklees, Leeds and Wakefield) and after a public consultation on the deal, it became law in January 2021. The deal is the biggest of its kind and transfers decisions about investment in transport, skills, housing and regeneration from Parliament to West Yorkshire. The mayoralty also incorporates the functions of the police and crime commissioner and is able to appoint a deputy mayor for policing and crime.

The first mayoral election took place on 6 May 2021. The inaugural mayor was elected by the supplementary vote (SV) system to an initial three-year term and the first elected mayor was Tracy Brabin, formerly Member of Parliament (MP) for Batley and Spen, who stood down as MP on being elected mayor. The second mayoral election took place in 2024, electing her to a further four-year term. Following the passing of the Elections Act 2022, future elections will instead be conducted using the first-past-the-post system.

== Background ==
The Local Government Act 2000 allowed all councils in England and Wales to consider a range of options as to how to amend or retain how they operate their executive functions, including the option for a local authority to be led by a directly elected mayor, instead of an elected councillor selected by their fellow councillors. The act also provided that a petition of more than 5% of the electorate of a council area could force that council to hold a referendum on whether to introduce a directly elected mayor. The salary for the position is £105,000 per annum, plus expenses.

=== Mayoral referendums for Bradford, Leeds and Wakefield ===
As pledged in the 2010 Conservative Party election manifesto, the Conservative-Liberal Democrat coalition government held a series of local referendums on 3 May 2012 asking whether each of the twelve largest cities in England by population should have a directly elected mayor to lead their council. The electorates of the Bradford, Leeds and Wakefield districts voted by 55.1%, 63.3% and 62.2% respectively against introducing an elected mayor for City of Bradford Metropolitan District Council, Leeds City Council and Wakefield Council respectively.

=== West Yorkshire Combined Authority ===
The West Yorkshire Combined Authority (WYCA) was first proposed in 2012 as part of the City Deal for the Leeds City Region. It was negotiated between the coalition government, Leeds City Region Enterprise Partnership and the five West Yorkshire boroughs of Bradford, Calderdale, Kirklees, Leeds and Wakefield. The combined authority was established on 1 April 2014, following a public consultation and statutory approval on 31 March 2014.

In June 2014, Chancellor of the Exchequer George Osborne proposed elected mayors specifically for the cities of northern England as part of his policy proposal to build a 'Northern Powerhouse'. He cited "a mis-match between the economic importance of the great northern cities and their political clout. Wales has its own parliament, and can pass its own laws. But as the Centre for Cities point out, the economies of Manchester and Leeds are each individually bigger than Wales. But they don't have a single leader who can speak for the whole area." He offered "serious devolution of powers and budgets for any city that wants to move to a new model of city government – and have an elected Mayor."

The Cities and Local Government Devolution Act 2016 legislated for the election of new mayors to combined authorities across England and Wales. As no deal had yet been agreed with West Yorkshire, it set out the legal framework for any future mayoralty with the devolution of some powers to West Yorkshire over education and training, economic development, housing and transport subject to the progression of future negotiations.

Discussions between the combined authority and HM Treasury continued, with the five Labour council leaders in West Yorkshire opposed to the Conservative government's preferred city region model favouring a 'Mayor of the Leeds City Region'. The model would have included the five West Yorkshire council districts as well as Barnsley, Craven, Harrogate, Selby and York.

The five constituent councils eventually formally supported a 'One Yorkshire' proposal to elect a mayor for the entire Yorkshire region. In 2018, the plan was submitted to the Secretary of State for Housing, Communities and Local Government, James Brokenshire, with the support of 18 of the 20 local councils across Yorkshire. In February 2019, the One Yorkshire proposal was rejected by Brokenshire as it did not meet the government's devolution criteria.

=== 2020 West Yorkshire devolution deal ===
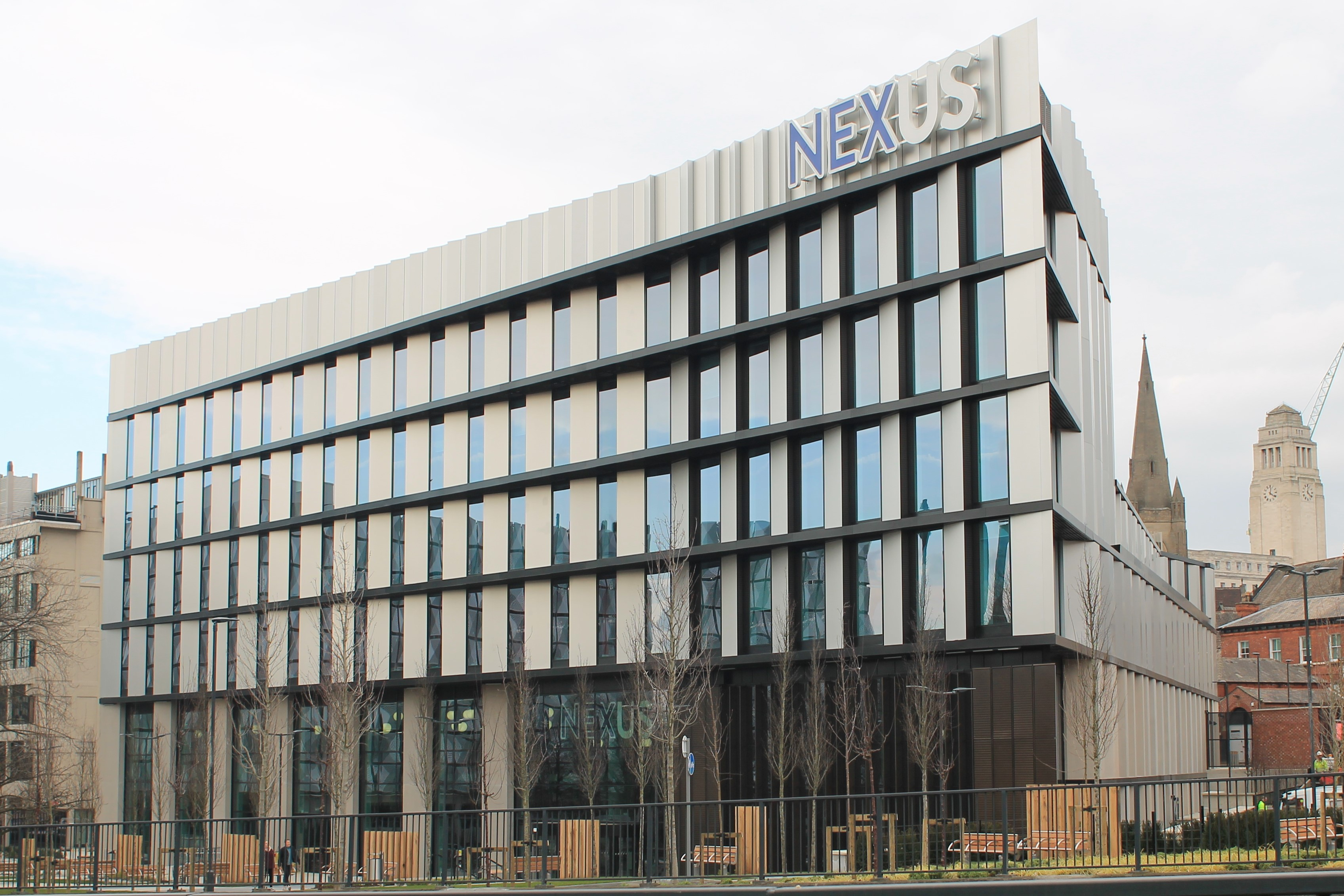
The Nexus building at the University of Leeds, where the devolution deal was signed

After further negotiations, it was announced in the March 2020 budget that the government and the West Yorkshire authorities had agreed a proposed West Yorkshire devolution deal.

The devolution deal was formally signed on 12 March 2020 in the Nexus building at the University of Leeds. The agreement was signed by Chancellor Rishi Sunak, Northern Powerhouse Minister Simon Clarke, the combined authority's chair and Bradford Council Leader Susan Hinchcliffe, and the four other constituent council leaders: Judith Blake (Leeds), Denise Jeffery (Wakefield), Shabir Pandor (Kirklees) and Tim Swift (Calderdale).

Its terms include the handling of £38 million-per-year investment from central government for 30 years. The mayor will have control over regional transport (including working toward creating a regional mass transit system), housing, land (with responsibility for creating a city region spatial plan) and adult skills. The role absorbs the responsibilities of the police and crime commissioner for West Yorkshire, similar to the mayor of London and the mayor of Greater Manchester.

A planned public consultation was undertaken in 2020 before the deal was finalised. 4,400 members of the public participated in the consultation, a majority support of those who participated supported the scheme. Opposition councillors across the councils, such as Conservaties, Liberal Democrats and Independents.

The first mayoral election was held on 6 May 2021.

== Powers and responsibilities ==
=== Policing and crime ===
The West Yorkshire Police and Crime Commissioner was an elected official tasked with setting out the way crime is tackled by West Yorkshire Police. The position, which replaced the West Yorkshire Police Authority, was created in November 2012, following an election held on 15 November 2012, and was held by Mark Burns-Williamson for its entirety from 2012 to 2021. It became defunct in May 2021, its powers and responsibility being transferred to the mayor of West Yorkshire as a part of the West Yorkshire Devolution deal as signed by Rishi Sunak, Simon Clarke and the five leaders of the constituent councils. As of the inaugural election of the mayor in 2021, the role is incorporated into the mayor's responsibilities, with the power to appoint a deputy mayor to support in this role.

Police and Crime Commissioner for West Yorkshire
Name	Term start	Term end
Mark Burns-Williamson	22 November 2012	9 May 2021
Deputy Mayor of West Yorkshire for Policing and Crime
Name	Term start	Term end
Alison Lowe	18 June 2021	

=== Intergovernmental relations ===
The mayor is a member of the Mayoral Council for England and the Council of the Nations and Regions.

== List of mayors ==
Name	Picture	Term of office		Elected	Political party
Tracy Brabin		10 May 2021	Incumbent	2021; 2024	Labour and Co-operative

== List of elections ==
- 2021 West Yorkshire mayoral election
- 2024 West Yorkshire mayoral election
