= Tracy Brabin =

British politician (born 1961)

Mayor Tracy Brabin
- Brabin in 2025

Mayor of West Yorkshire
- Incumbent
- Assumed office 10 May 2021
- Preceded by: Office established

Member of Parliament for Batley and Spen
- In office 20 October 2016 – 10 May 2021
- Preceded by: Jo Cox
- Succeeded by: Kim Leadbeater
Shadow portfolios
Shadow Secretary of State
2020	Digital, Culture, Media and Sport
Shadow Minister
2020	Cultural Industries
2017–2020	Early Years

Personal details
- Born: Tracy Lynn Brabin; 9 May 1961 (age 65) Batley, West Riding of Yorkshire, England
- Party: Labour Co-op
- Spouse: Richard Platt (div. 2024)
- Education: Loughborough University (BA); University of the Arts London (MA)
- Website: Official Website

Tracy Lynn Brabin (born 9 May 1961) is a British Labour Co-op politician and former actress who has been the strategic authority mayor for West Yorkshire since the office was established on 10 May 2021. She was the Member of Parliament (MP) for Batley and Spen from 2016 to 2021.

Born in Batley, Brabin was an actress and television writer prior to entering politics, appearing in several British soap operas including Coronation Street, Doctors, EastEnders, Casualty and Emmerdale. She was elected for Batley and Spen in an October 2016 by-election after the murder of previous incumbent Jo Cox.

She was appointed as Shadow Secretary of State for Digital, Culture, Media and Sport by Jeremy Corbyn in January 2020, succeeding former Deputy Labour Leader Tom Watson. In April 2020, new Labour Leader Keir Starmer removed Brabin from the shadow cabinet and appointed her Shadow Minister for Cultural Industries.

She resigned as an MP after winning the 2021 West Yorkshire mayoral election. Her resignation triggered a by-election, which Labour's Kim Leadbeater won. She is the first ever woman to serve as a metro-mayor.

She won a second term in the 2024 West Yorkshire mayoral election.

== Early life ==
Brabin was born in Batley in the West Riding of Yorkshire. Brabin stated she was born into poverty and that her family was at risk of homelessness until the local council offered them a two-bed council flat. She claimed that this experience is what motivated her to enter into politics in adulthood. She was educated at Heckmondwike Grammar School. She studied drama at Loughborough University and gained a Master of Arts degree in screenwriting from the London College of Communication of the University of the Arts London in 2001.

== Arts career ==
=== Television ===
Brabin started her career as a presenter on But First This! on Children's BBC in 1987.

Brabin played clumsy waitress Sandra opposite David Jason in A Bit of a Do, she played Doreen in a Hale and Pace comedy sketch titled 'Big Night Out'; Tricia Armstrong in Coronation Street from 1994 to 1997, and Ginny in three series of Richard Harris's Outside Edge. She appeared in EastEnders as Roxy Drake, The Ghost Hunter as Mrs Oliver, Love + Hate as Gaynor, and in an episode of Midsomer Murders ("Dead Letters", 2006).

In 2008, she appeared in a series of commercials for supermarket chain Sainsbury's playing Sarah, a mother-of-two and Sainsbury's employee who does her weekly shopping at the store. In 2014, she appeared as Lyndsey Bernstein in Law & Order: UK, Pam in Undeniable, and as Carole in Emmerdale.

=== Film ===
In Charles and Diana: Unhappily Ever After (1992), Brabin played Sarah, Duchess of York. In 2012, she played Maggie, a mother who comes to realise she is one of a race of aliens, in artist Shezad Dawood’s first feature, the sci-fi art-house film Piercing Brightness.

=== Theatre ===
Brabin played Linda, Sharon and Annie in Simon Beaufoy's play The Full Monty, an adaptation of his screenplay for the film, directed by Sheffield Theatre's Daniel Evans. The play opened at the Sheffield Lyceum to excellent reviews, followed by a national tour and a West End run at the Noël Coward Theatre. The production was nominated for the Best New Comedy at the Laurence Olivier Awards in 2014. Brabin's previous theatre performances include the lead role in Shelagh Stevenson's The Long Road at Curve in Leicester directed by Adel Al Salloum and Joy in Meat written by Jimmy Osbourne for London's 503 Theatre.

=== Writing ===
Brabin has written for Heartbeat, Family Affairs, Crossroads, The Story of Tracy Beaker, and Hollyoaks, on which she worked for two years. She has written for Shameless for Company Pictures and for three series of Seacht – nominated for Best Youth Programme Irish Film and Television Awards in 2011. With her mentor Elizabeth Karlsen, the producer of Made in Dagenham, she was involved on the romantic comedy feature Father August for the prestigious She Writes programme, with Minkie Spiro attached to direct. Brabin wrote an episode of Doctors which was screened in December 2012.

== Political career ==
Brabin publicly endorsed the Labour Party at the 1997 general election, writing an article for the Labour-supporting Daily Mirror newspaper explaining that her father-in-law had died on a hospital trolley while waiting to see a doctor. In May 1998 she appeared in a party political broadcast for the Labour Party, appealing for people to join it. In March 2005, Brabin was the lead member of a group of nine actors to write to The Observer explaining that while they continued to oppose the Blair government's military intervention in Iraq, they still "strongly support the re-election of a Labour government". She canvassed for the Labour Party in the Kirklees council election in 2012.

When Jo Cox was selected as Labour candidate for Batley and Spen, Brabin joined her campaign against the closure of libraries in the constituency.

=== Parliamentary career ===
Official portrait, 2017

In August 2016, Brabin said that she was considering standing in the Batley and Spen by-election, caused by Cox's murder. On 19 September, she was shortlisted along with Labour activist Jane Thomas. Brabin was selected at a meeting on 23 September. The Conservative Party, Liberal Democrats, Green Party and UKIP did not field candidates as a mark of respect to Cox. On 20 October 2016, Brabin was elected with an increased majority of over 16,000. She was then sworn in on 24 October.

Brabin made her maiden speech in the House of Commons on 2 November, paying tribute to her predecessor, whom she described as "inspirational". The speech won applause from fellow MPs.

Brabin retained the seat in the 2017 general election, with a majority of just under 9,000 over the Conservative Party candidate. On 3 July 2017 she was appointed as Shadow Early Years Minister by Labour leader Jeremy Corbyn.

Brabin was re-elected as the MP for Batley & Spen in the 2019 general election, with a majority of 3,525. She was appointed as Shadow Secretary of State for Digital, Culture, Media and Sport in January 2020 after the previous holder, Tom Watson stood down at the 2019 general election. She was replaced as Shadow Culture Secretary in Keir Starmer's Shadow frontbench announcement but made Shadow Minister for Cultural Industries.

In March 2021, a teacher at Batley Grammar School showed cartoons depicting Muhammad, the founder of Islam, from the French satirical magazine Charlie Hebdo during a religious studies lesson. This led to protests. The school apologised and suspended the teacher involved. The teacher was allegedly placed in police protection after receiving death threats. Brabin responded to this by stating that she condemned the threats towards the teacher, welcomed the apology given by the school, and urged "all involved to work together and calm the situation".

=== Mayor of West Yorkshire ===
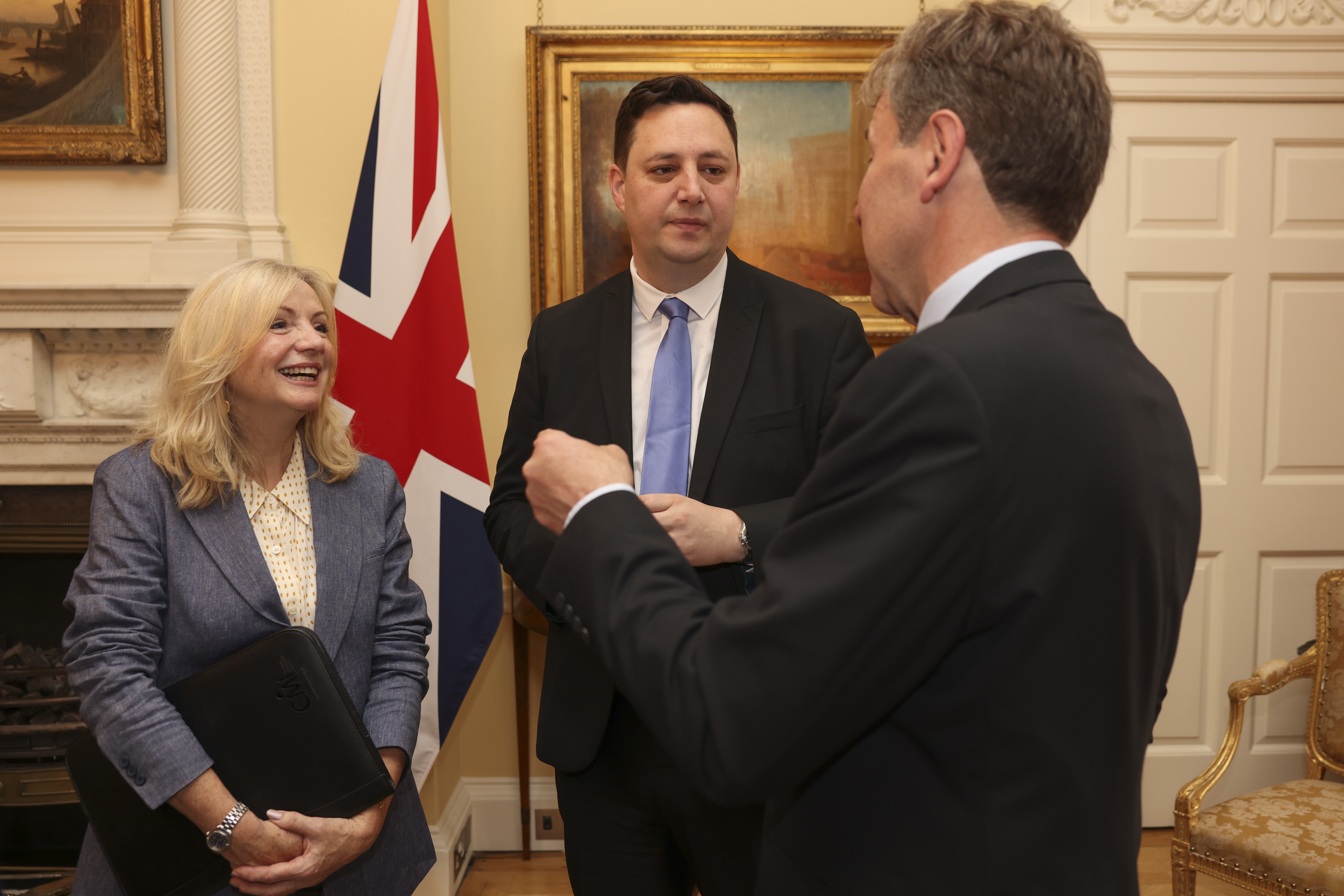
Brabin with Ben Houchen, at a meeting of metro mayors, at 10 Downing Street

Brabin was the Labour Party's nomination for the inaugural Mayor of West Yorkshire in the 2021 election. As a result, she stood down from her frontbench role to focus on her mayoral campaign, with Alison McGovern taking over her responsibilities. The mayoralty includes powers over transport, crime and planning in the region of 2.3 million people, which includes the cities of Leeds, Bradford and Wakefield.

In the election, held on 6 May 2021, Brabin won 43% of the first-round vote, failing to secure a majority, and 59.8% of transfer second-round votes, with the closest challenger being Matthew Robinson of the Conservative Party. This made her the first woman to be elected as a strategic authority mayor. Upon taking office, she became entitled to the style of Mayor. Brabin follows two former Labour MPs – Andy Burnham and Steve Rotheram in Greater Manchester and the Liverpool City Region respectively – representing their regions as mayor, while Dan Jarvis, mayor of the Sheffield City Region, concurrently remained the member of parliament for Barnsley Central. However, Brabin had to resign her Batley and Spen seat, triggering a by-election, as Electoral Commission rules make the police and crime responsibilities in the role incompatible with being an MP.

Brabin stood for a second term in the 2024 West Yorkshire mayoral election, and retained the position.

In March 2024, Brabin announced that buses within the West Yorkshire Combined Authority would be franchised starting in 2027, with the announcement of a unified Weaver Network brand additionally taking place in May 2025.

== Filmography ==
=== Television credits ===
Year	Title	Role
1987	But First This!	Presenter
1989	A Bit of a Do	Sandra Pickersgill
1989	Hale and Pace	Various characters
1989	Coronation Street	Chloe (2 episodes)
1991	Riff-Raff	Singer
1992	El C.I.D.	Fran
1992	Charles and Diana: Unhappily Ever After	Sarah, Duchess of York
1994	Peak Practice	Lou Clarke
1994–1997	Coronation Street	Tricia Armstrong (193 episodes)
1994–1996	Outside Edge	Ginnie Willis (9 episodes)
1995	Mayday Mayday	Sylvia Redpath
1999	Sunburn	Sheila Adams
2000–2001	The Ghost Hunter	Mrs. Oliver
2000	Where the Heart Is	Stella Taylor
2000	The Bill	Mrs. Sanderson
2000	Doctors	Lucy Carlton
2001	EastEnders	Roxy Drake (7 episodes)
2001	Holby City	Lucy Gartside
2002	Nice Guy Eddie	Stephanie
2002	Silent Witness	Nina Palmer
2002	The Bill	Pam
2003	Is Harry on the Boat?	Isobel
2004	Bodies	Karen Taylor
2004	Heartbeat	Sandra Tetley
2005	Coronation Street: The Duckworth Family Album	Herself
2005	Love + Hate	Gaynor
2005	Holby City	Stella Howard
2006	An Audience with Coronation Street	Herself
2006	Rosemary & Thyme	Nicola Spicer
2006	Midsomer Murders	Ruth Chalk
2006	Strictly Confidential	Tina Roebottom
2006	Doctors	Tina Machin
2007	Casualty	Veek Kitching
2007	The Real Extras	Herself
2007	The Good Samaritan	Gloria
2008	Doctors	Amanda Webster
2008	The Bill	Isabel Edgar
2009	Casualty	April
2014	Emmerdale	Carole (7 episodes)
2014	Law & Order: UK	Lindsey Bernstein
2014	Casualty	Roz Conlon

=== Writing credits ===
- Crossroads (2001)
- The Story of Tracy Beaker (2003–2005)
- Tracy Beaker Parties with Pudsey (2004)
- Heartbeat (2005)
- Family Affairs (2005)
- Hollyoaks (2008–2010)
- Shameless (2009)
- Seacht (2011)
- Doctors (2012)

Parliament of the United Kingdom
Preceded by Jo Cox	Member of Parliament for Batley and Spen; 2016–2021	Succeeded by Kim Leadbeater
