= West Yorkshire Combined Authority =

Strategic authority and combined authority in England

- West Yorkshire within England

Type
- Type: Combined authority of West Yorkshire
- Houses: Unicameral
- Term limits: None

History
- Founded: 1 April 2014
- Preceded by: West Yorkshire Integrated Transport Authority

Leadership
- Mayor: Tracy Brabin, Labour Co-op since 10 May 2021
- Chief Executive: Ben Still since 2018

Structure
- Seats: 11 members
- Graph of the party split among 11 seats.
- Mayor committees: District Engagement; Governance and Audit; Investment; Overview and Scrutiny; Transport

Elections
- Mayor voting system: First past the post
- Combined Authority voting system: Indirect election
- Last Mayor election: 2 May 2024
- Next Mayor election: 4 May 2028

Meeting place
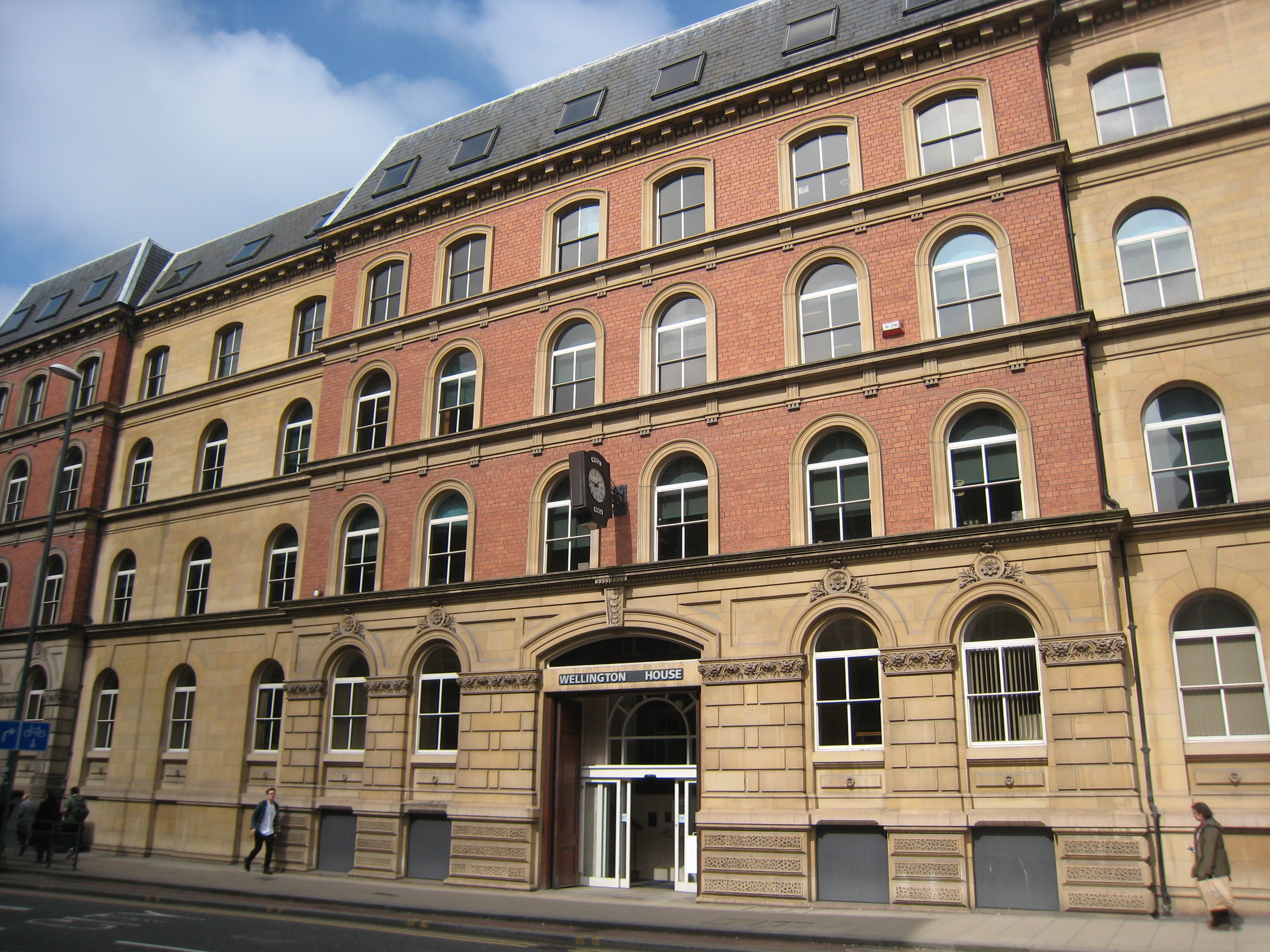
- Wellington House, 40-50 Wellington Street, Leeds, LS1 2DE

Website
- www.westyorks-ca.gov.uk

The West Yorkshire Combined Authority (WYCA) is the combined authority for West Yorkshire in England. It was established by statutory instrument under the Local Democracy, Economic Development and Construction Act 2009 on 1 April 2014. It is a strategic authority with powers over transport, economic development and regeneration. The head of the regional authority is devolved Mayor Tracy Brabin.

== History ==
The abolition of West Yorkshire County Council in 1986 left the county without a single authority covering the whole area, although some council functions including archive services and Trading Standards continued to be provided jointly, through West Yorkshire Joint Services, and the West Yorkshire Passenger Transport Executive and West Yorkshire Police continued to operate across the county.

Since April 2007 the Leeds City Region Partnership has evolved to coordinate activities across the Leeds City Region, which includes Barnsley in South Yorkshire, the City of York and three districts of North Yorkshire, as well as the whole of West Yorkshire. Strategic local governance decisions have been made by the joint committee of the Leeds City Region Leaders Board. A multi-area agreement was established in 2008 and since 2011 economic development has been supported by the Leeds City Region LEP, which forms a business-led local enterprise partnership.

The West Yorkshire Combined Authority was proposed in 2012 as part of a "city deal". The combined authority covered only West Yorkshire, not the other Leeds City Region areas. To create a combined authority the local authorities had to undertake a governance review and produce a scheme of their proposals. A consultation ran from November 2013 to January 2014 and the responses were published in February 2014. The combined authority was established on 1 April 2014, following statutory approval on 31 March 2014.

In June 2017 plans for the combined authority to re-brand as the Leeds City Region Combined Authority were shelved, as Bradford councillor Simon Cooke said it would "piss a few people off". Peter Box, then leader of Wakefield Council, agreed with Simon Cooke's opinion.

The combined authority originally did not have a mayor. The constituent members of the WYCA supported a mayor covering all of Yorkshire, but the UK government refused this idea. The Mayor of West Yorkshire position was agreed in March 2020, the role's first election took place in May 2021.

== Membership ==
There are a total of ten members in addition to the mayor, with five members being appointed by the constituent councils, three additional members from constituent councils chosen to reflect political balance, one non-constituent council member, and one member nominated by the West Yorkshire Business Board. The mayor is a member of the Mayoral Council for England and the Council of the Nations and Regions.

Name	Membership	Position within nominating authority	Nominating authority
Tracy Brabin	Constituent	Mayor of West Yorkshire	West Yorkshire Combined Authority
Stephen Place	Constituent	Leader of the Council	Bradford City Council
Dan Sutherland	Constituent	Leader of the Council	Calderdale Metropolitan Borough Council
Sarah Wood	Constituent	Leader of the Council	Kirklees Metropolitan Borough Council
James Lewis	Constituent	Leader of the Council	Leeds City Council
Karl Johnson	Constituent	Leader of the Council	Wakefield Metropolitan District Council
Claire Douglas	Non-constituent	Leader of the Council	City of York Council
Mandy Ridyard	Non-constituent	Chair (Business Advisor to the Mayor)	West Yorkshire Business Board (formerly Leeds City Region LEP)
Adam Wilkinson	Balance		Calderdale Metropolitan Borough Council
Alan Lamb	Balance		Leeds City Council
Andrew Cooper	Balance		Kirklees Metropolitan District Council

== Structure ==
The Combined Authority operates through three committees: the West Yorkshire and York Investment Committee, Transport Committee and Overview and Scrutiny Committee. The Transport Committee replaced the West Yorkshire Integrated Transport Authority. A Governance and Audit Committee also advises the authority in relation to financial management and governance. Public transport policy is delivered through the Metro brand, which was previously the public facing identity of the West Yorkshire Passenger Transport Executive.

== Other roles ==
The West Yorkshire Combined Authority took over the responsibility of payment for the Apprenticeship Grant for Employers in 2015.
