= Wakefield Council elections =

Local government elections in West Yorkshire, England

One third of Wakefield Metropolitan District Council in West Yorkshire, England is elected each year for 3 years, followed by one year without an election. 63 councillors are elected with 3 from each of the 21 wards.

== Council elections ==
- 1998 Wakefield Metropolitan District Council election
- 1999 Wakefield Metropolitan District Council election
- 2000 Wakefield Metropolitan District Council election
- 2002 Wakefield Metropolitan District Council election
- 2003 Wakefield Metropolitan District Council election
- 2004 Wakefield Metropolitan District Council election (whole council elected after boundary changes)
- 2006 Wakefield Metropolitan District Council election
- 2007 Wakefield Metropolitan District Council election
- 2008 Wakefield Metropolitan District Council election
- 2010 Wakefield Metropolitan District Council election
- 2011 Wakefield Metropolitan District Council election
- 2012 Wakefield Metropolitan District Council election
- 2014 Wakefield Metropolitan District Council election
- 2015 Wakefield Metropolitan District Council election
- 2016 Wakefield Metropolitan District Council election
- 2018 Wakefield Metropolitan District Council election
- 2019 Wakefield Metropolitan District Council election
- 2021 Wakefield Metropolitan District Council election
- 2022 Wakefield Metropolitan District Council election
- 2023 Wakefield Metropolitan District Council election
- 2024 Wakefield Metropolitan District Council election
- 2026 Wakefield Metropolitan District Council election

== Borough result maps ==
2004 results map

2006 results map

2007 results map

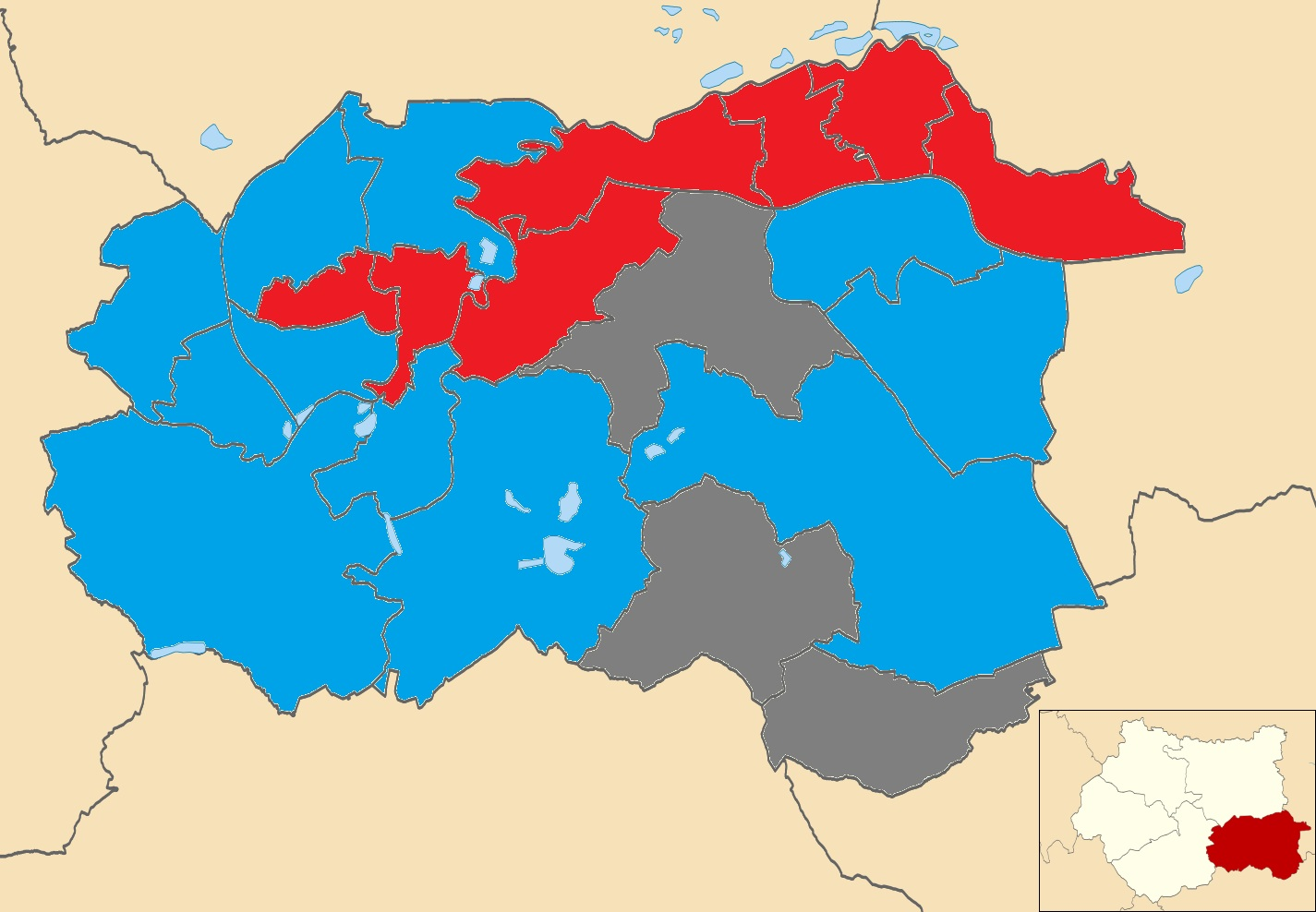
2008 results map

2010 results map

2011 results map

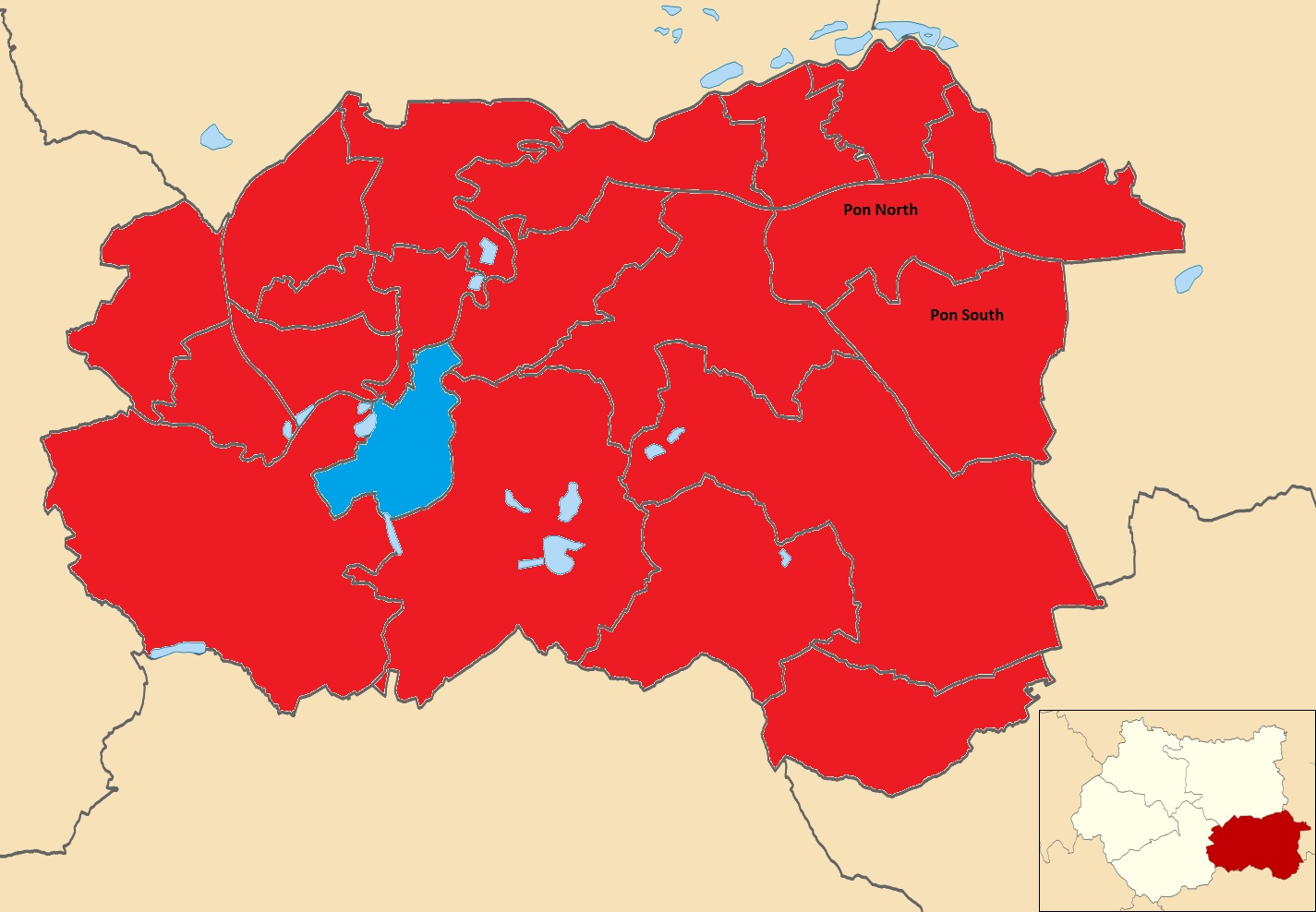
2012 results map

2014 results map

2015 results map

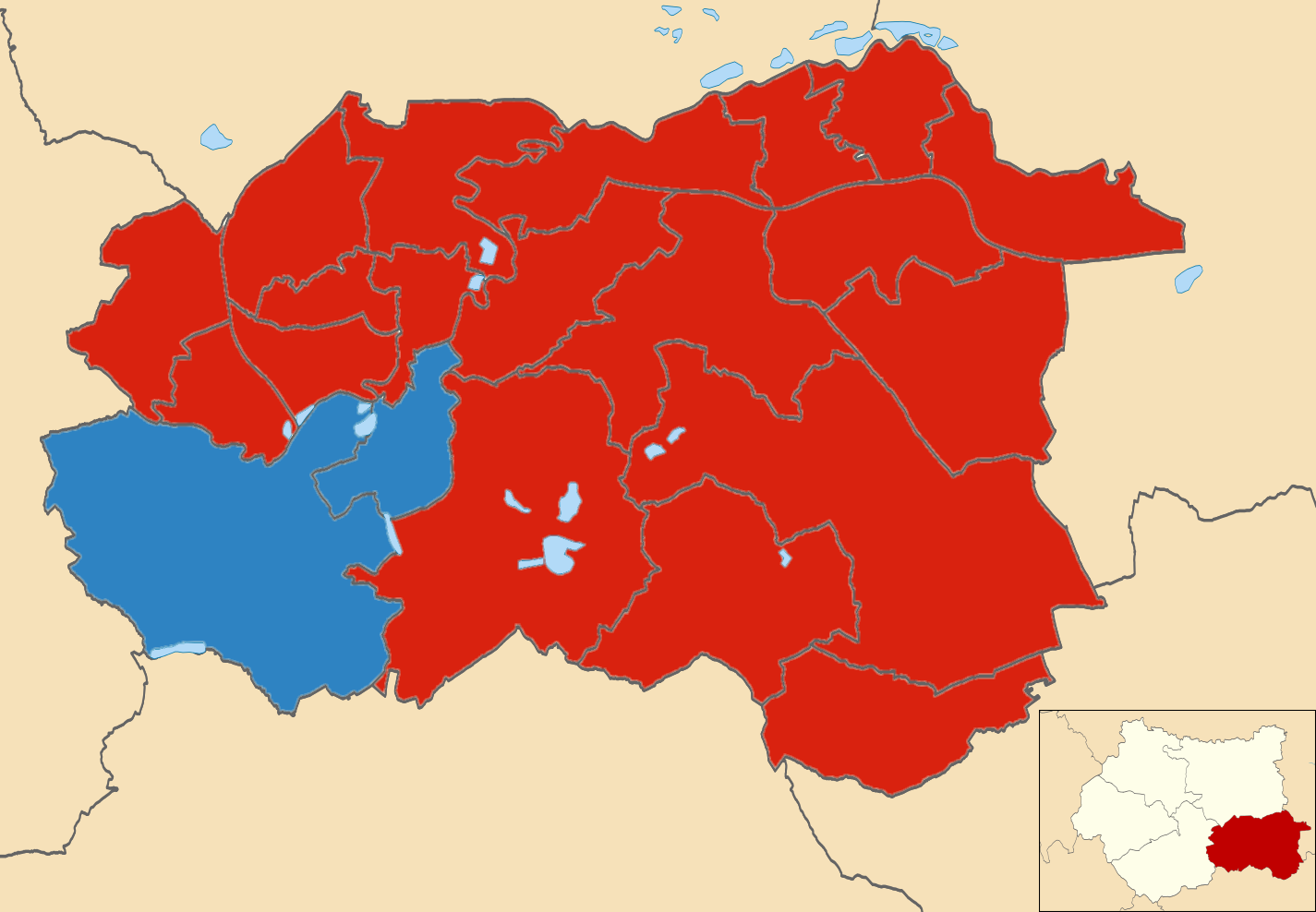
2016 results map

2018 results map

2019 results map

2021 results map

2022 results map

2023 results map

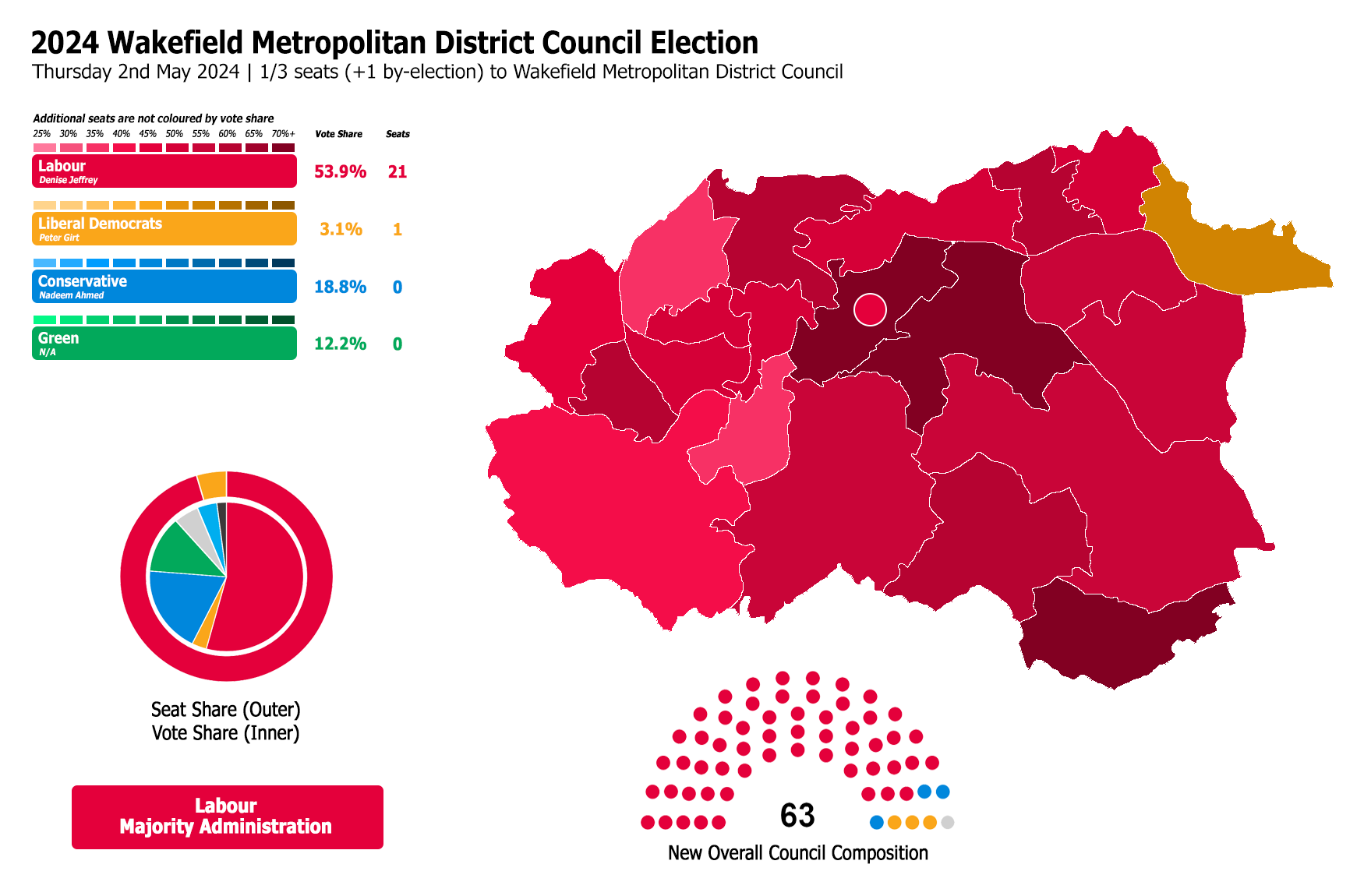
2024 results map

2026 results map

== By-election results ==
=== 1998-2002 ===
Wakefield Central By-Election 18 June 1998
| Party | Candidate | Votes | % | ±% |
|---|---|---|---|---|
| Labour | Tony Richardson | 988 | 49.3 | −22.8 |
| Conservative | Kenneth Blackburn | 661 | 33.0 | +15.4 |
| Liberal Democrats | Mark Goodair | 356 | 17.8 | +7.4 |
| Majority | | 327 | 16.3 | |
| Turnout | | 2,005 | 17.9 | |
| Labour hold | | Swing | | |

Pontefract South By-Election 7 October 1999
| Party | Candidate | Votes | % | ±% |
|---|---|---|---|---|
| Labour | | 833 | 55.0 | +2.7 |
| Conservative | | 511 | 37.7 | −1.7 |
| Liberal Democrats | Douglas Dale | 171 | 11.3 | −1.0 |
| Majority | | 322 | 17.3 | |
| Turnout | | 1,515 | 14.1 | |
| Labour hold | | Swing | | |

=== 2001-2009 ===
Pontefract South By-Election 7 June 2001
| Party | Candidate | Votes | % | ±% |
|---|---|---|---|---|
| Labour | | 3,013 | 51.8 | +3.2 |
| Conservative | | 2,004 | 34.5 | −5.3 |
| Liberal Democrats | Mark Goodair | 797 | 13.7 | +2.1 |
| Majority | | 1,009 | 17.3 | |
| Turnout | | 5,814 | 54.6 | |
| Labour hold | | Swing | | |

Horbury By-Election 4 October 2001
| Party | Candidate | Votes | % | ±% |
|---|---|---|---|---|
| Labour | | 848 | 42.7 | +10.3 |
| Conservative | | 605 | 30.4 | −14.6 |
| Liberal Democrats | Mark Goodair | 405 | 20.4 | −2.2 |
| Independent | | 69 | 3.5 | +3.5 |
| Independent | | 60 | 3.0 | +3.0 |
| Majority | | 243 | 12.3 | |
| Turnout | | 1,987 | 16.5 | |
| Labour hold | | Swing | | |

=== 2002-2006 ===
Horbury and South Ossett By-Election 21 April 2005
| Party | Candidate | Votes | % | ±% |
|---|---|---|---|---|
| Labour | David Watts | 1,156 | 38.2 | +9.4 |
| Conservative | Glenn Armitage | 1,110 | 36.6 | +10.2 |
| Liberal Democrats | Mark Goodair | 764 | 25.2 | +4.4 |
| Majority | | 46 | 1.6 | |
| Turnout | | 3,030 | 26.0 | |
| Labour gain from Conservative | | Swing | | |

=== 2006-2010 ===
Airedale and Ferry Fryston By-Election 21 January 2010
| Party | Candidate | Votes | % | ±% |
|---|---|---|---|---|
| Labour | Les Shaw | 1,330 | 49.9 | +3.2 |
| Liberal Democrats | Paul Kirby | 603 | 22.6 | +8.3 |
| BNP | Stephen Rogerson | 353 | 13.3 | −7.7 |
| Conservative | Carl Milner | 275 | 10.3 | −7.7 |
| Independent | Jason Smart | 102 | 3.8 | +3.8 |
| Majority | | 727 | 27.3 | |
| Turnout | | 2,663 | 23.4 | |
| Labour hold | | Swing | | |

=== 2010-2014 ===
Horbury and South Ossett By-Election 7 July 2011
| Party | Candidate | Votes | % | ±% |
|---|---|---|---|---|
| Labour | Janet Holmes | 1,776 | 51.4 | +2.2% |
| Conservative | Richard Wakefield | 1061 | 30.7 | −10.5% |
| UKIP | David Dews | 232 | 6.7 | +6.7% |
| Liberal Democrats | Mark Goodair | 200 | 5.8 | −3.7% |
| Independent | Norman Tate | 93 | 2.7 | +2.7 |
| Independent | Mark Harrop | 88 | 2.5 | +2.5 |
| Majority | | 715 | 20.7 | |
| Turnout | | 3, 454 | 28.6 | |
| Labour gain from Conservative | | Swing | | |

Castleford and Glasshoughton By-Election 21 February 2013
| Party | Candidate | Votes | % | ±% |
|---|---|---|---|---|
| Labour | Richard Forster | 1,567 | 76.7 | |
| UKIP | Nathan Garbutt | 349 | 17.1 | |
| Conservative | Anne-Marie Glover | 95 | 4.6 | |
| Liberal Democrats | Mark Goodair | 33 | 1.6 | |
| Majority | | 1218 | 60.0 | |
| Turnout | | 2,044 | 16.9 | |
| Labour hold | | Swing | | |

Horbury and South Ossett By-Election 28 November 2013
| Party | Candidate | Votes | % | ±% |
|---|---|---|---|---|
| Labour | Rory Bickerton | 1,061 | 40.3 | −0.2% |
| UKIP | Graham Jesty | 856 | 32.5 | +22.5 |
| Conservative | Angela Howell | 504 | 19.1 | −3.7 |
| Liberal Democrats | Mark Goodair | 212 | 8.1 | −0.2 |
| Majority | | 205 | 7.8 | |
| Turnout | | 2, 633 | 20.77 | |
| Labour hold | | Swing | | |

=== 2014-2018 ===
Pontefract North By-Election 24 September 2015
| Party | Candidate | Votes | % | ±% |
|---|---|---|---|---|
| Labour | Lorna Malkin | 909 | | |
| UKIP | Nathan Garbutt | 453 | | |
| Conservative | Anthony Hill | 299 | | |
| Yorkshire First | Lucy Brown | 124 | | |
| Liberal Democrats | Daniel Woodlock | 86 | | |
| TUSC | Daniel Dearden | 24 | | |
| Majority | | | | |
| Turnout | | | | |
| Labour hold | | Swing | | |

Stanley and Outwood East By-Election 12 October 2017
| Party | Candidate | Votes | % | ±% |
|---|---|---|---|---|
| Labour | Jack Spencer Hemmingway | 1,353 | 51.0 | +2.4 |
| Conservative | Nathan Garbutt Moore | 847 | 31.9 | +7.3 |
| Liberal Democrats | Nicola Kate Sinclair | 165 | 6.2 | +2.3 |
| Yorkshire | Lucy Victoria Brown | 153 | 5.8 | +5.8 |
| UKIP | James Lee Johnston | 136 | 5.1 | −16.4 |
| Majority | | 506 | 19.1 | |
| Turnout | | 2,655 | 21.5 | |
| Labour hold | | Swing | | |

Wakefield West By-Election 23 November 2017
| Party | Candidate | Votes | % | ±% |
|---|---|---|---|---|
| Labour | Michael Paul Graham | 1,118 | 49.6 | |
| Conservative | Dawn Lesley Hunt | 933 | 41.4 | |
| Yorkshire | Paul Phelps | 152 | 6.7 | |
| Liberal Democrats | Peter John Williams | 46 | 2.0 | |
| Majority | | 185 | 8.2 | |
| Turnout | | 2253 | 20.6 | |
| Labour hold | | Swing | | |

=== 2022-2026 ===
Featherstone By-Election 12 December 2024
| Party | Candidate | Votes | % | ±% |
|---|---|---|---|---|
| Labour | Scott Haslam | 893 | 42.1 | |
| Liberal Democrats | Christopher Howden | 548 | 25.9 | |
| Reform | Waj Ali | 463 | 21.8 | |
| Conservative | Pepe Ruzvidzo | 141 | 6.7 | |
| Green | Alexander Wood | 74 | 3.5 | |
| Majority | | 345 | 16.3 | |
| Turnout | | 2,119 | | |
| Labour hold | | Swing | | |
