= Pontefract North =

Electoral ward of Wakefield Council

Coordinates: 53.67°N 1.26°W

- Location within West Yorkshire
- Metropolitan borough: City of Wakefield
- Metropolitan county: West Yorkshire
- Region: Yorkshire and the Humber
- Country: England
- Sovereign state: United Kingdom
- Police: West Yorkshire
- Fire: West Yorkshire
- Ambulance: Yorkshire
- UK Parliament: Pontefract, Castleford and Knottingley

Pontefract North is an electoral ward of the City of Wakefield district, used for elections to Wakefield Metropolitan District Council.

== Overview ==
The ward is one of 21 in the Wakefield district, and has been held by Labour since the current boundaries were formed for the 2004 Council election. As of 2015, the electorate stands at 12,495 of which 94.4% identify as "White British" and 69.3% of who identify as Christian.

Notable landmarks in the ward include Pontefract Racecourse, Pontefract Castle and Valeo Confectionery, with the main areas being Monkhill and Pontefract Town centre.

== Representation ==
Like all wards in the Wakefield district, Pontefract North has 3 councillors, whom are elected on a 4-year-rota. This means elections for new councillors are held for three years running, with one year every four years having no elections.

The current councillors are Clive Tennant, Patricia Garbutt and Lorna Malkin, all of whom are Labour.

The last time a Conservative councillor represented the ward was Philip Thomas who elected in the 2008 Council election however, he ran for re-election as an independent as was subsequently defeated in the 2011 election by Paula Sherriff who would later serve as the Member of Parliament (MP) for Dewsbury between 2015 and 2019.

== Councillors ==
Election	Councillor	Councillor	Councillor
1996	Fredrick Hodgson (Lab)	Jack Kershaw (Lab)	Frank Ward (Lab)
1998	Fredrick Hodgson (Lab)	Jack Kershaw (Lab)	Frank Ward (Lab)
1999	Fredrick Hodgson (Lab)	Jack Kershaw (Lab)	Frank Ward (Lab)
2000	David Grason (Lab)	Jack Kershaw (Lab)	Frank Ward (Lab)
2002	David Grason (Lab)	Jack Kershaw (Lab)	Frank Ward (Lab)
2003	David Grason (Lab)	Jack Kershaw (Lab)	Clive Tennant (Lab)
2004 (new boundaries)	Patricia Garbutt (Lab)	Jack Kershaw (Lab)	Clive Tennant (Lab)
2006	Patricia Garbutt (Lab)	Jack Kershaw (Lab)	Clive Tennant (Lab)
2007	Patricia Garbutt (Lab)	Jack Kershaw (Lab)	Clive Tennant (Lab)
2008	Patricia Garbutt (Lab)	Philip Thomas (Cons)	Clive Tennant (Lab)
2010	Patricia Garbutt (Lab)	Philip Thomas (Cons)	Clive Tennant (Lab)
2011	Patricia Garbutt (Lab)	Philip Thomas (Cons)	Clive Tennant (Lab)
2012	Patricia Garbutt (Lab)	Paula Sherriff (Lab)	Clive Tennant (Lab)
2014	Patricia Garbutt (Lab)	Paula Sherriff (Lab)	Clive Tennant (Lab)
2015	Patricia Garbutt (Lab)	Paula Sherriff (Lab)	Clive Tennant (Lab)
2015 by-election	Patricia Garbutt (Lab)	Lorna Malkin (Lab)	Clive Tennant (Lab)
2016	Patricia Garbutt (Lab)	Lorna Malkin (Lab)	Clive Tennant (Lab)
2018	Patricia Garbutt (Lab)	Lorna Malkin (Lab)	Clive Tennant (Lab)
2019	Patricia Garbutt (Lab)	Lorna Malkin (Lab)	Clive Tennant (Lab)
2021	Patricia Garbutt (Lab)	Lorna Malkin (Lab)	Clive Tennant (Lab)
2022	Patricia Garbutt (Lab)	Lorna Malkin (Lab)	Clive Tennant (Lab)

== Election results ==
2021: Pontefract North
Party	Candidate	Votes	%	±%
Labour	Lorna Malkin	1,653	46.1	+4.7
Conservative	Chris Hyomes	1,120	31.2	+11.8
Yorkshire	Ryan Kett	628	17.5	−21.7
Green	Emma Tingle	183	5.1	+5.1
Majority		533	14.9	+12.7
Turnout		3,584	25.4	+3.3
Labour hold				

2019: Pontefract North
Party	Candidate	Votes	%	±%
Labour	Patricia Garbutt	1214	41.4	−18.8
Yorkshire	Steven Crookes	1148	39.2	+29.9
Conservative	Chris Hyomes	570	24.9	−5.5
Majority		66	2.2	−20.3
Turnout		2932	22.1	−0.4
Rejected ballots		54		
Labour hold		Swing		

2018: Pontefract North
Party	Candidate	Votes	%	±%
Labour	Clive Tennant	1724	60.2	+6.9
Conservative	Chris Hyomes	714	24.9	+9.2
Yorkshire	Arnie Craven	266	9.3	+3.7
Green	Rennie Smith	162	5.7	N/A
Majority		1010	35.3	+7.2
Turnout		2866	22.5	−3.6
Rejected ballots		3		
Labour hold		Swing		

2016: Pontefract North
Party	Candidate	Votes	%	±%
Labour	Lorna Malkin	1601	53.3	
UKIP	Joshua Spencer	762	25.4	
Conservative	Chris Hyomes	470	15.7	
Yorkshire First	Arnie Craven	168	5.6	
Majority		839	27.9	
Turnout		3001	26.1	
Labour hold		Swing		

2015 By-election: Pontefract North
Party	Candidate	Votes	%	±%
Labour	Lorna Malkin	909	48.0	−3.7
UKIP	Nathan Garbutt	453	23.9	+2.3
Conservative	Anthony David Hill	299	15.8	−5.1
Yorkshire First	Lucy Brown	124	6.5	N/A
Liberal Democrats	Daniel Woodlock	86	4.5	N/A
TUSC	Daniel Dearden	24	1.3	−0.2
Turnout		1895		
Labour hold		Swing		

*The by-election follows the resignation of Paula Sheriff who was elected the MP for Dewsbury.

2015: Pontefract North
Party	Candidate	Votes	%	±%
Labour	Pat Garbutt	3398	51.7	+3.1
UKIP	Nathan Garbutt	1422	21.6	−14.0
Conservative	Chris Speight	1375	20.9	+7.2
Green	Rennie Smith	286	4.3	N/A
TUSC	Daniel Dearden	97	1.5	−0.6
Majority		1976	30.1	+17.1
Turnout		6578	54.0	+25.7
Labour hold		Swing		

2014: Pontefract North
Party	Candidate	Votes	%	±%
Labour	Clive Tennant	1645	48.6	+0.7
UKIP	Nathan Garbutt	1205	35.6	+24.9
Conservative	Amy Swift	463	13.7	−0.3
TUSC	Daniel Dearden	71	2.1	−0.1
Majority		440	13.0	−12.6
Turnout		3384	28.3	+0.2
Labour hold		Swing		

2012: Pontefract North
Party	Candidate	Votes	%	±%
Labour	Paula Sherriff	1,649	47.9	−11.9
Independent	Jack Kershaw	769	22.3	+22.3
Conservative	Hannah Crowther	481	14	−9.6
UKIP	Nathan Garbutt	368	10.7	0
Green	Rennie Smith	103	3.0	−2.4
TUSC	Daniel Dearden	76	2.2	+2.2
Majority		880	25.5	−10.6
Turnout		3,446	28.1	−3.1
Labour gain from Conservative		Swing		

2011: Pontefract North
Party	Candidate	Votes	%	±%
Labour	Pat Garbutt	2,261	59.8	+14.2
Conservative	Chris Speight	894	23.6	−0.2
UKIP	Justin Hudson	403	10.7	+10.7
Green	Rennie Smith	205	5.4	+3.2
Majority		1,367	36.1	+14.3
Turnout		3,784	31.2	−24.4
Labour hold		Swing		

2010: Pontefract North
Party	Candidate	Votes	%	±%
Labour	Clive Tennant	3,051	45.6	
Conservative	Carl Milner	1,594	23.8	
Liberal Democrats	Doug Dale	1,008	15.1	
Independent	Bob Evison	279	4.2	
Green	Rennie Smith	150	2.2	
Majority		1,457	21.8	
Turnout		6,692	55.6	
Labour hold		Swing		

2008: Pontefract North
Party	Candidate	Votes	%	±%
Conservative	Philip Thomas	1,352	40.8	−6.4
Labour	Jack Kershaw	1,323	39.9	−12.9
Independent	Bob Evison	398	12.0	+12.0
Green	Rennie Smith	240	7.2	+7.2
Majority		29	0.9	
Turnout		3,313		
Conservative gain from Labour		Swing		

2007: Pontefract North
Party	Candidate	Votes	%	±%
Labour	Patricia Garbutt	1,695	52.8	−9.2
Conservative	Philip Thomas	1,517	47.2	+9.2
Majority		178	5.6	−18.4
Turnout		3,212		
Labour hold		Swing		

2006: Pontefract North
Party	Candidate	Votes	%	±%
Labour	Clive Tennant	1,757	62.0	
Conservative	Mellisa Wan Omer	1,077	38.0	
Majority		680	24.0	
Turnout		2,834		
Labour hold		Swing		

2004: Pontefract North
Party	Candidate	Votes	%	±%
Labour	Jack Kershaw	2,008		
Labour	Patricia Garbutt	1,716		
Labour	Clive Tennant	1,599		
UKIP	Stephanie Wilder	994		
UKIP	Howard Burdon	848		
Conservative	Geoffrey Walsh	838		
Conservative	Eamonn Mullins	838		
Conservative	Catherine Campbell-Reitzik	783		
Socialist Alternative	John Gill	232		
Turnout		9,856	35.6	

*The 2004 election was the first one with the new boundaries. As such, all three seats were up for election.

2003: Pontefract North
Party	Candidate	Votes	%	±%
Labour	Clive Tennant	1,443	58.2	−10.0
Conservative	Richard Molloy	536	21.6	−1.6
UKIP	Howard Burdon	352	14.2	+14.2
Socialist Alternative	John Gill	149	6.0	+1.1
Majority		907	36.6	−8.4
Turnout		2,480	19.7	−1.3
Labour hold		Swing		

2002: Pontefract North
Party	Candidate	Votes	%	±%
Labour	Jack Kershaw	1,875	68.2	−2.9
Conservative	Richard Molloy	638	23.2	−5.7
Socialist Alternative	John Gill	134	4.9	+4.9
Socialist Labour	Zane Carpenter	103	3.7	+3.7
Majority		1,237	45.0	+2.8
Turnout		2,750	21.0	+4.2
Labour hold		Swing		

2000: Pontefract North
Party	Candidate	Votes	%	±%
Labour	David Grason	1,453	71.1	
Conservative	June Drysdale	590	28.9	
Majority		863	42.2	
Turnout		2,043	16.8	
Labour hold		Swing		

1999: Pontefract North
Party	Candidate	Votes	%	±%
Labour	Frank Ward	1,757	81.9	
Conservative	June Drysdale	385	17.9	
Majority		1,327		
Turnout		2,149		
Labour hold		Swing		

1998: Pontefract North
Party	Candidate	Votes	%	±%
Labour	Jack Kershaw	1,870	83.1	
Conservative	June Drysdale	372	14.5	
Majority		1,498		
Turnout		1,498	19.24	
Labour hold		Swing		
