= Knottingley & Ferrybridge (electoral ward) =

Electoral ward of Wakefield Council

Coordinates: 53.705°N 1.249°W

Knottingley
- Location within West Yorkshire
- Metropolitan borough: City of Wakefield
- Metropolitan county: West Yorkshire
- Region: Yorkshire and the Humber
- Country: England
- Sovereign state: United Kingdom
- Dialling code: 01977
- Police: West Yorkshire
- Fire: West Yorkshire
- Ambulance: Yorkshire
- UK Parliament: Pontefract, Castleford and Knottingley

Knottingley is an electoral ward of the City of Wakefield district used for elections to Wakefield Metropolitan District Council.

== Overview ==
The ward is one of 21 in the Wakefield district and has had the same boundaries since the 2004 Council election. As of 2015, the electorate stands at 12,495 of which 96.2% identify as "White British" and 69.4% of who identify as Christian.

Notable parts of the ward include Knottingley and Ferrybridge with notable landmarks including Ferrybridge Power Stations, Kellingley Colliery and Willow Garth Nature Reserve.

== Representation ==
Like all wards in the Wakefield district, Knottingley has 3 councillors, whom are elected on a 4-year-rota. This means elections for new councillors are held for three years running, with one year every four years having no elections.

The current councillors are the Liberal Democrats' Adele Hayes, Peter Girt and Rachel Speak. Knottingley is the only ward with a Liberal Democrat councillor in Wakefield Council since 2011, winning the seat after not standing a candidate in the ward since 2003.

== Councillors ==
Election	Councillor	Councillor	Councillor
1996	Glenn Burton (Lab)	Graham Stokes (Lab)	Graham Clarke (Lab)
1998	Glenn Burton (Lab)	Graham Stokes (Lab)	Graham Clarke (Lab)
1999	Glenn Burton (Lab)	Graham Stokes (Lab)	Graham Clarke (Lab)
2000	Glenn Burton (Lab)	Graham Stokes (Lab)	Graham Clarke (Lab)
2002	Glenn Burton (Lab)	Graham Stokes (Lab)	Graham Clarke (Lab)
2003	Glenn Burton (Lab)	Graham Stokes (Lab)	Graham Clarke (Lab)
2004	Glenn Burton (Lab)	Graham Stokes (Lab)	Patricia Doyle (Lab)
2006	Glenn Burton (Lab)	Graham Stokes (Lab)	Patricia Doyle (Lab)
2007	Glenn Burton (Lab)	Graham Stokes (Lab)	Patricia Doyle (Lab)
2008	Glenn Burton (Lab)	Graham Stokes (Lab)	Patricia Doyle (Lab)
2010	Glenn Burton (Lab)	Graham Stokes (Lab)	Harry Ellis (Lab)
2011	Glenn Burton (Lab)	Graham Stokes (Lab)	Harry Ellis (Lab)
2012	Glenn Burton (Lab)	Graham Stokes (Lab)	Harry Ellis (Lab)
2014	Glenn Burton (Lab)	Graham Stokes (Lab)	Harry Ellis (Lab)
2015	Glenn Burton (Lab)	Graham Stokes (Lab)	Harry Ellis (Lab)
2016	Glenn Burton (Lab)	Graham Stokes (Lab)	Harry Ellis (Lab)
2018	Glenn Burton (Lab)	Graham Stokes (Lab)	Harry Ellis (Lab)
2019	Thomas Gordon (LD)	Graham Stokes (Lab)	Harry Ellis (Lab)
2021	Thomas Gordon (LD)	Adele Hayes (LD)	Harry Ellis (Lab)
2022	Thomas Gordon (LD)	Adele Hayes (LD)	Peter Girt (LD)
2023	Rachel Speak (LD)	Adele Hayes (LD)	Peter Girt (LD)
2024	Rachel Speak (LD)	Adele Hayes (LD)	Peter Girt (LD)
2026	Rachel Speak (LD)	Adele Hayes (LD)	William Garbutt (Ref)

== Election results since 1996 ==
2024 Wakefield Metropolitan District Council election
Party	Candidate	Votes	%	±%
Liberal Democrats	Adele Hayes*	1,363	59.5	+0.9
Labour Co-op	Theo Biddle	695	30.3	–0.5
Conservative	Amy Swift	155	6.8	–0.8
Green	Ruth Love	79	3.4	+0.4
Majority		668	29.2	+1.4
Turnout		2,292	21.6	–1.2
Liberal Democrats hold		Swing	▲0.7	

2023 Wakefield Metropolitan District Council election
Party	Candidate	Votes	%	±%
Liberal Democrats	Rachel Nadine Speak	1,398	58.6	−4.5
Labour	Theo Biddle	734	30.8	+9.5
Conservative	Eamonn Malachy Mullins	182	7.6	−0.2
Green	Ruth Alexandra Love	72	3.0	−4.8
Majority		664	27.8	
Turnout		2,386	22.8	
Rejected ballots		11		
Liberal Democrats hold		Swing		

2022 Wakefield Metropolitan District Council election
Party	Candidate	Votes	%	±%
Liberal Democrats	Robert Girt	1,504	50.6	−3.6
Labour	Paul Green	1,216	40.9	+12.0
Conservative	Roger Kirby	254	8.5	−5.3
Majority		288	9.7	
Turnout		2,974	28.7	
Liberal Democrats gain from Labour		Swing	▼7.8	

2021 Wakefield Metropolitan District Council election
Party	Candidate	Votes	%	±%
Liberal Democrats	Adele Hayes	1,624	54.2	+54.2
Labour Co-op	Kerron Cross	867	28.9	−32.6
Conservative	Hilary Plumbley	415	13.8	+3.1
Green	Garry Newby	91	3.0	+3.0
Majority		757	25.3	−16.5
Turnout		2,997	28.6	−0.8
Liberal Democrats gain from Labour				

2019 Wakefield Metropolitan District Council election
Party	Candidate	Votes	%	±%
Liberal Democrats	Thomas Gordon	1906	63.1	+63.1
Labour	Glenn Burton	642	21.3	−45.3
Green	Willow Tolley	237	7.8	+7.8
Conservative	Joshua Spencer	235	7.8	−25.6
Majority		1264	41.8	−5.1
Turnout		3020	29.4	+8.7
Rejected ballots		52		
Liberal Democrats gain from Labour		Swing		

2018 Wakefield Metropolitan District Council election
Party	Candidate	Votes	%	±%
Labour	Harry Ellis	1419	66.6	+5.1
Conservative	Joshua Spencer	713	33.4	+22.7
Majority		999	46.9	+13.3
Turnout		2132	20.7	−5.7
Rejected ballots		29		
Labour hold		Swing		

2016 Wakefield Metropolitan District Council election
Party	Candidate	Votes	%	±%
Labour	Graham Stokes	1597	61.5	−15.0
UKIP	Lewis Thompson	724	27.9	N/A
Conservative	Eamonn Mullins	277	10.7	−12.8
Majority		873	33.6	−19.4
Turnout		2598	26.4	−24.3
Labour hold		Swing		

2015 Wakefield Metropolitan District Council election
Party	Candidate	Votes	%	±%
Labour	Glen Burton	4070	76.5	−1.4
Conservative	Rebecca Norris	1253	23.5	+1.4
Majority		2817	53.0	−2.8
Turnout		5323	50.7	+26.5
Labour hold		Swing		

2014 Wakefield Metropolitan District Council election
Party	Candidate	Votes	%	±%
Labour	Harry Ellis	1951	77.9	+8.2
Conservative	Rebecca Norris	555	22.1	+11.1
Majority		1395	55.8	+5.4
Turnout		2506	24.2	+0.4
Labour hold		Swing		

2012 Wakefield Metropolitan District Council election
Party	Candidate	Votes	%	±%
Labour	Graham Stokes	1,788	69.7	+12.2
UKIP	Clinton Rhodes	494	19.3	+8.6
Conservative	Jon Wadey	282	11	−4.7
Majority		1,294	50.5	+8.7
Turnout		2,564	23.8	−5.7
Labour hold		Swing		

2011 Wakefield Metropolitan District Council election
Party	Candidate	Votes	%	±%
Labour	Glenn Burton	1,803	57.5	+1.6
Conservative	Jon Wadey	493	15.7	−9.2
Independent	Jack Wright	486	15.5	+15.5
UKIP	Nathan Garbutt	336	10.7	+10.7
Majority		1,319	41.8	+10.8
Turnout		3,135	29.5	−22.7
Labour hold		Swing		

2010 Wakefield Metropolitan District Council election
Party	Candidate	Votes	%	±%
Labour	Harry Ellis	3,092	55.9	
Conservative	Jon Wadey	1,379	24.9	
BNP	Norman Tate	1,012	18.3	
Majority		1,713	31.0	
Turnout		5,528	52.2	
Labour hold		Swing		

2008 Wakefield Metropolitan District Council election
Party	Candidate	Votes	%	±%
Labour	Graham Stokes	1,417	56.7	−4.8
Conservative	Tom Dixon	1,081	43.3	+23.5
Majority		336	13.4	−28.3
Turnout		2,498		
Labour hold		Swing		

2007 Wakefield Metropolitan District Council election
Party	Candidate	Votes	%	±%
Labour	Glenn Burton	1,545	61.5	−2.6
Conservative	Mellisa Wan Omer	498	19.8	−16.1
Independent	Nathan Garbutt	470	18.7	+18.7
Majority		1,047	41.7	+13.5
Turnout		2,513		
Labour hold		Swing		

2006 Wakefield Metropolitan District Council election
Party	Candidate	Votes	%	±%
Labour	Patricia Doyle	1,673	64.1	
Conservative	Nathan Garbutt	937	35.9	
Majority		736	28.2	
Turnout		2,610		
Labour hold		Swing		

2004 Wakefield Metropolitan District Council election
Party	Candidate	Votes	%	±%
Labour	Graham Stokes	1,946		
Labour	Glenn Burton	1,734		
Labour	Patricia Doyle	1,657		
Conservative	Christopher Burns	892		
BNP	Mark Burton	831		
Conservative	Michael Plumbley	695		
Conservative	Madge Richards	587		
Turnout		8,342	35.3	

The boundaries were changed in the 2004 election resulting in all three positions becoming vacant.

2003 Wakefield Metropolitan District Council election
Party	Candidate	Votes	%	±%
Labour	Graham Clarke	1,297	60.4	−15.5
Conservative	David Howarth	403	18.8	−5.3
Liberal Democrats	Carey Chambers	261	12.2	+12.2
UKIP	Colin Batty	185	8.6	+8.6
Majority		894	41.6	−10.2
Turnout		2,146	21.2	+0.5
Labour hold		Swing		

2002 Wakefield Metropolitan District Council election
Party	Candidate	Votes	%	±%
Labour	Graham Stokes	1,667	75.9	+4.4
Conservative	David Howarth	530	24.1	−4.4
Majority		1,137	51.8	+8.8
Turnout		2,197	20.7	+2.9
Labour hold		Swing		

2000 Wakefield Metropolitan District Council election
Party	Candidate	Votes	%	±%
Labour	Glenn Burton	1,338	71.5	
Conservative	Timothy Allerton	533	28.5	
Majority		805	43.0	
Turnout		1,871	17.8	
Labour hold		Swing		

1999 Wakefield Metropolitan District Council election
Party	Candidate	Votes	%	±%
Labour	Graham Clarke	1,607	81.7	
Conservative	Allen Powell	361	18.3	
Turnout		1,968		
Labour hold		Swing		

1998 Wakefield Metropolitan District Council election
Party	Candidate	Votes	%	±%
Labour	Graham Stokes	1,823	83.35	
Conservative	Allen Powell	357	16.32	
Majority		1,446	20.37	
Turnout		2,187		
Labour hold		Swing		

1996 Wakefield Metropolitan District Council election
Party	Candidate	Votes	%	±%
Labour	Glenn Burton	2,430	87.6	
Conservative	Allen Powell	345	12.4	
Turnout		2,775		
Labour hold		Swing		

== See also ==
- Wakefield Metropolitan District Council elections
