= Airedale and Ferry Fryston =

Electoral ward of Wakefield Council

Coordinates: 53.734857°N 1.317456°W

- Location within West Yorkshire
- Metropolitan borough: City of Wakefield
- Metropolitan county: West Yorkshire
- Region: Yorkshire and the Humber
- Country: England
- Sovereign state: United Kingdom
- Police: West Yorkshire
- Fire: West Yorkshire
- Ambulance: Yorkshire
- UK Parliament: Pontefract, Castleford and Knottingley

Airedale and Ferry Fryston is an electoral ward of the City of Wakefield district used for elections to Wakefield Metropolitan District Council.

== Overview ==
The ward is one of 21 in the Wakefield district, and has been held by Labour since the current boundaries were formed for the 2004 Council election. As of 2015, the electorate stands at 12,495 of which 97.2% identify as "White British" and 64.9% of who identify as Christian.

The ward is situated in the north east of the District and forms the eastern part of the settlement of Castleford. The ward is relatively small in area terms, being fairly densely populated. The ward includes a number of different neighbourhoods, including Airedale, Ferry Fryston, Townville and Fryston Village. The northern edge of the ward is defined by the course of the River Aire, while to the east and south the ward is bounded by the A1(M) and M62 motorways.

== Representation ==
Like all wards in the Wakefield district, Pontefract North has 3 councillors, whom are elected on a 4-year-rota. This means elections for new councillors are held for three years running, with one year every four years having no elections.

In 2020, Alex Kear (Independent) was removed from the council after he pleaded guilty to child sexual exploitation charges.

The current councillors are Les Shaw (Labour), Kathryn Scott (Labour) and Jackie Ferguson (Labour).

== Councillors ==
Election	Councillor	Councillor	Councillor
2004	Graham Phelps (Lab)	Yvonne Crewe (Lab)	Stephen Groves (Lab)
2006	Graham Phelps (Lab)	Yvonne Crewe (Lab)	Linda Broom (Lab)
2007	Graham Phelps (Lab)	Yvonne Crewe (Lab)	Linda Broom (Lab)
2008	Graham Phelps (Lab)	Yvonne Crewe (Lab)	Linda Broom (Lab)
2010 By-election	Les Shaw (Lab)	Yvonne Crewe (Lab)	Linda Broom (Lab)
2010	Les Shaw (Lab)	Yvonne Crewe (Lab)	Linda Broom (Lab)
2011	Les Shaw (Lab)	Yvonne Crewe (Lab)	Linda Broom (Lab)
2012	Les Shaw (Lab)	Yvonne Crewe (Lab)	Linda Broom (Lab)
2014	Les Shaw (Lab)	Yvonne Crewe (Lab)	Kathryn Scott (Lab)
2015	Les Shaw (Lab)	Yvonne Crewe (Lab)	Kathryn Scott (Lab)
2016	Les Shaw (Lab)	Yvonne Crewe (Lab)	Kathryn Scott (Lab)
2018	Les Shaw (Lab)	Yvonne Crewe (Lab)	Kathryn Scott (Lab)
2019	Les Shaw (Lab)	Alex Kear (Ind)	Kathryn Scott (Lab)
2020	Les Shaw (Lab)	Vacant	Kathryn Scott (Lab)
2021	Les Shaw (Lab)	Jackie Ferguson (Lab)	Kathryn Scott (Lab)
2022	Les Shaw (Lab)	Jackie Ferguson (Lab)	Kathryn Scott (Lab)

== Ward results ==
2022 Wakefield Metropolitan District Council election
Party	Candidate	Votes	%	±%
Labour	Kathryn Scott*	1,524	61.43	+10.33
Conservative	Richard Evans	541	21.81	−1.29
Independent	Neil Kennedy	311	12.54	+1.04
Liberal Democrats	Leah Birdsall	105	4.23	New
Majority		983	39.62	+11.62
Turnout		2,481	21.4	
Labour hold		Swing		

2021 Wakefield Metropolitan District Council election
Party	Candidate	Votes	%	±%
Labour	Jackie Ferguson	1,190	51.1	+8.8
Labour	Les Shaw	1,116		
Conservative	Richard Evans	567	23.1	+10.6
Independent	Neil Kennedy	522	11.5	+11.5
Conservative	Eamonn Mullins	480		
Independent	Ian Kennedy	367	8.1	+8.1
Green	John Ingham	144	5.7	+5.7
Green	Daniel Russell	120		
Majority		628	28	+25.1
Turnout		N/A		
Labour hold		Swing		
Labour gain from Independent		Swing		

2019 Wakefield Metropolitan District Council election
Party	Candidate	Votes	%	±%
Independent	Alex Kear (Note: Kear was later convicted of sexual offences against children under 13, leading to him being disqualified from sitting as a councillor.)	1166	45.2	+45.2
Labour	Yvonne Crewe	1091	42.3	−31.0
Conservative	Eamonn Mullins	321	12.5	−11.3
Majority		75	2.9	−49.5
Turnout		2578	22.4	+3.5
Rejected ballots		31		
Independent gain from Labour		Swing		

2018 Wakefield Metropolitan District Council election
Party	Candidate	Votes	%	±%
Labour	Kathryn Scott	1662	76.2	−5.9
Conservative	Eamonn Mullins	520	23.8	+5.9
Majority		1142	52.4	+0.2
Turnout		2182	18.9	−4.6
Rejected ballots		10		
Labour hold		Swing		

2016 Wakefield Metropolitan District Council election
Party	Candidate	Votes	%	±%
Labour	Les Shaw	2142	82.1	+12
Conservative	Amy Swift	467	17.9	+0.0
Majority		1675	52.2	+12
Turnout		2609	23.5	−26.6
Labour hold		Swing		

2015 Wakefield Metropolitan District Council election
Party	Candidate	Votes	%	±%
Labour	Yvonne Crewe	4103	70.1	+15.7
Conservative	Amy Swift	1047	17.9	+8.8
Green	Simon Addy	706	12.1	N/A
Majority		3056	52.2	+34.3
Turnout		5856	50.1	+25.1
Labour hold		Swing		

2014 Wakefield Metropolitan District Council election
Party	Candidate	Votes	%	±%
Labour	Kathryn Scott	1564	54.4	−18.9
UKIP	William Proctor	1049	36.5	+16.1
Conservative	Mellisa Omer	262	9.1	+2.8
Majority		515	17.9	−35.0
Turnout		2875	25.0	+1.5
Labour hold		Swing		

2012 Wakefield Metropolitan District Council election
Party	Candidate	Votes	%	±%
Labour	Les Shaw	1,977	73.3	−6.8
UKIP	Arnie Craven	556	20.4	+20.4
Conservative	Mellisa Wan Omer	171	6.3	−12.9
Majority		1,441	52.9	−8
Turnout		2,724	23.5	−4.7
Labour hold		Swing		

2011 Wakefield Metropolitan District Council election
Party	Candidate	Votes	%	±%
Labour	Yvonne Crewe	2,611	80.1	+24.4
Conservative	Mellisa Wan Omer	627	19.2	+7.1
Majority		1,984	60.9	+22.2
Turnout		3,258	28.2	−23.4
Labour hold		Swing		

2010 Wakefield Metropolitan District Council election
Party	Candidate	Votes	%	±%
Labour	Linda Broom	3,305	55.7	+9
Liberal Democrats	Paul Kirby	1,009	17.0	+2.7
Conservative	Mellisa Wan Omer	715	12.1	−5.9
BNP	Stephen Rogerson	668	11.3	−9.6
Independent	Jason Smart	220	3.7	+3.7
Majority		2,296	38.7	+12.9
Turnout		5,930	51.6	
Labour hold		Swing	+3.2%	

Airedale and Ferry Fryston By-Election 21 January 2010
Party	Candidate	Votes	%	±%
Labour	Les Shaw	1,330	49.9	+3.2
Liberal Democrats	Paul Kirby	603	22.6	+8.3
BNP	Stephen Rogerson	353	13.3	−7.7
Conservative	Carl Milner	275	10.3	−7.7
Independent	Jason Smart	102	3.8	+3.8
Majority		727	27.3	
Turnout		2,663	23.4	
Labour hold		Swing		

This by-election was held due to the death of Graham Phelps in November 2009.

2008 Wakefield Metropolitan District Council election
Party	Candidate	Votes	%	±%
Labour	Graham Phelps	1,401	46.7	−10.5
BNP	Stephen Rogerson	628	20.9	+2.2
Conservative	Mellisa Wan Omer	540	18.0	+5.3
Liberal Democrats	Paul Kirby	430	14.3	+2.9
Majority		773	25.8	−12.7
Turnout		2,999		
Labour hold		Swing		

2007 Wakefield Metropolitan District Council election
Party	Candidate	Votes	%	±%
Labour	Yvonne Crewe	1,689	57.2	−0.8
BNP	Stephen Rogerson	553	18.7	−6.2
Conservative	Eamonn Mullins	374	12.7	−4.4
Liberal Democrats	Paul Kirby	337	11.4	+11.4
Majority		1,136	38.5	+5.4
Turnout		2,953		
Labour hold		Swing		

2006 Wakefield Metropolitan District Council election
Party	Candidate	Votes	%	±%
Labour	Linda Broom	1,655	58.0	
BNP	Stephen Rogerson	709	24.9	
Conservative	Eamonn Mullins	489	17.1	
Majority		946	33.1	
Turnout		2,853		
Labour hold		Swing		

2004 Wakefield Metropolitan District Council election
Party	Candidate	Votes	%	±%
Labour	Graham Phelps	2,025		
Labour	Yvonne Crewe	1,811		
Labour	Stephen Groves	1,751		
Independent	John Bird	997		
Liberal Democrats	Paul Kirby	679		
Conservative	Mary Barton	469		
Conservative	Pamela Ledgard	418		
Conservative	Rodney Williams	409		
Turnout		8,559	34.0	
