= Monkhill =

Monkhill may refer to the following places in England:

- Monkhill, Cumbria is a small village in Cumbria
- Monkhill, West Yorkshire, an area of Pontefract
  - Pontefract Monkhill railway station a railway station on the Pontefract Line
