= 2021 Wakefield Metropolitan District Council election =

2021 UK local government election

← 2019	6 May 2021	2022 →

One third (21) of 63 seats on the Wakefield Metropolitan District Council and one by-election for Airedale and Ferry Fryston division. 32 seats needed for a majority
Leader	Denise Jeffery	Nadeem Ahmed
Party	Labour	Conservative
Leader's seat	Castleford Central and Glasshoughton	Wakefield South
Last election	13 seats, 42.5%	5 seats, 24.6%
Current seats	49	11
Seats needed	Steady	▲21
Leader		Tom Gordon
Party	Independent	Liberal Democrats
Leader's seat		Knottingley
Last election	2 seats, 6.2%	1 seat, 9.0%
Current seats	2	1
Seats needed	Steady	▲31
- Map showing the results of the 2021 Wakefield Metropolitan District Council election
Incumbent council control
Majority administration
Labour

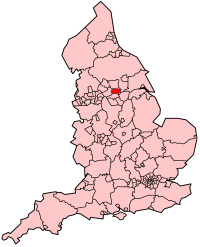
Wakefield Council on England map

The 2021 Wakefield Metropolitan Borough Council election took take place during 2021 to elect members of Wakefield Metropolitan District Council in England. The election was held on the same day as other local elections. The election was originally due to take place in May 2020, but was postponed due to the COVID-19 pandemic.

== Results ==
2021 Wakefield Metropolitan District Council election
Party	This election			Full council			This election		
Party	Seats	Net	Seats %	Other	Total	Total %	Votes	Votes %	+/−
Labour	13	▼6	59.1	30	43	68.3	37,139	45.1	+2.6
Conservative	8	▲6	36.4	9	17	27.0	30,849	37.5	+12.9
Liberal Democrats	1	▲1	4.5	1	2	3.2	2,484	3.0	-6.0
Independent	0	▼1	0.0	1	1	1.6	1,745	2.1	-4.1
Green	0	Steady	0.0	0	0	0.0	5,307	6.4	+3.5
Yorkshire	0	Steady	0.0	0	0	0.0	3,643	4.4	-2.5
Reform UK	0	Steady	0.0	0	0	0.0	309	0.4	New
Alliance for Democracy and Freedom	0	Steady	0.0	0	0	0.0	246	0.3	New
UKIP	0	Steady	0.0	0	0	0.0	220	0.3	-7.1
Workers Party	0	Steady	0.0	0	0	0.0	123	0.1	New
TUSC	0	Steady	0.0	0	0	0.0	118	0.1	New
For Britain	0	Steady	0.0	0	0	0.0	101	0.1	New

Party	Seats			
Party	2016	2018	2019	2021
Labour	53	52	49	43
Conservative	7	11	11	17
Independent	1	0	2	1
Lib Dems	0	0	1	2

=== Ackworth, North Elmsall and Upton ===
The incumbent Labour councillor Martyn Ward stood down, with the Conservative's Raymond Massey winning the seat.

Ackworth, North Elmsall and Upton
Party	Candidate	Votes	%	±%
Conservative	Raymond Massey	1,483	36.6	+18.3
Labour	Stan Bates	1427	35.2	+0.4
Yorkshire	Chris Dawson	447	11.0	−8.0
Liberal Democrats	Christopher Howden	281	6.9	−1.6
Green	Jody Gabriel	271	6.7	+6.7
Independent	Gwen Marshall	144	3.6	−4.2
Majority		56	1.4	−15.9
Turnout		4053	30.3	+3.0
Conservative gain from Labour		Swing	{{{swing}}}	

=== Airedale and Ferry Fryston ===
Incumbent Les Shaw won re-election and Jackie Ferguson won her seat from independent Alex Kear who was expelled from the council after a sexual offense conviction.

Airedale and Ferry Fryston (two seats)
Party	Candidate	Votes	%	±%
Labour	Jackie Ferguson	1,190	51.1	+8.8
Labour	Les Shaw	1,116		
Conservative	Richard Evans	567	23.1	+10.6
Independent	Neil Kennedy	522	11.5	+11.5
Conservative	Eamonn Mullins	480		
Independent	Ian Kennedy	367	8.1	+8.1
Green	John Ingham	144	5.7	+5.7
Green	Daniel Russell	120		
Majority		628	28	+25.1
Turnout		N/A		
Labour hold		Swing		
Labour gain from Independent		Swing		

=== Altofts and Whitwood ===
Former Mayor of Normanton Josie Farrah won the ward, holding it after former council leader Peter Box CBE's resignation.

Altofts and Whitwood
Party	Candidate	Votes	%	±%
Labour	Josie Farrar	1,896	47.5	+8.1
Conservative	Anthony David Hill	1,522	38.1	+21.3
Green	Brenden Beckett	283	7.1	+7.1
Reform UK	John Thomas	209	5.2	+5.2
Workers Party	Zane Carpenter	80	2.0	+2.0
Majority		374	9.4	+2.5
Turnout		3,990	28.1	+3.3
Labour hold		Swing	-6.6	

=== Castleford Central and Glasshoughton ===
Incumbent Richard Forster won re-election.

Castleford Central and Glasshoughton
Party	Candidate	Votes	%	±%
Labour	Richard Forster	2,092	62.4	+19.7
Conservative	Joanne Smart	731	21.8	+13.7
Yorkshire	Paul Phelps	389	11.6	−9.8
Green	Alan Horne	140	4.2	+4.2
Majority		1361	40.6	+20.7
Turnout		3352	26.4	+1.1
Labour hold		Swing	+3.0	

=== Crofton, Ryhill and Walton ===
Paul Stockhill beat incumbent councillor Faith Heptinstall by 79 votes.

Crofton, Ryhill and Walton
Party	Candidate	Votes	%	±%
Conservative	Paul Stockhill	1,985	45.5	+13.2
Labour	Faith Heptinstall	1906	43.7	−5.4
Green	Cynthia Dickinson	474	10.9	+10.9
Majority		79	1.8	−18.0
Turnout		4365	34.9	+7.3
Conservative gain from Labour				

=== Featherstone ===
Incumbent Maureen Tennant-King won re-election.

Featherstone
Party	Candidate	Votes	%	±%
Labour	Maureen Tennant-King	2,104	60.7	−10.3
Conservative	Ayrton Pointon	802	23.1	−5.9
Yorkshire	James Craven	292	8.4	+8.4
Green	Ruth Love	169	4.9	+4.9
Liberal Democrats	Nigel Ebbs	101	2.9	+2.9
Majority		1,302	37.6	−4.4
Turnout		3,468	26.3	+6.9
Labour hold				

=== Hemsworth ===
Incumbent Pauline Kitching won re-election.

Hemsworth
Party	Candidate	Votes	%	±%
Labour	Pauline Kitching	1,314	44.0	+6.5
Independent	Jim Kenyon	647	21.6	+21.6
Conservative	David Pointon	586	19.6	+13.0
Green	Lyn Morton	342	11.4	+5.1
Reform UK	Waj Ali	100	3.3	+3.3
Majority		667	22.4	+10.3
Turnout		2,989	24.7	+0.0
Labour hold				

=== Horbury and South Ossett ===
Incumbent Darren Byford won re-election.

Horbury and South Ossett
Party	Candidate	Votes	%	±%
Labour	Darren Byford	2,231	48.1	+8.9
Conservative	Jonathan Allum	2,070	44.7	+2.1
Liberal Democrats	Mark Goodair	174	3.8	−3.4
Green	Richard Norris	159	3.4	−6.7
Majority		161	3.4	
Turnout		4,634	38.6	
Labour hold				

=== Knottingley ===
Adele Hayes won the seat from incumbent Graham Stokes who stood down.

Knottingley
Party	Candidate	Votes	%	±%
Liberal Democrats	Adele Hayes	1,624	54.2	−8.9
Labour Co-op	Kerron Cross	867	28.9	+7.6
Conservative	Hilary Plumbley	415	13.8	+6.0
Green	Garry Newby	91	3.0	−4.8
Majority		757	25.3	−16.5
Turnout		2,997	28.6	−0.8
Liberal Democrats gain from Labour				

=== Normanton ===
Labour's Julie Medford held the seat after the death of the former councillor Alan Wassell.

Normanton
Party	Candidate	Votes	%	±%
Labour	Julie Medford	1,785	51.8	+6.2
Conservative	Keith Hudson	1,069	31.0	−9.5
Alliance for Democracy and Freedom (UK)	Cliff Parsons	246	7.1	+7.1
Green	Gillian Dewey-Nager	214	6.2	+6.2
Liberal Democrats	Susan Hayes	92	2.7	+2.7
Workers Party	Marcus Whalley-Reid	43	1.2	+1.2
Majority		716	20.8	+15.7
Turnout		3,449	27.1	+3.7
Labour hold				

=== Ossett ===
Incumbent councillor Lynn Masterman (Labour) lost her seat to Conservative Tony Homewood, election agent to Imran Ahmad Khan in the 2019 general election.

Ossett
Party	Candidate	Votes	%	±%
Conservative	Tony Homewood	2,395	53.8	+11.2
Labour	Lynn Masterman	1,729	38.8	−0.4
Green	Stephen Scott	220	4.9	
Liberal Democrats	Malcolm Pollack	111	2.5	−4.7
Majority		666	15.0	+11.6
Turnout		4,455	35.0	+5.6
Conservative gain from Labour				

=== Pontefract North ===
Incumbent councillor Lorna Malkin (Labour) won re-election for her second term, first being elected in a 2015 by-election.

Pontefract North
Party	Candidate	Votes	%	±%
Labour	Lorna Malkin	1,653	46.1	+4.7
Conservative	Chris Hyomes	1,120	31.2	+11.8
Yorkshire	Ryan Kett	628	17.5	−21.7
Green	Emma Tingle	183	5.1	+5.1
Majority		533	14.9	+12.7
Turnout		3,584	25.4	+3.3
Labour hold				

=== Pontefract South ===
Pontefract South
Party	Candidate	Votes	%	±%
Conservative	Tony Hames	1,842	44.7	+4.5
Labour	Melanie Jones	1,712	41.5	−4.9
Yorkshire	Trevor Peasant	390	9.5	+9.5
Green	Katherine Dodd	178	4.3	+4.3
Majority		130	3.2	−3.0
Turnout		4,122	34.3	+6.0
Conservative gain from Labour				

=== South Elmsall and South Kirkby ===
South Elmsall and South Kirkby
Party	Candidate	Votes	%	±%
Labour	Michelle Collins	2,002	60.8	−14.8
Conservative	Chad Thomas	822	25.0	+14.2
Yorkshire	Sarah Mansfield	312	9.5	+9.5
Green	Stefan Ludewig	155	4.7	+4.7
Majority		1180	35.8	−26.2
Turnout		3291	23.8	+3.3
Labour hold				

=== Stanley and Outwood East ===
Stanley and Outwood East
Party	Candidate	Votes	%	±%
Labour	Matthew Morley	2,232	50.1	+5.3
Conservative	Stephanie Fishwick	1,599	35.9	+11.4
Yorkshire	Brent Hawksley	316	7.1	+7.1
Green	Richard Copeland	204	4.6	+4.6
Liberal Democrats	Margaret Dodd	101	2.3	−6.4
Majority		633	14.2	−6.2
Turnout		4452	34.3	+6.5
Labour hold				

=== Wakefield East ===
Wakefield East
Party	Candidate	Votes	%	±%
Conservative	Akef Akbar	1,741	45.8	+33.6
Labour	Helen Antcliff	1693	44.5	−12.4
Green	Janet MacKintosh	252	6.6	−2.3
TUSC	Mick Griffiths	118	3.1	+3.1
Majority		48	1.3	−42.9
Turnout		3804	32.6	+5.9
Conservative gain from Labour				

=== Wakefield North ===
Wakefield North
Party	Candidate	Votes	%	±%
Labour	Betty Rhodes	1,707	46.9	+0.9
Conservative	Naeem Formuli	1,203	33.0	+13.5
Green	Lewis Elliott	320	8.8	+8.8
Yorkshire	Andy Mack	263	7.2	−2.9
UKIP	Keith Wells	85	2.3	−15.0
Independent	Rebecca Murphy	65	1.8	+1.8
Majority		504	13.9	−12.6
Turnout		3,643	29.9	+4.4
Labour hold				

=== Wakefield Rural ===
Wakefield Rural
Party	Candidate	Votes	%	±%
Conservative	Cynthia Binns	2,939	58.8	+14.4
Labour	Paul Wood	1,499	30.0	−3.0
Green	Charlotte Myles	560	11.2	−3.0
Majority		1440	28.8	+17.4
Turnout		4998	35.9	+6.3
Conservative hold				

=== Wakefield South ===
Wakefield South
Party	Candidate	Votes	%	±%
Conservative	Richard Hunt	2,129	50.2	+9.4
Labour	Paul Belbin	1,557	36.7	+8.5
Green	Krys Tal Holmes	289	6.8	N/A
Yorkshire	Dan Cochran	267	6.3	−2.2
Majority		572	13.5	
Turnout		4,242		
Conservative hold				

=== Wakefield West ===
Wakefield West
Party	Candidate	Votes	%	±%
Labour	Hilary Mitchell	1,682	49.2	+0.9
Conservative	Laura Weldon	1,382	40.4	+18.3
Green	Karen Sadler	257	7.5	+7.5
For Britain	Josie Thornton	101	3.0	+3.0
Majority		300	8.8	−16.6
Turnout		3422	30.6	+3.7
Labour hold				

=== Wrenthorpe and Outwood West ===
Wrenthorpe and Outwood West
Party	Candidate	Votes	%	±%
Conservative	Annemarie Glover	1,925	43.5	+10.4
Labour	Martyn Johnson	1745	39.4	+5.2
Yorkshire	Richard Bentley	339	7.7	+0.1
Green	Oliver Thompson	282	6.4	+6.4
UKIP	David Dews	135	3.1	−11.2
Majority		180	4.1	+3.0
Turnout		4,426	33.6	+4.7
Conservative gain from Labour				
