= Monkhill, West Yorkshire =

Area of Pontefract, West Yorkshire, England

Coordinates: 53.700048°N 1.296923°W

Monkhill
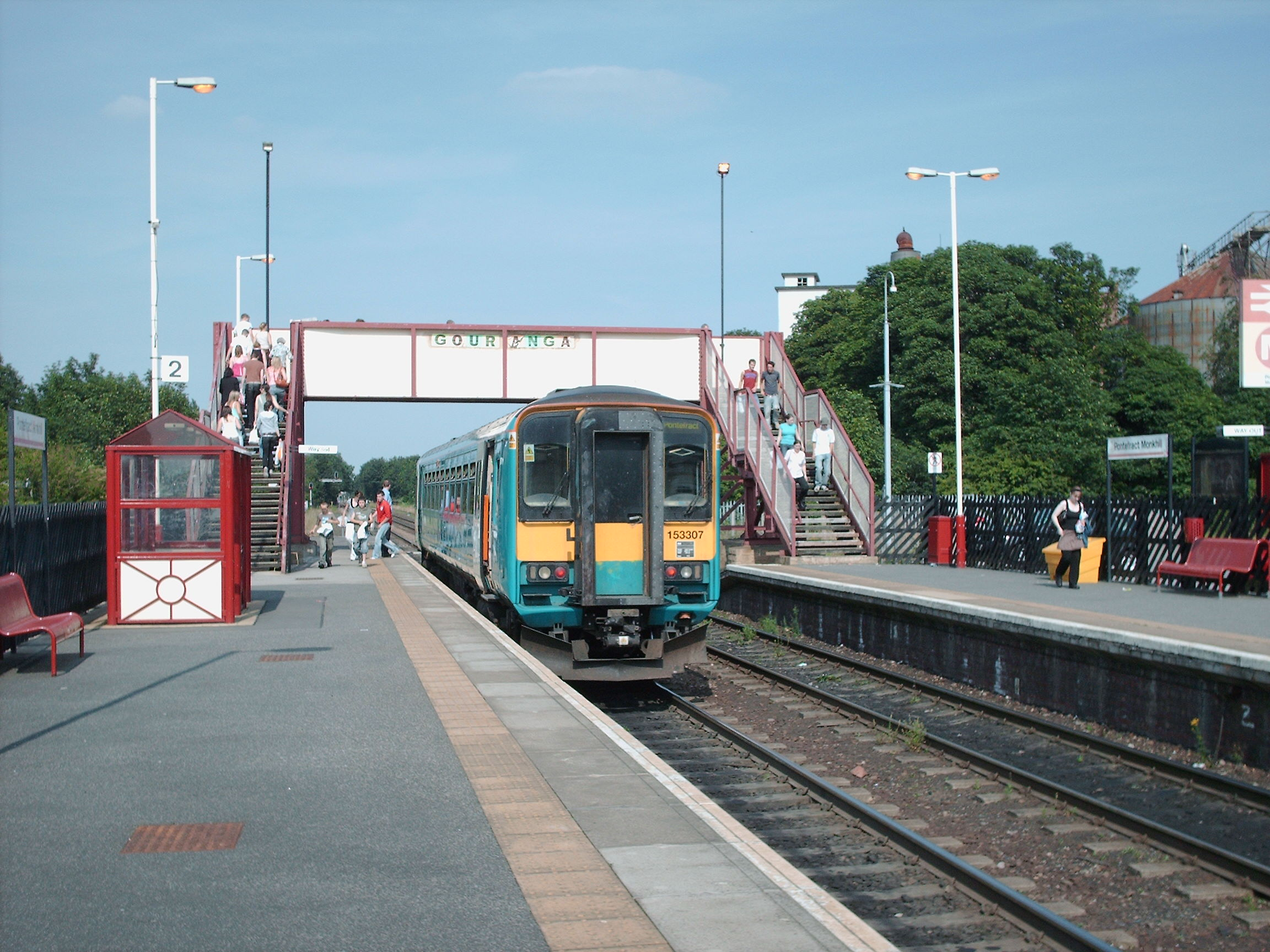
- Pontefract Monkhill station

- Location within West Yorkshire
- Metropolitan borough: Wakefield
- Metropolitan county: West Yorkshire
- Region: Yorkshire and the Humber
- Country: England
- Sovereign state: United Kingdom
- Police: West Yorkshire
- Fire: West Yorkshire
- Ambulance: Yorkshire

Monkhill is an area of Pontefract, in the Wakefield district, in the county of West Yorkshire, England.

== History ==
Monkhill was formerly a township in the parish of Pontefract, in 1866 Monkhill became a separate civil parish, on 26 March 1892 the parish was abolished and merged with Pontefract. In 1881 the parish had a population of 86.

== Amenities ==
Monkhill has two post offices, a school and a railway station called Pontefract Monkhill.
