= 2023 Wakefield Metropolitan District Council election =

- 4 May 2023

21 of 63 seats on Wakefield Council 32 seats needed for a majority

	First party	Second party
Leader	Denise Jeffery	Tony Hames
Party	Labour	Conservative
Leader's seat	Castleford Central and Glasshoughton	Pontefract South
Seats before	43	10
Seats won	20	0
Seats after	49	7
Seat change	+6	-4
	Third party	Fourth party
Leader		Tom Gordon
Party	Independent	Liberal Democrats
Leader's seat		Knottingley
Seats before	6 (Note: Of the five independent councillors prior to the election, two formed the "Wakefield Independent Group", and the other three were described as "Independent".)	3
Seats won	0	1
Seats after	4	3
Seat change	-2	-
- Winner of each seat at the 2023 Wakefield Metropolitan Borough Council election
Leader before election
Denise Jeffery
Labour
Leader after election
Denise Jeffery
Labour

The 2023 Wakefield Metropolitan District Council election took place on 4 May 2023 to elect members of Wakefield Council in West Yorkshire, England. This was on the same day as other local elections across England. There were 21 of the 63 seats up for election, being the usual third of the council.

Labour retained its majority on the council.

== Overview ==
Labour increased its majority by taking four seats from the Conservatives. After the election Labour had 49 councillors. The Conservatives lost all four seats they were defending, leaving them with seven seats. The Liberal Democrats held the one seat they were defending in Knottingley, leaving them with three councillors overall after the election. Both the independent councillors who were standing re-election were defeated, leaving four independent councillors after the election.

== Results summary ==
2023 Wakefield Metropolitan District Council election
Party	This election			Full council			This election		
Party	Seats	Net	Seats %	Other	Total	Total %	Votes	Votes %	+/−
Labour	20	▲6	95.2	29	49	77.8	34,304	52.7	+1.0
Conservative	0	▼4	0.0	7	7	11.1	14,153	21.7	-5.8
Independent	0	▼2	0.0	4	4	6.3	5,415	8.3	+2.9
Liberal Democrats	1	Steady	4.8	2	3	4.8	3,300	5.1	-0.2
Green	0	Steady	0.0	0	0	0.0	4,663	7.2	+2.3
Yorkshire	0	Steady	0.0	0	0	0.0	2,563	3.9	-0.4
Reform	0	Steady	0.0	0	0	0.0	446	0.7	+0.5
TUSC	0	Steady	0.0	0	0	0.0	165	0.3	+0.2
SDP	0	Steady	0.0	0	0	0.0	84	0.1	0.0

== Ward results ==
An asterisk (*) indicates a sitting councillor standing for re-election. Changes with 2019.

=== Ackworth, North Elmsall and Upton ===
Ackworth, North Elmsall and Upton
Party	Candidate	Votes	%	±%
Labour	Jessica Carrington*	1,516	47.5	+12.7
Conservative	Chad Jordan Thomas	579	18.1	−0.2
Independent	Gwen Marshall	550	17.2	+9.3
Reform	Arthur Jerome Miles	293	8.8	New
Green	Jody Paul Gabriel	267	8.4	New
Majority		937	29.4	+12.1
Turnout		3,221	23.9	−3.4
Rejected ballots		28		
Labour hold		Swing		

=== Airedale and Ferry Fryston ===
Comparison for the Wakefield District Independents for this ward are comparing to the Independent candidate in 2019 due to them being of the same grouping, but now formalising this arrangement. However, as a by-election was held in 2021, this seat remains a Labour hold rather than a Labour gain.

Airedale and Ferry Fryston
Party	Candidate	Votes	%	±%
Labour	Les Shaw	1,061	48.6	+6.3
Wakefield District Independents	Neil Kennedy	711	32.5	−12.7
Conservative	Keith Hudson	258	11.8	−0.7
Green	John Paul Ingham	88	4.0	New
Liberal Democrats	Richard Heaps	67	3.1	
Majority		350	16.1	+13.2
Turnout		2,192	19	−3.4
Rejected ballots		7		
Labour hold		Swing		

=== Altofts and Whitwood ===
Comparison for the Wakefield District Independents for this ward are comparing to the Democrats and Veterans candidate in 2019.

Altofts and Whitwood
Party	Candidate	Votes	%	±%
Labour	Jo Hepworth*	1,748	52.8	+13.4
Wakefield District Independents	John Thomas	804	24.3	+17.8
Conservative	Amy Louise Swift	518	15.7	−1.1
Green	Katherine Clare Dodd	238	7.2	New
Majority		944	28.5	+21.6
Turnout		3,308	23.0	−1.8
Rejected ballots		11		
Labour hold		Swing		

=== Castleford Central and Glasshoughton ===
Castleford Central and Glasshoughton
Party	Candidate	Votes	%	±%
Labour	Tony Wallis*	1,657	62.1	+19.4
Yorkshire	Paul Phelps	435	16.3	−6.1
Conservative	Joanne Grace Smart	368	13.8	−5.7
Green	Stephen James Brennan	114	4.3	New
Liberal Democrats	Janet Walton	95	3.6	New
Majority		1,222	45.8	+30.0
Turnout		2,669	21.3	−4.0
Rejected ballots		16		
Labour hold		Swing		

=== Crofton, Ryhill and Walton ===
Crofton, Ryhill and Walton
Party	Candidate	Votes	%	±%
Labour	Maureen Anne Cummings*	2,032	58.6	+9.5
Conservative	Connor James Clayton	904	26.1	−6.2
Yorkshire	Daniel Cochran	280	8.1	New
Green	Garry Newby	250	7.2	New
Majority		1,128	32.5	+15.7
Turnout		3,466	28.1	+0.5
Rejected ballots		16		
Labour hold		Swing		

=== Featherstone ===
Featherstone
Party	Candidate	Votes	%	±%
Labour	Graham Leslie Isherwood*	2,057	73.1	+2.1
Conservative	James Robert Hardwick	475	16.9	−12.1
Green	Ashton Victor Howick	281	10.0	New
Majority		1,582	56.2	+14.2
Turnout		2,813	21.5	+2.1
Rejected ballots		18		
Labour hold		Swing		

=== Hemsworth ===
Hemsworth
Party	Candidate	Votes	%	±%
Labour	Jakob Matthew Williamson	1,310	56.3	+18.8
Green	Lyn Morton	704	30.3	+24.0
Conservative	Liz Cowton	313	13.5	+6.9
Majority		606	26.0	
Turnout		2,327	19.3	
Rejected ballots		11		
Labour gain from Independent		Swing		

=== Horbury and South Ossett ===
Horbury and South Ossett
Party	Candidate	Votes	%	±%
Labour	Gwen Page	1,796	50.3	+17.5
Conservative	Simon John Fishwick*	1,303	36.5	−2.7
Liberal Democrats	Mark Andrew Goodair	283	7.9	−3.0
Green	Richard Hargreaves Norris	192	5.4	−3.0
Majority		493	13.8	
Turnout		3,574	30.7	
Rejected ballots		18		
Labour gain from Conservative		Swing		

=== Knottingley ===
Knottingley
Party	Candidate	Votes	%	±%
Liberal Democrats	Rachel Nadine Speak	1,398	58.6	−4.5
Labour	Theo Biddle	734	30.8	+9.5
Conservative	Eamonn Malachy Mullins	182	7.6	−0.2
Green	Ruth Alexandra Love	72	3.0	−4.8
Majority		664	27.8	
Turnout		2,386	22.8	
Rejected ballots		11		
Liberal Democrats hold		Swing		

=== Normanton ===
Normanton
Party	Candidate	Votes	%	±%
Labour	Armaan Khan	1,258	47.1	+1.5
Wakefield District Independents	Cliff Parsons	520	19.5	−21.0
Conservative	Laura Weldon	494	18.5	+4.5
Liberal Democrats	Nigel James Ebbs	225	8.4	New
Green	John Robert Clayton	175	6.5	New
Majority		738	27.6	
Turnout		2,672	20.8	
Rejected ballots		13		
Labour hold		Swing		

=== Ossett ===
Ossett
Party	Candidate	Votes	%	±%
Labour	Olivia Maria Rowley	1,531	45.5	+6.3
Independent	Deano Kitchen	670	19.9	New
Yorkshire	Simon David Watson Britcliffe	484	14.4	New
Liberal Democrats	Tony Sargeant	473	14.0	+6.8
Green	Stephen Scott	210	6.2	−4.9
Majority		861	25.6	
Turnout		3,368	27.0	
Rejected ballots		29		
Labour gain from Conservative		Swing		

=== Pontefract North ===
Pontefract North
Party	Candidate	Votes	%	±%
Labour	Hannah Ruth Appleyard	1,832	62.7	+21.3
Conservative	Christopher Robert Hyomes	464	15.9	−3.5
Yorkshire	Christopher Dawson	375	12.8	−26.4
Green	Emma Kay Tingle	151	5.2	New
Liberal Democrats	Leah Birdsall	101	3.5	New
Majority		1,368	46.8	
Turnout		2,923	20.5	
Rejected ballots		9		
Labour hold		Swing		

=== Pontefract South ===
Pontefract South
Party	Candidate	Votes	%	±%
Labour	Brian Arthur Mayhew	1,658	50.0	+3.6
Conservative	Arnie Craven	1244	37.5	−2.7
Green	Oliver Luke Watkins	164	5.0	New
Liberal Democrats	Susan Hayes	163	4.9	−8.5
SDP	Trevor Lake	84	2.5	New
Majority		414	12.5	
Turnout		3,313	28	
Rejected ballots		20		
Labour hold		Swing		

=== South Elmsall and South Kirkby ===
South Elmsall and South Kirkby
Party	Candidate	Votes	%	±%
Labour	Steve Tulley*	2,091	79.8	+4.2
Green	Stefan Arnold Ludewig	265	10.1	New
Conservative	Perpertua Ruzvidzo	265	10.1	−0.7
Majority		1826	69.7	
Turnout		2,621	19.2	
Rejected ballots		14		
Labour hold		Swing		

=== Stanley and Outwood East ===
Stanley and Outwood East
Party	Candidate	Votes	%	±%
Labour	Jack Spencer Hemingway*	2,018	55.8	+11.0
Conservative	Kully Sanghera	733	20.3	−4.2
Wakefield District Independents	Jenny Prest	336	9.3	New
Yorkshire	Brent Andrew Hawksley	273	7.5	New
Green	Richard David Copeland	223	6.2	New
TUSC	Darren Joseph Lumber	36	1.0	New
Majority		1,285	35.5	
Turnout		3,619	27.5	
Rejected ballots		8		
Labour hold		Swing		

=== Wakefield East ===
Wakefield East
Party	Candidate	Votes	%	±%
Labour	Stuart Heptinstall*	1,815	52.5	−4.4
Conservative	Muhammad Ansar Hayat	1,175	34.0	+21.8
Independent	Matt Wilson	216	6.2	New
Green	Janet Mackintosh	183	5.3	−3.6
TUSC	Mick Griffiths	70	2.0	−0.9
Majority		640	18.5	
Turnout		3,459	29.6	
Rejected ballots		14		
Labour hold		Swing		

=== Wakefield North ===
Wakefield North
Party	Candidate	Votes	%	±%
Labour	Margaret Isherwood*	1,818	61.3	+15.3
Conservative	Angela Margaret Holwell	643	21.7	+2.2
Green	Daniel Mark Russell	224	7.6	New
Yorkshire	Andy Mack	222	7.5	−2.6
TUSC	Tom Griffiths	59	2.0	New
Majority		1,175	39.6	
Turnout		2,966	24.3	
Rejected ballots		11		
Labour hold		Swing		

=== Wakefield Rural ===
Wakefield Rural
Party	Candidate	Votes	%	±%
Labour	Jordan Phillip Bryan	1,530	37.5	+4.5
Conservative	Ian John Sanders*	1516	37.2	−7.2
Yorkshire	David John Rowntree Herdson	494	12.1	New
Liberal Democrats	Mark Simon Lord	300	7.4	−1.1
Green	Karen Sadler	240	5.9	−8.3
Majority		14	0.3	
Turnout		4,080	29.9	
Rejected ballots		13		
Labour gain from Conservative		Swing		

=== Wakefield South ===
Wakefield South
Party	Candidate	Votes	%	±%
Labour	Katrina Pentland Frame Law	1,493	42.6	+14.4
Conservative	Naeem Formuli	1,424	40.6	−0.2
Wakefield District Independents	Karl Johnson*	298	8.5	−32.3
Green	Krys Tal Holmes	291	8.3	New
Majority		69	2.0	
Turnout		3,506	32.5	
Rejected ballots		13		
Labour gain from Independent		Swing		

Karl Jones had been elected as a Conservative in 2019 but left the party in February 2023 to join the Wakefield District Independents.

=== Wakefield West ===
Wakefield West
Party	Candidate	Votes	%	±%
Labour	Michael Paul Graham*	1,829	64.0	+15.7
Conservative	Nick Hannam	681	23.8	+1.7
Wakefield District Independents	Christine Mary Gill	190	6.7	New
Green	Lewis Elliott	156	5.5	New
Majority		1,148	40.2	
Turnout		2,856	25.3	
Rejected ballots		10		
Labour hold		Swing		

=== Wrenthorpe and Outwood West ===
Wrenthorpe and Outwood West
Party	Candidate	Votes	%	±%
Labour	Charlie Keith*	1,520	40.2	+6.0
Wakefield District Independents	Nic Stansby	1,120	29.7	New
Conservative	Waj Ali	614	16.3	−16.8
Liberal Democrats	Natasha De Vere	195	5.2	−2.3
Green	Oliver Thompson	175	4.6	New
Reform	David Alan Dews	153	4.1	−13.5
Majority		400	10.5	
Turnout		3,777	29.2	
Rejected ballots		5		
Labour hold		Swing		
