= 2022 Wakefield Metropolitan District Council election =

2022 UK local government election

← 2021	5 May 2022	2023 →

One third (21) of 63 seats on the Wakefield Metropolitan District Council. 32 seats needed for a majority
	First party	Second party
Leader	Denise Jeffery	N/A
Party	Labour	Conservative
Leader's seat	Castleford Central and Glasshoughton	N/A
Last election	13 seats, 45.1%	8 seats, 37.5%
Seats before	28	10
	Third party	Fourth party
Leader		Tom Gordon
Party	Independent	Liberal Democrats
Leader's seat		Knottingley
Last election	0 seats, 2.1%	2 seat, 3.0%
Seats before	2	2
- Map showing the results of the 2022 Wakefield Metropolitan District Council election
council control before election
Majority administration
Labour
Council control after election
Denise Jeffery
Labour

The 2022 Wakefield Metropolitan District Council election took place on 5 May 2022 to elect members of Wakefield Council. This was on the same day as other local elections. 21 of the 63 seats were up for election.

== Background ==
Since its first election in 1973, Labour has always controlled Wakefield Council, only falling below 60% of seats on 4 occasions (most recently in 2010). In the 2021 election, Labour lost 6 seats with 45.1% of the vote, the Conservatives gained 6 seats with 37.5%, the Liberal Democrats gained 1 with 3.0%, and independents lost 1 with 2.1%

The seats up for election this year were last elected in 2018. In that election, Labour lost 1 seat with 51.7% of the vote, the Conservatives gained 4 with 34.0%, independents lost 1 with 3.9%, and UKIP lost both their seats up for election with 1.1%.

== Previous council composition ==
After 2021 election		Before 2022 election		After 2022 election	
Party	Seats	Party	Seats	Party	Seats
Labour	43	Labour	44	Labour	45
Conservative	17	Conservative	15	Conservative	13
Liberal Democrats	2	Liberal Democrats	2	Liberal Democrats	3
Independent	1	Independent	2	Independent	2

Changes:

- December 2021: Ian Womersley (independent) joins Labour
- March 2022: Akef Akbar leaves Conservatives to sit as an independent
- Paul Stockhill leaves Conservatives to sit as an independent
- Conservative group leader Nic Stansby leaves Conservatives to sit as an independent.

== Results summary ==
Change with 2021.

2022 Wakefield Metropolitan District Council election
Party	This election			Full council			This election		
Party	Seats	Net	Seats %	Other	Total	Total %	Votes	Votes %	+/−
Labour	17	▲1	80.95	28	45	71.4	38,561	51.7	+6.6
Conservative	3	▼2	14.29	10	13	20.6	20,512	27.5	-10.0
Independent	0	Steady	0.00	2	2	3.2	4,007	5.4	+3.3
Liberal Democrats	1	▲1	4.76	2	3	4.8	3,960	5.3	+2.3
Green	0	Steady	0.00	0	0	0.0	3,641	4.9	-1.5
Yorkshire	0	Steady	0.00	0	0	0.0	3,228	4.3	-0.1
Freedom Alliance	0	Steady	0.00	0	0	0.0	369	0.5	New
Reform UK	0	Steady	0.00	0	0	0.0	160	0.2	-0.2
TUSC	0	Steady	0.00	0	0	0.0	102	0.1	0.0
SDP	0	Steady	0.00	0	0	0.0	52	0.1	New

== Ward results ==
An asterisk indicates an incumbent councillor. Changes with 2021.

=== Ackworth, North Elmsall and Upton ===
Ackworth, North Elmsall and Upton
Party	Candidate	Votes	%	±%
Labour	Allan Garbutt*	1,537	44.81	+9.61
Conservative	David Pointon	916	26.71	−9.89
Independent	Gwen Marshall	568	16.56	+12.96
Green	Jody Gabriel	288	8.40	+1.7
Freedom Alliance	Carol Higgins	121	3.53	New
Majority		621	18.10	+16.7
Turnout		3,430	25.6	−4.7
Labour hold		Swing		

=== Airedale and Ferry Fryston ===
Airedale and Ferry Fryston
Party	Candidate	Votes	%	±%
Labour	Kathryn Scott*	1,524	61.43	+10.33
Conservative	Richard Evans	541	21.81	−1.29
Independent	Neil Kennedy	311	12.54	+1.04
Liberal Democrats	Leah Birdsall	105	4.23	New
Majority		983	39.62	+11.62
Turnout		2,481	21.4	
Labour hold		Swing		

=== Altofts and Whitwood ===
Altofts and Whitwood
Party	Candidate	Votes	%	±%
Labour	Jacquie Speight*	2,053	56.49	+9.0
Conservative	Barbara Wright	809	22.26	−15.8
Independent	John Thomas	613	16.87	+11.7
Liberal Democrats	Leanne Hall	159	4.38	N/A
Majority		1,244	34.23	
Turnout		3,634		
Labour hold		Swing		

=== Castleford Central and Glasshoughton ===
Denise Jeffery is the incumbent Leader of the Council going into the election.

Castleford Central and Glasshoughton
Party	Candidate	Votes	%	±%
Labour	Denise Jeffery*	1,900	64.60	+2.2
Conservative	Joanne Smart	482	16.39	−5.4
Yorkshire	Paul Phelps	471	16.01	+4.4
Liberal Democrats	Janet Walton	88	2.99	N/A
Majority		1,418	48.21	
Turnout		2,941		
Labour hold		Swing		

=== Crofton, Ryhill and Walton ===
Crofton, Ryhill and Walton
Party	Candidate	Votes	%	±%
Labour	Usman Ali	1,832	47.70	+4.0
Conservative	Chad Thomas	1,335	34.76	−10.7
Liberal Democrats	Connor Clayton	364	9.48	N/A
Green	Garry Newby	310	8.07	−2.8
Majority		497	12.94	
Turnout		3,841		
Labour hold		Swing		

=== Featherstone ===
Dick Taylor sat as a Labour councillor, however, stood as an independent following his de-selection by the local party.

Featherstone
Party	Candidate	Votes	%	±%
Labour	Steve Vickers	2,000	60.4	−0.3
Independent	Dick Taylor*	717	21.6	N/A
Conservative	John Taylor	597	18.0	−5.1
Majority		1,283	38.8	
Turnout		3,314	25.2	
Labour hold		Swing	N/A	

=== Hemsworth ===
Hemsworth
Party	Candidate	Votes	%	±%
Labour	Melanie Jones	1,752	62.2	+18.2
Green	Lyn Morton	604	21.4	+10.0
Conservative	Eamonn Mullins	461	16.4	−3.2
Majority		1,148	40.8	
Turnout		2,817	23.5	
Labour hold		Swing	▲4.1	

=== Horbury and South Ossett ===
Horbury and South Ossett
Party	Candidate	Votes	%	±%
Labour	Deborah Nicholls	2,222	51.1	+13.0
Conservative	Gill Cruise*	1,522	35.0	−9.7
Liberal Democrats	Mark Goodair	289	6.6	+2.8
Yorkshire	Ryan Kett	183	4.2	N/A
Green	Richard Norris	131	3.0	−0.4
Majority		700	16.1	
Turnout		4,347	37.0	
Labour gain from Conservative		Swing	▲11.4	

=== Knottingley ===
Knottingley
Party	Candidate	Votes	%	±%
Liberal Democrats	Robert Girt	1,504	50.6	−3.6
Labour	Paul Green	1,216	40.9	+12.0
Conservative	Roger Kirby	254	8.5	−5.3
Majority		288	9.7	
Turnout		2,974	28.7	
Liberal Democrats gain from Labour		Swing	▼7.8	

=== Normanton ===
Isabel Owen was the Deputy Police and Crime Commissioner for West Yorkshire under Mark Burns-Williamson.

Normanton
Party	Candidate	Votes	%	±%
Labour	Isabel Owen	1,735	56.8	+5.0
Conservative	James Hardwick	697	22.8	−8.2
Independent	Cliff Parsons	280	9.2	+2.1
Liberal Democrats	Deborah Goodall	183	6.0	+3.3
Green	John Clayton	161	5.3	−0.9
Majority		1,038	34.0	
Turnout		3,056	23.8	
Labour hold		Swing	▲6.6	

=== Ossett ===
Ossett
Party	Candidate	Votes	%	±%
Conservative	Nick Farmer*	1,818	42.7	−11.1
Labour Co-op	Armaan Khan	1,610	37.9	−0.9
Liberal Democrats	Tony Sargeant	333	7.8	+5.3
Yorkshire	Deborah Dawson	317	7.5	N/A
Green	Stephen Scott	175	4.1	−0.8
Majority		208	4.8	
Turnout		4,253	33.7	
Conservative hold		Swing	▼5.1	

=== Pontefract North ===
Pontefract North
Party	Candidate	Votes	%	±%
Labour	Clive Tennant*	1,718	52.0	+5.9
Conservative	Christopher Hyomes	655	19.8	−11.4
Yorkshire	Chris Dawson	562	17.0	−0.5
Green	Emma Tingle	255	7.7	+2.6
Liberal Democrats	Sheila Atha	116	3.5	N/A
Majority		1,063	17.3	
Turnout		3,306	23.2	
Labour hold		Swing	▲8.7	

=== Pontefract South ===
Pontefract South
Party	Candidate	Votes	%	±%
Labour	George Ayre*	2,082	54.3	+12.8
Conservative	Stephanie Fishwick	1,305	34.0	−10.7
Yorkshire	James Craven	262	6.8	−2.7
Liberal Democrats	Susan Hayes	133	3.5	N/A
SDP	Trevor Lake	52	1.4	N/A
Majority		777	20.3	
Turnout		3,834	32.2	
Labour hold		Swing	▲11.8	

=== South Elmsall and South Kirkby ===
South Elmsall and South Kirkby
Party	Candidate	Votes	%	±%
Labour	Stan Bates	1,851	60.6	−0.2
Independent	Nikky Stevens	596	19.5	N/A
Conservative	Pepe Ruzvidzo	445	14.6	−10.4
Green	Stefan Ludewig	164	5.4	+0.7
Majority		1,255	41.1	
Turnout		3,056	22.5	
Labour hold		Swing	N/A	

=== Stanley and Outwood East ===
Lynn Masterman is a former Labour councillor for Ossett ward before losing in the 2021 election.

Stanley and Outwood East
Party	Candidate	Votes	%	±%
Labour	Lynn Masterman	2,139	54.0	+3.9
Conservative	Gideon Harvey	1,122	28.3	−7.6
Yorkshire	Brent Hawksley	326	8.2	+1.1
Green	Richard Copeland	226	5.7	+1.1
Liberal Democrats	Malcolm Pollack	146	3.7	+1.4
Majority		1,017	25.7	
Turnout		3,959	30.4	
Labour hold		Swing	▲5.8	

=== Wakefield East ===
Wakefield East
Party	Candidate	Votes	%	±%
Labour	Yubi Ayub	2,503	69.8	+25.3
Conservative	Nick Hannam	616	17.2	−28.6
Green	Janet MacKintosh	237	6.6	±0.0
Freedom Alliance	Michael Dodgson	128	3.6	N/A
TUSC	Michael Griffiths	102	2.8	−0.3
Majority		1,887	52.6	
Turnout		3,586	30.9	
Labour hold		Swing	▲27.0	

=== Wakefield North ===
Wakefield North
Party	Candidate	Votes	%	±%
Labour	David Pickersgill	2,139	60.7	+13.8
Conservative	Naeem Formuli	817	23.2	−9.8
Yorkshire	Andy Mack	222	6.3	−0.9
Green	Dan Russell	199	5.6	−3.2
Liberal Democrats	Mary Macqueen	146	4.1	N/A
Majority		1,322	37.5	
Turnout		3,523	29.3	
Labour hold		Swing	▲11.8	

=== Wakefield Rural ===
Wakefield Rural
Party	Candidate	Votes	%	±%
Conservative	Samantha Harvey*	2,347	47.0	−11.8
Labour	Jordan Bryan	1,838	36.8	+6.8
Yorkshire	David Herdson	428	8.6	N/A
Green	Karen Sadler	314	6.3	−4.9
Freedom Alliance	Lien Davies	69	1.4	N/A
Majority		509	10.2	
Turnout		4,996	36.4	
Conservative hold		Swing	▼9.3	

=== Wakefield South ===
Wakefield South
Party	Candidate	Votes	%	±%
Conservative	Nadeem Ahmed*	1,836	46.7	−3.5
Labour	Paul Belbin	1,533	39.0	+2.3
Yorkshire	Dan Cochran	212	5.4	−0.9
Green	Krys Holmes	203	5.2	−1.6
Liberal Democrats	Nigel Ebbs	151	3.8	N/A
Majority		303	7.7	
Turnout		3,935	36.5	
Conservative hold		Swing	▼2.9	

=== Wakefield West ===
Wakefield West
Party	Candidate	Votes	%	±%
Labour	Kevin Swift*	1,770	55.5	+6.3
Conservative	Laura Weldon	905	28.4	−12.0
Yorkshire	Richard Bentley	245	7.7	N/A
Green	Lewis Elliott	157	4.9	−2.6
Liberal Democrats	Carol Girt-Wilson	61	1.9	N/A
Freedom Alliance	Gaynor Haycock	51	1.6	N/A
Majority		865	27.1	
Turnout		3,189	28.4	
Labour hold		Swing	▲9.2	

=== Wrenthorpe and Outwood West ===
Nic Stansby was the Leader of the Conservative group before being de-selected by her local branch. Waj Ali is a former Brexit Party member and candidate.

Wrenthorpe and Outwood West
Party	Candidate	Votes	%	±%
Labour	Nadiah Sharp	1,607	39.0	−0.4
Conservative	Waj Ali	1,032	25.0	−18.5
Independent	Nic Stansby*	922	22.4	New
Reform UK	David Dews	160	3.9	+0.8 '"`UNIQ−−ref−00000076−QINU`"'
Green	Oliver Thompson	220	5.3	−1.1
Liberal Democrats	Natasha de Vere	182	4.4	New
Majority		575	14.0	+9.9
Turnout		4,123	31.6	−2.0
Labour gain from Conservative		Swing	9.05	

== See also ==
- 2022 Wakefield by-election
