= 2000 Wakefield Metropolitan District Council election =

2000 UK local government election

The 2000 Wakefield Metropolitan District Council election took place on 4 May 2000 to elect members of Wakefield Metropolitan District Council in West Yorkshire, England. One third of the council was up for election and the Labour party kept overall control of the council.

After the election, the composition of the council was

- Labour 55
- Conservative 6
- Liberal Democrat 1
- Independent 1

== Election result ==
Wakefield local election result 2000
Party	Seats	Gains	Losses	Net gain/loss	Seats %	Votes %	Votes	+/−
Labour	16	1	4	-3	76.2	51.2	26,687	
Conservative	4	3	0	+3	19.0	32.0	16,673	
Liberal Democrats	1	1	0	+1	4.8	10.9	5,695	
Independent	0	0	1	-1	0	4.2	2,209	
Socialist Labour	0	0	0	0	0	1.6	851	

== Ward results ==
Castleford Ferry Fryston
Party	Candidate	Votes	%	±%
Labour	Graham Phelps	1,068	58.4	
Independent	John Bird	614	33.6	
Conservative	Madge Richards	148	8.1	
Majority		454	24.8	
Turnout		1,830	19.6	
Labour hold		Swing		

Castleford Glasshoughton
Party	Candidate	Votes	%	±%
Labour	Anthony Wallis	1,383	76.5	
Conservative	Charles Scholes	278	15.4	
Socialist Labour	Angela Herbert	148	8.2	
Majority		1,105	61.1	
Turnout		1,809	17.4	
Labour hold		Swing		

Castleford Whitwood
Party	Candidate	Votes	%	±%
Labour	Darran Travis	1,498	77.3	
Conservative	Norma Crossely	300	15.5	
Socialist Labour	Zane Carpenter	140	7.2	
Majority		1,198	61.8	
Turnout		1,938	20.1	
Labour hold		Swing		

Crofton & Ackworth
Party	Candidate	Votes	%	±%
Labour	Chris Heinitz	1,212	48.6	
Conservative	Michael Ledgard	707	28.4	
Liberal Democrats	James McDougall	573	23.0	
Majority		505	20.2	
Turnout		2,492	21.0	
Labour hold		Swing		

Featherstone
Party	Candidate	Votes	%	±%
Labour	David Bond	1,329	54.4	
Featherstone Labour 1st	Stephen Vickers	798	32.6	
Conservative	Brigid Hopkins	318	13.0	
Majority		531	21.8	
Turnout		2,445	22.8	
Labour gain from Independent		Swing		

Hemsworth
Party	Candidate	Votes	%	±%
Labour	Albert Manifield	1,280	74.8	
Conservative	Eamonn Mullins	432	25.2	
Majority		848	49.6	
Turnout		1,712	16.1	
Labour hold		Swing		

Horbury
Party	Candidate	Votes	%	±%
Conservative	Graham Smith	1,416	45.0	
Labour	Philip McNeil	1,020	32.4	
Liberal Democrats	Mark Goodair	710	22.6	
Majority		396	12.6	
Turnout		3,146	26.5	
Conservative gain from Labour		Swing		

Knottingley
Party	Candidate	Votes	%	±%
Labour	Glenn Burton	1,338	71.5	
Conservative	Timothy Allerton	533	28.5	
Majority		805	43.0	
Turnout		1,871	17.8	
Labour hold		Swing		

Normanton & Sharlston
Party	Candidate	Votes	%	±%
Labour	John McGowan	1,405	61.3	
Conservative	Neil Webster	452	19.7	
Socialist Labour	Thomas Appleyard	436	19.0	
Majority		953	41.6	
Turnout		2,293	19.1	
Labour hold		Swing		

Ossett
Party	Candidate	Votes	%	±%
Liberal Democrats	Alec Metcalfe	1,135	36.3	
Labour	Aynur Rigby	1,103	35.2	
Conservative	Jane Brown	893	28.5	
Majority		32	1.1	
Turnout		3,131	25.1	
Liberal Democrats gain from Labour		Swing		

Pontefract North
Party	Candidate	Votes	%	±%
Labour	David Grason	1,453	71.1	
Conservative	June Drysdale	590	28.9	
Majority		863	42.2	
Turnout		2,043	16.8	
Labour hold		Swing		

Pontefract South
Party	Candidate	Votes	%	±%
Labour	Anthony Dean	1,250	48.6	
Conservative	Richard Molloy	1,023	39.8	
Liberal Democrats	David Arthur	297	11.6	
Majority		227	8.8	
Turnout		2,570	24.2	
Labour hold		Swing		

South Elmsall
Party	Candidate	Votes	%	±%
Labour	Dean Taylor	1,290	70.7	
Conservative	Ian Hall	534	29.3	
Majority		756	41.4	
Turnout		1,824	16.3	
Labour hold		Swing		

South Kirkby
Party	Candidate	Votes	%	±%
Labour	Laurie Harrison	1,286	63.1	
Independent Labour	Eric Tunstall	530	26.0	
Conservative	John Alexander	223	10.9	
Majority		756	37.1	
Turnout		2,039	19.2	
Labour hold		Swing		

Stanley & Altofts
Party	Candidate	Votes	%	±%
Labour	Clive Hudson	1,354	48.6	
Conservative	Caroline Sheen	783	28.1	
Liberal Democrats	Michael Burch	651	23.4	
Majority		571	20.5	
Turnout		2,788	20.1	
Labour hold		Swing		

Stanley & Wrenthorpe
Party	Candidate	Votes	%	±%
Labour	Philip Dobson	1,435	45.1	
Conservative	Christian Hazell	1,181	37.1	
Liberal Democrats	Margaret Dodd	566	17.8	
Majority		254	8.0	
Turnout		3,182	21.4	
Labour hold		Swing		

Wakefield Central
Party	Candidate	Votes	%	±%
Conservative	John Walker	1,183	42.4	
Labour	Janet Deighton	1,179	42.2	
Liberal Democrats	Susan Morgan	303	10.9	
Socialist Labour	Paul Turek	127	4.5	
Majority		4	0.2	
Turnout		2,792	24.2	
Conservative gain from Labour		Swing		

Wakefield East
Party	Candidate	Votes	%	±%
Labour	Robert Mitchell	1,503	54.3	
Conservative	Paul Harvey	716	25.9	
Liberal Democrats	Alan Dale	329	11.9	
Save our Services	Michael Griffiths	220	7.9	
Majority		787	28.4	
Turnout		2,768	22.7	
Labour hold		Swing		

Wakefield North
Party	Candidate	Votes	%	±%
Labour	Melvyn Taylor	1,253	52.4	
Conservative	Michael Mitchell	786	32.9	
Liberal Democrats	Douglas Dale	351	14.7	
Majority		467	19.5	
Turnout		2,390	21.4	
Labour hold		Swing		

Wakefield Rural
Party	Candidate	Votes	%	±%
Conservative	Bryan Denson	1,606	51.7	
Labour	Maureen Cummings	1,134	36.5	
Liberal Democrats	David Neale	368	11.8	
Majority		472	15.2	
Turnout		3,108	24.6	
Conservative gain from Labour		Swing		

Wakefield South
Party	Candidate	Votes	%	±%
Conservative	Brian Hazell	2,571	65.2	
Labour	John Garrod	914	23.2	
Liberal Democrats	Stephen Nuthall	412	10.4	
Independent	Stephen Selby	47	1.2	
Majority		1,657	42.0	
Turnout		3,944	32.4	
Conservative hold		Swing		
