= 1998 Wakefield Metropolitan District Council election =

1998 UK local government election

The 1998 Wakefield Metropolitan District Council election took place on 7 May 1998 to elect members of Wakefield Metropolitan District Council in West Yorkshire, England. One-third of the council was up for election and the Labour party kept overall control of the council.

After the election, the composition of the council was

- Labour 59
- Conservative 2
- Independent 1
- Vacant 1

== Election result ==
Wakefield local election result 1998
Party	Seats	Gains	Losses	Net gain/loss	Seats %	Votes %	Votes	+/−
Labour	18			-1	90.0			
Conservative	1			0	5.0			
Independent	1			+1	5.0			
