= 2004 Wakefield Metropolitan District Council election =

2004 UK local government election

Results of the 2004 Wakefield Metropolitan District Council election

The 2004 Wakefield Metropolitan District Council election took place on 10 June 2004 to elect members of Wakefield Metropolitan District Council in West Yorkshire, England. The whole council was up for election with boundary changes since the last election in 2003. The Labour Party stayed in overall control of the council.

== Campaign ==
Before the election Labour held 50 of the 63 seats on the council and this was seen as being an insurmountable majority for the other parties. However the Conservatives stood a full slate of 63 candidates and were hopeful of making gains due to dissatisfaction among Labour supporters. The British National Party stood 12 candidates in the election, a substantial increase on the 2 they had stood in the 2003 election but not the 20 candidates the party had been hoping to stand. Other candidates included 19 Liberal Democrats, 18 independents, 5 Socialist Alternative, 3 from the United Kingdom Independence Party and 1 Green Party. All postal voting in the election was expected to increase turnout, which was seen by analysts as making the results difficult to predict.

== Election results ==
The results saw Labour lose 7 seats but remained firmly in control of the council with 43 of the 63 seats. The Conservatives gained 4 and the independents 3, with the gains for the independents in Featherstone being put down to the closure of a local swimming pool. The Liberal Democrats held their 3 seats in Ossett but neither they nor the British National Party made any gains. Overall voter turnout was 39.6%.

Labour saw the results as not being as bad as they could have been given the losses the party was suffering nationally, which was put down to improved services and listening to local people. Meanwhile, the Conservatives were disappointed that they had not made more gains.

Wakefield local election result 2004
Party	Seats	Gains	Losses	Net gain/loss	Seats %	Votes %	Votes	+/−
Labour	43			-7	68.3	45.7	108,222	-0.4
Conservative	11			+4	17.5	29.8	70,679	+4.5
Independent	6			+3	9.5	9.9	23,475	-1.6
Liberal Democrats	3			0	4.8	8.3	19,719	-2.9
BNP	0			0	0.0	4.0	9,492	+1.6
UKIP	0			0	0.0	1.1	2,601	-0.4
Socialist Alternative	0			0	0.0	0.6	1,538	+0.0
Green	0			0	0.0	0.5	1,111	+0.5

== Ward results ==
Ackworth, North Elmsall and Upton
Party	Candidate	Votes	%	±%
Labour	Allan Garbutt	1,951		
Labour	Alan Bell	1,526		
Labour	Linda Broom	1,362		
Liberal Democrats	James McDougall	1,259		
Conservative	Keith Wilson	1,241		
Conservative	Katie Denson	1,060		
Conservative	Sheila Scholes	1,021		
Independent	John Evans	974		
Liberal Democrats	Kenneth Ridgway	784		
Liberal Democrats	Margaret Dodd	725		
Turnout		11,903	38.6	

Airedale and Ferry Fryston
Party	Candidate	Votes	%	±%
Labour	Graham Phelps	2,025		
Labour	Yvonne Crewe	1,811		
Labour	Stephen Groves	1,751		
Independent	John Bird	997		
Liberal Democrats	Paul Kirby	679		
Conservative	Mary Barton	469		
Conservative	Pamela Ledgard	418		
Conservative	Rodney Williams	409		
Turnout		8,559	34.0	

Altofts and Whitwood
Party	Candidate	Votes	%	±%
Labour	Peter Box	1,993		
Labour	Heather Hudson	1,939		
Labour	Darran Travis	1,855		
Liberal Democrats	Michael Burch	876		
BNP	William Draper	701		
Liberal Democrats	Simon Curtis	700		
Conservative	Allen Glendinning	625		
Conservative	Tom Dixon	584		
Liberal Democrats	Carey Chambers	566		
Conservative	Jean Molloy	559		
Turnout		10,398	38.0	

Castleford Central and Glasshoughton
Party	Candidate	Votes	%	±%
Labour	Mark Burns-Williamson	2,797		
Labour	Anthony Wallis	2,692		
Labour	Denise Jeffery	2,286		
BNP	Rita Robinson	948		
Conservative	Stanley Hick	507		
Conservative	Val Moorey	484		
Conservative	Joan Revitt	483		
Turnout		10,197	36.7	

Crofton, Ryhill and Walton
Party	Candidate	Votes	%	±%
Labour	Albert Manifield	1,995		
Labour	Maureen Cummings	1,757		
Labour	Graham Isherwood	1,729		
Independent	Christopher Hazell	1,436		
Independent	Nicholas Hazell	1,265		
Conservative	Michael Ledgard	1,261		
Conservative	Allan Couch	1,058		
Conservative	Alan West	937		
BNP	Robert Jaques	815		
Turnout		12,253	43.8	

Featherstone
Party	Candidate	Votes	%	±%
Independent	Kay Binnersley	2,356		
Independent	Pauline Guy	2,143		
Independent	Roy Bickerton	1,859		
Labour	Margaret Isherwood	1,771		
Labour	David Bond	1,703		
Labour	Robin Tuffs	1,583		
BNP	David Lumb	685		
Conservative	Phyllis Brake	322		
Conservative	Jean Yarwood	312		
Conservative	Brigid Hopkins	308		
Turnout		13,042	41.2	

Hemsworth
Party	Candidate	Votes	%	±%
Labour	Glyn Lloyd	2,613		
Labour	Wayne Jenkins	2,256		
Labour	Hazel Chowcat	2,019		
Conservative	Rebecca Mullins	712		
Conservative	Alfred Hall	661		
Conservative	Norma Crossley	654		
BNP	Ian Kitchen	508		
Turnout		9,423	34.1	

Horbury and South Ossett
Party	Candidate	Votes	%	±%
Labour	Janet Holmes	1,724		
Labour	Brian Holmes	1,621		
Conservative	Graham Smith	1,578		
Conservative	Caroline Smith	1,507		
Conservative	Roger Robinson	1,452		
Liberal Democrats	Mark Goodair	1,245		
Labour	Robert Kirk	1,228		
Liberal Democrats	David Rowland	1,176		
BNP	John Aveyard	978		
Liberal Democrats	Edmund Marshall	929		
Independent	Mark Harrop	452		
Turnout		13,890	45.4	

Knottingley
Party	Candidate	Votes	%	±%
Labour	Graham Stokes	1,946		
Labour	Glenn Burton	1,734		
Labour	Patricia Doyle	1,657		
Conservative	Christopher Burns	892		
BNP	Mark Burton	831		
Conservative	Michael Plumbley	695		
Conservative	Madge Richards	587		
Turnout		8,342	35.3	

Normanton
Party	Candidate	Votes	%	±%
Labour	Barry Smith	2,105		
Independent	Graeme Milner	1,694		
Labour	Peter Loosemore	1,627		
Labour	Christine Sharman	1,463		
Conservative	Sue Mountain	877		
Conservative	Betty Charlesworth	611		
Conservative	John Scollan	555		
Turnout		8,932	33.1	

Ossett
Party	Candidate	Votes	%	±%
Liberal Democrats	Alec Metcalfe	2,312		
Liberal Democrats	Elizabeth Knowles	2,067		
Liberal Democrats	Peter Walker	1,975		
Labour	Donald Hitchen	1,220		
Labour	David Watts	1,174		
Labour	Paul McCartan	1,143		
Conservative	John Smith	958		
BNP	Suzy Cass	945		
Conservative	Jane Garfit	801		
Conservative	Andrew Garfit	791		
Turnout		13,386	43.1	

Pontefract North
Party	Candidate	Votes	%	±%
Labour	Jack Kershaw	2,008		
Labour	Patricia Garbutt	1,716		
Labour	Clive Tennant	1,599		
UKIP	Stephanie Wilder	994		
UKIP	Howard Burdon	848		
Conservative	Geoffrey Walsh	838		
Conservative	Eamonn Mullins	838		
Conservative	Catherine Campbell-Reitzik	783		
Socialist Alternative	John Gill	232		
Turnout		9,856	35.6	

Pontefract South
Party	Candidate	Votes	%	±%
Labour	Trevor Izon	2,474		
Conservative	Philip Booth	2,464		
Labour	James Nicholson	2,374		
Conservative	Richard Molloy	2,103		
Labour	Sylvia Burton	2,059		
Conservative	David Howarth	1,963		
BNP	David Redfearn	651		
Turnout		14,088	46.0	

South Elmsall and South Kirkby
Party	Candidate	Votes	%	±%
Labour	Mollie Wright	2,414		
Independent	Harold Mills	2,162		
Labour	Laurie Harrison	1,898		
Labour	John Evans	1,884		
BNP	Linda Westwood	853		
Liberal Democrats	Christopher Wright	832		
Conservative	Christian l'Anson	495		
Conservative	David Charlesworth	335		
Conservative	Patricia Foster	327		
Turnout		11,200	37.3	

Stanley and Outwood East
Party	Candidate	Votes	%	±%
Labour	David Atkinson	2,156		
Labour	Clive Hudson	1,686		
Labour	Jacqueline Williams	1,645		
Conservative	Elizabeth Hick	1,640		
Conservative	David Barton	1,594		
Conservative	Charles Scholes	1,498		
Turnout		10,219	36.2	

Wakefield East
Party	Candidate	Votes	%	±%
Labour	Hilary Mitchell	1,559		
Labour	Ronald Halliday	1,466		
Labour	Olivia Rowley	1,434		
Independent	Meherban Khan	1,024		
Conservative	Donald Saunders	874		
Conservative	Terence Brown	763		
Conservative	John Berry	732		
BNP	Michael Wain	620		
Socialist Alternative	Michael Griffiths	436		
Turnout		8,908	37.2	

Wakefield North
Party	Candidate	Votes	%	±%
Labour	Elizabeth Rhodes	1,434		
Labour	Melvyn Taylor	1,360		
Labour	Keith Rhodes	1,316		
Conservative	Jane Brown	1,105		
Conservative	Angela Holwell	1,022		
Conservative	Patrick Williams	1,000		
Liberal Democrats	Douglas Dale	902		
UKIP	Keith Wells	759		
Socialist Alternative	Adrian O'Malley	351		
Socialist Alternative	Diane Shepherd	297		
Socialist Alternative	Robert Crabb	222		
Turnout		9,768	38.6	

Wakefield Rural
Party	Candidate	Votes	%	±%
Conservative	Paul Harvey	2,614		
Conservative	Bryan Denson	2,440		
Conservative	June Drysdale	2,374		
Labour	Martyn Johnson	1,549		
Labour	Matthew Morley	1,448		
Labour	David Dagger	1,354		
Independent	Michael Greensmith	1,123		
Green	John Lumb	1,111		
Turnout		14,013	42.0	

Wakefield South
Party	Candidate	Votes	%	±%
Conservative	David Hopkins	1,955		
Conservative	Monica Graham	1,745		
Independent	Norman Hazell	1,671		
Conservative	Nadeem Ahmed	1,452		
Independent	Brian Hazell	1,197		
Independent	Christian Hazell	999		
Labour	Richard Hayward	992		
Liberal Democrats	Stephen Nuthall	950		
Labour	John Anderson	878		
Liberal Democrats	Jack Smith	793		
Labour	Fred Walker	787		
Independent	Georgina Fenton	317		
Turnout		13,736	48.8	

Wakefield West
Party	Candidate	Votes	%	±%
Conservative	John Walker	2,637		
Conservative	William Sanders	2,586		
Conservative	John Colley	2,491		
Labour	Janet Deighton	1,620		
Labour	John Devine	1,218		
Labour	Paul Phelps	1,133		
Liberal Democrats	Susan Morgan	949		
Turnout		12,634	44.0	

Wrenthorpe and Outwood West
Party	Candidate	Votes	%	±%
Conservative	Antony Calvert	1,852		
Labour	Philip Dobson	1,719		
Labour	David Lund	1,552		
Conservative	Glenn Armitage	1,496		
Labour	Rosaline Lund	1,434		
Conservative	Tony Ayoade	1,274		
BNP	Grant Rowe	957		
Independent	Alexander Adie	952		
Independent	Robert Baulch	854		
Turnout		12,090	43.2	
