= 1999 Wakefield Metropolitan District Council election =

1999 UK local government election

The 1999 Wakefield Metropolitan District Council election took place on 6 May 1999 to elect members of Wakefield Metropolitan District Council in West Yorkshire, England. One third of the council was up for election and the Labour party kept overall control of the council.

The election saw one of the Labour councillors challenged by her own son, who stood as an independent Labour candidate.

After the election, the composition of the council was

- Labour 57
- Conservative 3
- Independent 3

== Election result ==
Wakefield local election result 1999
Party	Seats	Gains	Losses	Net gain/loss	Seats %	Votes %	Votes	+/−
Labour	20			-1	95.2			
Conservative	1			+1	4.8			
