= 2002 Wakefield Metropolitan District Council election =

Metropolitan Council District election in West Yorkshire, England

The 2002 Wakefield Metropolitan District Council election took place on 2 May 2002 to elect members of Wakefield Metropolitan District Council in West Yorkshire, England. One third of the council was up for election and the Labour party kept overall control of the council.

After the election, the composition of the council was

- Labour 53
- Conservative 5
- Independent 3
- Liberal Democrat 2

== Campaign ==
Before the election the council had 55 Labour, 4 Conservative, 3 Independent and 1 Liberal Democrat members. Each of the Labour and Conservative parties stood candidates in all 21 wards, along with 11 Liberal Democrats and 15 other candidates from various parties. Labour were defending 20 seats in the election, with two seats being contested in Pontefract South due to the resignation of a councillor, while the other 2 seats were held by independents. One of the 2 independents who was defending his seat in Wakefield South was Norman Hazell, a former leader of the Conservatives in Wakefield, who had defected from the party in 2001.

During the campaign an investigation was started by West Yorkshire Police after allegations of fraud in South Kirkby ward. Here over a quarter of the 900 postal vote applications had been found to be invalid.

== Election result ==
The Labour party remained firmly in control of the council and were pleased with only losing 2 seats in the election. The Conservatives gained Wakefield Rural, while the Liberal Democrats took Ossett. Meanwhile, both independents held their seats, with Norman Hazell's defence of Wakefield South as an independent being seen as a surprise result. Overall turnout in the election was 23.5%.

Wakefield local election result 2002
Party	Seats	Gains	Losses	Net gain/loss	Seats %	Votes %	Votes	+/−
Labour	18	0	2	-2	81.8	53.5	34,330	+2.3%
Independent	2	0	0	0	9.1	6.0	3,852	+1.8%
Conservative	1	1	0	+1	4.5	24.7	15,817	-7.3%
Liberal Democrats	1	1	0	+1	4.5	11.4	7,337	+0.5%
Socialist Labour	0	0	0	0	0	2.9	1,831	+1.3%
Socialist Alternative	0	0	0	0	0	0.6	386	+0.6%
UKIP	0	0	0	0	0	0.5	313	+0.5%
Socialist Alliance	0	0	0	0	0	0.4	285	+0.4%

== Ward results ==
Castleford Ferry Fryston
Party	Candidate	Votes	%	±%
Labour	Stephen Groves	1,404	75.6	+17.2
Conservative	Madge Richards	267	14.4	+6.3
Socialist Labour	Trevor Holderson	186	10.0	+10.0
Majority		1,137	61.2	+36.4
Turnout		1,857	19.4	−0.2
Labour hold		Swing		

Castleford Glasshoughton
Party	Candidate	Votes	%	±%
Labour	Mark Burns-Williamson	1,864	82.1	+5.6
Conservative	Charles Scholes	255	11.2	−4.2
Socialist Labour	Angela Herbert	152	6.7	−1.5
Majority		1,609	70.9	+9.8
Turnout		2,271	21.2	+3.8
Labour hold		Swing		

Castleford Whitwood
Party	Candidate	Votes	%	±%
Labour	Colin Churm	1,812	82.9	+5.6
Conservative	Jean Molloy	237	10.8	−4.7
Socialist Labour	Mary Appleyard	137	6.3	−0.9
Majority		1,575	72.1	+10.3
Turnout		2,186	22.1	+2.0
Labour hold		Swing		

Crofton & Ackworth
Party	Candidate	Votes	%	±%
Labour	Paul Beckett	1,564	51.2	+2.6
Liberal Democrats	James McDougall	669	21.9	−1.1
Conservative	Catherine Campbell-Reitzik	554	18.1	−10.3
UKIP	Howard Burden	194	6.3	+6.3
Socialist Labour	David Bruce	76	2.5	+2.5
Majority		895	29.3	+9.1
Turnout		3,057	25.4	+4.4
Labour hold		Swing		

Featherstone
Party	Candidate	Votes	%	±%
Labour	Robin Tuffs	1,867	83.0	+28.6
Conservative	Elizabeth Hick	383	17.0	+4.0
Majority		1,484	66.0	+44.2
Turnout		2,250	20.4	−2.4
Labour hold		Swing		

Hemsworth
Party	Candidate	Votes	%	±%
Labour	Wayne Jenkins	1,629	72.5	−2.3
Conservative	Eamonn Mullins	372	16.5	−8.7
Socialist Labour	Maurice Kent	247	11.0	+11.0
Majority		1,257	56.0	+6.4
Turnout		2,248	20.8	+2.7
Labour hold		Swing		

Horbury
Party	Candidate	Votes	%	±%
Labour	Brian Holmes	1,408	43.2	+10.8
Conservative	Caroline Sheen	1,225	37.6	−7.4
Liberal Democrats	Mark Goodair	567	17.4	−5.2
Socialist Labour	Karen Bruce	60	1.8	+1.8
Majority		183	5.6	
Turnout		3,260	27.0	+0.5
Labour hold		Swing		

Knottingley
Party	Candidate	Votes	%	±%
Labour	Graham Stokes	1,667	75.9	+4.4
Conservative	David Howarth	530	24.1	−4.4
Majority		1,137	51.8	+8.8
Turnout		2,197	20.7	+2.9
Labour hold		Swing		

Normanton & Sharlston
Party	Candidate	Votes	%	±%
Labour	Peter Loosemore	1,306	49.8	−11.5
Independent	Graeme Milner	665	25.3	+25.3
Conservative	Allan Couch	346	13.2	−6.5
Socialist Labour	Mick Appleyard	308	11.7	−7.3
Majority		641	24.5	−17.1
Turnout		2,625	20.6	+1.5
Labour hold		Swing		

Ossett
Party	Candidate	Votes	%	±%
Liberal Democrats	Peter Walker	2,138	54.9	+18.6
Labour	Maureen Cummings	1,235	31.7	−3.5
Conservative	Terence Brown	518	13.3	−15.2
Majority		903	23.2	+22.1
Turnout		3,891	31.1	+6.0
Liberal Democrats gain from Labour		Swing		

Pontefract North
Party	Candidate	Votes	%	±%
Labour	Jack Kershaw	1,875	68.2	−2.9
Conservative	Richard Molloy	638	23.2	−5.7
Socialist Alternative	John Gill	134	4.9	+4.9
Socialist Labour	Zane Carpenter	103	3.7	+3.7
Majority		1,237	45.0	+2.8
Turnout		2,750	21.0	+4.2
Labour hold		Swing		

Pontefract South (2)
Party	Candidate	Votes	%	±%
Labour	Trevor Izon	1,581		
Labour	Martyn Ward	1,317		
Conservative	Ian Bloomer	1,250		
Conservative	Philip Booth	1,243		
Socialist Alliance	Carol Ives	285		
Turnout		5,676	28.4	+4.2
Labour hold		Swing		
Labour hold		Swing		

South Elmsall
Party	Candidate	Votes	%	±%
Labour	John Devine	1,655	68.1	−2.6
Conservative	Ian Hall	438	18.0	−11.3
Liberal Democrats	Mary Neale	339	13.9	+13.9
Majority		1,217	50.1	+8.7
Turnout		2,432	21.2	+4.9
Labour hold		Swing		

South Kirkby
Party	Candidate	Votes	%	±%
Independent	Harold Mills	1,288	49.9	+49.9
Labour	Malcolm Evans	1,167	45.2	−17.9
Conservative	Michael Ledgard	128	5.0	−5.9
Majority		121	4.7	
Turnout		2,583	24.1	+4.9
Independent hold		Swing		

Stanley & Altofts
Party	Candidate	Votes	%	±%
Labour	David Atkinson	1,670	51.9	+3.3
Conservative	Norma Crossley	750	23.3	−4.8
Liberal Democrats	Michael Burch	715	22.2	−1.2
Socialist Labour	Kathryn Summerscales	83	2.6	+2.6
Majority		920	28.6	+8.1
Turnout		3,218	23.1	+3.0
Labour hold		Swing		

Stanley & Wrenthorpe
Party	Candidate	Votes	%	±%
Labour	Rosaline Lund	1,655	46.0	+0.9
Conservative	James Dick	1,131	31.4	−5.7
Liberal Democrats	Margaret Dodd	813	22.6	+4.8
Majority		524	14.6	+6.6
Turnout		3,599	24.0	+2.6
Labour hold		Swing		

Wakefield Central
Party	Candidate	Votes	%	±%
Labour	Antony Richardson	1,758	48.9	+6.7
Conservative	Jane Brown	1,396	38.9	−3.5
Liberal Democrats	Susan Morgan	376	10.5	−0.4
Socialist Labour	Paul Turek	62	1.7	−2.8
Majority		362	10.0	
Turnout		3,592	38.5	+14.3
Labour hold		Swing		

Wakefield East
Party	Candidate	Votes	%	±%
Labour	Olivia Rowley	1,533	45.4	−8.9
Conservative	John Berry	552	16.4	−9.5
Socialist Labour	Abdul Aziz	417	12.4	+12.4
Independent	Georgina Fenton	324	9.6	+9.6
Liberal Democrats	Alan Dale	298	8.8	−3.1
Socialist Alternative	Michael Griffiths	252	7.5	+7.5
Majority		981	29.0	+0.6
Turnout		3,376	26.6	+3.9
Labour hold		Swing		

Wakefield North
Party	Candidate	Votes	%	±%
Labour	Keith Rhodes	1,562	55.8	+3.4
Conservative	Michael Mitchell	674	24.1	−8.8
Liberal Democrats	Douglas Dale	442	15.8	+1.1
UKIP	Keith Wells	119	4.3	+4.3
Majority		888	31.7	+12.2
Turnout		2,797	24.8	+3.4
Labour hold		Swing		

Wakefield Rural
Party	Candidate	Votes	%	±%
Conservative	Paul Harvey	1,566	43.6	−8.1
Labour	John Newsome	1,536	42.8	+6.3
Liberal Democrats	David Neale	486	13.5	+1.7
Majority		30	0.8	−14.4
Turnout		3,588	27.9	+3.3
Conservative gain from Labour		Swing		

Wakefield South
Party	Candidate	Votes	%	±%
Independent	Norman Hazell	1,575	33.5	+32.3
Conservative	Christian L'Anson	1,364	29.0	−36.2
Labour	Hazel Chowcat	1,265	26.9	+3.7
Liberal Democrats	Stephen Nuthall	494	10.5	+0.1
Majority		211	4.5	
Turnout		4,698	38.0	+5.6
Independent hold		Swing		
