= 2011 Wakefield Metropolitan District Council election =

2011 English municipal election

2011 local election results in Wakefield

The 2011 Wakefield Metropolitan District Council election took place on 5 May 2011 to elect members of Wakefield Metropolitan District Council in West Yorkshire, England. One third of the council was up for election and the Labour Party stayed in overall control of the council with an increased majority. After the election, the composition of the council was:

Party political make-up of Wakefield Council
Party	Seats			Current Council (2011)
Party	2008	2010	2011	Current Council (2011)
Labour	32	34	39	
Conservative	23	23	21	
Independent	6	5	3	
Lib Dems	2	1	0	

== Election result ==
Wakefield local election result 2011
Party	Seats	Gains	Losses	Net gain/loss	Seats %	Votes %	Votes	+/−
Labour	17	5	0	+5	81.0	55.8	49,995	+12.8
Conservative	4	1	3	-2	19.0	29.9	26,752	+0.9
Liberal Democrats	0	0	1	-1	0.0	5.0	4,439	-7
Independent	0	0	2	-2	0.0	3.5	3,105	-3.5
UKIP	0	0	0	0	0.0	3.1	2,821	+3
Green	0	0	0	0	0.0	0.9	831	
BNP	0	0	0	0	0.0	0.8	759	-8
Socialist Alternative	0	0	0	0	0.0	0.3	305	

- 0.7% of ballots were spoilt

== Ward results ==
=== Ackworth, North Elmsall and Upton ward ===
Ackworth, North Elmsall and Upton
Party	Candidate	Votes	%	±%
Labour	Jean Askew	2,484	52.2	+14.6
Conservative	Don Marshall	1,643	34.6	+4.7
BNP	Ian Kitchen	318	6.7	−2.4
Liberal Democrats	David Arthur	285	6.0	−7
Majority		841	17.7	+10.6
Turnout		4,755	37.5	−25.5
Labour hold		Swing		

=== Airedale and Ferry Fryston ward ===
Airedale and Ferry Fryston
Party	Candidate	Votes	%	±%
Labour	Yvonne Crewe	2,611	80.1	+24.4
Conservative	Mellisa Wan Omer	627	19.2	+7.1
Majority		1,984	60.9	+22.2
Turnout		3,258	28.2	−23.4
Labour hold		Swing		

=== Altofts and Whitwood ward ===
Altofts and Whitwood
Party	Candidate	Votes	%	±%
Labour	Heather Hudson	2,582	64.1	+17.9
Conservative	Steven Beeton	1,009	25.1	+3.8
Liberal Democrats	Michael Burch	404	10.0	−10.9
Majority		1,573	39.1	+14.2
Turnout		4,027	32.2	−27.5
Labour hold		Swing		

=== Castleford Central and Glasshoughton ward ===
Castleford Central and Glasshoughton
Party	Candidate	Votes	%	±%
Labour	Tony Wallis	2,641	74.2	+11.1
UKIP	Alison Bullivant	477	13.4	+13.4
Conservative	Eamonn Mullins	426	12	−6.4
Majority		2,164	60.8	+16.1
Turnout		3,558	54.5	−24.9
Labour hold		Swing		

=== Crofton, Ryhill and Walton ward ===
Crofton, Ryhill and Walton
Party	Candidate	Votes	%	±%
Labour	Maureen Cummings	2,954	61.2	+21.3
Conservative	Jane Brown	1,446	30.0	+1
Liberal Democrats	Christopher Pilkington	403	8.3	−7.6
Majority		1,508	31.2	+20.4
Turnout		4,827	39.7	−25.7
Labour hold		Swing		

=== Featherstone ward ===
Featherstone
Party	Candidate	Votes	%	±%
Labour	Graham Isherwood	2,707	62.3	+6.3
Independent	Steve Vickers	1,093	25.1	+4.4
Conservative	June Harrison	516	11.9	−1.1
Majority		1,614	37.1	+1.8
Turnout		4,347	34.4	−21.8
Labour gain from Independent		Swing		

=== Hemsworth ward ===
Hemsworth
Party	Candidate	Votes	%	±%
Labour	Glyn Lloyd	2,322	59.5	+4.8
Independent	Raymond Warren	1,078	27.6	+7.4
Conservative	Philip Davies	471	12.1	−2.1
Majority		1,244	31.9	−2.6
Turnout		3,902	32.9	−23.7
Labour hold		Swing		

=== Horbury and South Ossett ward ===
Horbury and South Ossett
Party	Candidate	Votes	%	±%
Labour	Brian Holmes	2,433	48.7	+12.4
Conservative	Alyson Ripley	2,048	41.0	+3.4
Liberal Democrats	Mark Goodair	473	9.5	−9.3
Majority		385	7.7	
Turnout		4,998	41.4	−25.7
Labour gain from Conservative		Swing		

=== Knottingley ward ===
Knottingley
Party	Candidate	Votes	%	±%
Labour	Glenn Burton	1,803	57.5	+1.6
Conservative	Jon Wadey	493	15.7	−9.2
Independent	Jack Wright	486	15.5	+15.5
UKIP	Nathan Garbutt	336	10.7	+10.7
Majority		1,319	41.8	+10.8
Turnout		3,135	29.5	−22.7
Labour hold		Swing		

=== Normanton ward ===
Normanton
Party	Candidate	Votes	%	±%
Labour	David Dagger	2,266	63.9	+16.9
Conservative	Jean Molloy	649	18.3	−2.2
UKIP	Bryan Barkley	613	17.3	+17.3
Majority		1,617	45.6	+19.1
Turnout		3,546	28.5	−25.1
Labour hold		Swing		

=== Ossett ward ===
Ossett
Party	Candidate	Votes	%	±%
Conservative	Angela Taylor	2,178	43.1	+8
Labour	Tony Richardson	2,039	40.3	+11.6
Liberal Democrats	David Smith	801	15.8	−12
Majority		139	2.7	
Turnout		5,055	39.7	−26.5
Conservative gain from Liberal Democrats		Swing		

=== Pontefract North ward ===
Pontefract North
Party	Candidate	Votes	%	±%
Labour	Pat Garbutt	2,261	59.8	+14.2
Conservative	Chris Speight	894	23.6	−0.2
UKIP	Justin Hudson	403	10.7	+10.7
Green	Rennie Smith	205	5.4	+3.2
Majority		1,367	36.1	+14.3
Turnout		3,784	31.2	−24.4
Labour hold		Swing		

=== Pontefract South ward ===
Pontefract South
Party	Candidate	Votes	%	±%
Labour	Tony Dean	2,734	53.5	+17.1
Conservative	Philip Booth	2,341	45.8	+6.7
Majority		393	7.7	
Turnout		5,114	42.5	−20.5
Labour gain from Conservative		Swing		

=== South Elmsall and South Kirkby ward ===
South Elmsall and South Kirkby
Party	Candidate	Votes	%	±%
Labour	Steven Tulley	3,613	77.6	+30.8
Conservative	Christian IAnson	563	12.1	+2.1
BNP	Darren Lumb	441	9.5	−4.1
Majority		3,050	65.5	+47.7
Turnout		4,656	34.7	−19.7
Labour gain from Independent		Swing		

=== Stanley and Outwood East ward ===
Stanley and Outwood East
Party	Candidate	Votes	%	±%
Labour	Clive Hudson	2,478	55.3	+17.8
Conservative	Richard Wakefield	1,611	36.0	+3.1
Liberal Democrats	Margaret Dodd	360	8.0	−11.6
Majority		867	19.3	+14.7
Turnout		4,481	37.1	−28.1
Labour hold		Swing		

=== Wakefield East ward ===
Wakefield East
Party	Candidate	Votes	%	±%
Labour	Ron Halliday	2,497	63.0	+13.5
Conservative	Anthony Bracewell	786	19.8	−0.7
Socialist Alternative	Michael Griffiths	355	9.0	+6.5
Liberal Democrats	Rob Bell	294	7.4	+7.4
Majority		1,711	43.2	+14.2
Turnout		3,964	33.6	−19.9
Labour hold		Swing		

=== Wakefield North ward ===
Wakefield North
Party	Candidate	Votes	%	±%
Labour	Margaret Isherwood	2,096	57.2	+15
Conservative	Gareth Hunt	915	25	−4.7
UKIP	Keith Wells	379	10.3	+6.6
Liberal Democrats	Dale Doug	259	7.1	−10.1
Majority		1,181	32.2	+19.7
Turnout		3,667	32.8	−24.6
Labour hold		Swing		

=== Wakefield Rural ward ===
Wakefield Rural
Party	Candidate	Votes	%	±%
Conservative	Ian Sanders	2,384	44.0	−0.6
Labour	John Newsome	2,310	42.6	+11.5
Green	Miriam Hawkins	418	7.7	+7.7
Liberal Democrats	Dennis Cronin	271	5.0	−11.4
Majority		74	1.4	−12.2
Turnout		5,421	40.3	−28.7
Conservative hold		Swing		

=== Wakefield South ward ===
Wakefield South
Party	Candidate	Votes	%	±%
Conservative	Monica Graham	2,545	54.7	+16.5
Labour	Nick Brown	1,610	34.6	+10.6
Liberal Democrats	Stephen Nuthall	469	10.1	−5.5
Majority		935	20.1	+5.9
Turnout		4,655	43.4	−23.2
Conservative hold		Swing		

=== Wakefield West ward ===
Wakefield West
Party	Candidate	Votes	%	±%
Conservative	Bill Sanders	1,569	40.1	+2.0
Labour	Hilary Mitchell	1,521	38.9	+3.6
Independent	Norman Tate	448	11.5	+11.5
Green	Brian Else	208	5.3	+1.5
Liberal Democrats	Susan Morgan	140	3.6	−10.7
Majority		48	1.2	−1.6
Turnout		3,908	34.5	−21.5
Conservative hold		Swing		

=== Wrenthorpe and Outwood West ward ===
Wrenthorpe and Outwood West
Party	Candidate	Votes	%	±%
Labour	Charlie Keith	2,033	44.4	+1.9
Conservative	Richard Hunt	1,638	35.8	−10.1
UKIP	David Dews	613	13.4	+13.4
Liberal Democrats	Sean McHale	280	6.1	+6.1
Majority		395	8.6	
Turnout		4,574	39.4	−25.1
Labour gain from Conservative		Swing		
