= 2003 Wakefield Metropolitan District Council election =

2003 UK local government election

The 2003 Wakefield Metropolitan District Council election took place on 1 May 2003 to elect members of Wakefield Metropolitan District Council in West Yorkshire, England. One third of the council was up for election and the Labour Party kept overall control of the council.

After the election, the composition of the council was:

- Labour 50
- Conservative 7
- Liberal Democrat 3
- Independent 3

== Election result ==
The results saw Labour lose 2 seats to the Conservatives in Pontefract South and Wakefield Rural, and 1 seat to the Liberal Democrats in Ossett. Labour remained firmly in control, and while they were disappointed to lose 3 seats, the results were seen as being "not too bad" by the Labour council leader Peter Box. No other party won any seats, but the votes for the British National Party concerned the other political leaders. Voter turnout was lowest in South Elmsall ward at 18.6%.

Wakefield local election result 2003
Party	Seats	Gains	Losses	Net gain/loss	Seats %	Votes %	Votes	+/−
Labour	17	0	3	-3	81.0	46.1	27,678	-7.4
Conservative	3	2	0	+2	14.3	25.3	15,168	+0.6
Liberal Democrats	1	1	0	+1	4.8	11.2	6,700	-0.2
Independent	0	0	0	0	0.0	11.5	6,896	+5.5
BNP	0	0	0	0	0.0	2.4	1,413	+2.4
UKIP	0	0	0	0	0.0	1.5	913	+1.0
Socialist Labour	0	0	0	0	0.0	1.2	707	-1.7
Socialist Alternative	0	0	0	0	0.0	0.6	390	+0.0
Socialist Alliance	0	0	0	0	0.0	0.2	141	-0.2

== Ward results ==
Castleford Ferry Fryston
Party	Candidate	Votes	%	±%
Labour	James Nicholson	1,117	58.7	−16.9
Independent	John Bird	621	32.6	+32.6
Conservative	Madge Richards	166	8.7	−5.7
Majority		496	26.1	−35.1
Turnout		1,904	20.7	+1.3
Labour hold		Swing		

Castleford Glasshoughton
Party	Candidate	Votes	%	±%
Labour	Paul Phelps	1,655	80.6	−1.5
Conservative	Charles Scholes	399	19.4	+8.2
Majority		1,256	61.2	−9.7
Turnout		2,054	19.5	−1.7
Labour hold		Swing		

Castleford Whitwood
Party	Candidate	Votes	%	±%
Labour	Peter Box	1,424	75.3	−7.6
Conservative	Elizabeth Rhodes	320	16.9	+6.1
Socialist Labour	Kathryn Summerscales	148	7.8	+1.5
Majority		1,104	58.4	−13.7
Turnout		1,892	19.9	−2.2
Labour hold		Swing		

Crofton & Ackworth
Party	Candidate	Votes	%	±%
Labour	Roy Hirst	1,310	40.3	−10.9
Liberal Democrats	James McDougall	769	23.7	+1.8
Independent	Christopher Hazell	640	19.7	+19.7
Conservative	Michael Ledgard	530	16.3	−1.8
Majority		541	16.6	−12.7
Turnout		3,249	26.8	+1.4
Labour hold		Swing		

Featherstone
Party	Candidate	Votes	%	±%
Labour	Graham Isherwood	1,554	71.3	−11.7
Conservative	Terence Brown	433	19.9	+2.9
Socialist Labour	Zane Carpenter	192	8.8	+8.8
Majority		1,121	51.4	−14.6
Turnout		2,179	20.4	+0.0
Labour hold		Swing		

Hemsworth
Party	Candidate	Votes	%	±%
Labour	Glyn Lloyd	1,384	61.1	−11.4
Independent	Roy Bateman	579	25.6	+25.6
Conservative	Eamonn Mullins	301	13.3	−3.2
Majority		805	35.5	−20.5
Turnout		2,264	21.5	+0.7
Labour hold		Swing		

Horbury
Party	Candidate	Votes	%	±%
Labour	Janet Holmes	1,519	37.4	−5.8
Conservative	Caroline Smith	1,054	26.0	−11.6
Liberal Democrats	Mark Goodair	695	17.1	−0.3
BNP	John Aveyard	629	15.5	+15.5
Independent	John Alexander	161	4.0	+4.0
Majority		465	11.4	+5.8
Turnout		4,058	34.1	+7.1
Labour hold		Swing		

Knottingley
Party	Candidate	Votes	%	±%
Labour	Graham Clarke	1,297	60.4	−15.5
Conservative	David Howarth	403	18.8	−5.3
Liberal Democrats	Carey Chambers	261	12.2	+12.2
UKIP	Colin Batty	185	8.6	+8.6
Majority		894	41.6	−10.2
Turnout		2,146	21.2	+0.5
Labour hold		Swing		

Normanton & Sharlston
Party	Candidate	Votes	%	±%
Labour	Barry Smith	1,354	49.1	−0.7
Independent	Graeme Milner	797	28.9	+3.6
Conservative	Allan Couch	370	13.4	+0.2
Socialist Labour	Norman Hartshorne	237	8.6	−3.1
Majority		557	20.2	−4.3
Turnout		2,758	21.9	+1.3
Labour hold		Swing		

Ossett
Party	Candidate	Votes	%	±%
Liberal Democrats	Elizabeth Knowles	1,639	38.8	−16.1
Labour	Donald Hitchen	1,112	26.3	−5.4
BNP	Suzy Cass	784	18.6	+18.6
Conservative	Glenn Armitage	689	16.3	+3.0
Majority		527	12.5	−10.7
Turnout		4,224	34.4	+3.3
Liberal Democrats gain from Labour		Swing		

Pontefract North
Party	Candidate	Votes	%	±%
Labour	Clive Tennant	1,443	58.2	−10.0
Conservative	Richard Molloy	536	21.6	−1.6
UKIP	Howard Burdon	352	14.2	+14.2
Socialist Alternative	John Gill	149	6.0	+1.1
Majority		907	36.6	−8.4
Turnout		2,480	19.7	−1.3
Labour hold		Swing		

Pontefract South
Party	Candidate	Votes	%	±%
Conservative	Philip Booth	1,290	44.1	
Labour	Patricia Garbutt	1,270	43.4	
UKIP	James Marran	224	7.7	
Socialist Alliance	Alan Hyman	141	4.8	
Majority		20	0.7	
Turnout		2,925	27.9	−0.5
Conservative gain from Labour		Swing		

South Elmsall
Party	Candidate	Votes	%	±%
Labour	Allan Garbutt	1,398	67.8	−0.3
Conservative	Ian Hall	664	32.2	+14.2
Majority		736	35.6	−14.5
Turnout		2,062	18.6	−2.6
Labour hold		Swing		

South Kirkby
Party	Candidate	Votes	%	±%
Labour	Mollie Wright	1,714	81.0	+35.8
Conservative	Christian l'Anson	403	19.0	+14.0
Majority		1,311	62.0	
Turnout		2,117	20.9	−3.2
Labour hold		Swing		

Stanley & Altofts
Party	Candidate	Votes	%	±%
Labour	Kevin Swift	1,129	35.4	−16.5
Conservative	Pauline Mitchell	849	26.6	+3.3
Liberal Democrats	Michael Burch	578	18.1	−4.1
Independent	Steve Gilks	501	15.7	+15.7
Socialist Labour	Thomas Appleyard	130	4.1	+1.5
Majority		280	8.8	−19.8
Turnout		3,187	23.4	+0.3
Labour hold		Swing		

Stanley & Wrenthorpe
Party	Candidate	Votes	%	±%
Labour	David Lund	1,266	34.3	−11.7
Conservative	James Dick	954	25.9	−5.5
Independent	Alexander Adie	808	21.9	+21.9
Liberal Democrats	Margaret Dodd	658	17.9	−4.7
Majority		312	8.4	−6.2
Turnout		3,686	24.8	+0.8
Labour hold		Swing		

Wakefield Central
Party	Candidate	Votes	%	±%
Labour	Denise Jeffery	1,430	44.0	−4.9
Conservative	Jane Brown	1,251	38.5	−0.4
Independent	Catherine Holmes	567	17.5	+17.5
Majority		179	5.5	−4.5
Turnout		3,248	30.0	−8.5
Labour hold		Swing		

Wakefield East
Party	Candidate	Votes	%	±%
Labour	Richard Hayward	1,091	37.1	−8.3
Conservative	John Berry	639	21.7	+5.3
Liberal Democrats	Alan Dale	532	18.1	+9.3
Independent	Georgina Fenton	436	14.8	+5.2
Socialist Alternative	Michael Griffiths	241	8.2	+0.7
Majority		452	15.4	−13.6
Turnout		2,939	26.1	−0.5
Labour hold		Swing		

Wakefield North
Party	Candidate	Votes	%	±%
Labour	Elizabeth Rhodes	1,103	39.7	−16.1
Conservative	Michael Mitchell	708	25.5	+1.4
Liberal Democrats	Douglas Dale	558	20.1	+4.3
Independent	Jeffrey Warriner	254	9.2	+9.2
UKIP	Keith Wells	152	5.5	+1.2
Majority		395	14.2	−17.5
Turnout		2,775	25.9	+1.1
Labour hold		Swing		

Wakefield Rural
Party	Candidate	Votes	%	±%
Conservative	June Drysdale	1,514	41.8	−1.8
Labour	Maureen Cummings	1,132	31.2	−11.6
Independent	Michael Greensmith	527	14.5	+14.5
Liberal Democrats	Susan Morgan	451	12.4	−1.1
Majority		382	10.6	+9.8
Turnout		3,623	28.5	+0.6
Conservative gain from Labour		Swing		

Wakefield South
Party	Candidate	Votes	%	±%
Conservative	David Hopkins	1,695	40.0	+11.0
Labour	Hazel Chowcat	976	23.0	−3.9
Independent	Nicholas Hazell	873	20.6	−12.9
Liberal Democrats	Stephen Nuthall	559	13.2	+2.7
Independent	Stephen Selby	132	3.1	+3.1
Majority		719	17.0	
Turnout		4,235	35.1	−2.9
Conservative hold		Swing		
