= Wentbridge =

Village in West Yorkshire, England

Coordinates: 53.648°N 1.260°W

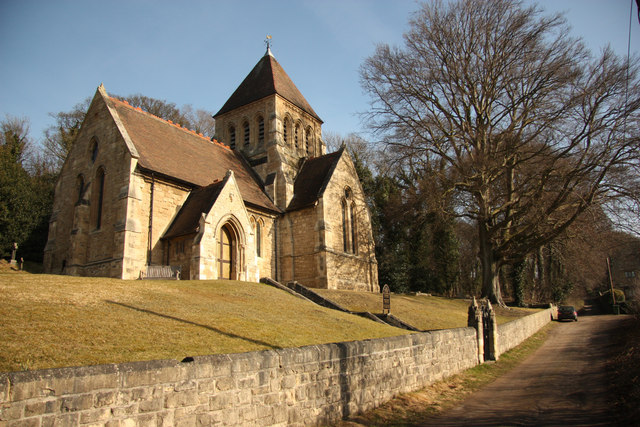
- St John the Evangelist's Church

- Location within West Yorkshire
- OS grid reference: SE488173
  - London: 155 mi (249 km) SSE
- Civil parish: Wentbridge
- Metropolitan borough: Wakefield
- Metropolitan county: West Yorkshire
- Region: Yorkshire and the Humber
- Country: England
- Sovereign state: United Kingdom
- Post town: PONTEFRACT
- Postcode district: WF8
- Dialling code: 01977
- Police: West Yorkshire
- Fire: West Yorkshire
- Ambulance: Yorkshire
- UK Parliament: Normanton, Pontefract and Castleford; Hemsworth

Wentbridge is a village and civil parish in the Wakefield district of West Yorkshire, England. It lies around 3 miles (5 km) southeast of its nearest town of size, Pontefract, close to the A1 road.

The village contains one of the largest viaducts in Europe, its significance sanctioned by the Museum of Modern Art. Wentbridge is one of a number of locations that have connections to the legend of Robin Hood.

== Geography and topography ==
Wentbridge sits in the heart of the Went Valley, on the northernmost edge of the medieval vale of Barnsdale, seen by many medievalists as the official home of Robin Hood. During the Middle Ages the village of Wentbridge was sometimes referred to as Barnsdale because it was the main settlement in the Forest of Barnsdale, and it was possible to look down upon the village from the Saylis. The county boundary follows the A1 from the River Went to Barnsdale Bar, which is the southernmost point of North Yorkshire. Close by to the southwest is the Roman Ridge, a Roman road which closely follows the course of the modern-day A639. To the north is Darrington. Earlier historians had assumed that this district was heavily wooded but aerial photography and excavation have shown that the region has always been a largely pastoral landscape dotted with occasional settlements.

The village of Wentbridge straddles the River Went, from which it takes its name, along a north–south axis and sits less than a mile from the county boundary with North Yorkshire to the east. The village is so named because it was the site of a bridge on the Great North Road over the River Went. Entrance to the village was down a steep valley side which would have been a problem before motorised transport and eventually became a bottleneck. Wentbridge House, one of the properties near the river and on the Great North Road still exists as the Wentbridge House Hotel.

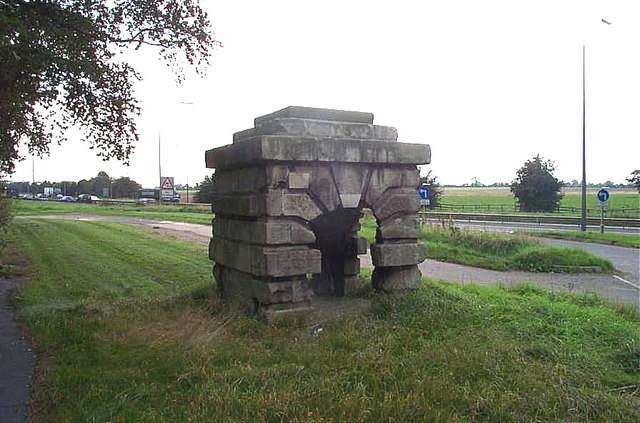
Robin Hood's Well is on the east of the southbound carriageway of the A1, just south of Barnsdale Bar.

In close proximity to the village of Wentbridge there are, or were, some landmarks that relate to Robin Hood. The earliest-known Robin Hood place-name reference - in Yorkshire or anywhere else - occurs in a deed of 1322 from the two cartularies of Monk Bretton Priory, near Barnsley. The cartulary deed refers in Latin to a landmark named 'the Stone of Robert Hode' (Robin Hood's Stone), which was located in the Barnsdale area. According to J. W. Walker this was on the eastern side of the Great North Road, a mile south of Barnsdale Bar. On the opposite side of the road stood Hood's Well, which has since been relocated six miles north-west of Doncaster, on the south-bound side of the Great North Road.

== Governance ==
Wentbridge was unusual in that it had parts in three different civil parishes: the entire portion of the village to the north of the river, including the village church, was within the parish of Darrington, whilst south of the river, that part of the village on the west side of the B6474 road was within Thorpe Audlin parish, with buildings on the road's eastern side formerly in North Elmsall parish.

The village is divided between two council wards, and two parliamentary constituencies: north of the river the village is in the Pontefract South ward in the Normanton, Pontefract and Castleford parliamentary constituency; south of the river, the Ackworth, North Elmsall and Upton ward in the Hemsworth constituency. The village's two Members of Parliament are Yvette Cooper and Jon Trickett.

As of March 2022, parish boundary changes affecting Wentbridge were being discussed by Wakefield Council. The North Elmsall portion, which was transferred from Selby District, North Yorkshire, on an unknown date, was virtually detached from the bulk of North Elmsall parish where the boundary followed a short section of the A1 road. The A1 now forms the eastern boundary of the new parish past the village.

On 1 April 2023 Wentbridge became a separate civil parish, being formed from parts of Darrington, Thorpe Audlin, and the detached part of North Elmsall. The parish has a parish meeting rather than a parish council.

== Amenities ==
On the Great North Road in the village are a four-star hotel and the Blue Bell Inn public house. The village church is dedicated to St John the Evangelist. It is within the Went Valley group of parishes in the Diocese of Leeds.

== Wentbridge Viaduct ==
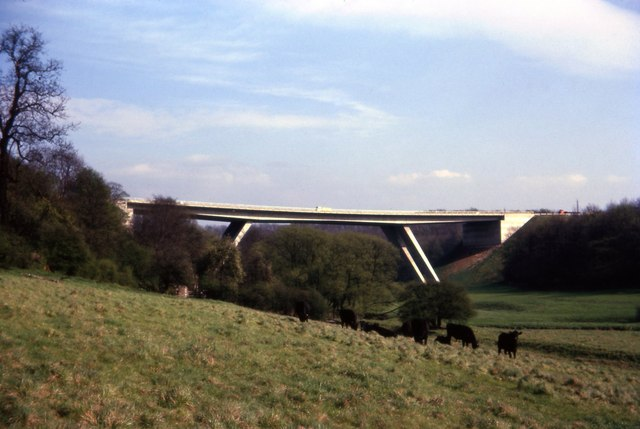
Wentbridge Viaduct

To avoid the incline on the valley, when the village was bypassed at a cost of £803,000 in 1961, one of the then-largest viaducts in Europe was built to cross the Went valley at a height of 98 feet (30 m) using prestressed concrete. It is 308 feet (94 m) long and was designed by F. A. (Joe) Sims, and constructed by Taylor Woodrow and became a Grade II listed building on 29 May 1998. In 1964 the engineering significance of the bridge was recognised by New York's Museum of Modern Art. Thirty years after its construction it received an award from the Concrete Society.

== History ==
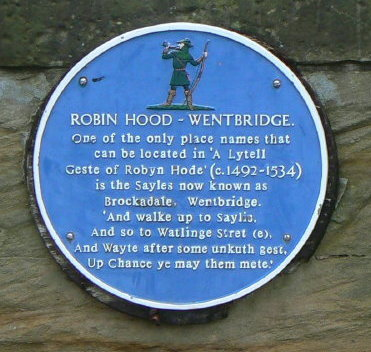
A blue plaque commemorating Wentbridge's Robin Hood connections

=== Anglo-Saxon history ===
The Anglo-Saxon Battle of Winwaed is believed to have taken place between Wentbridge and Ackworth where what is now the A639 (a main Roman road) crosses the River Went. The battle was a pivotal event that decided the religious destiny of the English. The most powerful pagan king in seventh-century England, Penda, was defeated by the Christian Oswiu in 655, effectively ending Anglo-Saxon paganism.

Archaeologists believe that a mound in Wentbridge was the location of an Anglo-Saxon fortification.

=== Robin Hood ===
English Heritage has placed a blue plaque on the bridge that crosses the River Went, recognising Wentbridge's (and Barnsdale's) strong claim to be the original home of Robin Hood. Wentbridge is mentioned in what may be the earliest surviving manuscript of a Robin Hood ballad, "Robin Hood and the Potter": "'Y mete hem bot at Went breg,' s(e)yde Lytyll John" ('I met him but at Wentbridge', said Little John). Though Wentbridge is not specifically named in the medieval ballad entitled "A Gest of Robyn Hode", the ballad does appear to make a cryptic reference to the locality by depicting a friendly knight explaining to Robin that he ‘went at a brydge’ where there was 'a wraste-lyng' (wrestling).

=== The Saylis ===
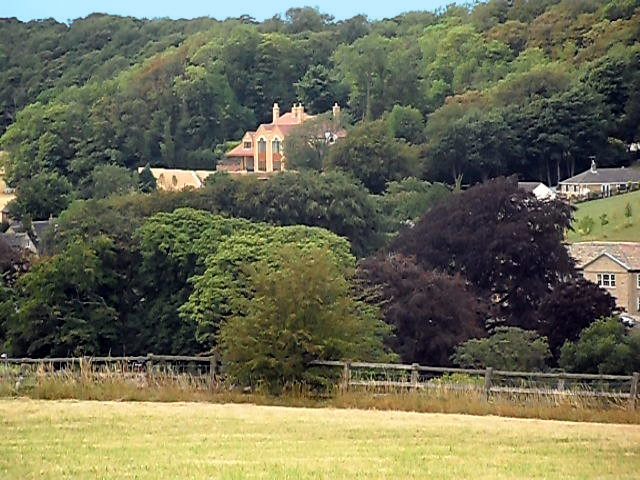
Site of the Saylis

The Gest of Robyn Hode makes specific references to 'the Saylis' and 'the Sayles', and a landmark by that name was certainly located near Wentbridge. The outlaw himself mentions the site in the First Fytte of the Gest.

The 19th-century antiquary Joseph Hunter (a Yorkshireman by birth) identified its likely site: a small tenancy, of one-tenth of a knight's fee (i.e. a knight's annual income), located on high ground 500 yards (457.2 metres) to the east of the village of Wentbridge in the manor of Pontefract. The high ground which overlooks the area – 120 feet (36.576 metres) above the flat terrain - was then known as Sayles Plantation. From this location it was possible to see across the whole of the Went Valley and observe the traffic that passed along the Great North Road, thus demonstrating its significance as a lookout-point in the Gest. The Saylis is recorded as having contributed towards the aid that was granted to King Edward III in 1346-47 for the knighting of his son, the Black Prince. Such evidence of continuity makes it virtually certain that the Saylis or Sayles which was so well known to the Robin Hood of the "Gest" survived into modern times as the 'Sayles Plantation' near Wentbridge. The historians Richard Barrie Dobson and John Taylor indicate that this location provides a specific clue to Robin Hood's Wentbridge heritage.

=== Swein-son-of-Siccga, 'The Prince of Thieves' ===
An infamous outlaw known as 'The Prince of Thieves" once inhabited Wentbridge. A medieval chronicler speaks of an outlaw named Swein-son-of-Sicga who robbed Abbot Benedict of Selby and "constantly prowled around Yorkshire's woods with his band on perpetual raids". J. Green indicates that Hugh fitzBaldric, the late-eleventh-century Sheriff of Nottinghamshire and Yorkshire, held responsibility for bringing Swein-son-of-Sicga to justice. Historians indicate that the deeds of Yorkshire's outlaws, men such as Swein-son-of-Siccga, and their battles against the Sheriff of Nottingham, gave birth to the legend of Robin Hood.

== See also ==
- Listed buildings in Darrington, West Yorkshire
