= Wentbridge Viaduct =

Road bridge in West Yorkshire, England

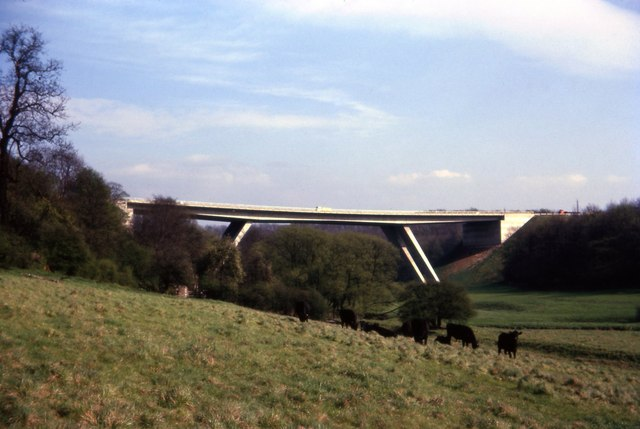
- Wentbridge Viaduct
- Coordinates: 53.649°N 1.255°W
- Carries: A1 road
- Crosses: River Went
- Locale: Wentbridge, West Yorkshire, England
- Other name: Wentbridge Flyover
- Owner: National Highways
- Heritage status: Grade II listed

Characteristics
- Material: Concrete; Steel
- Total length: 472 feet (144 m)
- Width: 87 feet (27 m)
- Height: 100 feet (30 m)
- No. of lanes: 4

History
- Construction start: October 1959
- Construction cost: £803,000
- Opened: November 1961
- Replaces: Went Bridge

Location
- Interactive map of Wentbridge Viaduct

Wentbridge Viaduct is a road bridge in West Yorkshire, England. The viaduct carries four lanes of the A1 road over the small valley of the River Went at an elevated level, replacing the previous bridge which was down on the valley floor and to the west in the village of Wentbridge. The viaduct, which is made from pre-stressed concrete, was opened in 1961, and is grade II listed.

== History ==
The location of the bridge is 10 miles (16 km) north of Doncaster, 173 miles (278 km) north of London, and 5 miles (8 km) south of Ferrybridge. The viaduct straddles the valley of the River Went, with the village of Wentbridge to the west, and a nature reserve immediately to the east. Before the building of the Wentbridge Bypass, traffic was required to go through Wentbridge village on a "torturous descent" which created bottlenecks, and over a Medieval bridge which was very narrow in the village of Wentbridge itself, before another incline took the road out of the Went Valley. To alleviate these problems, the Wentbridge bypass, including a new bridge over the valley, was approved in 1959.

Construction of the viaduct required the use of 120 miles (190 km) of scaffolding, and 170,000 scaffolding fittings, all of which was required to withstand a wind force of 90 miles per hour (140 km/h) and support a weight of 8,200 tonnes (9,000 tons). The original gap between the two valley sides was 1,000 feet (300 m), but this was shortened by the building of embankments at either side. The bridge was designed by the Highways and Bridges division of West Riding County Council, though most design work was undertaken by Joe Sims.

The viaduct was opened in November 1961, and has a total length of 472 feet (144 m), and a height of 100 feet (30 m). The width of the bridge is 87 feet (27 m), which includes two 36-foot (11 m) sections with a 15 feet (4.6 m) gap dividing each pair of two-lane sections. The distance between the two supports at ground level is 308 feet (94 m). Two weeks after opening to motorists (11 December 1961), the traffic was stopped and a ribbon was unfurled across the carriageway for the official opening. In 1959, the bridge was costed at £682,000 (equivalent to £13,796,000 in 2025), but because of some extra works, including a two-lane bridge carrying the Went Edge Road over the southern end of Wentbridge Viaduct, the final price was £803,000 (equivalent to £15,592,000 in 2025).

The structure had a design capacity of 300 tonnes (330 tons) and was part of the Wentbridge Bypass, which took the road on higher ground away from Wentbridge, although the road does dip down, or sag, from the main road into the Went Valley.

The design of the bridge includes Freyssinet Hinges, the first time this type of hinge had been used in the United Kingdom. Both the Royal Fine Art Commission and the Museum of Modern Art in New York highlighted the "aesthetic qualities" of the viaduct, with MOMA including it in their 1964 exhibition of 20th century engineering. At the time of its opening, it was the longest bridge of its type in Europe. In May 1998, the bridge was grade II listed by Historic England.

In 2014, the bridge typically carried up to 86,000 vehicles per day, of which 19% were heavy goods vehicles. National Highways undertook a renovation of the viaduct in 2023 to waterproof the bridge.

== See also ==
- Listed buildings in Darrington, West Yorkshire
