= Listed buildings in Walden Stubbs =

Walden Stubbs is a civil parish in the county of North Yorkshire, England. It contains seven listed buildings that are recorded in the National Heritage List for England. Of these, one is listed at Grade II*, the middle of the three grades, and the others are at Grade II, the lowest grade. The parish contains the village of Walden Stubbs and the surrounding countryside. The listed building consist of farmhouses, farm buildings, the remains of a village cross, and a bridge.

== Key ==
Grade	Criteria
II*	Particularly important buildings of more than special interest
II	Buildings of national importance and special interest

== Buildings ==
Name and location	Photograph	Date	Notes	Grade
Village Cross; 53.64063°N 1.17322°W		Medieval	The remains of the cross are in magnesian limestone. They consist of an octagonal base on which is the stump of a cross shaft, overall about 0.5 metres (1 ft 8 in) in height.	II
Stubbs Hall; 53.64541°N 1.17112°W		17th century	The farmhouse is in magnesian limestone, with some rendering, dressings in stone and brick, quoins, and a hipped stone slate roof. There are two storeys and attics, and a projecting bay on the right. The doorway has quoined and moulded jambs, a heavy moulded lintel and a hood mould, and above it is a plaque containing a coat of arms. The windows are mullioned, some with hood moulds, and on the left bay are blocked windows under brick relieving arches. On the wing is a stair sash window with a quoined brick surround. Inside, there is an inglenook fireplace.	II*
Manor Farmhouse; 53.64282°N 1.16878°W	—	Late 17th century (probable)	The farmhouse is in magnesian limestone, and has a pantile roof with two courses of stone slate. There are two storeys and an L-shaped plan, with a main range of four bays, a projecting bay to the left, and a rear range on the right. The doorway has a heavy lintel, and the windows are mullioned.	II
Former pigeoncote, Old Hall Farm; 53.64532°N 1.17034°W	—	Mid to late 18th century	The former pigeoncote is in pinkish-brown brick on a magnesian limestone plinth, with stone dressings, a floor band, a cogged eaves band and a hipped stone slate roof. There are two storeys, a square plan, and one bay. On two sides are blind Diocletian windows.	II
Former barn, Old Hall Farm; 53.64574°N 1.17026°W	—	Late 18th century (probable)	The former barn is in magnesian limestone, with brick dressings, quoins, and a hipped stone slate roof. There is a single tall storey and three bays, and the building contains a central cart entrance with a segmental brick arch and slit vents.	II
Former carriage house, stables and barn, Old Hall Farm; 53.64556°N 1.17054°W	—	Late 18th century (probable)	The farm buildings are in magnesian limestone, with brick dressings, quoins, and hipped stone slate roofs. They form an L-shaped plan, the main range with two storeys and the wing with one storey. In the centre of each range is a carriage arch with an architrave, imposts and a keystone. The main range contains four stable entrances with heavy lintels and imposts, and on the upper floor are openings with architraves under brick relieving arches. At the rear are slit vents, the right gable has a blocked mullioned window, and on both gable ends are pitching doors.	II
Went Bridge; 53.63877°N 1.14670°W		1832–33	The bridge carries Selby Road (A19 road) over the River Went. It is in magnesian limestone, and consists of a single segmental arch set in a curve rising from vertical abutments. The bridge has rusticated voussoirs, a keystone with a carved head, a band, domed parapet copings, and splayed wing walls with end piers.	II
