= Old Hall Farm =

Farmhouse in Walden Stubbs, North Yorkshire, England

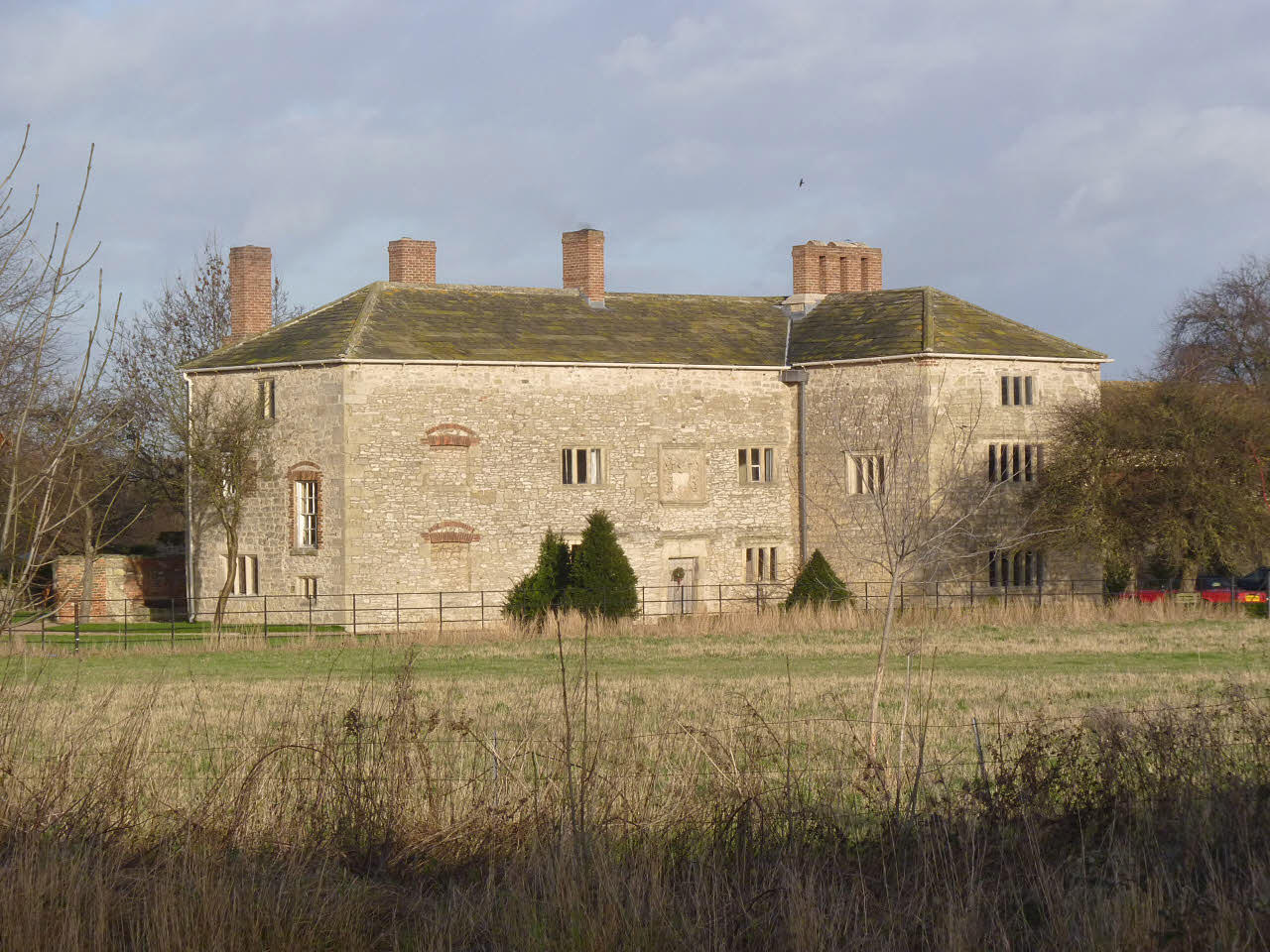
- The farmhouse in 2013

- Location within North Yorkshire
- Alternative names: Stubbs Hall

General information
- Location: Walden Stubbs, North Yorkshire, England
- Coordinates: 53.6454°N 1.1711°W
- Year built: 17th century
- Renovated: Early 19th century (altered)

Listed Building – Grade II*
- Official name: Stubbs Hall
- Designated: 25 March 1968
- Reference no.: 1174475

Listed Building – Grade II
- Official name: Former carriage house, stables, barn and butchery at Old Hall Farm
- Designated: 25 March 1968
- Reference no.: 1174479

Listed Building – Grade II
- Official name: Former pigeoncote to Old Hall Farm
- Designated: 9 April 1987
- Reference no.: 1148405

Listed Building – Grade II
- Official name: Former barn to Old Hall Farm
- Designated: 9 April 1987
- Reference no.: 1148406

Old Hall Farm, also known as Stubbs Hall, is a historic building in Walden Stubbs, a village in North Yorkshire, England.

The manor house was built in two stages in the 17th century, for the Shuttleworth family. In 1674, it was recorded as having 13 hearths. The building was altered in the early 19th century and later. By the mid-19th century it was used as a farmhouse. The building was Grade II* listed in 1968.

The farmhouse is built of magnesian limestone, with some rendering, dressings in stone and brick, quoins, and a hipped stone slate roof. It has two storeys and attics, and a projecting bay on the right. The doorway has quoined and moulded jambs, a heavy moulded lintel and a hood mould, and above it is a plaque containing a coat of arms. The windows are mullioned, some with hood moulds, and on the left bay are blocked windows under brick relieving arches. On the wing is a stair sash window with a quoined brick surround. Inside, there is an inglenook fireplace, and a late 17th-century staircase with a carved balustrade. Many rooms have 17th-century panelling.

Several outbuildings were constructed in the mid or late 18th century, and are Grade II listed. The former carriage house, stables, barn, and butchery are built of magnesian limestone, with brick dressings, quoins, and hipped stone slate roofs. They form an L-shaped plan, the main range with two storeys and the wing with one storey. In the centre of each range is a carriage arch with an architrave, imposts and a keystone. The main range contains four stable entrances with heavy lintels and imposts, and on the upper floor are openings with architraves under brick relieving arches. At the rear are slit vents, the right gable has a blocked mullioned window, and on both gable ends are pitching doors.

The former pigeoncote is in pinkish-brown brick on a magnesian limestone plinth, with stone dressings, a floor band, a cogged eaves band and a hipped stone slate roof. It has two storeys, a square plan, and one bay. On two sides are blind Diocletian windows.

A further former barn is also built of magnesian limestone, with brick dressings, quoins, and a hipped stone slate roof. There is a single tall storey and three bays, and the building contains a central cart entrance with a segmental brick arch and slit vents.

== See also ==
- Grade II* listed buildings in North Yorkshire (district)
- Listed buildings in Walden Stubbs
