= 2014 Wakefield Metropolitan District Council election =

2014 UK local government election

2014 local election results in Wakefield

The 2014 Wakefield Metropolitan District Council elections were held on 22 May 2014 to elect members of Wakefield Metropolitan District Council in West Yorkshire, England. One third of the council was up for election.

== Council Make-up ==
The make up of the Council following the election was:

Party political make-up of Wakefield Council
Party	Seats			Current Council (2014)
Party	2011	2012	2014	Current Council (2014)
Labour	40	52	54	
Conservative	20	11	6	
UKIP	0	0	2	
Independent	3	0	1	

== Summary of Result ==
Wakefield local election result 2014
Party	Seats	Gains	Losses	Net gain/loss	Seats %	Votes %	Votes	+/−
Labour	17	3	1	+2	81	47.6	35,781	-8.6
UKIP	2	2	0	+2	10	22.3	16,797	+14.4
Conservative	1	0	5	-5	5	21.9	16,484	-1.7
Independent	1	1	0	+1	5	2.4	1,802	-4.1
Liberal Democrats	0	0	0	0	0	2.7	2,055	-0.6
TUSC	0	0	0	0	0	1.8	1,257	+1.7
Green	0	0	0	0	0	1.5	1,093	+0.4

- +/- compared with Wakefield Council election 2012.

== Ward results ==
=== Ackworth, North Elmsall and Upton ward ===
Ackworth, North Elmsall and Upton
Party	Candidate	Votes	%	±%
Labour	Allan Garbutt	1636	43.2	−18.8
UKIP	Anne Arundel	1312	34.6	N/A
Conservative	Don Marshall	841	22.2	−15.4
Majority		324	8.6	−16.2
Turnout		3789	30.2	+3.3
Labour hold		Swing		

=== Airedale and Ferry Fryston ward ===
Airedale and Ferry Fryston
Party	Candidate	Votes	%	±%
Labour	Kathryn Scott	1564	54.4	−18.9
UKIP	William Proctor	1049	36.5	+16.1
Conservative	Mellisa Omer	262	9.1	+2.8
Majority		515	17.9	−35.0
Turnout		2875	25.0	+1.5
Labour hold		Swing		

=== Altofts and Whitwood ward ===
Altofts and Whitwood
Party	Candidate	Votes	%	±%
Labour	Jacquie Speight	1735	49.4	−12.2
UKIP	Tracie Corbett	1285	36.6	+12.6
Conservative	Anthony Hill	494	14.1	−0.3
Majority		450	12.8	−24.8
Turnout		3514	27.7	+1.9
Labour hold		Swing		

=== Castleford Central and Glasshoughton ward ===
Castleford Central and Glasshoughton
Party	Candidate	Votes	%	±%
Labour	Denise Jeffrey	1775	54.9	−21.4
UKIP	Dawn Lumb	1211	37.4	+21.5
Conservative	Eamonn Mullins	249	7.7	−0.1
Majority		564	17.5	−42.9
Turnout		3235	26.8	+2.0
Labour hold		Swing		

=== Crofton, Ryhill and Walton ward ===
Crofton, Ryhill and Walton
Party	Candidate	Votes	%	±%
Labour	Albert Manifield	1628	39.4	−27.9
UKIP	Steve Ashton	1462	35.4	N/A
Conservative	Allan Couch	817	19.8	−12.9
Liberal Democrats	Jonathan Pile	221	5.4	N/A
Majority		166	4	−30.6
Turnout		4128	34.1	+2.5
Labour hold		Swing		

=== Featherstone ward ===
Featherstone
Party	Candidate	Votes	%	±%
Labour	Dick Taylor	2681	80.6	−3.1
Conservative	Rodney Williams	647	19.4	+3.1
Majority		2034	61.2	−6.2
Turnout		3328	26.0	+1.2
Labour hold		Swing	-3.1	

=== Hemsworth ward ===
Hemsworth
Party	Candidate	Votes	%	±%
Labour	Sandra Pickin	1651	53.9	−3.6
UKIP	Penny Ashton	1121	36.6	+1.8
Conservative	Phillip Maxwell	291	9.5	+1.8
Majority		530	17.3	−5.4
Turnout		3063	26.1	+0.4
Labour hold		Swing		

=== Horbury and South Ossett ward ===
Horbury and South Ossett
Party	Candidate	Votes	%	±%
Labour	Janet Holmes	1622	41.3	+0.8
UKIP	Graham Jesty	1190	30.5	+20.0
Conservative	Margaret Holwell	828	21.2	−1.7
Liberal Democrats	Mark Goodair	214	5.4	−2.9
TUSC	John Vasey	67	1.5	N/A
Majority		426	10.8	−6.9
Turnout		3927	32.7	−1.2
Labour hold		Swing		

=== Knottingley ward ===
Knottingley
Party	Candidate	Votes	%	±%
Labour	Harry Ellis	1951	77.9	+8.2
Conservative	Rebecca Norris	555	22.1	+11.1
Majority		1395	55.8	+5.4
Turnout		2506	24.2	+0.4
Labour hold		Swing		

=== Normanton ward ===
Normanton
Party	Candidate	Votes	%	±%
Labour	Elaine Blezard	2192	74.6	+11.7
Conservative	Richard Wakefield	747	25.4	+13.5
Majority		1445	49.2	+11.5
Turnout		2939	23.6	+1.3
Labour hold		Swing		

=== Ossett ward ===
Ossett
Party	Candidate	Votes	%	±%
UKIP	Nick Farmer	1429	33.5	N/A
Labour	Gwen Page	1306	30.7	−18.5
Conservative	Ian Bunney	1175	27.6	−8.3
Liberal Democrats	David Smith	294	6.9	−8.1
TUSC	Simon Barraclough	56	1.3	N/A
Majority		123	2.8	−10.5
Turnout		4260	33.7	+1.8
UKIP gain from Conservative		Swing	+26.0	

=== Pontefract North ward ===
Pontefract North
Party	Candidate	Votes	%	±%
Labour	Clive Tennant	1645	48.6	+0.7
UKIP	Nathan Garbutt	1205	35.6	+24.9
Conservative	Amy Swift	463	13.7	−0.3
TUSC	Daniel Dearden	71	2.1	−0.1
Majority		440	13.0	−12.6
Turnout		3384	28.3	+0.2
Labour hold		Swing		

=== Pontefract South ===
Pontefract South
Party	Candidate	Votes	%	±%
Labour	George Ayre	1766	41.8	−8.6
Conservative	Geoff Walsh	1434	33.9	−2.8
UKIP	Terence Edward Uttley	957	22.6	+12.5
TUSC	John Gill	69	33.9	N/A
Majority		332	7.9	−5.8
Turnout		4226	35.5	−1.1
Labour gain from Conservative		Swing		

=== South Elmsall and South Kirkby ward ===
South Elmsall and South Kirkby
Party	Candidate	Votes	%	±%
Independent	Wilf Benson	1802	51.0	+12.4
Labour	Laurie Harrison	1471	41.6	−14.5
Conservative	Christian I'Anson	263	7.4	+2.1
Majority		331	9.4	−8.1
Turnout		3536	26.8	−0.6
Independent gain from Labour		Swing		

=== Stanley and Outwood East ward ===
Stanley and Outwood East
Party	Candidate	Votes	%	±%
Labour	Jacqui Williams	2064	52.3	−9.1
Conservative	Diane Wilson	1208	31.5	+3.6
TUSC	Dave Byrom	323	8.4	N/A
Liberal Democrats	Margaret Dodd	297	7.8	−2.8
Majority		796	20.8	−12.7
Turnout		3832	31.0	+2.6
Labour hold		Swing		

=== Wakefield East ward ===
Wakefield East
Party	Candidate	Votes	%	±%
Labour	Olivia Maria	1851	52.2	+1.3
UKIP	Steve Gilks	1009	28.5	N/A
Conservative	Haroon Khan	558	15.7	−1.7
TUSC	Michael Griffiths	127	3.6	−6.3
Majority		842	23.7	−7.9
Turnout		3545	30.4	1.8
Labour hold		Swing		

=== Wakefield North ward ===
Wakefield North
Party	Candidate	Votes	%	±%
Labour	Tracey Jane Austin	1462	44.0	−17.0
UKIP	Keith Frank Wells	995	30.0	+10.9
Conservative	Sophie Bracewell	551	16.6	+2.1
Liberal Democrats	Tony Sargeant	179	5.4	−0.1
TUSC	Adrian O'Malley	135	4.1	N/A
Majority		467	14.0	−27.9
Turnout		3322	30.5	+2.9
Labour hold		Swing		

=== Wakefield Rural ward ===
Wakefield Rural
Party	Candidate	Votes	%	±%
Labour	Kevin Edward	1707	39.1	−4.4
Conservative	Madalena Mestre	1632	37.4	−1.2
Green	Miriam Hawkins	589	13.5	+3.2
Liberal Democrats	Finbarr Cronin	279	6.4	−1.3
TUSC	Samuel Lynch	161	3.7	N/A
Majority		75	1.7	−3.2
Turnout		4368	32.5	−1.5
Labour gain from Conservative		Swing		

=== Wakefield South ward ===
Wakefield South
Party	Candidate	Votes	%	±%
Conservative	Nadeem Ahmed	1651	39.7	−8.1
Labour	Javed Iqbal	1243	29.9	−20.4
UKIP	Alan Hazelhurst	1000	24.1	N/A
Liberal Democrats	David Currie	202	4.9	−7.0
TUSC	John Sibbald	59	1.4	N/A
Majority		408	9.8	+2.3
Turnout		4155	39.2	+3.1
Conservative hold		Swing		

=== Wakefield West ward ===
Wakefield West
Party	Candidate	Votes	%	±%
Labour	Kevin Swift	1506	46.3	+3.2
Conservative	Kully Sanghera	885	27.2	−5.4
Green	Brian Else	504	15.5	+8.8
TUSC	Neil Taylor	189	5.8	N/A
Liberal Democrats	Susan Morgan	172	5.3	N/A
Majority		621	19.1	+8.6
Turnout		3256	29.1	−0.4
Labour gain from Conservative		Swing		

=== Wrenthorpe and Outwood West ward ===
Wrenthorpe and Outwood West
Party	Candidate	Votes	%	±%
UKIP	David Dews	1572	38.6	+13.3
Labour	Dayna O'Brien	1325	33.1	−13.8
Conservative	Anne-Marie Glover	933	23.3	−4.6
Liberal Democrats	David Arthur	197	4.9	N/A
Majority		217	5.5	−13.5
Turnout		3997	34.1	+2.3
UKIP gain from Conservative		Swing		
