= Listed buildings in Sykehouse =

Sykehouse is a civil parish in the metropolitan borough of Doncaster, South Yorkshire, England. The parish contains eight listed buildings that are recorded in the National Heritage List for England. All the listed buildings are designated at Grade II, the lowest of the three grades, which is applied to "buildings of national importance and special interest". The parish contains the village of Sykehouse and the surrounding countryside. The listed buildings include farmhouses and farm buildings, a church and a cross base in the churchyard, a bridge, and a former windmill.

== Buildings ==
Name and location	Photograph	Date	Notes
Cross remains 53.64481°N 1.04963°W	—	Late medieval	The remains of the cross are in the churchyard of Holy Trinity Church to the south of the church, and are in magnesian limestone. The base is tall and square with a deep chamfer around the top, and the shaft is octagonal.
Barn, Marsh Hills Farm; 53.64788°N 1.03239°W	—	1703	The barn is in red brick on a plinth, with a dentilled eaves course, and a pantile roof. There are two storeys and five bays. In the centre is a segmental-arched doorway with a chamfered, dated and initialled keystone, and above are two rows of slit vents and a decorative lozenge-shaped vent.
Holy Trinity Church; 53.64488°N 1.04963°W		1721	The oldest part of the church is the tower, and in 1867–69 C. Hodgson Fowler rebuilt the body of the church and added the pyramidal roof to the tower. The church is built in red brick with stone dressings and a slate roof. It consists of a nave, a north aisle, a south porch, a chancel with a north vestry, and a west tower. The tower has a two-light west window, a slit window, two-light bell openings with trefoil heads, and a pyramidal roof with a cross.
Marsh Hills Farmhouse; 53.64785°N 1.03266°W	—	Early 18th century	The farmhouse, later divided, is in red brick on a plinth, and has a pantile roof with coped gables and shaped kneelers. There are two storeys and attics, and five bays, the middle bay projecting. In the centre is a doorway with a fanlight under a flat arch with a keystone. Also, on the front are two French windows, and the other windows are casements.
Dovecote and outbuilding, West End Cottage; 53.63566°N 1.07010°W	—	Mid 18th century	The dovecote and attached outbuilding are in red brick, with stone slate eaves courses, cogged eaves, and pantile roofs with coped gables and shaped kneelers. The dovecote has three storeys, inserted garage doors, a segmental-arched doorway in the middle floor, and a bricked opening in the top floor. The outbuilding has two storeys, and contains doorways, decorative vents, and a gable window.
Tideworth Hague Farmhouse; 53.64284°N 1.03397°W	—	1758	The farmhouse is rendered with rusticated quoins, a floor band, and a Welsh slate roof with coped gables and shaped kneelers. There are two storeys and two bays. The doorway has a chamfered surround, and the windows are casements. Above the door is an inscribed and dated plaque with an open pediment.
Topham Ferry Bridge; 53.64926°N 1.06405°W		Early 19th century	The bridge carries a road over the River Went. It is in red brick with stone copings, and consists of a single segmental arch. The bridge has a band, parapets, and square end piers.
Tower Mill; 53.64880°N 1.05664°W		Early 19th century	A former tower windmill, later part of a house, it is in red brick, and consists of a truncated cone with a cogged band under an oversailing parapet. There are five storeys, and it contains a canopied porch, and casement windows in each floor. On the top is a glazed lantern.
