= Fenwick, South Yorkshire =

Village and civil parish in South Yorkshire, England

Coordinates: 53.6391°N 1.1016°W

Fenwick
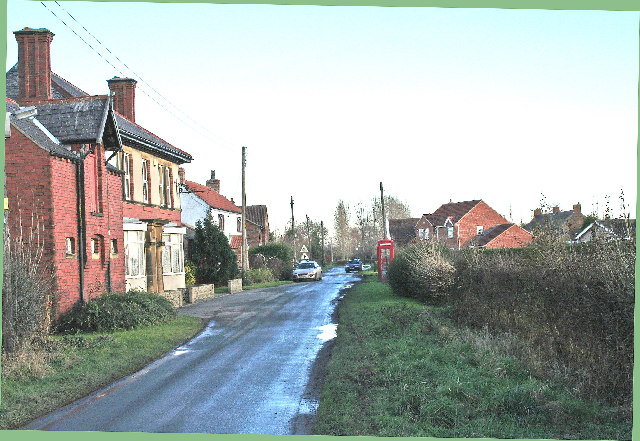

- Location within South Yorkshire
- Population: 121 (2011 Census)
- Civil parish: Fenwick
- Metropolitan borough: Doncaster
- Metropolitan county: South Yorkshire
- Region: Yorkshire and the Humber
- Country: England
- Sovereign state: United Kingdom
- Post town: DONCASTER
- Postcode district: DN6
- Dialling code: 01302
- Police: South Yorkshire
- Fire: South Yorkshire
- Ambulance: Yorkshire
- UK Parliament: Doncaster North

Fenwick is a small village and civil parish in the City of Doncaster, South Yorkshire, England, on the border with North Yorkshire. It was part of the West Riding of Yorkshire until 1974. It is located at an elevation of around 6 metres (20 ft) above sea level and had a population of 121 at the 2011 Census, a slight increase from 113 at the 2001 Census. The northern boundary of the parish is marked by the River Went.

The name Fenwick derives from the Old English fennwīc meaning 'trading settlement on the fen'.

== See also ==
- Listed buildings in Fenwick, South Yorkshire
