= Listed buildings in Darrington, West Yorkshire =

Darrington is a civil parish in the metropolitan borough of the City of Wakefield, West Yorkshire, England. The parish contains 16 listed buildings that are recorded in the National Heritage List for England. Of these, one is listed at Grade I, the highest of the three grades, and the others are at Grade II, the lowest grade. The parish contains the village of Darrington and the surrounding countryside. The listed buildings consist of houses and associated structures, two churches and items in the churchyard of the older church, a farmhouse, farm buildings, a former windmill, a former school, a bridge and a viaduct, a guide post, and a milestone.

== Key ==
Grade	Criteria
I	Particularly important buildings of more than special interest
II	Buildings of national importance and special interest

== Buildings ==
Name and location	Photograph	Date	Notes	Grade
Church of St. Luke and All Saints, Darrington; 53.67588°N 1.26723°W		Norman or earlier	The church, which was later extended and altered, and restored in 1879–80 by Arthur Blomfield, is built in magnesian limestone with slate roofs. It consists of a nave, north and south aisles, a south porch, a chancel with a north chapel, and a west tower embraced by the aisles. The tower has three stages, and contains a west doorway with a four-centred arch, above which is a three-light Perpendicular window. In the north side is a Norman window, on the south side is a clock face, and on the south and east sides are Norman belfry windows with two lights and a colonnette between. At the top is an embattled parapet with corner pinnacles. The porch is gabled, and contains an arched doorway with a cusped niche above, pinnacles on kneelers, and an apex cross. In the angle of the north chapel is a two-stage stair turret.	I
Pedestal and cross base 53.67582°N 1.26742°W		Late medieval (probable)	The pedestal and cross base are in the churchyard of the Church of St. Luke and All Saints, and are in magnesian limestone. The pedestal is octagonal with a square base and rounded corners. It is about 0.67 metres (2 ft 2 in) high, and has two moulded steps. On the top is a square socket holding a shaft with chamfered corners, about 1 metre (3 ft 3 in) high. On the top are the marks of a former sundial.	II
Wenthill Farmhouse; 53.65165°N 1.26434°W		1627	A farmhouse, later a private house, it is in magnesian limestone, partly rendered, and has a stone slate roof with coped gables and kneelers. There are two storeys and an attic, and an L-shaped plan, consisting of a single-bay range with an outshut at the rear, and a two-bay cross-wing, with a small gabled porch in the angle. The windows are mullioned, some with hood moulds, in the outshut is a dormer, and at the rear is a three-step mounting block.	II
Guide post 53.67032°N 1.28745°W		Early 18th century (probable)	The guide post at the junction of Hardwick Lane with Moor Lane is in magnesian limestone. It is a small square post about 38 centimetres (15 in) square and 60 centimetres (24 in) high, with eroded inscriptions on at least three sides.	II
Two Heaton monuments 53.67581°N 1.26710°W	—	Early 18th century	The monuments are in the churchyard of the Church of St. Luke and All Saints, and are to the memory of members of the Heaton family. They are both monumental slabs in magnesian limestone, and are rectangular and matching. Each has a scalloped semicircular band round the head, ending in scrolls at the feet, and incised inscriptions.	II
Grove Hall; 53.69103°N 1.26138°W		Early to mid 18th century	A large house, later extended and divided, it is in magnesian limestone and brick, it is rendered, and has tile roofs. There is an irregular plan, the principal range having three storeys and a symmetrical front of five bays, with a band, a moulded eaves cornice, and a hipped roof. Along the front is a verandah consisting of a colonnade of sandstone Tuscan columns, with a triglyph frieze, and a flat roof with railings. In the centre is a doorway with a moulded architrave, and a pediment on consoles. The wing to the right has two storeys and two bays, and contains a bow window. At the rear is a long wing, and the windows in the house are sashes.	II
Church House; 53.67578°N 1.26769°W		18th century	Originally a dovecote, it was converted into parish rooms in 1887 and later into a house. It is in magnesian limestone with some brick patching, a stone slate roof, and pantiles on the wing. There is an L-shaped plan, consisting of a main square block with two storeys and one bay, and a single-bay rear wing. The main block has a band and a pyramidal roof. On the south side is a Perpendicular-style window, under which is a lettered tablet. In the west side are two lancet windows, and elsewhere are other inserted windows and doorways. The wing contains two arched doorways and a casement window.	II
Mounting steps 53.67536°N 1.26698°W	—	18th century (possible)	The mounting steps are attached to the wall to the east of the lychgate of Church of St. Luke and All Saints. They are in magnesian limestone, and there are four steps on each side.	II
House opposite Church Lane; 53.67458°N 1.26751°W		Late 18th century (probable)	A sandstone house that has a tile roof with coped gables. There are two storeys, a front of five bays, and a rear wing on the left. The doorways have plain surrounds and fanlights, and the windows are sashes.	II
Stable block, Darrington Hall; 53.67347°N 1.26337°W	—	Late 18th century (probable)	The stable block and coach house are in magnesian limestone and have a stone slate roof with coped gables and kneelers. The building consists of a long range with two storeys and nine bays, incorporating a cottage at the right end. The stables have doorways with fanlights, and in the coach house are three segmental-arched coach entrances. The windows are sashes, and in the stable is a loading door.	II
Darrington Windmill; 53.67321°N 1.28407°W		Late 18th or early 19th century	The former tower windmill is in brick on a timber frame, and is conical with a basement and four stages. In the basement is a wide segmental-arched wagon entrance, there are two doorways in the first stage, an dwindows in each stage, some of them blocked. The superstructure is missing.	II
Went Bridge; 53.65026°N 1.26275°W		Early 19th century (probable)	The bridge carries the Great North Road (B6474 road) over the River Went. It is in magnesian limestone and sandstone, and consists of two low segmental arches. The bridge has rusticated voussoirs, a convex cutwater, a broad tapering pilaster, a band, a parapet with rounded coping, and rectangular terminals.	II
Darrington School; 53.67584°N 1.26815°W		Mid to late 19th century	The former school is in sandstone, on a chamfered plinth, with a slate roof, and is in Gothic style. There is a T-shaped plan, with a five bay range, and a south wing. The wing is gabled with buttresses, and contains a large transomed window with five cusped light, above which is a blind wheel window, and on the apex is a bellcote. The north front is symmetrical, and in the left return is a window similar to that in the gable.	II
Milestone; 53.65601°N 1.26617°W		Late 19th century	The milestone on the west side of the B6474 road is in sandstone with cast iron overlay. It has a triangular section, and on the sides are the distances to York, Doncaster and Tadcaster.	II
Church of St. John the Evangelist, Wentbridge; 53.65081°N 1.25926°W		1878	The church, designed by Arthur Blomfield, is built in magnesian limestone with red tile roofs. It has a cruciform plan, consisting of a nave with a south porch, north and south transepts, an apsidal chancel, and a tower at the crossing. The tower has one stage, and a steep pyramidal roof. The porch is gabled, and contains a doorway with a pointed arch and a moulded surround with dog-tooth decoration, above which is a carved lozenge.	II
Wentbridge Viaduct; 53.64898°N 1.25545°W		1961	The viaduct carries the A1 road over the valley of the River Went. It is in pre-stressed concrete, and has a continuous beam of three spans supported at the abutments, and with two raking legs hinged at the top and the bottom. The span between the bottoms of the legs is 308 feet (94 m).	II
