= Sykehouse =

Village and civil parish in South Yorkshire, England

- Village
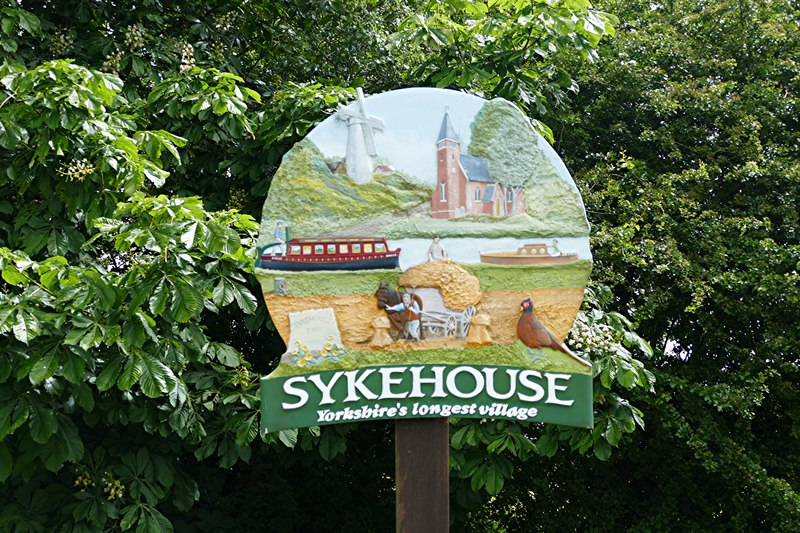
- Sykehouse village sign

- Location within City of Doncaster Location within South Yorkshire
- Area: 5.24 sq mi (13.6 km^{2})
- Population: 515 (2011 census)
  - Density: 98/sq mi (38/km^{2})
- Civil parish: Sykehouse
- Metropolitan borough: Doncaster
- Metropolitan county: South Yorkshire
- Region: Yorkshire and the Humber
- Country: England
- Sovereign state: United Kingdom
- Post town: Goole
- Postcode district: DN14
- Dialling code: 01405
- Police: South Yorkshire
- Fire: South Yorkshire
- Ambulance: Yorkshire
- UK Parliament: Doncaster North

Sykehouse is a village and civil parish in the City of Doncaster, South Yorkshire, England, on the border with the East Riding of Yorkshire. It was part of the West Riding of Yorkshire until 1974. It had a population of 438 in 2001, increasing to 515 at the 2011 Census.

The parish includes the hamlets of Eskholme, Pincheon Green, Topham and Wormley Hill.

The name Sykehouse derives from the Old English sīchūs meaning 'a house by a small stream'.

== Geography ==
Sykehouse is a largely rural area containing a handful of small hamlets. Its northern border is marked by the River Went, while the River Don marks its eastern boundary. The New Junction Canal bisects the parish. It is said to be the longest village in Yorkshire, as it stretches for nearly 8 miles (13 km) along its main street. Sykehouse is the origin of the extremely rare Sykehouse Russet apple, an old English variety which was thought to have been lost, but was rediscovered growing in gardens in Oxfordshire and the Doncaster area in 1999.

== Sykehouse village ==
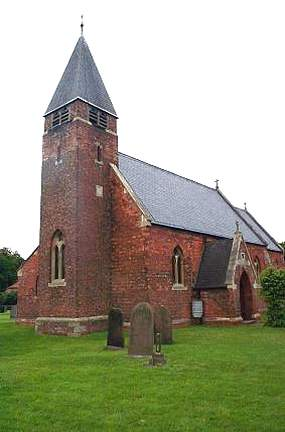
The Gothic Revival style church of the Holy Trinity

The village of Sykehouse contains the parish church of the Holy Trinity. Most of this grade II listed building was built in 1869 by C. H. Fowler, using red bricks and a Gothic Revival style. The tower is older, having been built in 1721, while the font is fifteenth century, but this is presumed to have come from elsewhere. Other listed buildings include a red-brick and rubble barn, attached to Marsh Hills Farmhouse, and the farmhouse itself, which is early eighteenth century with twentieth century alterations. Sykehouse also contains the Village Hall where numerous meetings are held; including: the Parish Council, Show Committee, Women's Institute, Cricket Club and the Parochial Church Council. The village is located at approximately 53° 38' 30" North, 1° 3' West, at an elevation of around 4 metres above sea level.

== Eskholme ==
Eskholme is a hamlet on the River Went, and is located at approximately 53° 39' North, 1° 0' 30" West, at an elevation of around 4 metres above sea level.

== Pincheon Green ==
Pincheon Green is little more than a small row of houses, and is located at approximately 53° 39' North, 1° 2' 20" West, at an elevation of around 4 metres above sea level.

== Topham ==
Topham is a rural hamlet on the River Went, alongside a dismantled railway. Also, because of its situation on the river; it is liable to flooding. It is located at approximately 53°38′40″N 1°3′40″W, at an elevation of around 5 metres above sea level. The main structure of an early nineteenth century tower mill, which is now part of a house forms part of the hamlet, and the track to Balne Lodge and Balne Hall crosses the River Went at Topham Ferry bridge, a single-arched brick structure built in the early nineteenth century and little altered, although in poor condition.

== Wormley Hill ==
Wormley Hill is a hamlet close to the River Don, and is located at approximately 53°38′20″N 0°59′30″W, at an elevation of around 4 metres above sea level. A friendly community of 8 houses, its history is embedded in agriculture with one farm still working. It is home to one of the Millennium Sykehouse signs and an original red telephone box.

== The Sykehouse Show ==
The Sykehouse Show is a traditional agricultural show which has taken place in Sykehouse annually since 1884, now held on the first Sunday in August. It is organised and run by the Sykehouse Show Society, which consists of a committee of around 25 volunteers including the chairman, secretary and treasurer. Many of the current committee are descendants of the first committee formed in 1884. A group of a further 20 volunteers assist around Show Day. It is a traditional village agricultural show, with classes for Shire horses, beef cattle; commercial, Jacob and Rare Breeds Sheep; ponies, hunters, Show Jumping and Gymkhana. The Sheaf Tossing Competition is a unique feature and very popular. There is a very busy arts & crafts Section and horticulture and agriculture marquee as well. With craft stalls and trade stands, including rides for children and refreshments.

== See also ==
- Listed buildings in Sykehouse
