= Little Smeaton, Selby =

Village in North Yorkshire, England

Coordinates: 53.6440°N 1.2060°W

Little Smeaton
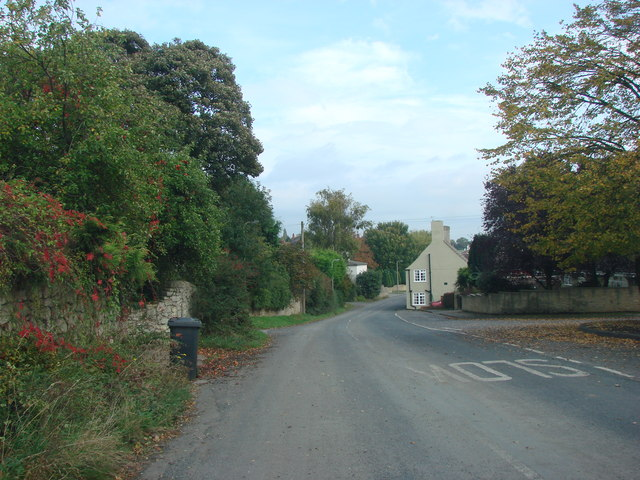
- Main Street, Little Smeaton

- Location within North Yorkshire
- Population: 283 (2011 census)
- Civil parish: Little Smeaton
- Unitary authority: North Yorkshire
- Ceremonial county: North Yorkshire
- Region: Yorkshire and the Humber
- Country: England
- Sovereign state: United Kingdom
- Post town: PONTEFRACT
- Postcode district: WF8

Little Smeaton is a village and civil parish in North Yorkshire, England. The population of the parish at the 2011 Census was 283. It is next to Kirk Smeaton and the River Went flows through it.

It was historically part of the West Riding of Yorkshire until 1974. From 1974 to 2023, it was part of the Selby District; it is now administered by the unitary North Yorkshire Council.

== Etymology ==
The name Smeaton is first attested in the Domesday Book of 1086, in the form Smedetone. This derives from Old English words smiþ (in its genitive plural form smiþa) and tūn ('farm, estate'), and thus once meant 'smiths' farm'. The little element of the name is first attested in Latin translation in forms like smitheton minori and parva smitheton in 1311, and in English in 1315 as litle smitheton. This element was added to the name to distinguish the settlement from nearby Kirk Smeaton.
