= Pincheon Green =

Hamlet in South Yorkshire, England

Coordinates: 53.6417°N 1.11°W

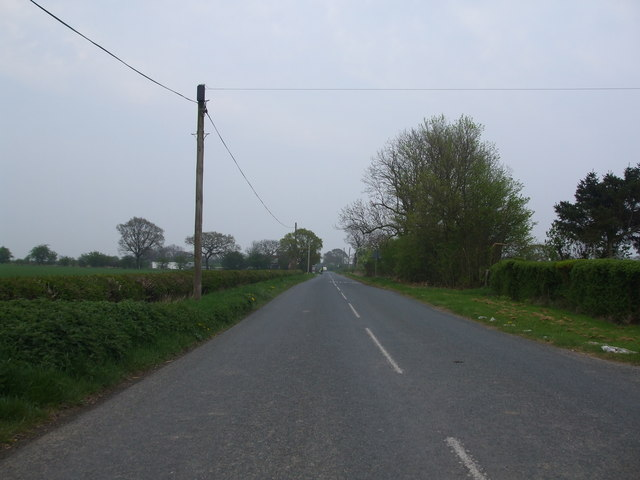
- Looking towards Pincheon Green along Pincheon Green Lane

- Location within South Yorkshire
- Civil parish: Sykehouse
- Metropolitan borough: Doncaster
- Metropolitan county: South Yorkshire
- Region: Yorkshire and the Humber
- Country: England
- Sovereign state: United Kingdom
- Post town: GOOLE
- Postcode district: DN14
- Dialling code: 01405
- Police: South Yorkshire
- Fire: South Yorkshire
- Ambulance: Yorkshire
- UK Parliament: Doncaster North

Pincheon Green is a hamlet in the Metropolitan Borough of Doncaster in South Yorkshire, England. It lies in the civil parish of Sykehouse, on the border with the East Riding of Yorkshire, and lies 4 metres (13 ft) above sea level.

The name is thought to derive from "Pinch(e)on", a surname which is a variant of Puncheon, and "grene", the Middle English word for a field or grassy place. It was first recorded on maps in 1817, and documented in Tithe Awards in 1841.

The hamlet is surrounded by waterways. To the east is the River Don, while to the west is the New Junction Canal. To the north are the Aire and Calder Navigation, (Knottingley and Goole section) and the River Went. Immediately to the north of the dwellings is the Sykehouse Main Drain. The drain flows from west to east, and is pumped into the River Don by Town Cloughs pumping station, managed by the Danvm Drainage Commissioners, an internal drainage board. Between the drain and the River Went, protection from flooding is provided by the Sykehouse Barrier Bank, which runs along the southern edge of the Went Lows washland. The washland floods when high levels in the River Don cause the pointing doors at the mouth of the River Went to close, preventing water from the Don flowing up the Went, but also preventing downstream flow on the Went from discharging into the Don.

Warren Hall is situated on the western edge of the hamlet. The moated site is a scheduled monument. Such sites were usually built in the Middle Ages, and consist of a wide ditch, often water-filled, which surrounded an island of dry ground, on which domestic or religious buildings were built. Warren Hall is unusual in that there were two islands, and the remains of a wooden bridge were discovered on the northern edge of the larger island when a slurry pit was being constructed on the farm in 1962. Some medieval tiles found on the site are in the Doncaster Museum. Warren Hall was mentioned in a lease dated to 1521, when William Copley took up residence there. Prior to that it had been the home of the Fitzwilliam family.
