= Wentbridge House Hotel =

Coordinates: 53.6511°N 1.2629°W

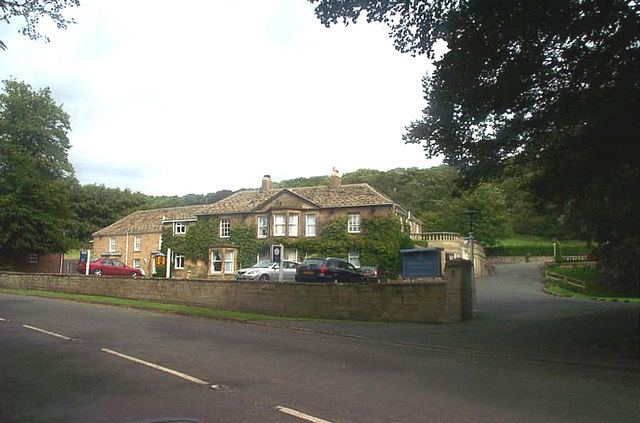
Wentbridge House Hotel

Wentbridge House Hotel is a hotel in Wentbridge, near Pontefract, West Yorkshire, England. It dates from 1700 and is built in the Georgian style. The house was occupied by many interesting people and was owned at one period by the Sayle family who lived in this area for several centuries. The property is now a hotel and provides accommodation, dining and function facilities

== Early residents ==
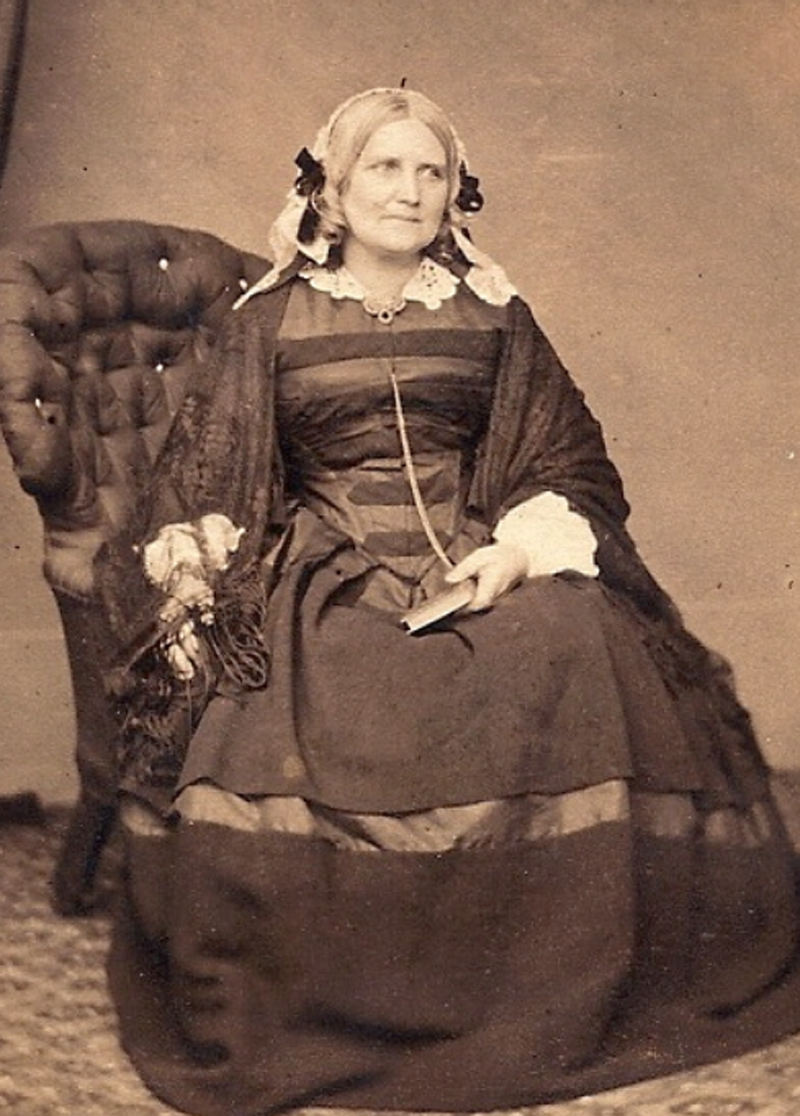
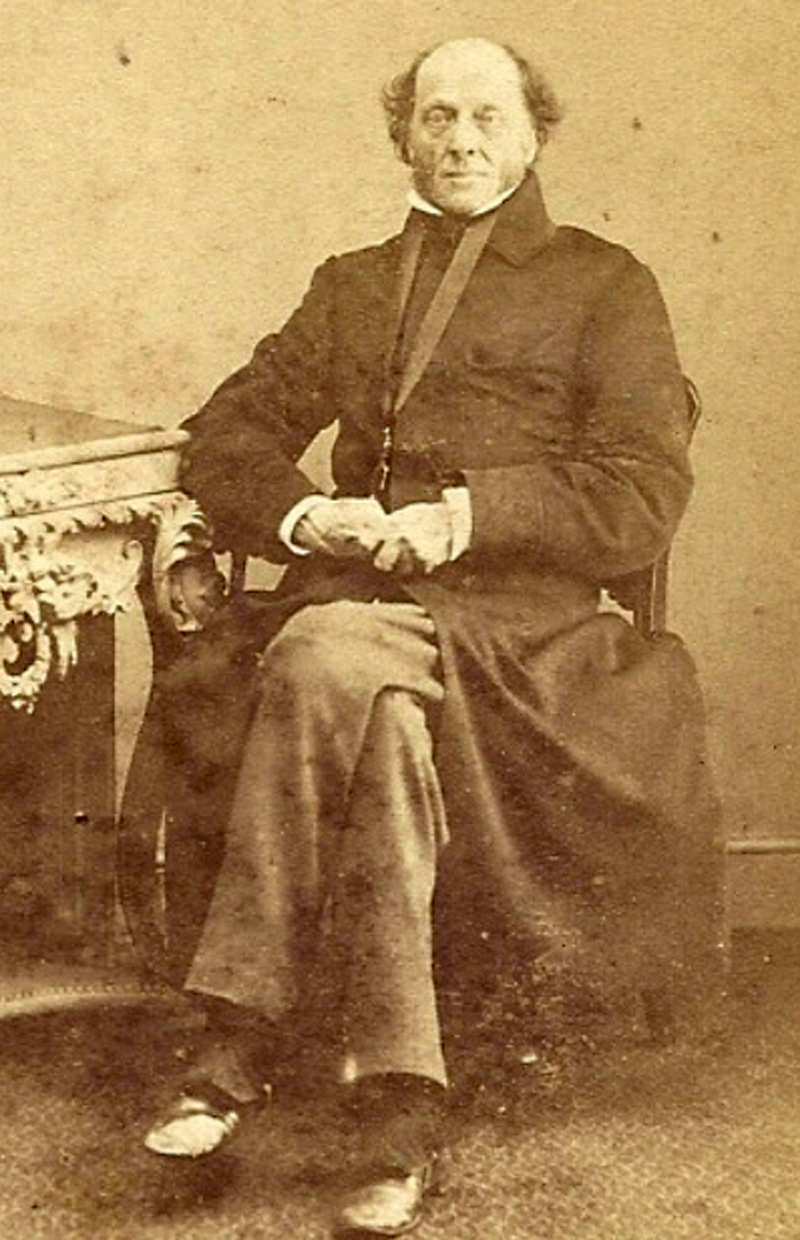
Emma and William Shaw resided at Wentbridge House from 1845–54

It is not known who built Wentbridge House but a map of 1736 shows that it was established by then and a date stone on the building indicates that it was constructed in 1700. Records reveal that around 1800 it was owned by the Sayle family. It was sold in about 1845 to William Shaw.

William Shaw was a wealthy land owner. He was born in 1819 in Almondbury, Yorkshire and in 1843 married Emma Bentley who was born in the same town. The couple had eight children five of whom were born at Wentbridge House. In 1854, William moved from Wentbridge and placed in a newspaper a rental notice which gives a good description of the house at this time. He subsequently sold the house to the Rev. Thomas Cator.

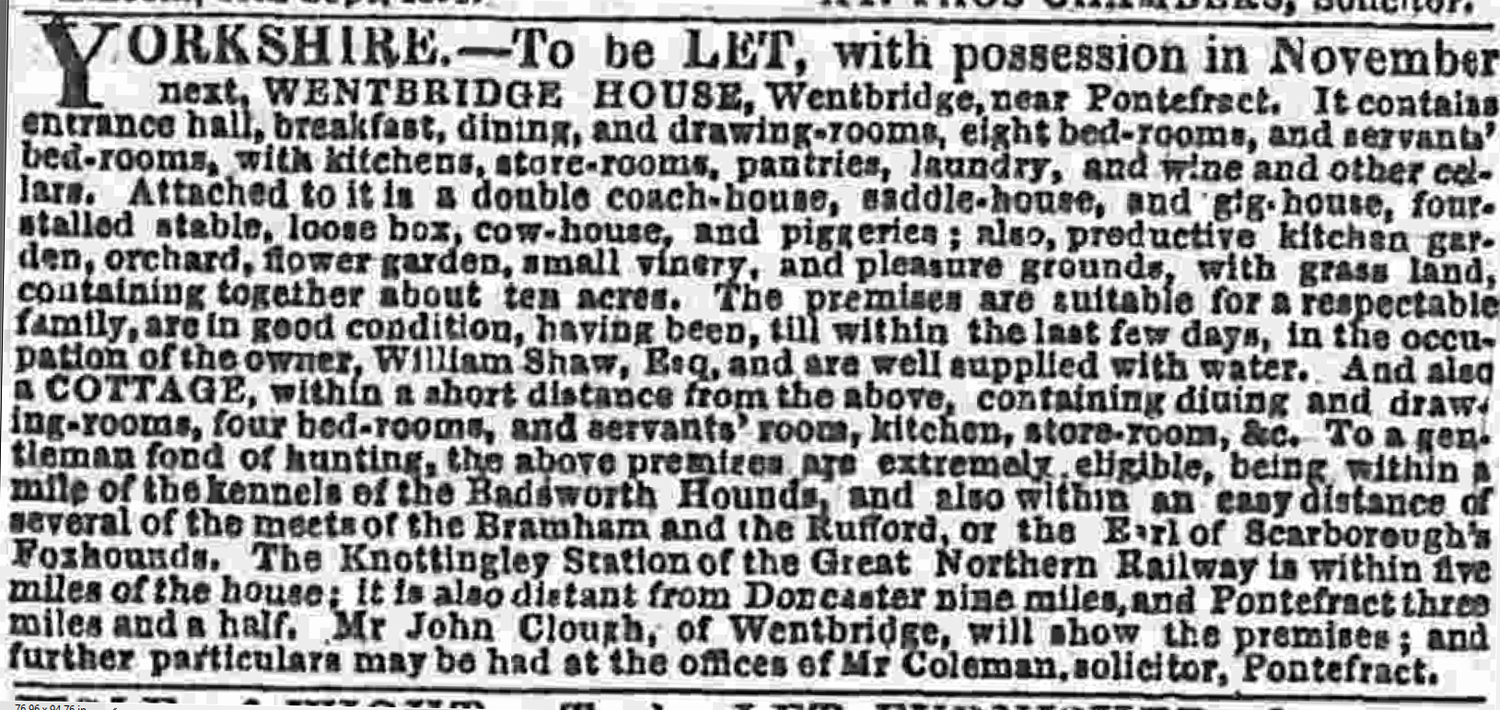
Rental Notice 1854

Thomas Cator was born in 1790 in Breekenham, Kent. He was educated at Cambridge and afterwards became a clergyman. In 1825 he married Lady Louisa Frances Lumley the daughter of John Lumley, 7th Earl of Scarbrough. Louisa inherited a great deal of money from her father in 1835 and the couple bought Skelbrooke Hall which is not far from Wentbridge and still exists today. In the 1850s they bought Wentbridge House and lived there until Thomas died in 1864. The house was then sold to Leonard Jaques who was recently married.

Leonard Jaques was born in 1839 in Easby House in Yorkshire. He was the eldest son and heir of Richard Machell Jaques who was a very wealthy landowner. In 1864 he married Agatha Eliza Whetham daughter of Colonel Whetham of Kirklington Hall Nottinghamshire. The couple lived at Wentbridge House until 1883 when it was purchased by Edmund Ernest Leatham.

== The Leatham family ==
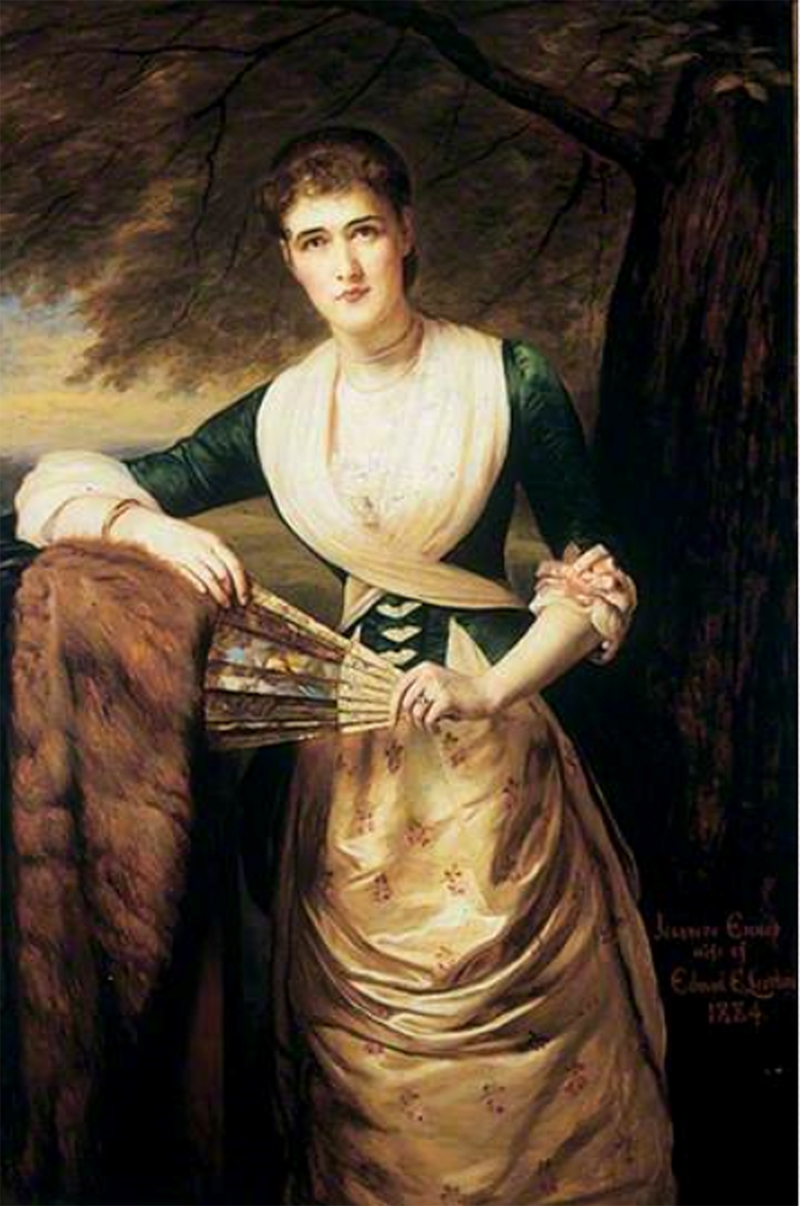
Jeanette Emmet Leatham

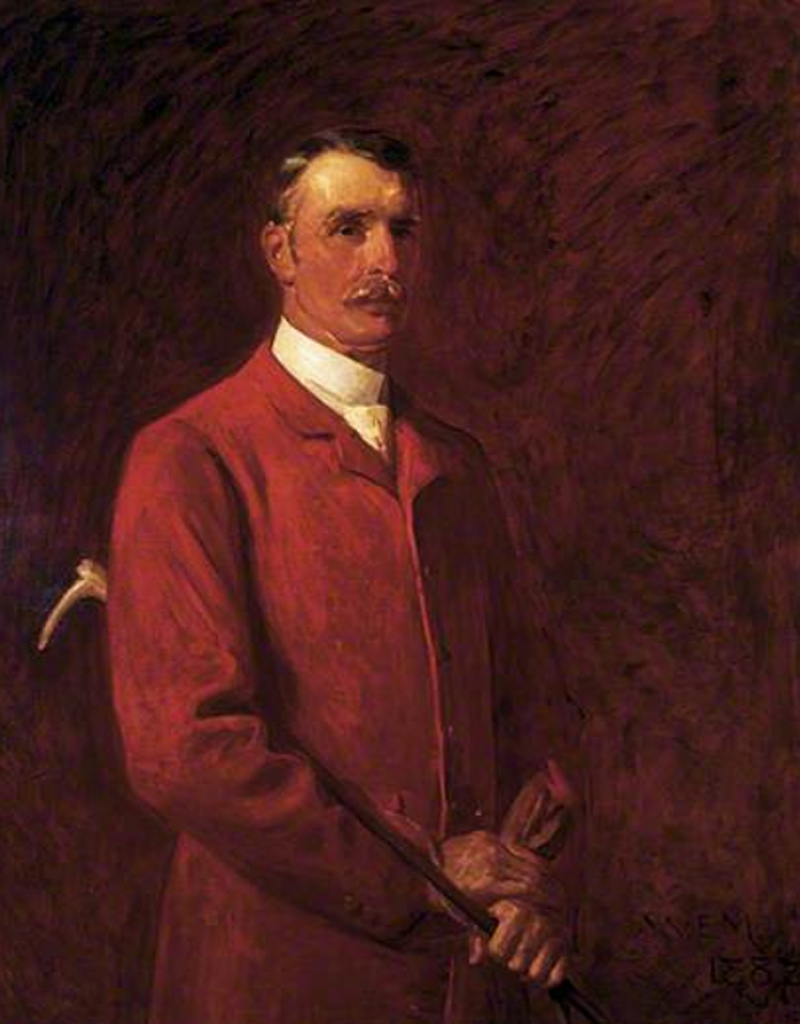
Edmund Ernest Leatham

Edmund Ernest Leatham was born in 1847 in Yorkshire. His father was William Henry Leatham who was a banker, politician and poet. In 1869 Edmund became a partner in the bank Leatham Tew and Co which later became part of Barclays Bank. In 1883 he married Jeannette Emmet Cunard who was the daughter of Sir Edward Cunard 2nd Baronet. Her grandfather Sir Samuel Cunard had founded the famous Cunard shipping line. The couple had three children one of whom was Lorna Pricilla Leatham.

In 1890 Edmund Leatham died but Jeanette continued to live at Wentbridge House. She remarried in 1896. Her new husband was Daniel Arthur Nielson who owned Hundhill Hall in Pontefract and was 14 years her senior. The couple lived at Wentbridge House until 1902 when Arthur died. They had two children one of whom was Harriette Margaret Neilson (known as Riette).

After Arthur’s death Jeanette continued to live at Wentbridge with her children from both of her marriages. She was known to be a philanthropist and she established and funded a convalescent home for children in Wentbridge for over twenty years. She died in 1919 and her children remained at the house. Riette Neilson married Victor Cochrane-Baillie, 3rd Baron Lamington in 1922. In 1935 Lorna married Sir Alvary Trench-Gascoigne and moved to his ancestral home Lotherton Hall near Leeds.

In 1946 the house was but on the market and bought by George Limnell Lyon who was the director of several shipping companies.

== Wentbridge House today ==
Wentbridge House was sold to the Select Group of hotels in 1987. The Page family subsequently purchased the property in 1993 and still own it today. The hotel now provides accommodation, restaurant facilities and function rooms for weddings and other special events.
