= Listed buildings in Fenwick, South Yorkshire =

Fenwick is a civil parish in the metropolitan borough of Doncaster, South Yorkshire, England. The parish contains seven listed buildings that are recorded in the National Heritage List for England. All the listed buildings are designated at Grade II, the lowest of the three grades, which is applied to "buildings of national importance and special interest". Apart from the small village of Fenwick, the parish is entirely rural, and all the listed buildings are farmhouses or farm buildings.

== Buildings ==
Name and location	Photograph	Date	Notes
Lily Hall, Riddings Farm; 53.64053°N 1.08592°W	—	Early to mid 18th century	A farmhouse, to which a cross-wing was added in about 1800, it is in red brick with a stone slate roof, and a T-shaped plan. The original range has two storeys and an attic, four bays, and a rear outshut. It contains a band, a doorway, horizontally-sliding sash windows in the left bays, and casement windows in the right two bays. The cross-wing is taller, and has two storeys and one bay. It contains a floor band, a doorway, and sash windows, and has coped gables with shaped kneelers.
Dovecote and outbuilding, Riddings Farm; 53.64056°N 1.08644°W	—	Late 18th century	The dovecote and outbuilding are in red brick, with stone slate eaves courses, and a pantile roof with coped gables and shaped kneelers. The dovecote at the north end has three storeys and one bay, and an eaves bad, and it contains windows in the two lower floors, and blocked pigeon holes in the top floor. The outbuilding has two storeys and five bays, and contains a segmental-arched doorway, casement windows, and hatches.
Barn and granary, Riddings Farm; 53.64064°N 1.08612°W	—	1781	The barn and granary are in red brick with an asbestos sheet roof. There are two storeys, the granary has two bays, and the barn to the west has three. The granary has two doorways, one with a basket arch and the other with a segmental arch, and the windows have segmental arches. At the rear, external steps lead to an upper floor doorway, and there are cruciform vents. The barn contains two hatches and three decorative vents, and has dentilled eaves, and coped gables with shaped kneelers.
Fenwick Hall; 53.64002°N 1.08190°W	—	c. 1800	A farmhouse on a moated site, now in ruins, it is in roughcast red brick, with a floor band, and a stone slate eaves courses. There are two storeys and an attic, and a U-shaped plan consisting of an entrance range of three bays, and two rear wings. In the entrance front is a central recess containing a doorway with a fanlight, and the windows are sashes.
Barn and outbuildings, Fenwick Hall; 53.63998°N 1.08161°W	—	c. 1800	The farm buildings are in red brick with a stone slate eaves course and pantile roofs. They form an L-shaped plan, consisting of a two-storey eight-bay barn, a lower two-storey three-bay stable at the south, and a single-story five-bay cowhouse at right angles. The barn has a hipped roof, and it contains doorways with cambered heads and quoined surrounds, vents, and hatches. The stable contains doorways and casement windows, and in the cowhouse are doorways with quoined jambs and external steps.
Shelter shed and loose box, Fenwick Hall; 53.63965°N 1.08175°W	—	c. 1800	The farm buildings are in red brick, partly with a stone slate eaves course, and with pantile roofs. They have a single storey and form an L-shaped plan, the loose box with two bays, and the shed with five bays on the front and three in the right return, The shed has an open front, with stone monolithic piers on plinths and padstones, and the loose box has two segmental-arched doorways.
Farm building, Lady Thorpe; 53.62725°N 1.12282°W	—	Early 19th century	A combination farm building, it is in red brick on a stone plinth, with cogged eaves, and sheeting on a hipped roof. There are two storeys and seven bays, the middle three bays projecting at the front and rear. The building contains round-arched recesses, wide openings and casement windows with cambered heads, and hatches, and at the rear are external steps.
