= Listed buildings in Thorpe Audlin =

Thorpe Audlin is a civil parish in the metropolitan borough of the City of Wakefield, West Yorkshire, England. The parish contains six listed buildings that are recorded in the National Heritage List for England. All the listed buildings are designated at Grade II, the lowest of the three grades, which is applied to "buildings of national importance and special interest". The parish contains the hamlet of Thorpe Audlin and the surrounding countryside. The listed buildings consist of tow former manor houses, three farm buildings, and a milepost.

== Buildings ==
Name and location	Photograph	Date	Notes
Thorpe Manor; 53.63711°N 1.27513°W	—	16th century or earlier	A manor house, later enlarged and altered, and then a private house. It is in roughcast sandstone and has Welsh slate roofs, with coped gables. There are two storeys, cellars and attics, and the house consists of two parallel ranges with later additions. There are coupled gables on the east, south and west sides with linking parapets. Most of the windows are mullioned, with some mullions missing, and some have been replaced by sashes.
Rogerthorpe Manor; 53.63170°N 1.29193°W		17th century	A manor house, later a hotel, most of the building dates from the 19th century. It is in sandstone with quoins and stone slate roofs. There are two storeys, and the south front is symmetrical with a plinth, hood moulds, and a central gabled two-storey porch. The outer doorway is round-headed with a decorated architrave, and the inner doorway is round-headed with a fanlight. The porch is flanked by two-storey canted bay windows containing mullioned and transomed windows.
Barn at Rogerthorpe Manor Farm; 53.632332°N 1.29154°W	—	17th century	The barn is in sandstone with quoins and roofs partly in stone slate and partly in pantiles, with gable coping. There is an L-shaped plan, consisting of a ten-bay range and an eight-bay wing at right angles. The openings include wagon entries, doorways, windows and slit vents.
Three-storey farm building, Manor Farm; 53.63675°N 1.27440°W	—	Early 18th century (probable)	A multifunctional farm building, it is in limestone with a stone slate roof, and there is an added cart shed with a pantile roof. The building has three storeys, three bays, a two-bay cart shed, and external steps on the southwest. The openings include doorways, windows, and a square opening in the southwest gable to a pigeon loft.
Threshing barn, Manor Farm; 53.63657°N 1.27456°W	—	Early 18th century (probable)	The threshing barn is in limestone with a stone slate roof. In the north front is a central cart entrance with quoined surround and a massive hewn timber lintel. The other doorways, including a central door in the south front, have stone lintels. The openings include windows and slit vents.
Milepost; 53.63771°N 1.26960°W		Late 19th century	The milepost is on the northeast side of Doncaster Road (A639 road). It is in sandstone with cast iron overlay, and has a triangular plan and a rounded top. On the top is inscribed "BARNSDALE & LEEDS ROAD" and "THORPE AUDLIN", and on the sides are the distances to Doncaster, Wetherby. Leeds, Aberford, and Pontefract.
