= Darrington, West Yorkshire =

Village and civil parish in West Yorkshire, England

Coordinates: 53°40′N 1°15′W

Darrington
- Village
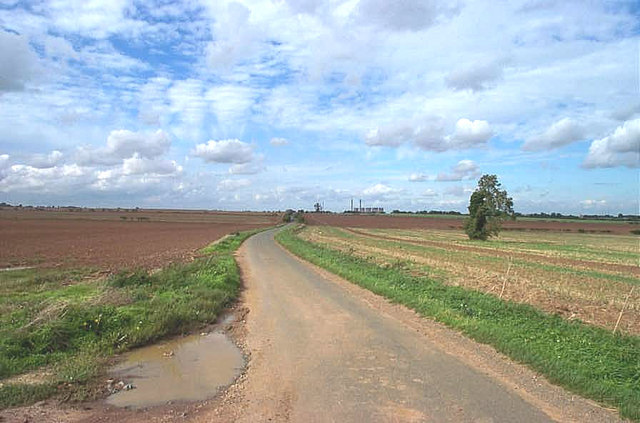
- Darrington – Westfield Lane

- Location within West Yorkshire
- Population: 1,403 (2011 Census)
- OS grid reference: SE484200
- Metropolitan county: West Yorkshire
- Region: Yorkshire and the Humber
- Country: England
- Sovereign state: United Kingdom
- Post town: PONTEFRACT
- Postcode district: WF8
- Police: West Yorkshire
- Fire: West Yorkshire
- Ambulance: Yorkshire

Darrington is a small village and civil parish in the City of Wakefield in West Yorkshire, England, 3 miles (4.8 km) from Pontefract and 25 miles (40 km) from the city of York. The village is split in two by the busy A1 trunk road which runs from London to Scotland. The 2011 census population was 1,403.

== History ==
The history of Darrington can be traced back to the time of Edward the Confessor. The last Anglo Saxon owners of Darrington were named Jordan, Baret and Alsi. After the Norman conquest it fell to the ownership of Ilbert de Lacy, a favourite of William the Conqueror. The village was recorded in the Domesday Book as Darnintone, which means the town of Daegheard's people.

Darrington was on the old Great North Road, and was 175 miles (282 km) north of London. The A1 bypass to the east end of the civil parish was built in the 1970s.

== Notable residents ==
Novelist, historian and Fellow of the Royal Historical Society, J. S. Fletcher (Joseph Smith Fletcher) was brought up in Darrington.

== Darrington today ==
At the heart of the village is the village shop, the Spread Eagle pub, church and the school. Darrington Church of England Junior School has over 100 pupils and was rated as Good by Ofsted in 2019. Darrington is home to the Mid-Yorkshire Golf Club, the Kyte Hotel, the Darrington pub and hotel, the Spread Eagle public house, a branch of Ripon Farm Services and Darrington Quarries.

The village has a community playing field which is home to the 'Feast and Fayre' once a year; this has a collection of stalls, a bouncy castle, dancing and many other types of entertainment. There is also a 5-mile (8 km) run on the same day. This event brings in visitors from surrounding villages and raise money for the upkeep of the field and the purchase of new play equipment.

Although the Holly Cottage Post Office has closed, a post office is available on Monday morning only within the Church Reading Rooms on Phillips Lane.

=== St Luke and All Saints Church ===
Next to the school is the 13th century parish church of St Luke and All Saints, for the parish of Darrington with Wentbridge in the Benefice of the Went Valley. Booklets of monumental inscriptions from the churchyard and that of Wentbridge are available here from the Pontefract & District Family History Society. Church records are kept at the West Yorkshire County Archives. The building was restored in 1855, and local people including antiquarians complained strongly of damage to historical features. Fine workmanship on rare stone effigies in the north chancel aisle had been "obliterated" by liberal use of whitewash. A Norman arch between nave and tower had been partially removed to make way for a large pew. A "considerable quantity" of carved oak furniture and woodwork had been sold and dispersed. A "highly interesting stone effigy of a "recumbent figure in armour" had "mysteriously disappeared."

== Governance ==
Darrington is in its own civil parish and part of the Pontefract South Ward. It is represented at Westminster as part of the Normanton, Pontefract and Castleford Constituency.

Population of Darrington 1801–2011
1801	1811	1821	1831	1841	1851	1861	1871	1881	1891	1901	1911	1921	1931	1951	1961	2011
480	444	619	619	668	617	744	626	643	625	527	514	527	445	497	575	1,403

== See also ==
- Listed buildings in Darrington, West Yorkshire

== Sources ==
- Fletcher, J. S. (1993) [1917]. Memorials of a Yorkshire parish : a historical sketch of the parish of Darrington. Old Hall. OCLC 656138990.
