= Topham, South Yorkshire =

Hamlet in South Yorkshire, England

Topham
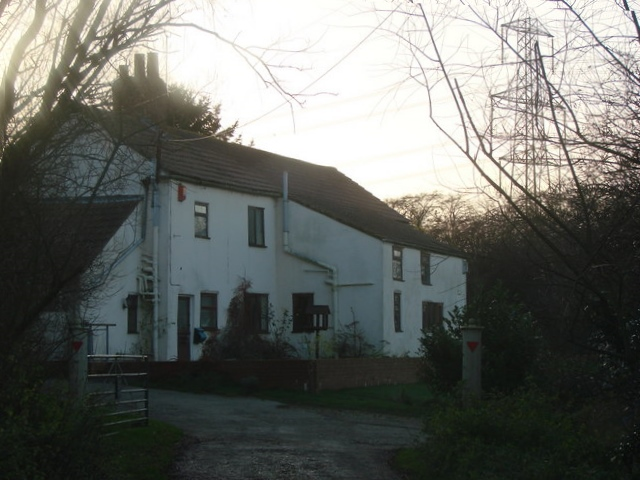
- Topham Ferry Farm

- Location within South Yorkshire
- Civil parish: Sykehouse
- Metropolitan borough: Doncaster
- Metropolitan county: South Yorkshire
- Region: Yorkshire and the Humber
- Country: England
- Sovereign state: United Kingdom
- Post town: GOOLE
- Postcode district: DN14
- Dialling code: 01405
- Police: South Yorkshire
- Fire: South Yorkshire
- Ambulance: Yorkshire
- UK Parliament: Doncaster North

Topham is a small rural hamlet upon the River Went in rural Yorkshire within the Metropolitan Borough of Doncaster in northern England. The hamlet runs along the Trans-Pennine Trail.

== Geography ==
Topham is a rural hamlet on the River Went, a tributary of the River Don; alongside a dismantled railway. Also, because of its situation on the river; it is liable to flooding. It is located at approximately 53°38′40″N 1°3′40″W, at an elevation of around 5 metres above sea level. The area around Topham is extremely flat with very few hills or inclines.

== Overview ==
The hamlet includes the main structure of an early nineteenth century tower mill, which is now part of a house. The track to Balne Lodge and Balne Hall crosses the River Went at Topham Ferry bridge, a single-arched brick structure built in the early nineteenth century and little altered, although in poor condition.
