= River Went =

River in England

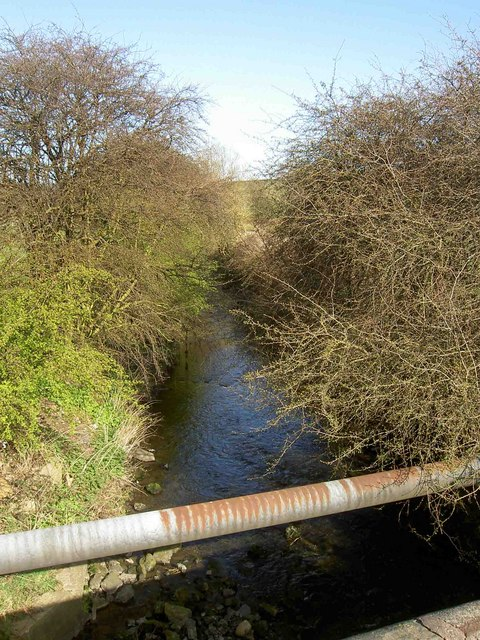
- The river seen from Standing Flat bridge

Location
- Country: England

Physical characteristics
- Source
  - location: Streethouse
  - elevation: 160 feet (49 m)
- Mouth
  - location: River Don, Pincheon Green
  - elevation: 0 feet (0 m)
- Length: 16 mi (26 km)

The River Went is a river in Yorkshire, England. It rises close to Featherstone and flows eastward, joining the River Don just to the north of Pincheon Green.

The river is classified as a main river by the Environment Agency, and is therefore their responsibility. Drainage of the surrounding low level land is managed by the Danvm Drainage Commissioners, an internal drainage board. Most of the drainage ditches for which they are responsible empty into the Went by gravity, but they also manage six pumping stations in the catchment of the Went. These pump water from areas where mining subsidence from the extraction of coal has resulted in land too low to drain by gravity, and are funded by the Coal Authority. At its mouth, the river enters the River Don through a pair of pointing doors, which are designed to close to prevent high levels in the Don from passing up the Went and causing flooding.

Historically, the river has provided the power for at least five water mills, which processed corn. The building of four of them no longer exist, but that at Norton is part of a Manorial estate. The estate is a scheduled monument, while the mill is a grade II listed building, as are several of the bridges that cross the river. This includes the Wentbridge Viaduct, which opened in 1961 to carry the Ai road at high level over the valley of the Went, replacing a previous low level bridge.

The river became seriously polluted in the late 1800s and early 1900s, as a result of mining and population growth, resulting in all fish stocks dying out. Since the 1970s, efforts have been made to improve the water quality, and a programme of releasing fish from elsewhere has enabled self-sustaining populations of coarse fish to flourish in the river. In the 21st century, the Yorkshire Wildlife Trust and other organisations have been working on remediation projects on the upper river, to overcome the worst effects of opencast mining. The aim is to create habitat where game fish such as trout can spawn.

== Route ==
The river rises at Streethouse, just to the west of Featherstone, and close to the 160-foot (49 m) contour. It is called Went Beck at this point, and flows generally eastwards, to the south of Featherstone. Just before it is crossed by the B6428 at Little Went bridge, it is joined by Hardwick Beck, flowing north-eastwards from the lakes of Nostell Park, once the site of Nostell Priory, but now containing a grade I listed Palladian house owned by the National Trust. It then flows between High Ackworth and Ackworth Moor Top, before being joined by Hoyle Mill Stream on the right bank, which flow around Fitzwilliam and through Hoyle Mill Dam. The combined flow is crossed by Low Ackworth railway viaduct.

Continuing eastwards, it is crossed by the A639 road, which follows the course of a Roman road at this point. The bridge is called Standing Flat bridge, and is just to the north of Thorpe Audlin. The bridge is one of four possible locations suggested by archaeologists and historians for the Battle of Winwaed, when King Oswiu and his troops defeated the Anglo-Saxon pagan king Penda and his army. Of the four sites, Whinmoor near Leeds and the bridge over the Went are the most likely, but neither has been conclusively proved to be the site of the battle.

The next crossing is the B6474 as it enters Wentbridge. The grade II listed bridge has two arches, made of rockfaced magnesian limestone and sandstone ashlar blocks, and is probably early nineteenth century. The A1 road bypasses Wentbridge to the east, and is carried over the river by Wentbridge Viaduct. This was designed by F. A. Sims, who was the senior designer and resident engineer for the bridges department of the West Riding County Council, and it was opened in 1961. It consists of a continuous beam, supported at its ends and by two sloping legs, which are hinged at both ends. The side spans are 140 feet (43 m) long, while the centre span is 190 feet (58 m) long. It was probably the first bridge in England to use prestressing cables which did not pass through the concrete sections, and one of the first to use precast concrete hinges. When it was built, it was the largest bridge of this kind in Europe, and in 1964 the New York City Museum of Modern Art declared it to be a structure of significance in twentieth century engineering. It is grade II listed.

Soon the river is passing through Brockadale, a steep-sided, wooded valley, before reaching Kirk Smeaton, situated on its southern bank, and Little Smeaton, on its northern bank, near which a railway used to cross, which has now been dismantled. At Norton, it passes the site of Norton mill and Norton Priory before passing under Tanpit bridge, a single arched bridge constructed of dressed stone with brick lined soffits in the early nineteenth century. By the time it reaches another railway line, it is only 16 feet (4.9 m) above sea level, and the channel is embanked on both sides to prevent flooding of the surrounding low-lying land.

Beyond Went bridge, where the A19 road crosses, the river used to take a winding route round the southern edge of Stubbs Common, but a new straight channel has been made, which has counter drains on either side, to collect seepage through the banks. Lake Drain joins the river at Lake Mouth, just beyond the point at which the old course of the river rejoins the new. The Doncaster to Selby railway line crosses next, after which an early nineteenth century red-brick bridge carries a lane over its course at Topham. The river passes to the north of Sykehouse, where an aqueduct built in 1905 carries the New Junction Canal over it. At this point it is running parallel to the Aire and Calder Navigation, and soon it joins the River Don, which was diverted northwards in 1628 by the drainage engineer Cornelius Vermuyden, and then heads eastwards to Goole by way of the Dutch River.

== Land drainage ==
An outcrop of Permian Magnesian Limestone, some 3.7 miles (6 km) wide, runs across Yorkshire from Castleford in the north to Sprotborough in the south. Water flowing out of this aquifer provides a significant amount of the surface water that supplies the River Went. The river is designated as a main river by the Environment Agency. Drainage of the low-lying land in the river valley and the valleys of its tributaries, from the source of the river to the A1 road at Wentbridge is the responsibility of the Danvm Drainage Commissioners, an internal drainage board. The drainage ditches within this area mostly discharge into the Went by gravity.

However, there is an area of 12 acres (5 ha) to the south of Ackworth where the land is too low to support gravity discharge. The Commissioners maintain Ackworth School Pumping Station to raise water from this catchment into the river. Because the land is low as a result of mining subsidence, the Coal Authority funds capital works and maintenance of the station. The Environment Agency also have a pumping station at Wentbridge.

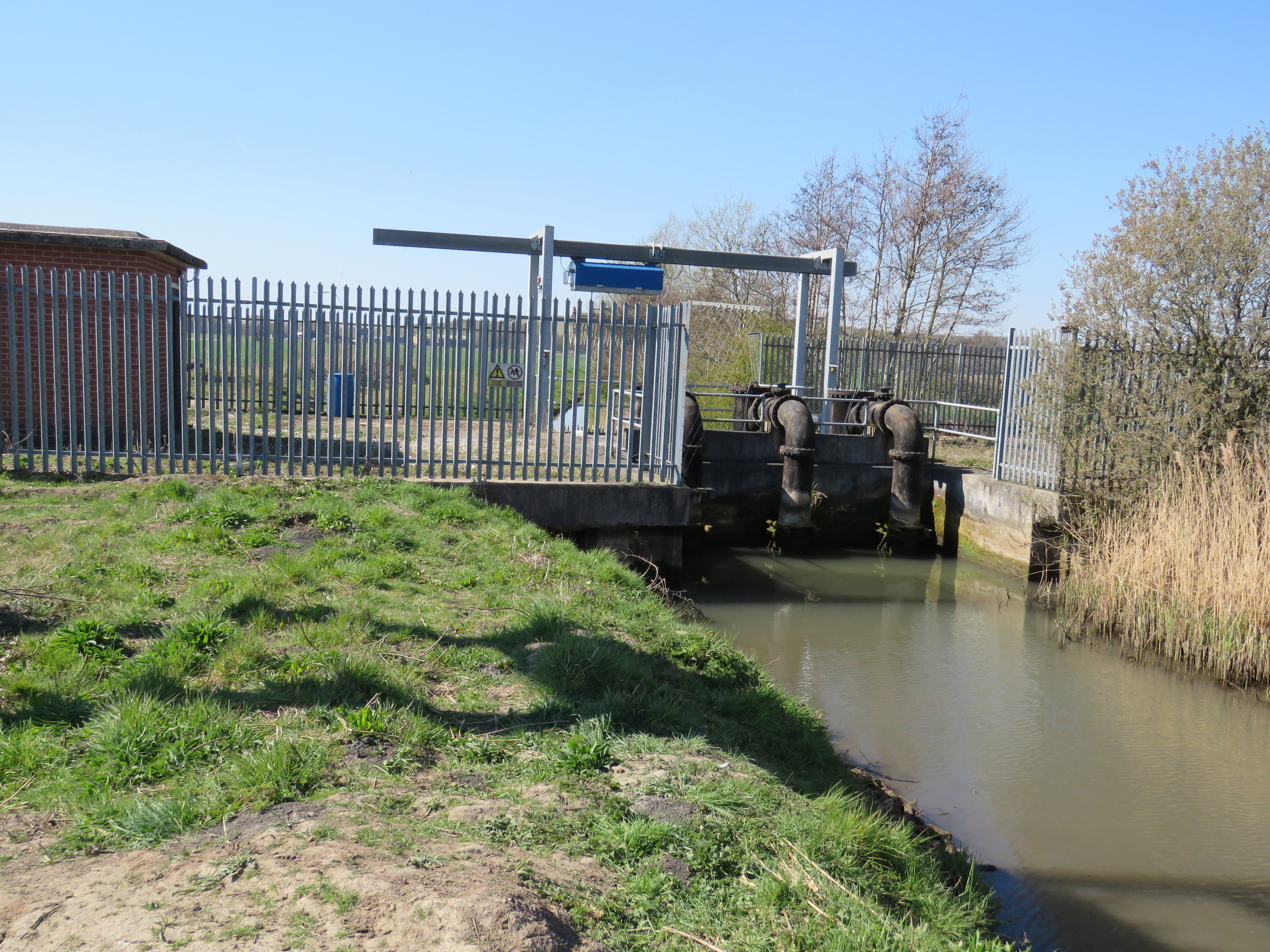
Fulham Lane pumping station lifts water into the final section of Blowell Drain

The Little Went, a tributary of the river, flows through countryside where the underlying rocks are middle coal measures sandstone. These are covered by a band of alluvium. There are two lines of springs which create marsh and wet grassland habitat. Because of the large number of wetland plant species that grow there, it has been designated at a Site of Special Scientific Interest, the Wentbridge Ings SSSI. At Brockadale, the river passes through a steep-sided valley as it cuts through the Magnesian limestone outcrop. The collection of plants growing on the limestone grassland are important, and form part of the Broackadale SSSI.

At Norton Common, a large loop in the river has been bypassed by a straight cut across the neck of the loop. The new channel is embanked, and the work was carried out in 1940 following subsidence caused by Askern Colliery. Water from Norton Common discharges into the old course of the river, and is them pumped through a pipeline by Norton Common Pumping Station, to discharge into the embanked channel. The control panels and incoming transformer at the pumping station are raised up, to prevent them being inundated during flood events, and the station is managed by the Danvm Commissioners. Further to the east, there is a gravity outfall near Topham.

Lake Drain forms the central spine of a network of channels which drain the villages of Womersley, Walden Stubbs and Balne. These include Birka Drain, Womersley Beck, Blowell Drain, Wood Lane Drain, Bradley Drain, Longwood Drain and Jenny Lane Drain. The Dauvm Commissioers maintain four pumping stations within the network, to cope with low-lying areas created by mining subsidence. These are Long Wood, Jenny Lane, Fulham Lane and Blowell pumping stations. Lake Drain pumping station pumps water from the end of Lake Drain into the Went. Fulham Lane pumping station is funded by UK Coal, and the other four by the Coal Authority. A small amount of water from the north of the catchment passes through a culvert under the M62 motorway to Beal Lane pumping station.

Near its mouth, the river flows through Went Lows, an area of washland bordering the river channel. There are a pair of pointing doors where the river enters the River Don, which are designed to close when high levels in the Don would result in water flowing back up the Went and causing flooding. When the doors close, water flows into the washlands, where the level continues to rise until it is sufficiently high for the doors to reopen. In extreme conditions, the doors have been known to remain shut for up to two weeks. The outfall is managed by the Environment Agency, and was upgraded in 1990, when a new concrete structure was constructed. As well as two sets of pointing doors on the downstream side, it also has two vertical penstocks on the upstream side, which can be closed if debris prevents the pointing doors for closing. Fenwick Fleet Drain normally discharges into the river through a flap value, but when water levels in Went Lows are high, the flap value closes to prevent reverse flow on the drain, and a storage area behind the value progressively floods.

== Milling ==
The River Went system once supplied water power to at least five watermills. The furthest upstream was Hoyle Mill, located on the Hoyle Mill Stream. to the east of Fitzwilliam. Hoyle Mill Dam is located at 118 feet (36 m) above ordnance datum (AOD) and covers an area of around 12 acres (5 ha), although in 1915 it covered 14.6 acres (5.9 ha). In Yorkshire and the surrounding areas, "dam" is used to describe the body of water formed by an impounding structure, rather than the bank that creates the pond or lake. The mill buildings had been demolished by 1914.

At Shepherds Hill bridge, now carrying the A638 road to the south of Ackworth Moor Top, Hoyle Mill Stream split into two, with the eastern branch following the modern course of the river, while the western branch is now marked by a public footpath that runs along the eastern edge of Ackworth Moor Top. It was one source of supply to Mill Dam, which covered an area of 1.45 acres (0.59 ha), with Ackworth corn mill on its northern edge. Mill Dam was also fed by Mill Canal, which left Hessle Beck. Shortly afterwards, Hessle Beck joined Went Beck, passing over a weir to become the River Went.

The next mill downstream was at Wentbridge. A weir on the right bank carried the flow of the river along a small channel to the south of the mill dam. By 1914, the mill buildings were no longer marked on maps, but the mill dam formerly supplied a corn mill.

At the time of the Domesday Book in 1086, Kirk Smeaton was a significant village with 59 households. It was listed as Smeaton, and probably included Little Smeaton, as there were two owners listed. One had a water mill valued at 2 shillings (2s or 10p), while the other had two mills, with a combined value of 9s 2d (46p). By 1914, there was a long mill dam to the south of the river, with a sluice where the two divided. It occupied an area of 1.016 acres (0.411 ha), and a corn mill was situated on the northern edge of Kirk Smeaton. The buildings are no more, but a public footpath runs along the southern edge of the former mill dam.

The only mill whose buildings still exist is at Norton. It was part of a large manorial complex, now a scheduled monument on the south bank of the river. The manor was owned by Ilbert de Laci when the Domesday Book was compiled, when the mill was worth 5 shillings (25p). A marriage settlement dated 1711 listed two water corm mills on the estate. There is evidence that the mill stream fed a moat, parts of which are still easily visible. The present Priory Mill dates from the early 19th century, although it is known to have been built over an earlier structure. The mill race left the river some 440 yards (400 m) upstream from the mill, and the mill race, mill pond and mill stream have been maintained. The mill building is grade II listed, and consists of two storeys and a loft, built in roughcast rubble with a pantile roof. The wheel house is to the rear, and contains a breast shot cast iron wheel with eight spokes, which is in poor condition.

== Ecology ==
During the late 1800s and early 1900s, the river was seriously polluted as a result of coal mining and the growth of population to support the mining operations. In many cases, villages developed around the mines and had inadequate or no sewage treatment plants, while the mines discharged mine water containing ochre, and large quantities of solids, which were deposited on the bed and choked vegetation. As a result, the fish population was almost entirely destroyed, and the river remained without fish until the 1970s.

The state of the Don was similarly lifeless, but by the 1970s, water quality in the lower Went was slightly improved, as a result of natural purification of the effluents being added to the river, and a small population of fish re-established itself. Most are thought to have been swept down the Don from still waters much higher up than the mouth of the Went, but they survived the transit downstream to take refuge in the Went. As water quality continued to improve, the fish became self-sustaining by the 1980s, and populations of roach, bream, perch and eels began to spread upstream. While these species were suited to the ponded nature of the river below Sykehouse, the river above there is faster flowing, and more suitable for riverine species of fish such as chub and dace. There was no chance of natural redevelopment of these species, as they had all been eliminated by the pollution.

In order to overcome this problem, the Yorkshire Water Authority Fisheries department searched for a source of chub and dace which could be re-introduced. An isolated population was eventually found on the River Ouse where Bishop Dike joins it at Cawood. They were netted, and in 1981, over 2,000 young chub and dace were released into the river at Askern, below the A19 road bridge. The operation was a success, as the fish colonised the river upstream and downstream from the release point, and soon became self-sustaining. As a consequence, the Went is now an excellent coarse fishery. There are also populations of chub and dace in the Don near Doncaster, which are believed to have originated from the Went.

Because open cast coal mining has taken place in the area, there are significant areas where the surface geology has been inverted, with subsoils containing clay now on the surface. The upper river is particularly affected by the consequences of this, with muddy stretches of river bed where the clay has clogged the gravel beds which would provide habitat for breeding fish. Some remediation work was carried out in the grounds of Ackworth School, which borders the river. This involved the introduction of gravel into the river, and the provision of woody materials, to alter flow rates and create scouring of the gravel so that it remains suitable for spawning. In 2020 the Wild Trout Trust surveyed some 270 yards (250 m) of the river above the school grounds to advise on further remediation work. The project is a collaboration with the Yorkshire Farming and Wildlife Partnership, the Environment Agency and the Yorkshire Wildlife Trust, who have been working on improvements to the river since 2014. As well as the introduction of gravel and woody debris, fencing to prevent livestock entering the river will be improved, and there is an ongoing project to work with farmers to reduce the amount of sediment entering the river.

== Water quality ==
The Environment Agency assesses the water quality within the river systems in England. Each is given an overall ecological status, which may be one of five levels: high, good, moderate, poor and bad. There are several components that are used to determine this, including biological status, which looks at the quantity and varieties of invertebrates, angiosperms and fish. Chemical status, which compares the concentrations of various chemicals against known safe concentrations, is rated good or fail.

The water quality of the Went was as follows in 2019.

Section	Ecological Status	Chemical Status	Length	Catchment	Channel
Went from Source to Hoyle Mill Stream	Poor	Fail	9.2 miles (14.8 km)	11.92 square miles (30.9 km^{2})	
Went from Hoyle Mill Stream to Blowell Drain	Moderate	Fail	14.3 miles (23.0 km)	19.59 square miles (50.7 km^{2})	heavily modified
Went from Blowell Drain to the River Don	Moderate	Fail	6.3 miles (10.1 km)	7.22 square miles (18.7 km^{2})	heavily modified

Reasons for the ecological quality being less than good include runoff from agricultural land, discharge from sewage treatment works, and physical modification of the channel, to provide flood production structures which impede the movement of fish along the river. Like most rivers in the UK, the chemical status changed from good to fail in 2019, due to the presence of polybrominated diphenyl ethers (PBDE), perfluorooctane sulphonate (PFOS) and mercury compounds, none of which had previously been included in the assessment.

== Points of interest ==
Point	Coordinates (Links to map resources)	OS Grid Ref	Notes
Mouth	53.6615°N 0.9907°W	SE667188	Junction with River Don
New Junction Canal aqueduct	53.6582°N 1.0182°W	SE649184	built 1905
Lake Mouth	53.6438°N 1.1258°W	SE578167	also end of new cut
A1 viaduct Wentbridge	53.6487°N 1.2551°W	SE493171	built 1961
Little Went bridge	53.6631°N 1.3560°W	SE426187	Junction with Hardwick Beck
Source of Went Beck	53.6750°N 1.4066°W	SE392200	near Streethouse

== Settlements ==
- Featherstone
- West Hardwick
- High Ackworth
- Ackworth Moor Top
- Low Ackworth
- Thorpe Audlin
- Wentbridge
- Kirk Smeaton
- Little Smeaton
- Norton
- Walden Stubbs
- Fenwick
- Balne
- Sykehouse
- Pincheon Green
