= Pontefract South =

Electoral ward in West Yorkshire, England

Coordinates: 53.67°N 1.26°W

- Location within West Yorkshire
- Metropolitan borough: City of Wakefield
- Metropolitan county: West Yorkshire
- Region: Yorkshire and the Humber
- Country: England
- Sovereign state: United Kingdom
- Police: West Yorkshire
- Fire: West Yorkshire
- Ambulance: Yorkshire
- UK Parliament: Pontefract, Castleford and Knottingley

Pontefract South is an electoral ward of the City of Wakefield district, used for elections to Wakefield Metropolitan District Council, in West Yorkshire, England.

== Overview ==
The ward is one of 21 in the Wakefield district and is one of its most marginal. Its marginal nature can be largely put down to the nature of its demographics. The ward takes in traditionally Labour-voting areas of Pontefract, in the form of Chequerfield, Baghill and the Carleton Park estate, along with more Conservative-leaning areas such as Carleton and the outlying villages of Darrington, Wentbridge and East Hardwick. Other areas of the ward, such as the Larks Hill estate, are probably the most locally marginal parts of the ward; their voters swing between Labour and the Conservatives from one election to another.

In December 2010, the ward's electorate stood at 12,090.

== Representation ==
Like all wards in the Wakefield district, Pontefract South has three councillors, whom are elected on a four-year-rota. This means that elections for new councillors are held for three years running, with one in every four skipped.

At present, the ward is represented by two Labour councillors, George Ayre and Brian Mayhew, and one Conservative councillor, Tony Hames. For over a decade, the ward was represented solely by Conservative councillors; however, at the local government elections held on 5 May 2011, Conservative councillor Philip Booth lost his seat to the late Tony Dean, meaning Labour gained representation in the ward once again.

At the local elections in May 2014, Pontefract local George Ayre (Labour) unseated the Wakefield District Conservative group leader of Wakefield Council, Geoff Walsh, to ensure the party held the majority of seats. In 2015, David Jones (Labour) replaced Tony Dean who retired that year. In 2018 and 2019 respectively, George Ayre and David Jones were re-elected.

David Jones served as Mayor of Wakefield from 2020 to 2023. He stood down in 2023 and Brian Mayhew replaced him.

Cllr George Ayre is the longest serving councillor for Pontefract South having been elected in 2014.

== Election results ==
Note: The turnout figures below are inclusive of spoiled ballots, except for the 2012 and 2016 results.

2023
Party	Candidate	Votes	%	±%
Labour	Brian Arthur Mayhew	1,658	50.0	
Conservative	Arnie Craven	1,244	37.5	
Green	Oliver Luke Watkins	164	5.0	
Liberal Democrats	Susan Hayes	163	4.9	
SDP	Trevor Lake	84	2.5	
Majority		414	12.5	
Turnout		3,313	28	
Rejected ballots		20		
Labour hold		Swing		

2022
Party	Candidate	Votes	%	±%
Labour	George Ayre	2,082	54.3	
Conservative	Stephanie Fishwick	1,305	34	
Yorkshire	James Craven	262	6.8	
Liberal Democrats	Susan Hayes	133	3.5	
Majority		777	20.3	
Turnout		3,834	32.2	
Labour gain from Conservative				

2021
Party	Candidate	Votes	%	±%
Conservative	Tony Hames	1,842	44.7	+4.5
Labour	Melanie Jones	1,712	41.5	−4.9
Yorkshire	Trevor Peasant	390	9.5	+9.5
Green	Katherine Dodd	178	4.3	+4.3
Majority		130	3.2	−3.0
Turnout		4,122	34.3	+6.0
Conservative gain from Labour				

2019
Party	Candidate	Votes	%	±%
Labour	David Jones	1,560	46.4	−5.8
Conservative	Tony Hames	1,351	40.2	−2.7
Liberal Democrats	Salli Martlew	450	13.4	+8.5
Majority		209	9.3	+3.2
Turnout		3,361	28.3	−3.6
Rejected ballots		160	4.76	+4.17
Labour hold		Swing		

2018
Party	Candidate	Votes	%	±%
Labour	George Ayre	2,000	52.2	+5
Conservative	Amy Swift	1,646	42.9	+1.8
Liberal Democrats	Daniel Woodlock	188	4.9	−0.1
Majority		354	9.3	+3.2
Turnout		3,834	31.9	
Rejected ballots		23	0.6	
Labour hold		Swing		

2016
Party	Candidate	Votes	%	±%
Labour	Celia Loughran	1,917	47.2	−1.9
Conservative	Geoff Walsh	1,669	41.1	−2.7
TUSC	John Gill	271	6.7	−0.4
Liberal Democrats	Daniel Woodlock	203	5.0	
Majority		248	6.1	+0.8
Turnout		4,060	35.3	−25.8
Labour hold		Swing		

2015
Party	Candidate	Votes	%	±%
Labour	David Jones	3,577	49.1	+7.3
Conservative	Geoff Walsh	3,196	43.8	+9.9
TUSC	John Gill	518	7.1	+5.5
Majority		381	5.3	−2.6
Turnout		7,291	61.1	+25.6
Labour hold		Swing		

2014
Party	Candidate	Votes	%	±%
Labour	George Ayre	1,766	41.8	−8.6
Conservative	Geoff Walsh	1,434	33.9	−2.8
UKIP	Terence Edward Uttley	957	22.6	+12.5
TUSC	John Gill	69	1.6	
Majority		332	7.9	−5.8
Turnout		4,226	35.5	−1.1
Labour hold		Swing		

2012
Party	Candidate	Votes	%	±%
Labour	Celia Loughran	2,222	50.4	
Conservative	Mark Crowther	1,617	36.7	−9.1
UKIP	Terence Edward Uttley	446	10.1	
Liberal Democrats	Douglas Dale	122	2.8	
Majority		605	13.7	+6.0
Turnout		4,407	36.6	−5.9
Labour hold		Swing		

2011
Party	Candidate	Votes	%	±%
Labour	Tony Dean	2,734	53.5	+17.1
Conservative	Philip Booth	2,341	45.8	+6.7
Majority		393	7.7	
Turnout		5,114	42.5	−20.5
Labour gain from Conservative		Swing		

2010
Party	Candidate	Votes	%	±%
Conservative	Geoff Walsh	2,978	39.1	−9.5
Labour	Jack Kershaw	2,773	36.4	−1.0
Liberal Democrats	Chris Rush	1,333	17.5	+4.0
Independent	Matt Haddleton	275	3.6	
Green	Neil Frankland	221	2.9	
Majority		205	2.7	−8.5
Turnout		7,612	63.0	
Conservative hold		Swing	−4.7	

2008
Party	Candidate	Votes	%	±%
Conservative	Mark Crowther	2,340	48.6	−0.9
Labour	Trevor Izon	1,801	37.4	+0.2
Liberal Democrats	Chris Rush	650	13.5	+0.8
Majority		539	11.2	−1.1
Turnout		4,810		
Conservative hold		Swing	−0.6	

2007
Party	Candidate	Votes	%	±%
Conservative	Philip Booth	2,241	49.5	+7.5
Labour	Bill O'Brien	1,685	37.2	−3.8
Liberal Democrats	Chris Rush	575	12.7	
Majority		556	12.3	+11.3
Turnout		4,524		
Conservative hold		Swing	+6.6	

2006
Party	Candidate	Votes	%	±%
Conservative	Geoff Walsh	1,852	41.9	
Labour	James Nicholson	1,810	41.0	
Independent	Clive Wigham	730	16.5	
Majority		42	1.0	
Turnout		4,420		
Conservative gain from Labour		Swing	+6.6	

2004
Party	Candidate	Votes	%	±%
Labour	Trevor Izon	2,474	17.6	
Conservative	Philip Booth	2,464	17.5	
Labour	James Nicholson	2,374	16.9	
Conservative	Richard Molloy	2,103	14.9	
Labour	Sylvia Burton	2,059	14.6	
Conservative	David Howarth	1,963	13.9	
BNP	David Redfearn	651	4.6	
Majority		10	0.6	
Turnout		14,088		
Labour gain from Conservative		Swing		

2003
Party	Candidate	Votes	%	±%
Conservative	Philip Booth	1,290	44.1	
Labour	Patricia Garbutt	1,270	43.4	
UKIP	James Marran	224	7.7	
Socialist Alliance	Alan Hyman	141	4.8	
Majority		20	0.7	
Turnout		2,925	27.9	−0.5
Conservative gain from Labour		Swing		

2002
Party	Candidate	Votes	%	±%
Labour	Trevor Izon	1,581	27.9	
Labour	Martyn Ward	1,317	23.2	
Conservative	Ian Bloomer	1,250	22.0	
Conservative	Philip Booth	1,243	21.9	
Socialist Alliance	Carol Ives	285	5.0	
Majority		264	4.7	
Turnout		5,676	28.4	+4.2
Labour hold		Swing		

2000
Party	Candidate	Votes	%	±%
Labour	Anthony Dean	1,250	48.6	
Conservative	Richard Molloy	1,023	39.8	
Liberal Democrats	David Arthur	297	11.6	
Majority		227	8.8	
Turnout		2,570	24.2	
Labour hold		Swing		
