= Walden Stubbs =

Village and civil parish in North Yorkshire, England

Coordinates: 53°38′40″N 1°10′09″W

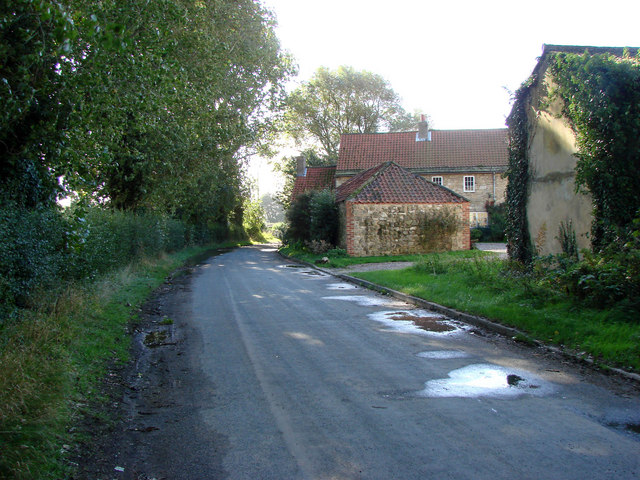
- A farm on the street through Walden Stubbs

- Location within North Yorkshire
- OS grid reference: SE551168
- Civil parish: Walden Stubbs
- Unitary authority: North Yorkshire
- Ceremonial county: North Yorkshire
- Region: Yorkshire and the Humber
- Country: England
- Sovereign state: United Kingdom
- Post town: DONCASTER
- Postcode district: DN6
- Dialling code: 01302
- Police: North Yorkshire
- Fire: North Yorkshire
- Ambulance: Yorkshire
- UK Parliament: Selby

Walden Stubbs is a small, rural village and civil parish in North Yorkshire, England. At the 2011 Census, the population was less than 100, so the details are included in the civil parish of Womersley. Situated close to the border with South Yorkshire, and north of Doncaster, it is 7 miles (11 km) south east of Pontefract, and lies close to the River Went, which rises at Featherstone.

The village is mentioned in the Domesday Book, where it is described as consisting of seven households and two ploughlands. The name of the village derives from either Old German, Waldin or the Old English son of Walda. The second part, Stubbs is the Old English term for tree stumps.

The village was historically part of the West Riding of Yorkshire and the rural district of Hemsworth until 1974. Under the Redcliffe-Maud Report, Walden Stubbs was originally due to be part of the "Mid-Yorkshire" district, which was roughly the same as the modern Wakefield district but was due to cover a larger area than was eventually established. Instead, from 1974 to 2023 it was part of the Selby District. It is now administered by the unitary North Yorkshire Council.

The Askern Branch Line runs through this village, which has two level crossings. This rail line now carries freight and passenger trains from London Kings Cross to Bradford Interchange. There is also the occasional diverted passenger train from the East Coast Main Line.

== See also ==
- Listed buildings in Walden Stubbs
