= Normanton, Pontefract and Castleford =

UK Parliament constituency (2010–2024)

- Former county constituency for the House of Commons
- 2010–2024 boundary of Normanton, Pontefract and Castleford in West Yorkshire

- Location of West Yorkshire within England
- County: West Yorkshire
- Electorate: 84,874 (December 2019)
- Major settlements: Normanton; Castleford; Pontefract

2010–2024
- Seats: One
- Created from: Pontefract and Castleford; Normanton
- Replaced by: Pontefract, Castleford and Knottingley; Normanton and Hemsworth (minor part)

Normanton, Pontefract and Castleford was a constituency (Note: A county constituency (for the purposes of election expenses and type of returning officer)) in West Yorkshire of the House of Commons of the UK Parliament. It was represented by Yvette Cooper of the Labour Party for the whole of its creation. (Note: As with all constituencies, the constituency elects one Member of Parliament (MP) by the first past the post system of election at least every five years.) Cooper served under the governments of Tony Blair and Gordon Brown alongside her husband Ed Balls, and served as Shadow Home Secretary under the leadership of Ed Miliband.

Further to the completion of the 2023 Periodic Review of Westminster constituencies, the seat was subjected to boundary changes, including the loss of Normanton, and reformed as Pontefract, Castleford and Knottingley, to be first contested at the 2024 general election.

== History ==
Parliament accepted the Boundary Commission's Fifth Periodic Review of Westminster constituencies which recommended this constituency for the 2010 general election in the district of the city of Wakefield. Due to less increase in population than elsewhere the commission had to reduce constituencies in the county by one, resulting in the "merger" of Normanton and Pontefract/Castleford seats, however some wards of both went to other neighbouring seats to give the correct size electorate.

The commission had great difficulty in naming the constituency, with "Normanton and Pontefract" and "Pontefract and Castleford" both suggested. On 24 May 2006 the modified name was chosen following further public consultation. The only other three-place constituency name in England was Ruislip, Northwood and Pinner in London.

== Boundaries ==
Map of 2010–2024 boundaries

The constituency first contested at the 2010 general election has electoral wards of the City of Wakefield:

- Airedale and Ferry Fryston, Altofts and Whitwood, Castleford Central and Glasshoughton, Knottingley, Normanton, Pontefract North, and Pontefract South.

== Constituency profile ==
The area has the three retail towns, Pontefract being the most touristic — producing liquorice as well as Pontefract cakes — the wider economy includes self-employed trades, work in local manufacturing and jobs in creative industry, retail, public sector and corporate headquarters including in Leeds and Wakefield.

The last working deep coal mine in the United Kingdom, Kellingley Colliery, was a significant employer until it closed in December 2015.

Well recovered from economic decline from the loss of most local mines, the rate of jobseeking benefits claimed is lower than the Yorkshire and Humber average (4.6%) at 4.4% however this slightly exceeds the national average and is over twice that of six constituencies in the region. (Note: York Outer, Elmet and Rothwell, Sheffield Hallam, Harrogate and Knaresborough, Skipton and Ripon and, Thirsk and Malton)

== Members of Parliament ==
Election	Member	Party
2010	Yvette Cooper	Labour
2024	Constituency abolished	

== Election results 2010–2024 ==
=== Elections in the 2010s ===
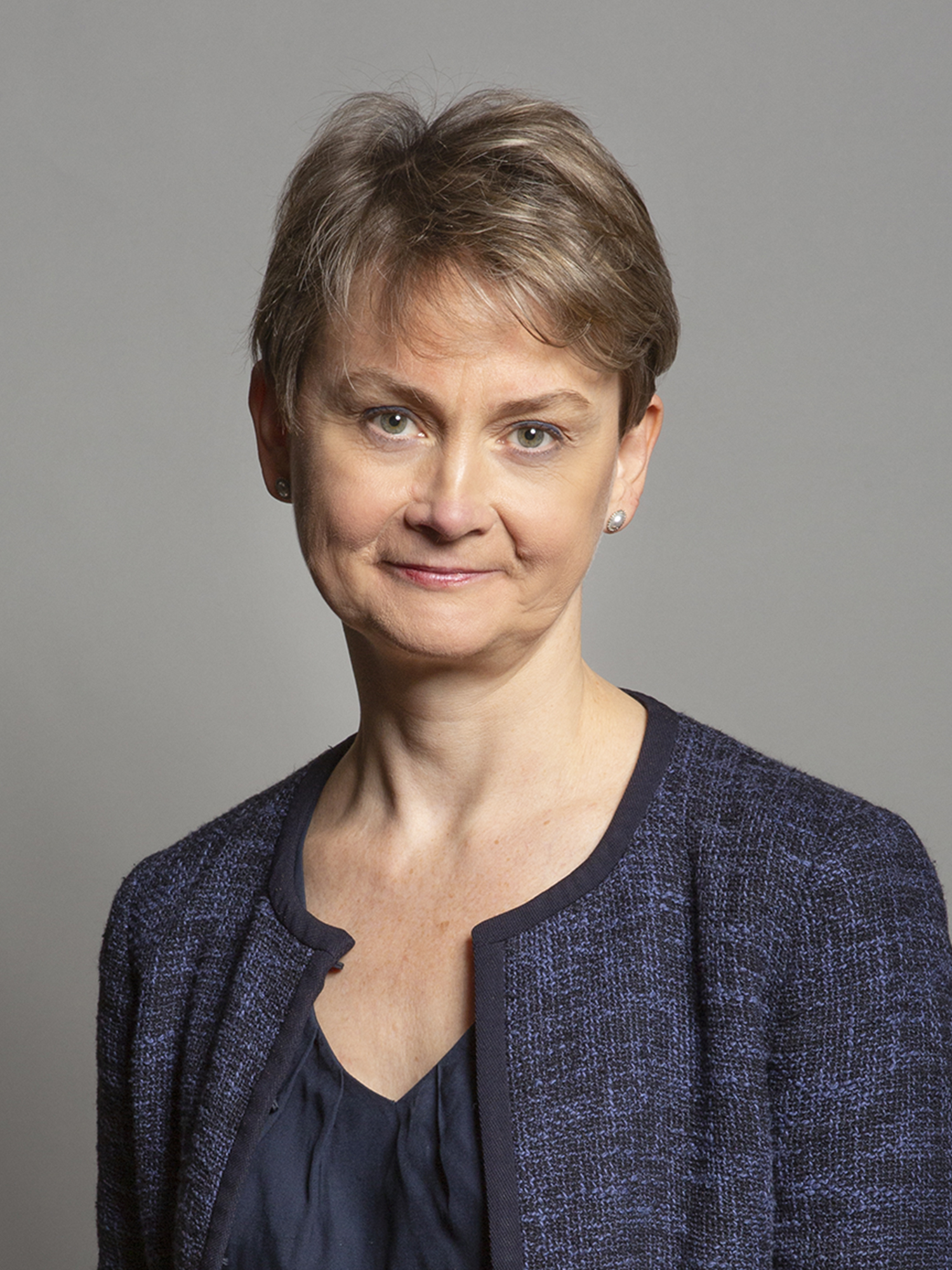
Yvette Cooper

General election 2010: Normanton, Pontefract and Castleford
Party	Candidate	Votes	%	±%
Labour	Yvette Cooper	22,293	48.1	
Conservative	Nick Pickles	11,314	24.4	
Liberal Democrats	Chris Rush	7,585	16.4	
BNP	Graham Thewlis-Hardy	3,846	8.3	
Independent	Gareth Allen	1,183	2.6	
Majority		10,979	23.7	
Turnout		46,221	56.1	
Labour win (new seat)				

General election 2015: Normanton, Pontefract and Castleford
Party	Candidate	Votes	%	±%
Labour	Yvette Cooper	25,213	54.9	+6.8
UKIP	Nathan Garbutt	9,785	21.3	New
Conservative	Beth Prescott	9,569	20.8	−3.6
Liberal Democrats	Edward McMillan-Scott	1,330	2.9	−13.5
Majority		15,428	33.6	+9.9
Turnout		45,897	55.6	–0.6
Labour hold		Swing		

General election 2017: Normanton, Pontefract and Castleford
Party	Candidate	Votes	%	±%
Labour	Yvette Cooper	29,268	59.5	+4.6
Conservative	Andrew Lee	14,769	30.0	+9.2
UKIP	Lewis Thompson	3,030	6.2	−15.1
Yorkshire	Daniel Gascoigne	1,431	2.9	New
Liberal Democrats	Clarke Roberts	693	1.4	−1.5
Majority		14,499	29.5	−4.1
Turnout		49,191	60.3	+4.7
Labour hold		Swing		

General election 2019: Normanton, Pontefract and Castleford
Party	Candidate	Votes	%	±%
Labour	Yvette Cooper	18,297	37.9	−21.6
Conservative	Andrew Lee	17,021	35.3	+5.3
Brexit Party	Deneice Florence-Jukes	8,032	16.6	New
Liberal Democrats	Tom Gordon	3,147	6.5	+5.1
Yorkshire	Laura Walker	1,762	3.7	+0.8
Majority		1,276	2.6	−26.9
Turnout		48,419	57.3	−3.0
Labour hold		Swing	−13.4	

== 2016 United Kingdom European Union membership referendum ==
The results for the referendum were not returned by individual parliamentary constituencies (instead using a counting area within a region), but the Normanton, Pontefract and Castleford area is estimated to have voted by a 69.3% – 30.7% margin to leave the European Union.

== See also ==
- List of parliamentary constituencies in West Yorkshire
