= Bishop Dike =

Watercourse in North Yorkshire, England

Bishop Dike Bishop's Dike Bishop's Dyke
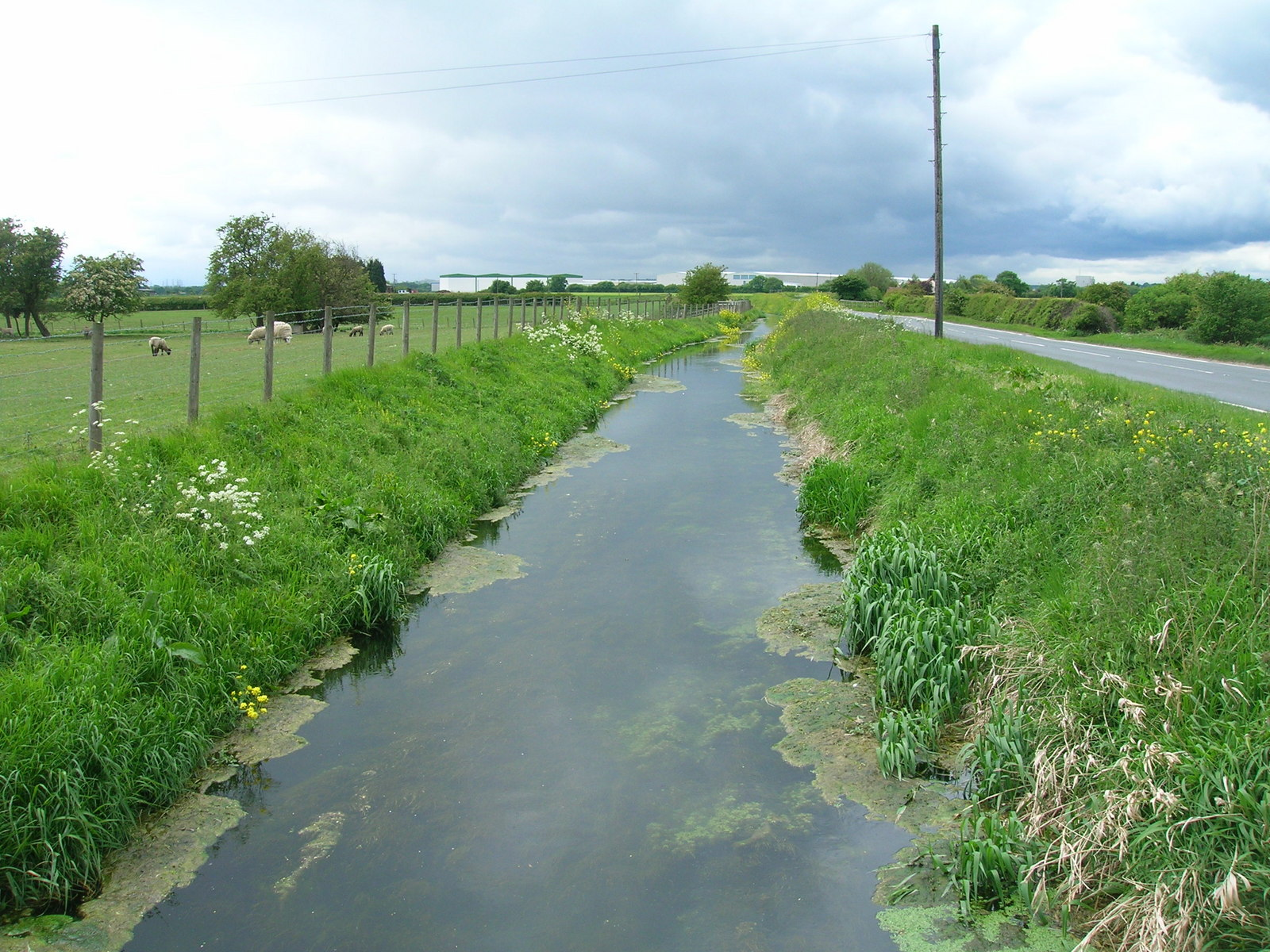
- Bishop Dike looking west towards Sherburn-in-Elmet

- Location within North Yorkshire

Location
- County: North Yorkshire
- Country: England

Physical characteristics
- Source
  - location: Barkston Ash
  - coordinates: 53.820°N 1.252°W
  - elevation: 10 metres (33 ft)
- Mouth
  - location: Cawood
  - coordinates: 53.833°N 1.128°W
  - elevation: 5 metres (16 ft)
- Length: 17 kilometres (11 mi)
- Basin size: 25.6 square kilometres (9.9 sq mi)

Basin features
- Progression: River Ouse, Humber Estuary
- EA waterbody ID: GB104027063660

Bishop Dike is an artificial watercourse in North Yorkshire, England. The dike, which runs from near Barkston Ash to Cawood, was built in the 15th century to carry stone from Huddleston Quarry to York upstream via the River Ouse to enable building works to be undertaken on York Minster. The dike is now used as a drainage channel. Some believe that the watercourse existed in a smaller form as a natural drainage channel, and that it was later canalised.

== History ==
During the 15th century, stone from the quarries at Thevesdale and Huddleston was used in the building of York Minster. To transport the stone, the Bishop Dike was constructed which went eastwards from the quarry site past Sherburn in Elmet, Biggin, and onwards to Cawood, where the stone could be transported upstream on the River Ouse into York. In his book The old kingdom of Elmet, Edmund Bogg states that the dyke existed before its use as a canal, and that the religious authorities had the watercourse widened and straightened. John Leland set out on a journey in 1540 westwards from Cawood to Sherburn-in-Elmet which he described as "...wel woodid and almost stil riding by a riveret caullid Bishops' water [sic].." Although the watercourse was leased for 80 years by the dean and chapter of York Minster, it seems that stone may have also been transported by cart to Cawood. Some have theorised that besides stone, the dike transported timber from the Bishops' woods in the area, or that the dike was built to either drain water away from the quarries, or to carry fresh water to Cawood. Other buildings in England which used stone sourced at Thevesdale or Huddleston and transported along Bishop Dike in their construction include King's College Cambridge, Eton College, and Westminster Abbey. Stone from Huddleston was used for York Minster up until the 16th century. Miller and Gee provide evidence in historical documents to show that stone at Cawood was moved around in the river and wharf area, suggesting that it had arrived by, and was due to leave, by boat. If carts were used, it would not have been necessary to move the stone around the quayside area.

The dike still exists, and forms a drainage channel that flows into the River Ouse at Cawood, being part of the Ouse Catchment. After use as a means of transport, several corn mills were built along the dike in the Sherburn in Elmet area. The dike meanders slightly around Sherburn, but between Sherburn and Cawood it is straight until it reaches Cawood where it changes its heading markedly by 20 degrees to the north-east. In its final reaches, the dike provided a boundary for Cawood Castle at is north-western edge, and connected with a canal system around the original archbishop's residence (Cawood Castle), and in the 19th century, the dike in this area was culverted and deepened. Along the southern edge of Cawood Castle grounds is a ditch, some 20 metres (66 ft) wide and 2 metres (6 ft 7 in) deep, called the New Cut. Whilst this ditch is separate from Bishop Dike, it is thought to have once been part of a medieval dockside connected to Bishop Dike.

The greatest sources for the watercourse are several springs and a lake in the Barkston Ash area, and the dike extends for 17 kilometres (11 mi) between Barkston Ash and its mouth at Cawood, draining an area of 25.6 square kilometres (9.9 sq mi). The Environment Agency consider the watercourse to have a poor ecological status. Miller and Gee describe the dike as being quite uniform in its construction and having a width of around 16 feet (4.9 m), with an average depth of 3 feet (0.91 m) (Note: This measurement was taken in May 1980 at the end of a dry season, so the actual depth may not be reflective of normal values.) which slopes to 1 foot 6 inches (0.46 m) at the sides.

== Flooding ==
Flooding on the watercourse is alleviated by two overflow sections just east of Sherburn in Elmet which are known locally as The Bathtubs. These allow water to flow into two dikes running south through the Selby Dam catchment. A project was undertaken between 2020 and 2023 to reduce the agricultural run-off in the upper reaches of the dike, which was promoting weed growth in the lower section and causing flooding.
