= Thorpe Audlin =

Hamlet in West Yorkshire, England

Coordinates: 53.639°N 1.283°W

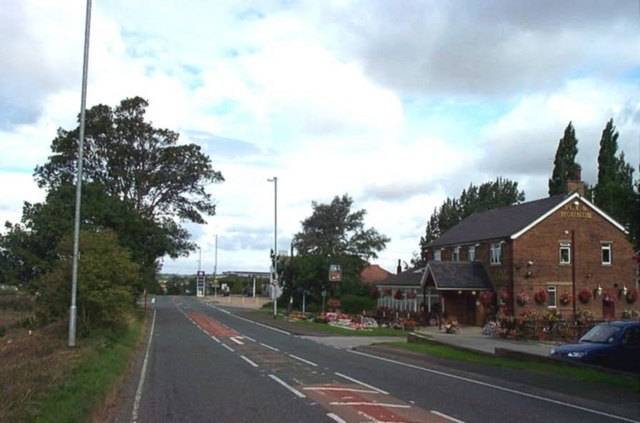
- Crossroads at Thorpe Audlin

- Location within West Yorkshire
- Population: 660 (2011)
- OS grid reference: SE475161
  - London: 155 mi (249 km) SSE
- Metropolitan borough: City of Wakefield
- Metropolitan county: West Yorkshire
- Region: Yorkshire and the Humber
- Country: England
- Sovereign state: United Kingdom
- Post town: PONTEFRACT
- Postcode district: WF8
- Dialling code: 01977
- Police: West Yorkshire
- Fire: West Yorkshire
- Ambulance: Yorkshire
- UK Parliament: Hemsworth

Thorpe Audlin is a hamlet and civil parish in the City of Wakefield in West Yorkshire, England. The population of the civil parish at the 2011 census was 660. Until 1974 it was part of Hemsworth Rural District. Thorpe Audlin is situated approximately 5 miles (8 km) from Pontefract.

== History ==
Evidence of human activity in the Thorpe Audlin local area dates back to the very early ages in the local village of Badsworth. There is however, distinct evidence of Roman settlers in Thorpe Audlin itself. Evidence includes the discovery of Roman coins, as well as the road linking Doncaster and Pontefract being of Roman origin.

The name Thorpe derives from the Old Norse þorp meaning 'secondary settlement'. The suffix Audlin derives from a man named Audelin, whose son William was a tenant here in 1190.

Thorpe Audlin is included in the 1086 Domesday Book, under the Hundred of Osgoodcross. The survey recorded 14 households, between eight villagers and four smallholders. Thorpe Audlin was considered to be a medium-sized settlement at the time. The Lord in 1066 was Alsi son of Karski. The Lord after Domesday was Ralph, while the tenant-in-chief was Ilbert of Lacy. The total taxable amount was 6.4 Geld units, being a relatively large amount compared to other settlements.

In the 1870s Thorpe Audlin was described as: "THORP-AUDLIN, a township in Badsworth parish, W. R. Yorkshire; 4¼ miles SSE of Pontefract. Acres, 1,260. Real property, £2,237. Pop., 304. Houses, 65."

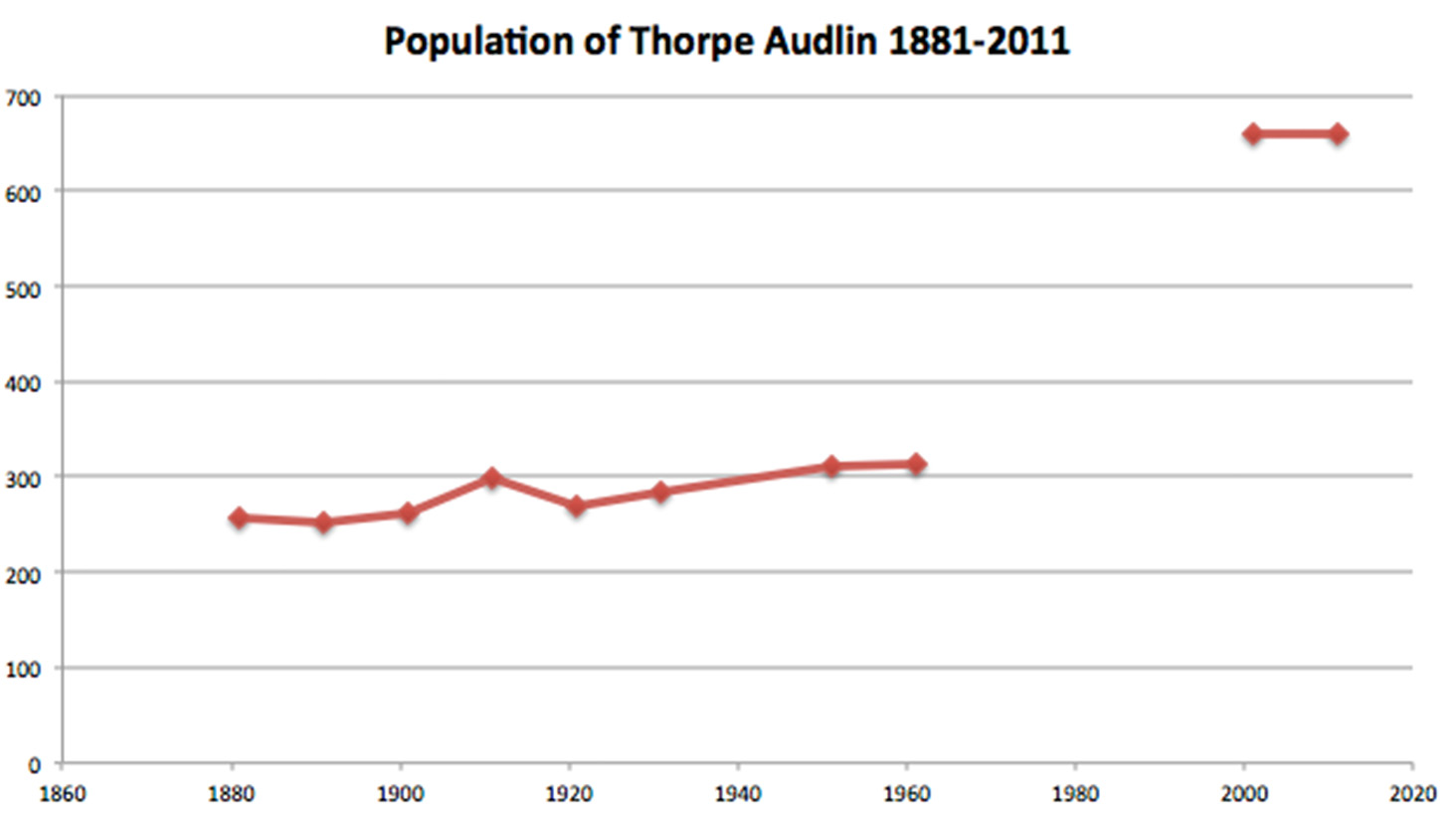
(excluding data between 1961–1981)

== Population ==
The population of Thorpe Audlin was in a state of gradual decline until the early part of the 20th century where it sank to 245 in 1911, declining from 355 in the early part of the 19th century. The population of Thorpe Audlin fluctuated fairly mildly until the 1960s. The population more than doubled between the 1960s and 2000 rising to over 600 people. Thorpe Audlin currently has a population of 660.

== Cricket Club ==
The Thorpe Audlin Cricket Club is based on Bridge Lane. It fields a number of teams of different age groups, including junior teams from the Under 9 age group to the Under 19 team The two Senior teams play in the Pontefract & District Cricket League, with the 1st XI and 2nd XI playing in the 5th Division and 8th Division respectively.

In 2012 the club won the 1st XI won the Heyward Williams Cup. The Junior teams also reached two cup finals. The Village Sports Field is administered by the Sports Field Trust. The Trustees are the current members of the Parish Council.

== Community Association ==
Residents of Thorpe Audlin automatically qualify for membership of the Community Association. The association leases The Ramsden Hall on Darning Lane from the church at the cost of £1000 a year.

== Parish council ==
The parish council consists of five members, including a chairman, vice-chairman and clerk to the council.

== See also ==
- Listed buildings in Thorpe Audlin
