= Ackworth, North Elmsall and Upton =

Ward of City of Wakefield, West Yorkshire, England

Coordinates: 53.63315598818736°N 1.3106347892390762°W

- Location within West Yorkshire
- Metropolitan borough: City of Wakefield
- Metropolitan county: West Yorkshire
- Region: Yorkshire and the Humber
- Country: England
- Sovereign state: United Kingdom
- Police: West Yorkshire
- Fire: West Yorkshire
- Ambulance: Yorkshire
- UK Parliament: Hemsworth

Ackworth, North Elmsall and Upton is an electoral ward of the City of Wakefield district used for elections to Wakefield Metropolitan District Council.

== Overview ==
The ward is situated in the south east of the Wakefield district and is made up of a number of villages and hamlets set amongst farmland. The villages in the ward include Ackworth, North Elmsall and Upton, Badsworth, Thorpe Audlin, Low Ackworth and High Ackworth and part of Wentbridge. Landmarks include Nostell Priory.

== Councillors ==
Election	Councillor	Councillor	Councillor
2004	Allan Garbutt (Lab)	Alan Bell (Lab)	Linda Broom (Lab)
2006	Allan Garbutt (Lab)	Sarah Balfour (Lab)	Linda Broom (Lab)
2007	Allan Garbutt (Lab)	Sarah Balfour (Lab)	Jean Martin (Lab)
2008	Richard Molloy (Con)	Sarah Balfour (Lab)	Jean Martin (Lab)
2010	Richard Molloy (Con)	Allan Garbutt (Lab)	Jean Martin (Lab)
2011	Richard Molloy (Con)	Allan Garbutt (Lab)	Jean Askew (Lab)
2012	Martyn Ward (Lab)	Allan Garbutt (Lab)	Jean Askew (Lab)
2014	Martyn Ward (Lab)	Allan Garbutt (Lab)	Jean Askew (Lab)
2015	Martyn Ward (Lab)	Allan Garbutt (Lab)	Sarah Carrington (Lab)
2016	Martyn Ward (Lab)	Allan Garbutt (Lab)	Sarah Carrington (Lab)
2018	Martyn Ward (Lab)	Allan Garbutt (Lab)	Sarah Carrington (Lab)
2019	Martyn Ward (Lab)	Allan Garbutt (Lab)	Sarah Carrington (Lab)
2021	Raymond Massey (Con)	Allan Garbutt (Lab)	Sarah Carrington (Lab)
2022	Raymond Massey (Con)	Allan Garbutt (Lab)	Sarah Carrington (Lab)
2023	Raymond Massey (Con)	Allan Garbutt (Lab)	Sarah Carrington (Lab)
2024	Martin Roberts (Lab)	Allan Garbutt (Lab)	Sarah Carrington (Lab)

== Election results ==
2024 Wakefield Metropolitan District Council election
Party	Candidate	Votes	%	±%
Labour	Martin Roberts	1,719	57.4	+10.9
Green	Jody Gabriel	663	22.2	+12.4
Conservative	Dylan Nykamp	611	20.4	+2.7
Majority		1,056	35.2	+6.1
Turnout		2,993	22.4	–1.5
Labour gain from Conservative		Swing	▼0.8	

2023 Wakefield Metropolitan District Council election
Party	Candidate	Votes	%	±%
Labour	Jessica Carrington*	1,516	47.5	+12.7
Conservative	Chad Jordan Thomas	579	18.1	−0.2
Independent	Gwen Marshall	550	17.2	+9.3
Reform	Arthur Jerome Miles	293	8.8	New
Green	Jody Paul Gabriel	267	8.4	New
Majority		937	29.4	+12.1
Turnout		3,221	23.9	−3.4
Rejected ballots		28		
Labour hold		Swing		

2022 Wakefield Metropolitan District Council election
Party	Candidate	Votes	%	±%
Labour	Allan Garbutt*	1537	44.8	+9.6
Conservative	David Pointon	916	26.7	−9.9
Independent	Gwen Marshall	568	16.6	+13
Green	Jody Gabriel	288	8.4	+1.7
Freedom Alliance	Carol Higgins	121	3.5	N/A
Majority		621	18.1	+16.2
Turnout		3430	25.6	−4.7
Labour hold		Swing		

2021 Wakefield Metropolitan District Council election
Party	Candidate	Votes	%	±%
Conservative	Raymond Massey	1483	36.6	+18.3
Labour	Stan Bates	1427	35.2	+0.4
Yorkshire	Chris Dawson	447	11.0	−8.0
Liberal Democrats	Christopher Howden	281	6.9	−1.6
Green	Jody Gabriel	271	6.7	+6.7
Independent	Gwen Marshall	144	3.6	−4.2
Majority		56	1.4	−15.9
Turnout		4053	30.3	+3.0
Conservative gain from Labour		Swing	{{{swing}}}	

2019 Wakefield Metropolitan District Council election
Party	Candidate	Votes	%	±%
Labour	Jessica Carrington	1224	34.8	−7.5
Yorkshire	Martin Roberts	670	19.0	+10.2
Conservative	Philip Davies	642	18.3	−6.7
Independent	John Hardman	412	11.7	+11.7
Liberal Democrats	Nick Gray	293	8.3	+4.7
Independent	Gwen Marshall	276	7.8	−6.3
Majority		554	17.3	−1.5
Turnout		3520	27.3	+2.0
Rejected ballots		118		
Labour hold		Swing		

2018 Wakefield Metropolitan District Council election
Party	Candidate	Votes	%	±%
Labour	Allan Garbutt	1383	42.3	−3.4
Conservative	Philip Davies	817	25	+4.5
Independent	Gwen Marshall	461	14.1	N/A
Yorkshire	Martin Roberts	286	8.8	+2.6
Green	George Scogings	202	6.2	N/A
Liberal Democrats	Mary MacQueen	119	3.6	N/A
Majority		566	17.3	−5.3
Turnout		3268	25.3	−5.3
Rejected ballots		5		
Labour hold		Swing		

2016 Wakefield Metropolitan District Council election
Party	Candidate	Votes	%	±%
Labour	Martyn Ward	1631	45.7	0.0
Conservative	Don Marshall	776	20.5	−7.7
UKIP	Nathan Garbutt	639	16.9	−4.1
Independent	Steven Pallett	500	13.2	N/A
Yorkshire First	Martin Roberts	234	6.2	−0.4%
Majority		855	22.6	+4.6
Turnout		3780	30.6	−27.9
Labour hold		Swing		

2015 Wakefield Metropolitan District Council election
Party	Candidate	Votes	%	±%
Labour	Jessica Carrington	3437	45.7	+2.5
Conservative	Don Marshall	2081	27.7	+5.5
UKIP	Mick Tetlow	1507	20.0	−14.6
Yorkshire First	Martin Roberts	493	6.6	N/A
Majority		1356	18.0	+9.4
Turnout		7518	58.5	+28.3
Labour hold		Swing		

2014 Wakefield Metropolitan District Council election
Party	Candidate	Votes	%	±%
Labour	Allan Garbutt	1636	43.2	−18.8
UKIP	Anne Arundel	1312	34.6	N/A
Conservative	Don Marshall	841	22.2	−15.4
Majority		324	8.6	−16.2
Turnout		3789	30.2	+3.3
Labour hold		Swing		

2012 Wakefield Metropolitan District Council election
Party	Candidate	Votes	%	±%
Labour	Martyn Ward	2,128	62.4	+10.2
Conservative	Don Marshall	1,282	37.6	+3
Majority		846	24.8	+7.1
Turnout		3,410	26.9	−10.6
Labour gain from Conservative		Swing		

2011 Wakefield Metropolitan District Council election
Party	Candidate	Votes	%	±%
Labour	Jean Askew	2,484	52.2	+14.6
Conservative	Don Marshall	1,643	34.6	+4.7
BNP	Ian Kitchen	318	6.7	−2.4
Liberal Democrats	David Arthur	285	6.0	−7
Majority		841	17.7	+10.6
Turnout		4,755	37.5	−25.5
Labour hold		Swing		

2010 Wakefield Metropolitan District Council election
Party	Candidate	Votes	%	±%
Labour	Allan Garbutt	3,001	37.6	−0.7
Conservative	Don Marshall	2,434	30.5	−12.7
Liberal Democrats	Brendan Power	1,034	13.0	−5.5
Independent	John Evans	745	9.3	+9.3
BNP	Ian Kitchen	722	9.1	+9.1
Majority		567	7.1	+12
Turnout		7,973	63	
Labour hold		Swing	+6%	

2008 Wakefield Metropolitan District Council election
Party	Candidate	Votes	%	±%
Conservative	Richard Molloy	1,653	43.2	+13.5
Labour	Allan Garbutt	1,466	38.3	+1.1
Liberal Democrats	David Arthur	709	18.5	+4.1
Majority		187	4.9	
Turnout		3,828		
Conservative gain from Labour		Swing		

2007 Wakefield Metropolitan District Council election
Party	Candidate	Votes	%	±%
Labour	Jean Martin	1,407	37.2	−4.4
Conservative	Richard Molloy	1,124	29.7	−1.6
Independent	John Evans	708	18.7	+4.9
Liberal Democrats	Oliver Wadsworth	544	14.4	+1.2
Majority		283	7.5	−2.8
Turnout		3,783		
Labour hold		Swing		

2006 Wakefield Metropolitan District Council election
Party	Candidate	Votes	%	±%
Labour	Sarah Balfour	1,707	41.6	
Conservative	Andrew Crowther	1,285	31.3	
Independent	John Evans	566	13.8	
Liberal Democrats	Oliver Wadsworth	543	13.2	
Majority		422	10.3	
Turnout		4,101		
Labour hold		Swing		

2004 Wakefield Metropolitan District Council election
Party	Candidate	Votes	%	±%
Labour	Allan Garbutt	1,951		
Labour	Alan Bell	1,526		
Labour	Linda Broom	1,362		
Liberal Democrats	James McDougall	1,259		
Conservative	Keith Wilson	1,241		
Conservative	Katie Denson	1,060		
Conservative	Sheila Scholes	1,021		
Independent	John Evans	974		
Liberal Democrats	Kenneth Ridgway	784		
Liberal Democrats	Margaret Dodd	725		
Turnout		11,903	38.6	
