= Altofts and Whitwood =

Ward of City of Wakefield, West Yorkshire, England

Coordinates: 53.697°N 1.416°W

- Location within West Yorkshire
- Metropolitan borough: City of Wakefield
- Metropolitan county: West Yorkshire
- Region: Yorkshire and the Humber
- Country: England
- Sovereign state: United Kingdom
- Police: West Yorkshire
- Fire: West Yorkshire
- Ambulance: Yorkshire
- UK Parliament: Pontefract, Castleford and Knottingley

Altofts and Whitwood is an electoral ward of the City of Wakefield district used for elections to Wakefield Metropolitan District Council.

== Overview ==
The ward is one of 21 in the Wakefield district, and has been held by Labour since the current boundaries were formed for the 2004 Council election. As of 2015, the electorate stands at 12,495 of which 96.1% identify as "White British" and 67.5% of who identify as Christian.

The ward comprises Altofts, Whitwood and Whitwood Mere, and a number of industrial parks that occupy much of the land between Normanton and Castleford. The ward also includes the Cutsyke, Roundhill and Half Acres areas of Castleford. To the north the ward is bounded by the River Calder. The ward is bisected by the M62 and has the Trans Pennine Trail running through it.

== Representation ==
Like all wards in the Wakefield district, Altofts and Whitwood has 3 councillors, whom are elected on a 4-year-rota. This means elections for new councillors are held for three years running, with one year every four years having no elections.

The current councillors are Jo Hepworth and Jacquie Speight both of whom are Labour. There are only currently two councillors due to the resignation of Peter Box CBE who served as Leader of Wakefield Council for 21 years.

== Councillors ==
Election	Councillor	Councillor	Councillor
2004	Peter Box CBE (Lab)	Heather Hudson (Lab)	Darran Travis (Lab)
2006	Peter Box CBE (Lab)	Heather Hudson (Lab)	Darran Travis (Lab)
2007	Peter Box CBE (Lab)	Heather Hudson (Lab)	Darran Travis (Lab)
2008	Peter Box CBE (Lab)	Heather Hudson (Lab)	Darran Travis (Lab)
2010	Peter Box CBE (Lab)	Heather Hudson (Lab)	Darran Travis (Lab)
2011	Peter Box CBE (Lab)	Heather Hudson (Lab)	Darran Travis (Lab)
2012	Peter Box CBE (Lab)	Heather Hudson (Lab)	Darran Travis (Lab)
2014	Peter Box CBE (Lab)	Heather Hudson (Lab)	Jacquie Speight (Lab)
2015	Peter Box CBE (Lab)	Jo Hepworth (Lab)	Jacquie Speight (Lab)
2016	Peter Box CBE (Lab)	Jo Hepworth (Lab)	Jacquie Speight (Lab)
2018	Peter Box CBE (Lab)	Jo Hepworth (Lab)	Jacquie Speight (Lab)
2019	Peter Box CBE (Lab)	Jo Hepworth (Lab)	Jacquie Speight (Lab)
2021	Josie Farrar (Lab)	Jo Hepworth (Lab)	Jacquie Speight (Lab)
2022	Josie Farrar (Lab)	Jo Hepworth (Lab)	Jacquie Speight (Lab)
2023	Josie Farrar (Lab)	Jo Hepworth (Lab)	Jacquie Speight (Lab)

== Election results ==
2023 Wakefield Metropolitan District Council election
Party	Candidate	Votes	%	±%
Labour	Jo Hepworth*	1,748	52.8	+13.4
Wakefield District Independents	John Thomas	804	24.3	+17.8
Conservative	Amy Louise Swift	518	15.7	−1.1
Green	Katherine Clare Dodd	238	7.2	New
Majority		944	28.5	+21.6
Turnout		3,308	23.0	−1.8
Rejected ballots		11		
Labour hold		Swing		

2022 Wakefield Metropolitan District Council election
Party	Candidate	Votes	%	±%
Labour	Jacquie Speight*	2,053	56.49	+9.0
Conservative	Barbara Wright	809	22.26	−15.8
Independent	John Thomas	613	16.87	+11.7
Liberal Democrats	Leanne Hall	159	4.38	N/A
Majority		1,244	34.23	
Turnout		3,634		
Labour hold		Swing		

2021 Wakefield Metropolitan District Council election
Party	Candidate	Votes	%	±%
Labour	Josie Farrar	1,896	47.5	+8.1
Conservative	Anthony David Hill	1,522	38.1	+21.3
Green	Brenden Beckett	283	7.1	+7.1
Reform UK	John Thomas	209	5.2	+5.2
Workers Party	Zane Carpenter	80	2.0	+2.0
Majority		374	9.4	+2.5
Turnout		3,990	28.1	+3.3
Labour hold		Swing	-6.6	

2019 Wakefield Metropolitan District Council election
Party	Candidate	Votes	%	±%
Labour	Jo Hepworth	1318	39.4	−18.1
Yorkshire	Laura Walker (Note: Walker stood as the Yorkshire Party candidate in the 2019 general election for Normanton, Pontefract and Castleford.)	1089	32.5	+22.4
Conservative	Anthony Hill	562	16.8	−11.2
Democrats and Veterans	John Thomas	219	6.5	+2.1
Liberal Democrats	Malcolm Pollack	159	4.8	+4.8
Majority		229	6.9	−22.6
Turnout		3347	24.8	+0.9
Rejected ballots		35		
Labour hold		Swing		

2018 Wakefield Metropolitan District Council election
Party	Candidate	Votes	%	±%
Labour	Jacquie Speight	1823	57.5	−1
Conservative	Anthony Hill	888	28	+8.4
Yorkshire	Steven Crookes	320	10.1	−0.5
Democrats and Veterans	John Thomas	140	4.4	N/A
Majority		935	29.5	−9.4
Turnout		3171	23.9	−3.5
Rejected ballots		9		
Labour hold		Swing		

2016 Wakefield Metropolitan District Council election
Party	Candidate	Votes	%	±%
Labour	Peter Box	1994	58.5	+3.5
Conservative	Anthony Hill	668	19.6	−2.4
Independent	Matthew Jeans	384	11.3	N/A
Yorkshire First	Steve Crookes	363	10.6	N/A
Majority		1326	38.9	+6.4
Turnout		3409	27.4	−30.0
Labour hold		Swing		

2015 Wakefield Metropolitan District Council election
Party	Candidate	Votes	%	±%
Labour	Jo Hepworth	4168	55.3	+5.9
UKIP	Geoffrey Johnston	1715	22.8	−13.8
Conservative	Anthony Hill	1655	22.0	+7.9
Majority		2453	32.5	+19.7
Turnout		7538	57.4	+29.7
Labour hold		Swing		

2014 Wakefield Metropolitan District Council election
Party	Candidate	Votes	%	±%
Labour	Jacquie Speight	1735	49.4	−12.2
UKIP	Tracie Corbett	1285	36.6	+12.6
Conservative	Anthony Hill	494	14.1	−0.3
Majority		450	12.8	−24.8
Turnout		3514	27.7	+1.9
Labour hold		Swing		

2012 Wakefield Metropolitan District Council election
Party	Candidate	Votes	%	±%
Labour	Peter Box	2,009	61.6	−2.5
UKIP	David Armitage	783	24	+24
Conservative	Steven Beeton	470	14.4	−10.7
Majority		1,226	37.6	−1.5
Turnout		3,262	25.8	−6.4
Labour hold		Swing		

2011 Wakefield Metropolitan District Council election
Party	Candidate	Votes	%	±%
Labour	Heather Hudson	2,582	64.1	+17.9
Conservative	Steven Beeton	1,009	25.1	+3.8
Liberal Democrats	Michael Burch	404	10.0	−10.9
Majority		1,573	39.1	+14.2
Turnout		4,027	32.2	−27.5
Labour hold		Swing		

2010 Wakefield Metropolitan District Council election
Party	Candidate	Votes	%	±%
Labour	Darran Travis	3,385	46.2	+8.8
Conservative	David Rudge	1,561	21.3	−1.2
Liberal Democrats	Michael Burch	1533	20.9	−2.6
BNP	Adam Frazer	818	11.2	−5.4
Majority		1,824	24.9	+11
Turnout		7,327	59.7	
Labour hold		Swing		

2008 Wakefield Metropolitan District Council election
Party	Candidate	Votes	%	±%
Labour	Peter Box	1,316	37.4	−10.8
Liberal Democrats	Michael Burch	827	23.5	+4.4
Conservative	Gordon Tennant	793	22.5	+6.7
BNP	Dawn Byrom	585	16.6	−0.2
Majority		489	13.9	−15.2
Turnout		3,521		
Labour hold		Swing		

2007 Wakefield Metropolitan District Council election
Party	Candidate	Votes	%	±%
Labour	Heather Hudson	1,563	48.2	1.4
Liberal Democrats	Michael Burch	619	19.1	+2.6
BNP	Dawn Byrom	546	16.8	−2.9
Conservative	Tom Dixon	513	15.8	+1.6
Majority		944	29.1	−0.8
Turnout		3,241		
Labour hold		Swing		

2006 Wakefield Metropolitan District Council election
Party	Candidate	Votes	%	±%
Labour	Darran Travis	1,717	49.6	
BNP	Loraine Frazer	682	19.7	
Liberal Democrats	Michael Burch	572	16.5	
Conservative	Tom Dixon	490	14.2	
Majority		1,035	29.9	
Turnout		3,461		
Labour hold		Swing		

2004 Wakefield Metropolitan District Council election
Party	Candidate	Votes	%	±%
Labour	Peter Box	1,993		
Labour	Heather Hudson	1,939		
Labour	Darran Travis	1,855		
Liberal Democrats	Michael Burch	876		
BNP	William Draper	701		
Liberal Democrats	Simon Curtis	700		
Conservative	Allen Glendinning	625		
Conservative	Tom Dixon	584		
Liberal Democrats	Carey Chambers	566		
Conservative	Jean Molloy	559		
Turnout		10,398	38.0	
