= Castleford Central and Glasshoughton =

Electoral ward in England

Coordinates: 53.716264°N 1.346271°W

- Location within West Yorkshire
- Metropolitan borough: City of Wakefield
- Metropolitan county: West Yorkshire
- Region: Yorkshire and the Humber
- Country: England
- Sovereign state: United Kingdom
- Police: West Yorkshire
- Fire: West Yorkshire
- Ambulance: Yorkshire
- UK Parliament: Pontefract, Castleford and Knottingley

Castleford Central and Glasshoughton is an electoral ward of the City of Wakefield district used for elections to Wakefield Metropolitan District Council.

== Overview ==
The ward is one of 21 in the Wakefield district, and has been held by Labour since the current boundaries were formed for the 2004 Council election. As of 2019, the electorate stands at 12,093 of which, according to the 2011 Census, 95.7% identify as "White British" and 66.5% of who identify as Christian.

The ward is situated in the north of the District and incorporates central Castleford, Wheldon Road and Lock Lane, Glasshoughton, Redhill (part), Smawthorne Estate, The Maltkilns, the Potteries and the Healdfield area. The south of the ward is bounded by the M62 motorway, and the boundary to the north of the ward is defined by the River Aire and River Calder.

== Representation ==
Like all wards in the Wakefield district, Castleford Central and Glashoughton has 3 councillors, whom are elected on a 4-year-rota. This means elections for new councillors are held for three years running, with one year every four years having no elections.

The current councillors are Richard Forster, Tony Wallis and Denise Jeffery, all of whom are Labour.

Jeffery is currently the Leader of Wakefield Council, after her predecessor Peter Box CBE stood down after 21 years in the position.

Notable former councillors for this ward include former West Yorkshire Police and Crime Commissioner Mark Burns-Williamson.

== Councillors ==
Election	Councillor	Councillor	Councillor
2004	Mark Burns-Williamson (Lab)	Tony Wallis (Lab)	Denise Jeffery (Lab)
2006	Mark Burns-Williamson (Lab)	Tony Wallis (Lab)	Denise Jeffery (Lab)
2007	Mark Burns-Williamson (Lab)	Tony Wallis (Lab)	Denise Jeffery (Lab)
2008	Mark Burns-Williamson (Lab)	Tony Wallis (Lab)	Denise Jeffery (Lab)
2010	Mark Burns-Williamson (Lab)	Tony Wallis (Lab)	Denise Jeffery (Lab)
2011	Mark Burns-Williamson (Lab)	Tony Wallis (Lab)	Denise Jeffery (Lab)
2012	Mark Burns-Williamson (Lab)	Tony Wallis (Lab)	Denise Jeffery (Lab)
2013 By-Election	Richard Forster (Lab)	Tony Wallis (Lab)	Denise Jeffery (Lab)
2014	Richard Forster (Lab)	Tony Wallis (Lab)	Denise Jeffery (Lab)
2015	Richard Forster (Lab)	Tony Wallis (Lab)	Denise Jeffery (Lab)
2016	Richard Forster (Lab)	Tony Wallis (Lab)	Denise Jeffery (Lab)
2018	Richard Forster (Lab)	Tony Wallis (Lab)	Denise Jeffery (Lab)
2019	Richard Forster (Lab)	Tony Wallis (Lab)	Denise Jeffery (Lab)
2021	Richard Forster (Lab)	Tony Wallis (Lab)	Denise Jeffery (Lab)

== Ward results ==
2021 Wakefield Metropolitan District Council election
Party	Candidate	Votes	%	±%
Labour	Richard Forster	2,092	62.4	+19.7
Conservative	Joanne Smart	731	21.8	+13.7
Yorkshire	Paul Phelps	389	11.6	−9.8
Green	Alan Horne	140	4.2	+4.2
Majority		1361	40.6	+20.7
Turnout		3352	26.4	+1.1
Labour hold		Swing	+3.0	

2019 Wakefield Metropolitan District Council election
Party	Candidate	Votes	%	±%
Labour	Tony Wallis	1316	42.7	−18.2
UKIP	Lawrence Burrows	828	26.9	+26.9
Yorkshire	Paul Phelps	689	22.4	−2.8
Conservative	Joanne Smart	249	8.1	−5.8
Majority		488	15.8	−19.9
Turnout		3082	25.3	+2.9
Rejected ballots		13		
Labour hold		Swing		

2018 Wakefield Metropolitan District Council election
Party	Candidate	Votes	%	±%
Labour	Denise Jeffrey	1652	60.9	−8.1
Yorkshire	Paul Phelps	684	25.2	N/A
Conservative	Joanne Smart	377	13.9	+6.1
Majority		968	35.7	−10.1
Turnout		2713	22.4	−4.3
Rejected ballots		8		
Labour hold		Swing		

2016 Wakefield Metropolitan District Council election
Party	Candidate	Votes	%	±%
Labour	Richard Forster	2133	69.0	+6.3
UKIP	Dawn Lumb	718	23.2	−1.6
Conservative	Joanne Smart	241	7.8	−4.7
Majority		1415	45.8	+7.9
Turnout		3092	27.0	−25.4
Labour hold		Swing		

2015 Wakefield Metropolitan District Council election
Party	Candidate	Votes	%	±%
Labour	Tony Wallis	4015	62.7	+7.8
UKIP	Dawn Lumb	1590	24.8	−12.6
Conservative	Eamonn Mullins	798	12.5	+4.8
Majority		2425	37.9	+20.4
Turnout		6403	52.4	+25.6
Labour hold		Swing		

2014 Wakefield Metropolitan District Council election
Party	Candidate	Votes	%	±%
Labour	Denise Jeffrey	1775	54.9	−21.4
UKIP	Dawn Lumb	1211	37.4	+21.5
Conservative	Eamonn Mullins	249	7.7	−0.1
Majority		564	17.5	−42.9
Turnout		3235	26.8	+2.0
Labour hold		Swing		

By-Election: 21 February 2013
Party	Candidate	Votes	%	±%
Labour	Richard Forster	1,567	76.7	
UKIP	Nathan Garbutt	349	17.1	
Conservative	Anne-Marie Glover	95	4.6	
Liberal Democrats	Mark Goodair	33	1.6	
Majority		1218	60.0	
Turnout		2,044	16.9	
Labour hold		Swing		

This by-election was caused by the resignation of Mark Burns-Williamson as he successfully ran to be West Yorkshire Police and Crime Commissioner.

2012 Wakefield Metropolitan District Council election
Party	Candidate	Votes	%	±%
Labour	Mark Burns-Williamson	2,306	76.3	+2.1
UKIP	Alison Bullivant	482	15.9	+2.5
Conservative	Eamonn Mullins	235	7.8	−4.2
Majority		1,824	60.3	−0.5
Turnout		3,023	24.8	
Labour hold		Swing		

2011 Wakefield Metropolitan District Council election
Party	Candidate	Votes	%	±%
Labour	Tony Wallis	2,641	74.2	+11.1
UKIP	Alison Bullivant	477	13.4	+13.4
Conservative	Eamonn Mullins	426	12	−6.4
Majority		2,164	60.8	+16.1
Turnout		3,558	54.5	−24.9
Labour hold		Swing		

2010 Wakefield Metropolitan District Council election
Party	Candidate	Votes	%	±%
Labour	Denise Jeffery	4,146	63.1	
Conservative	Eamonn Mullins	1,209	18.4	
BNP	Rita Robinson	1,147	17.5	
Majority		2,937	44.7	
Turnout		6,573	54.5	
Labour hold		Swing		

2008 Wakefield Metropolitan District Council election
Party	Candidate	Votes	%	±%
Labour	Mark Burns-Williamson	1,775	54.1	−9.3
BNP	Rita Robinson	854	26.1	+3.4
Conservative	Eamonn Mullins	649	19.8	+6.0
Majority		921	28.0	−12.7
Turnout		3,278		
Labour hold		Swing		

2007 Wakefield Metropolitan District Council election
Party	Candidate	Votes	%	±%
Labour	Tony Wallis	2,077	63.4	+10.6
BNP	Rita Robinson	745	22.7	−1.9
Conservative	Tony Ayoade	453	13.8	+4.5
Majority		1,332	40.7	+12.5
Turnout		3,275		
Labour hold		Swing		

2006 Wakefield Metropolitan District Council election
Party	Candidate	Votes	%	±%
Labour	Denise Jeffery	1,884	52.8	
BNP	Rita Robinson	876	24.6	
Liberal Democrats	Michael Mann	475	13.3	
Conservative	Rebecca Mullins	333	9.3	
Majority		1,008	28.2	
Turnout		3,568		
Labour hold		Swing		

2004 Wakefield Metropolitan District Council election
Party	Candidate	Votes	%	±%
Labour	Mark Burns-Williamson	2,797		
Labour	Anthony Wallis	2,692		
Labour	Denise Jeffery	2,286		
BNP	Rita Robinson	948		
Conservative	Stanley Hick	507		
Conservative	Val Moorey	484		
Conservative	Joan Revitt	483		
Turnout		10,197	36.7	
