= Normanton (electoral ward) =

Coordinates: 53.697°N 1.416°W

- Location within West Yorkshire
- Metropolitan borough: City of Wakefield
- Metropolitan county: West Yorkshire
- Region: Yorkshire and the Humber
- Country: England
- Sovereign state: United Kingdom
- Police: West Yorkshire
- Fire: West Yorkshire
- Ambulance: Yorkshire
- UK Parliament: Normanton and Hemsworth

Normanton is an electoral ward of the City of Wakefield district used for elections to Wakefield Metropolitan District Council.

== Overview ==
The ward is one of 21 in the Wakefield district, and has been held by Labour since the current boundaries were formed for the 2004 Council election. The predecessor ward was Normanton and Sharlston. As of 2019, the electorate stands at 12,315 of which 92.7% identify as "White British" and 67.9% of who identify as Christian.

The ward comprises Normanton, Kirkthorpe, Woodhouse, Warmfield cum Heath and Ashfield with the key landmarks being Normanton railway station, All Saints' Church and Kirkthorpe Hydro.

== Representation ==
Like all wards in the Wakefield district, Normanton has 3 councillors, whom are elected on a 4-year-rota. This means elections for new councillors are held for three years running, with one year every four years having no elections.

The current councillors are Julie Medford, Armaan Khan and Daniel Wilton all of whom are Labour.

== Councillors ==
Election	Councillor	Councillor	Councillor
2004	Barry Smith (Lab)	Graeme Milner (Ind)	Peter Loosemore (Lab)
2006	Barry Smith (Lab)	Graeme Milner (Ind)	Elaine Blezzard (Lab)
2007	Barry Smith (Lab)	David Dagger (Lab)	Elaine Blezzard (Lab)
2008	Barry Smith (Lab)	David Dagger (Lab)	Elaine Blezzard (Lab)
2010	Barry Smith (Lab)	David Dagger (Lab)	Elaine Blezzard (Lab)
2011	Barry Smith (Lab)	David Dagger (Lab)	Elaine Blezzard (Lab)
2012	Alan Wassall (Lab)	David Dagger (Lab)	Elaine Blezzard (Lab)
2014	Alan Wassall (Lab)	David Dagger (Lab)	Elaine Blezzard (Lab)
2015	Alan Wassall (Lab)	David Dagger (Lab)	Elaine Blezzard (Lab)
2016	Alan Wassall (Lab)	David Dagger (Lab)	Elaine Blezzard (Lab)
2018	Alan Wassall (Lab)	David Dagger (Lab)	Elaine Blezzard (Lab)
2019	Alan Wassall (Lab)	David Dagger (Lab)	Elaine Blezzard (Lab)
2021	Julie Medford (Lab)	David Dagger (Lab)	Elaine Blezzard (Lab)
2022	Julie Medford (Lab)	David Dagger (Lab)	Isabel Owen (Lab)
2023	Julie Medford (Lab)	Armaan Khan (Lab)	Isabel Owen (Lab)
2024	Julie Medford (Lab)	Armaan Khan (Lab)	Daniel Wilton (Lab)

== Ward results ==
2024 Wakefield election
Party	Candidate	Votes	%	±%
Labour Co-op	Julie Medford*	1,709	71.1	+24.0
Labour Co-op	Daniel Wilton	1,303	54.2	+7.1
Wakefield Ind.	Cliff Parsons	584	24.3	+4.8
Green	John Clayton	426	17.7	+11.2
Conservative	Chad Thomas	406	16.9	–1.6
Conservative	Tomas Mestre	379	15.8	–2.7
Turnout		?	37.0	+16.2
Labour Co-op hold				
Labour Co-op hold				

2023 Wakefield Metropolitan District Council election
Party	Candidate	Votes	%	±%
Labour	Armaan Khan	1,258	47.1	+1.5
Wakefield District Independents	Cliff Parsons	520	19.5	−21.0
Conservative	Laura Weldon	494	18.5	+4.5
Liberal Democrats	Nigel James Ebbs	225	8.4	New
Green	John Robert Clayton	175	6.5	New
Majority		738	27.6	
Turnout		2,672	20.8	
Rejected ballots		13		
Labour hold		Swing		

2022 Wakefield Metropolitan District Council election
Party	Candidate	Votes	%	±%
Labour	Isabel Owen	1,735	56.8	+5.0
Conservative	James Hardwick	697	22.8	−8.2
Independent	Cliff Parsons	280	9.2	+2.1
Liberal Democrats	Deborah Goodall	183	6.0	+3.3
Green	John Clayton	161	5.3	−0.9
Majority		1,038	34.0	
Turnout		3,056	23.8	
Labour hold		Swing	▲6.6	

Isabel Owen was the Deputy Police and Crime Commissioner for West Yorkshire under Mark Burns-Williamson.

2021 Wakefield Metropolitan District Council election
Party	Candidate	Votes	%	±%
Labour	Julie Medford	1,785	51.8	+6.2
Conservative	Keith Hudson	1,069	31.0	−9.5
Alliance for Democracy and Freedom (UK)	Cliff Parsons	246	7.1	+7.1
Green	Gillian Dewey-Nager	214	6.2	+6.2
Liberal Democrats	Susan Hayes	92	2.7	+2.7
Workers Party	Marcus Whalley-Reid	43	1.2	+1.2
Majority		716	20.8	+15.7
Turnout		3,449	27.1	+3.7
Labour hold				

Labour's Julie Medford held the seat after the death of the former councillor Alan Wassell.

2019 Wakefield Metropolitan District Council election
Party	Candidate	Votes	%	±%
Labour	David Dagger	1322	45.6	−25.2
UKIP	Cliff Parsons	1174	40.5	+40.5
Conservative	Luke Thomas	405	14.0	−15.2
Majority		148	5.1	−36.5
Turnout		2901	23.4	+3.1
Rejected ballots		37		
Labour hold		Swing		

2018 Wakefield Metropolitan District Council election
Party	Candidate	Votes	%	±%
Labour	(Susan) Elaine Blezard	1777	70.8	−4.5
Conservative	Hilary Plumber	733	29.2	+4.5
Majority		1044	41.6	−9
Turnout		2510	20.3	−3.6
Rejected ballots		21		
Labour hold		Swing		

2016 Wakefield Metropolitan District Council election
Party	Candidate	Votes	%	±%
Labour	Alan Wassell	2147	54.4	+20.9
Conservative	Matthew Gilligan	706	24.7	+5.7
Majority		1441	50.6	+22.8
Turnout		2853	23.9	−28.2
Labour hold		Swing		

2015 Wakefield Metropolitan District Council election
Party	Candidate	Votes	%	±%
Labour	David Dagger	3585	54.4	−20.2
UKIP	Colin Wroe	1752	26.6	N/A
Conservative	Jean Molloy	1251	19.0	−6.4
Majority		1833	27.8	−21.4
Turnout		6588	52.1	+28.5
Labour hold		Swing		

2014 Wakefield Metropolitan District Council election
Party	Candidate	Votes	%	±%
Labour	Elaine Blezard	2192	74.6	+11.7
Conservative	Richard Wakefield	747	25.4	+13.5
Majority		1445	49.2	+11.5
Turnout		2939	23.6	+1.3
Labour hold		Swing		

2012 Wakefield Metropolitan District Council election
Party	Candidate	Votes	%	±%
Labour	Alan Wassell	1,775	62.9	−1
UKIP	Bryan Barkley	712	25.2	+7.9
Conservative	Emma-Jane Lisle	337	11.9	−6.4
Majority		1,063	37.6	−8
Turnout		2,824	22.3	−6.2
Labour hold		Swing		

2011 Wakefield Metropolitan District Council election
Party	Candidate	Votes	%	±%
Labour	David Dagger	2,266	63.9	+16.9
Conservative	Jean Molloy	649	18.3	−2.2
UKIP	Bryan Barkley	613	17.3	+17.3
Majority		1,617	45.6	+19.1
Turnout		3,546	28.5	−25.1
Labour hold		Swing		

2010 Wakefield Metropolitan District Council election
Party	Candidate	Votes	%	±%
Labour	Elaine Blezard	3,139	47.0	
Conservative	Jean Molloy	1,370	20.5	
Independent	Graeme Milner	1,231	18.4	
BNP	Philip Downton	885	13.3	
Majority		1,769	26.5	
Turnout		6,674	53.6	
Labour hold		Swing		

2008 Wakefield Metropolitan District Council election
Party	Candidate	Votes	%	±%
Labour	Barry Smith	1,037	31.8	−8.2
Conservative	Richard Wakefield	784	24.0	+12.4
Independent	Graeme Milner	699	21.4	−3.5
BNP	Adam Frazer	520	15.9	−0.1
Liberal Democrats	Jack Smith	221	6.8	−0.7
Majority		253	7.8	−7.3
Turnout		3,261		
Labour hold		Swing		

2007 Wakefield Metropolitan District Council election
Party	Candidate	Votes	%	±%
Labour	David Dagger	1,218	40.0	−3.3
Independent	Graeme Milner	758	24.9	+11.3
BNP	Adam Frazer	488	16.0	−5.1
Conservative	Michael Ledgard	353	11.6	−1.9
Liberal Democrats	Jack Smith	230	7.5	−1.1
Majority		460	15.1	−7.1
Turnout		3,047		
Labour gain from Independent		Swing		

2006 Wakefield Metropolitan District Council election
Party	Candidate	Votes	%	±%
Labour	(Susan) Elaine Blezard	1,370	43.3	
BNP	Adam Frazer	667	21.1	
Independent	William Wood	432	13.6	
Conservative	Tony Ayoade	426	13.5	
Liberal Democrats	Jack Smith	272	8.6	
Majority		703	22.2	
Turnout		3,167		
Labour hold		Swing		

2004 Wakefield Metropolitan District Council election
Party	Candidate	Votes	%	±%
Labour	Barry Smith	2,105		
Independent	Graeme Milner	1,694		
Labour	Peter Loosemore	1,627		
Labour	Christine Sharman	1,463		
Conservative	Sue Mountain	877		
Conservative	Betty Charlesworth	611		
Conservative	John Scollan	555		
Turnout		8,932	33.1	
