= Pontefract, Castleford and Knottingley =

UK Parliament constituency (since 2024)

Coordinates: 53.7°N 1.32°W

- County constituency for the House of Commons
- Boundaries since 2024
- County: West Yorkshire
- Major settlements: Pontefract; Castleford; Knottingley

Current constituency
- Created: 2024
- Member of Parliament: Yvette Cooper (Labour)
- Seats: One
- Created from: Normanton, Pontefract and Castleford

Pontefract, Castleford and Knottingley is a constituency (Note: A county constituency (for the purposes of election expenses and type of returning officer)) in West Yorkshire of the House of Commons of the UK Parliament. Further to the completion of the 2023 Periodic Review of Westminster constituencies, it was first contested at the 2024 general election. It is currently represented by Yvette Cooper of the Labour Party, (Note: As with all constituencies, the constituency elects one Member of Parliament (MP) by the first past the post system of election at least every five years.) who is currently serving as Health Secretary under the government of Andy Burnham. She previously served as Home Secretary and Foreign Secretary under the government of Keir Starmer. Cooper was MP for the predecessor seats of Normanton, Pontefract and Castleford from 2010 to 2024, and Pontefract and Castleford from 1997 to 2010.

== Constituency profile ==
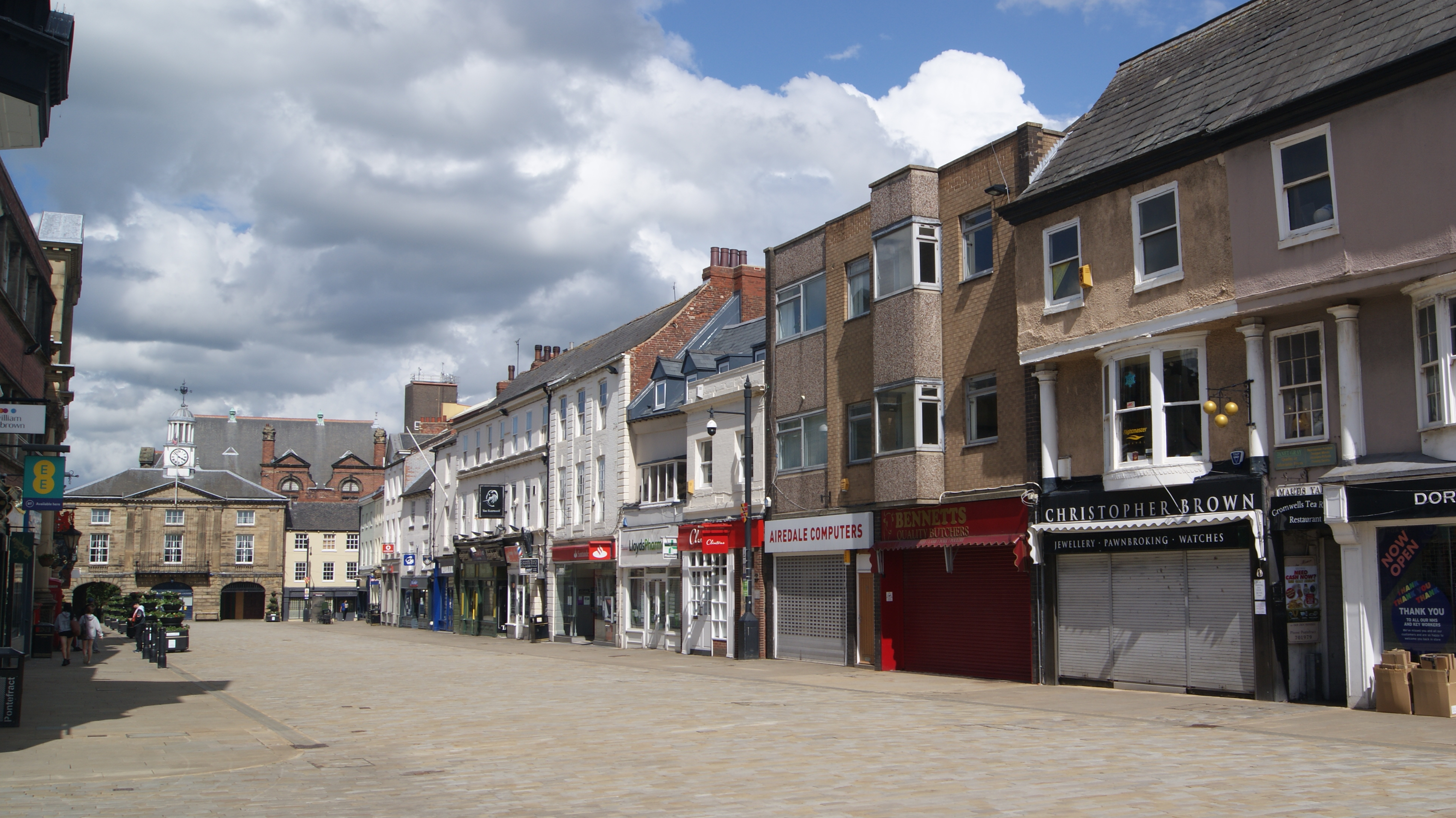
Pontefract Market Place

Pontefract, Castleford and Knottingley is a constituency in West Yorkshire in England, within the City of Wakefield metropolitan borough. It is named after the three towns that make up the constituency, Pontefract, Castleford and Knottingley, of which Castleford is the largest with a population of around 48,000. It is one of two Westminster parliamentary constituencies outside Scotland two contain three place-names in their official name (the other is Ruislip, Norwood and Pinner). The constituency also includes the village of Altofts.

This constituency's towns have a history of coal mining, an industry that drove the towns' expansion during the Victorian era but mostly disappeared by the late 20th century. This led to high rates of unemployment and the towns are still highly-deprived today. Whilst Castleford was mostly developed during the industrial era, Pontefract is a market town with historic origins. Knottingley was traditionally an important inland port on the River Aire. The constituency has some affluent areas, Altofts and the outer suburbs of Pontefract in particular. House prices across the constituency are generally lower than the rest of Yorkshire and the average price is around half the UK average.

Residents of Pontefract, Castleford and Knottingley have a similar age profile to the rest of the country. Household income is generally low and residents have average rates of homeownership. The child poverty rate is above-average. Residents have low levels of education and a high proportion work in the manufacturing, retail and transport sectors. The percentage claiming unemployment benefits is in line with the overall UK figure. White people made up 96% of the population at the 2021 census.

At the local council, most of the constituency is represented by Reform UK councillors, although some Liberal Democrats were elected in Knottingley. Voters in the constituency overwhelmingly supported leaving the European Union in the 2016 referendum; an estimated 70% voted in favour of Brexit compared to the UK-wide figure of 52%, making Pontefract, Castleford and Knottingley one of the top 20 most Brexit-supporting constituencies out of 650 nationwide according to Electoral Calculus.

== Boundaries ==
The constituency is composed of the following wards of the City of Wakefield (as they existed on 1 December 2020):

- Airedale and Ferry Fryston
- Altofts and Whitwood
- Castleford Central and Glasshoughton
- Knottingley
- Pontefract North
- Pontefract South

It comprises the former Normanton, Pontefract and Castleford seat excluding the Normanton ward, which includes the town of Normanton and the civil parishes of Warmfield cum Heath and Kirkthorpe.

== Members of Parliament ==
Normanton, Pontefract & Castleford prior to 2024

Election	Member	Party
2024	Yvette Cooper	Labour

== Elections ==
=== Elections in the 2020s ===
General election 2024: Pontefract, Castleford and Knottingley
Party	Candidate	Votes	%	±%
Labour	Yvette Cooper	17,089	47.5	+9.3
Reform	John Thomas	10,459	29.1	+13.3
Conservative	Laura Weldon	5,406	15.0	−20.6
Green	Olli Watkins	1,651	4.6	N/A
Liberal Democrats	Jamie Needle	1,213	3.4	−3.4
SDP	Trevor Lake	139	0.4	N/A
Majority		6,630	18.4	+15.8
Turnout		35,957	48.2	−8.5
Registered electors		74,618		
Labour hold		Swing	−2.0	

=== Elections in the 2010s ===
2019 notional result
Party	Vote	%
Labour	15,759	38.2
Conservative	14,677	35.6
Brexit Party	6,518	15.8
Liberal Democrats	2,799	6.8
Others	1,515	3.7
Turnout	41,268	56.7
Electorate	72,751	

== See also ==
- List of parliamentary constituencies in West Yorkshire
- List of parliamentary constituencies in the Yorkshire and the Humber (region)

== Notes ==
Parliament of the United Kingdom
Preceded by Tottenham	Constituency represented by the foreign secretary 2025–2026	Succeeded by Doncaster North
