= 2018 Wakefield Metropolitan District Council election =

Local election in England

2018 local election results in Wakefield

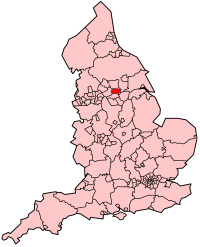
Wakefield Council on UK wide map

The 2018 Wakefield Metropolitan Borough Council election took place on 3 May 2018 to elect members of Wakefield Metropolitan District Council in England. The election was held on the same day as other local elections. The Labour Party and the Conservative Party fielded a full slate of 21 candidates, as well as 12 Liberal Democrats, 6 Yorkshire Party candidates, 4 Green Party candidates, 3 UK Independence Party candidates, 1 Trade Unionist and Socialist Coalition candidate and 1 Democrats and Veteran's Party candidate.

== Council make-up ==
The make up of the Council following the election was:

Party political make-up of Wakefield Council
Party	Seats				Current Council (2018)
Party	2014	2015	2016	2018	Current Council (2018)
Labour	54	53	53	52	
Conservative	6	6	7	11	
UKIP	2	2	2	0	
Independent	1	2	1	0	

== Summary ==
Wakefield local election result 2018
Party	Seats	Gains	Losses	Net gain/loss	Seats %	Votes %	Votes	+/−
Labour	16	1	2	-1	76	51.7	35,344	-1.7
Conservative	5	4	0	+4	24	34.0	23,236	+10.7
Liberal Democrats	0	0	0	0	0	4.9	3347	+1.4
Independent	0	0	1	-1	0	3.9	2633	+0.0
Yorkshire	0	0	0	0	0	3.0	2023	+1.3
UKIP	0	0	2	-2	0	1.1	766	-10.4
Green	0	0	0	0	0	1.1	749	+0.0
Democrats and Veterans	0	0	0	0	0	0.2	140	+0.2
TUSC	0	0	0	0	0	0.2	135	-1.2

- +/- compared with Wakefield Council election 2016.

== Results by ward ==
Changes compared to 2014.

Ackworth, North Elmsall and Upton
Party	Candidate	Votes	%	±%
Labour	Allan Garbutt	1,383	42.3	▼0.9
Conservative	Philip Davies	817	25.0	▲2.8
Independent	Gwen Marshall	461	14.1	New
Yorkshire	Martin Roberts	286	8.8	New
Green	George Scogings	202	6.2	New
Liberal Democrats	Mary MacQueen	119	3.6	New
Majority		566	17.3	▲8.7
Turnout		3,268	25.3	▼4.9
Rejected ballots		5		
Labour hold		Swing	▼1.9	

Airedale and Ferry Fryston
Party	Candidate	Votes	%	±%
Labour	Kathryn Scott	1,662	76.2	▲21.8
Conservative	Eamonn Mullins	520	23.8	▲14.7
Majority		1,142	52.4	▲34.5
Turnout		2,182	18.9	▼6.1
Rejected ballots		10		
Labour hold		Swing	▲4.0	

Altofts and Whitwood
Party	Candidate	Votes	%	±%
Labour	Jacquie Speight	1,823	57.5	▲8.1
Conservative	Anthony Hill	888	28.0	▲13.9
Yorkshire	Steven Crookes	320	10.1	New
Democrats and Veterans	John Thomas	140	4.4	New
Majority		935	29.5	▲16.7
Turnout		3,171	23.9	▼3.8
Rejected ballots		9		
Labour hold		Swing	▼2.9	

Castleford Central and Glasshoughton
Party	Candidate	Votes	%	±%
Labour	Denise Jeffrey	1,652	60.9	▲6.0
Yorkshire	Paul Phelps	684	25.2	New
Conservative	Joanne Smart	377	13.9	▲6.2
Majority		968	35.7	▲18.2
Turnout		2,713	22.4	▼4.4
Rejected ballots		8		
Labour hold		Swing	▼9.6	

Crofton, Ryhill and Walton
Party	Candidate	Votes	%	±%
Labour	Albert Manifield	1,958	54.1	▲14.7
Conservative	Susan Lodge	1,268	35.0	▲15.2
Liberal Democrats	Adam Belcher	396	10.9	▲5.5
Majority		690	19.1	▲15.1
Turnout		3,622	29.7	▼4.4
Rejected ballots		11		
Labour hold		Swing	▼0.3	

Featherstone
Party	Candidate	Votes	%	±%
Labour	Richard Taylor	2,238	75.8	▼4.8
Conservative	Diane Dolby	716	24.2	▲4.8
Majority		1,522	51.6	▼9.6
Turnout		2,954	22.7	▼3.3
Rejected ballots		38		
Labour hold		Swing	▼4.8	

Hemsworth
Party	Candidate	Votes	%	±%
Labour	Sandra Pickin	1,512	54.7	▲0.8
Independent	Ian Womersley	1,012	36.6	New
Conservative	Terry Brown	241	8.7	▼0.8
Majority		500	18.1	▲0.8
Turnout		2,765	23.3	▼2.8
Rejected ballots		3		
Labour hold		Swing	▼17.9	

Horbury and South Ossett
Party	Candidate	Votes	%	±%
Conservative	Gillian Cruise	1,790	44.7	▲23.6
Labour	Melanie Jones	1,583	39.5	▼1.8
Liberal Democrats	Mark Goodair	432	10.8	▲5.4
Green	Richard Norris	202	5.0	New
Majority		207	5.2	New
Turnout		4,007	33.6	▲0.9
Rejected ballots		11		
Conservative gain from Labour		Swing	▲12.7	

Knottingley
Party	Candidate	Votes	%	±%
Labour	Harry Ellis	1,419	66.6	▼11.3
Conservative	Joshua Spencer	713	33.4	▲11.3
Majority		706	33.2	▼22.6
Turnout		2,132	20.7	▼3.5
Rejected ballots		29		
Labour hold		Swing	▼11.3	

Normanton
Party	Candidate	Votes	%	±%
Labour	Susan Blezard	1,777	70.8	▼3.8
Conservative	Hilary Plumbley	733	29.2	▲3.8
Majority		1,044	41.6	▼7.6
Turnout		2,510	20.3	▼3.3
Rejected ballots		21		
Labour hold		Swing	▼3.8	

Ossett
Party	Candidate	Votes	%	±%
Conservative	Nick Farmer	2,124	51.0	▲23.4
Labour Co-op	Kerron Cross	1,543	37.0	▲6.3
Liberal Democrats	Tony Sargeant	499	12.0	▲5.1
Majority		581	14.0	New
Turnout		4,166	33.2	▼0.5
Rejected ballots		12		
Conservative gain from UKIP		Swing	▲8.6	

Farmer was first elected as a UKIP Councillor for Ossett in 2014, but resigned his membership in 2017 and later joined the Conservatives.

Pontefract North
Party	Candidate	Votes	%	±%
Labour	Clive Tennant	1,724	60.2	▲11.6
Conservative	Chris Hyomes	714	24.9	▲11.2
Yorkshire	Arnie Craven	266	9.3	New
Green	Rennie Smith	162	5.7	New
Majority		1,010	35.3	▲22.3
Turnout		2,866	22.5	▼5.8
Rejected ballots		3		
Labour hold		Swing	▲0.2	

Pontefract South
Party	Candidate	Votes	%	±%
Labour	George Ayre	2,000	52.2	▲10.4
Conservative	Amy Swift	1,646	42.9	▲9.0
Liberal Democrats	Daniel Woodlock	188	4.9	New
Majority		354	9.3	▲1.4
Turnout		3,834	31.9	▼3.6
Rejected ballots		23		
Labour hold		Swing	▲0.7	

South Elmsall and South Kirkby
Party	Candidate	Votes	%	±%
Labour	Lynne Whitehouse	1,755	55.1	▲13.5
Independent	Wilf Benson	844	26.5	▼24.5
Conservative	Dianne Presha	269	8.4	▲1.0
Independent	Laurie Harrison	233	7.3	New
Independent	Jim Kenyon	83	2.6	New
Majority		911	28.6	New
Turnout		3,184	23.4	▼3.4
Rejected ballots		7		
Labour gain from Independent Politician		Swing	▲19.0	

Harrison stood as Labour candidate for South Elmsall and South Kirby in 2014.

Stanley and Outwood East
Party	Candidate	Votes	%	±%
Labour	Jacqui Williams	1,700	48.7	▼3.6
Conservative	Nathaniel Harvey	1,230	35.2	▲3.7
Liberal Democrats	Nicola Sinclair	352	10.1	▲2.3
UKIP	James Johnston	209	6.0	New
Majority		470	13.5	▼7.3
Turnout		3,491	27.8	▼3.2
Rejected ballots		8		
Labour hold		Swing	▼3.7	

Wakefield East
Party	Candidate	Votes	%	±%
Labour	Olivia Rowley	1,918	64.9	▲12.7
Conservative	Richard Wakefield	594	20.1	▲4.4
Green	Jody Gabriel	183	6.2	New
TUSC	Michael Griffiths	135	4.6	▲1.0
Liberal Democrats	Margaret Dodd	124	4.2	New
Majority		1,324	44.8	▲21.1
Turnout		2,954	26.0	▼4.4
Rejected ballots		15		
Labour hold		Swing	▲4.2	

Wakefield North
Party	Candidate	Votes	%	±%
Labour	Tracey Austin	1,660	54.2	▲10.2
Conservative	Antony Calvert	890	29.1	▲12.5
Yorkshire	Lucy Brown	223	7.3	New
UKIP	Keith Wells	166	5.4	▼24.6
Liberal Democrats	Natasha de Vere	121	4.0	▼1.4
Majority		770	25.1	▲11.1
Turnout		3,060	26.3	▼4.2
Rejected ballots		13		
Labour hold		Swing	▼1.2	

Wakefield Rural
Party	Candidate	Votes	%	±%
Conservative	Samantha Harvey	2,625	54.3	▲16.9
Labour	Kevin Barker	1,781	36.8	▼2.3
Liberal Democrats	Finbarr Cronin	431	8.9	▲2.5
Majority		844	17.5	New
Turnout		4,837	35.1	▲2.6
Rejected ballots		14		
Conservative gain from Labour		Swing	▲9.6	

Wakefield South
Party	Candidate	Votes	%	±%
Conservative	Nadeem Ahmed	2,209	56.7	▲17.0
Labour	Gwen Page	1,250	32.1	▲2.2
Yorkshire	Daniel Cochran	234	6.0	New
Liberal Democrats	David Currie	205	5.3	▲0.4
Majority		959	24.6	▲14.8
Turnout		3,898	37.0	▼2.2
Rejected ballots		6		
Conservative hold		Swing	▲7.4	

Wakefield West
Party	Candidate	Votes	%	±%
Labour	Kevin Swift	1,478	51.6	▲5.3
Conservative	Nathan Garbutt Moore	1,183	41.3	▲14.1
Liberal Democrats	John Clayton	203	7.1	▲1.8
Majority		295	10.3	▼8.8
Turnout		2,864	26.1	▼3.0
Rejected ballots		8		
Labour hold		Swing	▼4.4	

Wrenthorpe and Outwood West
Party	Candidate	Votes	%	±%
Conservative	Nic Stansby	1,689	44.0	▲20.7
Labour	Christine Sharman	1,528	39.8	▲6.7
UKIP	David Dews	391	10.2	▼28.4
Liberal Democrats	Esther Amis-Hughes	227	5.9	▲1.0
Majority		161	4.2	New
Turnout		3,835	31.4	▼2.7
Rejected ballots		6		
Conservative gain from UKIP		Swing	▲7.0	
