= 2024 Wakefield Metropolitan District Council election =

2024 UK local government election

- 2 May 2024

22 out of 63 seats to Wakefield Metropolitan District Council 32 seats needed for a majority

	First party	Second party
Leader	Denise Jeffrey	Nadeem Ahmed
Party	Labour	Conservative
Last election	49 seats, 52.7%	7 seats, 21.7%
Seats before	47	5
Seats won	21	0
Seats after	56	3
Seat change	▲9	▼2
Popular vote	36,875	12,828
Percentage	53.9%	18.8%
Swing	▲1.2%	▼2.9%
	Third party	Fourth party
Leader	Peter Girt
Party	Liberal Democrats	Independent
Last election	3 seats, 5.1%	4 seats, 8.3%
Seats before	3	8
Seats won	1	0
Seats after	3	1
Seat change	Steady	▼7
Popular vote	2,125	304
Percentage	3.1%	0.4%
Swing	▼2.0%	▼7.9%
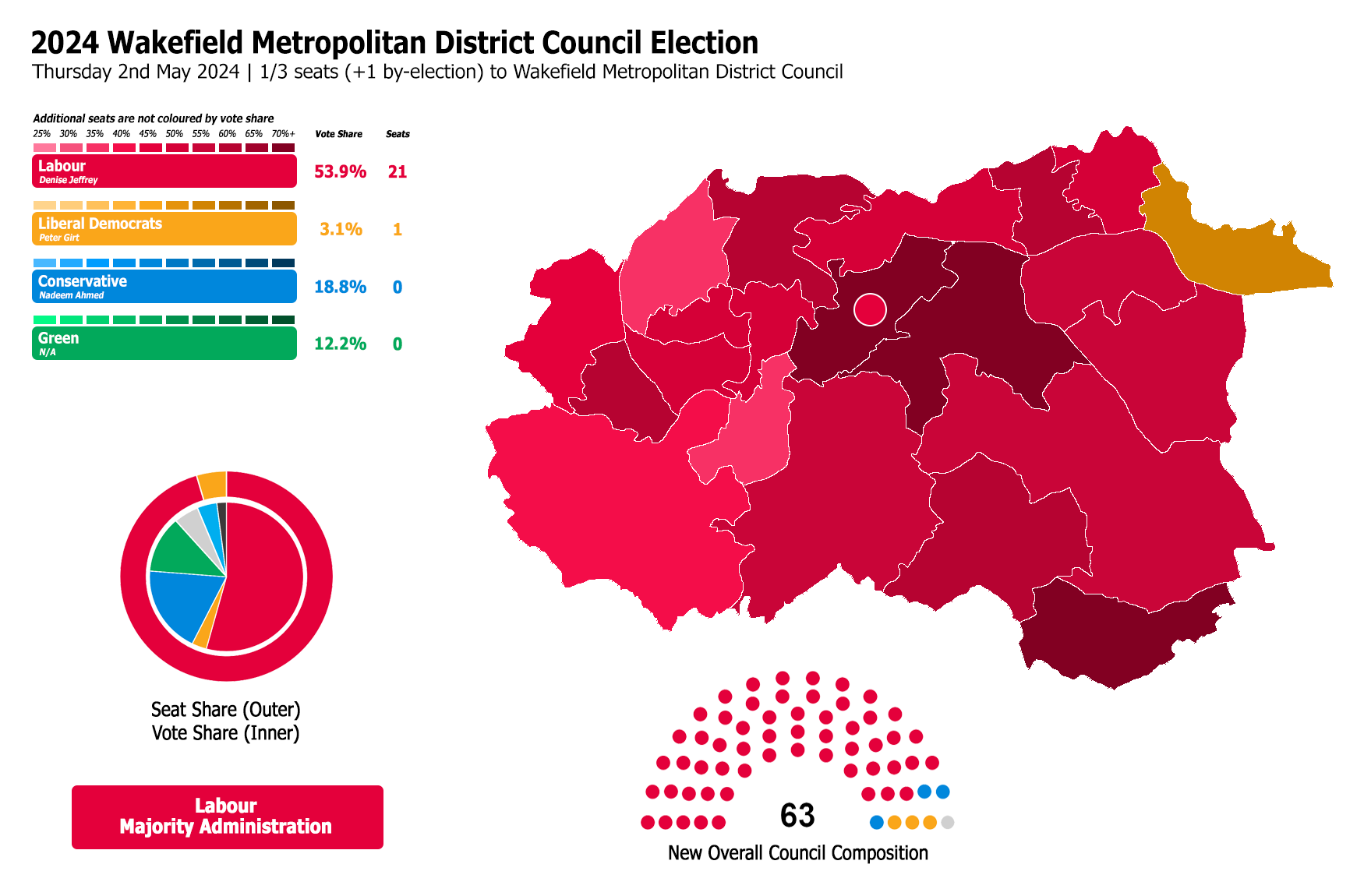
- Winner of each seat at the 2024 Wakefield Metropolitan District Council election
Leader before election
Denise Jeffrey
Labour
Leader after election
Denise Jeffrey
Labour

The 2024 Wakefield Metropolitan District Council election took place on 2 May 2024 to elect members of Wakefield Council, alongside the other local elections across the United Kingdom being held on the same day. There were 22 of the 63 seats on Wakefield council up for election, being the usual third of the council plus a by-election in Normanton ward.

Labour won 21 of the 22 seats available, maintaining their overall control on the council which they have held since the modern district's formation in 1974.

== Background ==
These seats were last contested at the 2021 local election, in which Labour Lost 7 seats, whilst the Conservatives gained 6 seats and the Liberal Democrats gained one seat.

Labour have controlled the council since its formation in 1974.

== Election result ==
Wakefield Council's composition following the 2024 election.

The results were announced the day after the election.

2024 Wakefield Metropolitan District Council election
Party	This election			Full council			This election		
Party	Seats	Net	Seats %	Other	Total	Total %	Votes	Votes %	+/−
Labour	21	▲9	95.5	35	56	88.9	36,875	53.9	+1.2
Conservative	0	▼2	0.0	3	3	4.8	12,828	18.8	–2.9
Liberal Democrats	1	Steady	4.5	2	3	4.8	2,125	3.1	–2.0
Independent	0	▼7	0.0	0	1	1.6	304	0.4	–7.9
Green	0	Steady	0.0	0	0	0.0	8,312	12.2	+5.0
Wakefield Ind.	0	Steady	0.0	0	0	0.0	3,602	5.3	N/A
Yorkshire	0	Steady	0.0	0	0	0.0	2,778	4.1	+0.2
Reform	0	Steady	0.0	0	0	0.0	924	1.4	+0.7
TUSC	0	Steady	0.0	0	0	0.0	440	0.6	+0.3

== Ward results ==
The results of the election were announced on 3 May 2024.

Seat gains and losses for each ward are calculated based on the party affiliation of the incumbent councillor as they were directly after the 2023 election. Due to this, they may not match the gains/losses in the election result table or the page's infobox, as some councillors may have switched their party affiliation post-2023 election.

=== Ackworth, North Elmsall and Upton ===
Ackworth, North Elmsall and Upton
Party	Candidate	Votes	%	±%
Labour	Martin Roberts	1,719	57.4	+10.9
Green	Jody Gabriel	663	22.2	+12.4
Conservative	Dylan Nykamp	611	20.4	+2.7
Majority		1,056	35.2	+6.1
Turnout		2,993	22.4	–1.5
Labour gain from Conservative		Swing	▼0.8	

=== Airedale and Ferry Fryston ===
Airedale and Ferry Fryston
Party	Candidate	Votes	%	±%
Labour	Jackie Ferguson*	1,135	51.1	+2.5
Wakefield Ind.	Neil Kennedy	800	36.0	+3.5
Conservative	Eamonnn Mullins	171	7.7	–4.1
Green	John Ingham	115	5.2	+1.2
Majority		335	15.1	–1.0
Turnout		2,221	19.1	+0.1
Labour hold		Swing	▼0.5	

=== Altofts and Whitwood ===
Altofts and Whitwood
Party	Candidate	Votes	%	±%
Labour	Josie Pritchard*	1,684	52.7	–0.1
Wakefield Ind.	John Thomas	828	25.9	+1.6
Conservative	Peter Forster	451	14.1	–1.6
Green	Krys Holmes	233	7.3	+0.1
Majority		856	26.8	–1.7
Turnout		3,196	21.9	–1.1
Labour hold		Swing	▼0.9	

=== Castleford Central and Glasshoughton ===
Castleford Central and Glasshoughton
Party	Candidate	Votes	%	±%
Labour	Richard Forster*	1,713	64.1	+2.0
Yorkshire	Paul Phelps	558	20.9	+4.6
Conservative	Joanne Smart	242	9.1	–4.7
Green	Stephen Brennan	158	5.9	+1.6
Majority		1,155	43.2	–2.6
Turnout		2,671	21.0	–0.3
Labour hold		Swing	▼1.3	

=== Crofton, Ryhill and Walton ===
Crofton, Ryhill and Walton
Party	Candidate	Votes	%	±%
Labour	Faith Heptinsall	1,918	58.2	–0.4
Conservative	Elizabeth Cowton	971	29.5	+3.4
Green	Garry Newby	406	12.3	+5.1
Majority		947	28.7	–3.8
Turnout		3,295	26.8	–1.3
Labour gain from Independent		Swing	▼1.9	

=== Featherstone ===
Featherstone
Party	Candidate	Votes	%	±%
Labour	Maureen Tennant-King*	2,005	72.8	–0.3
Conservative	Anthony Hall	425	15.4	–1.5
Green	Cynthia Dickson	324	11.8	+1.8
Majority		1,580	57.4	+1.2
Turnout		2,754	20.8	–0.8
Labour hold		Swing	▲0.6	

=== Hemsworth ===
Hemsworth
Party	Candidate	Votes	%	±%
Labour	Laura Jones	1,292	61.4	+5.1
Green	Lyn Morton	382	18.2	–12.1
Conservative	Doreen Smart	261	12.4	–1.1
TUSC	Michael Johnson	168	8.0	N/A
Majority		910	43.2	+17.2
Turnout		2,103	17.4	–1.9
Labour hold		Swing	▲8.6	

=== Horbury and South Ossett ===
Horbury and South Ossett
Party	Candidate	Votes	%	±%
Labour	Darren Byford*	2,409	64.9	+14.6
Conservative	Madalena Coutinho	618	16.7	–19.8
Independent	Mark Harrop	304	8.2	N/A
Liberal Democrats	Mark Goodair	223	6.0	–1.9
Green	Richard Norris	157	4.2	–1.2
Majority		1,791	48.2	+34.4
Turnout		3,711	31.6	+0.9
Labour hold		Swing	▲17.2	

=== Knottingley ===
Knottingley
Party	Candidate	Votes	%	±%
Liberal Democrats	Adele Hayes*	1,363	59.5	+0.9
Labour Co-op	Theo Biddle	695	30.3	–0.5
Conservative	Amy Swift	155	6.8	–0.8
Green	Ruth Love	79	3.4	+0.4
Majority		668	29.2	+1.4
Turnout		2,292	21.6	–1.2
Liberal Democrats hold		Swing	▲0.7	

=== Normanton ===
Normanton (2 seats due to by-election)
Party	Candidate	Votes	%	±%
Labour Co-op	Julie Medford*	1,709	71.1	+24.0
Labour Co-op	Daniel Wilton	1,303	54.2	+7.1
Wakefield Ind.	Cliff Parsons	584	24.3	+4.8
Green	John Clayton	426	17.7	+11.2
Conservative	Chad Thomas	406	16.9	–1.6
Conservative	Tomas Mestre	379	15.8	–2.7
Turnout		?	37.0	+16.2
Labour Co-op hold				
Labour Co-op hold				

=== Ossett ===
Ossett
Party	Candidate	Votes	%	±%
Labour	Duncan Smith	1,890	49.9	+4.4
Conservative	Karl Clough	879	23.2	N/A
Reform	Sandra Senior	465	12.3	N/A
Yorkshire	Simon Biltcliffe	216	5.7	–8.7
Liberal Democrats	Tony Sargeant	184	4.9	–9.1
Green	Stephen Scott	153	4.0	–2.2
Majority		1,011	26.7	+1.1
Turnout		3,787	30.1	+3.1
Labour gain from Independent				

=== Pontefract North ===
Pontefract North
Party	Candidate	Votes	%	±%
Labour	Helen Antcliff	1,717	57.0	–5.7
Yorkshire	Chris Dawson	685	22.7	+9.9
Conservative	Jack Crosswaite	418	13.9	–2.0
Green	Emma Tingle	193	6.4	+1.2
Majority		1,032	34.3	–12.5
Turnout		3,013	20.6	+0.1
Labour hold		Swing	▼7.8	

=== Pontefract South ===
Pontefract South
Party	Candidate	Votes	%	±%
Labour	Julie Craig	1,925	57.8	+7.8
Conservative	Tony Hames*	1,102	33.1	–4.4
Green	Oliver Watkins	304	9.1	+4.1
Majority		823	24.7	+12.2
Turnout		3,331	28.1	+0.1
Labour gain from Conservative		Swing	▲6.1	

=== South Elmsall and South Kirkby ===
South Elmsall and South Kirkby
Party	Candidate	Votes	%	±%
Labour	Michelle Collins*	1,893	73.3	–6.5
Conservative	Daniel Wrightson	383	14.8	+4.7
Green	Stefan Ludewig	305	11.8	+1.7
Majority		1,510	58.5	–11.2
Turnout		2,581	18.9	–0.3
Labour hold		Swing	▼5.6	

=== Stanley and Outwood East ===
Stanley and Outwood East
Party	Candidate	Votes	%	±%
Labour	Matthew Morley*	2,432	63.0	+7.2
Conservative	Margaret Woolmer	688	17.8	–2.5
Wakefield Ind.	Jennt Prest	409	10.6	+1.3
Green	Richard Copeland	279	7.2	+1.0
TUSC	Darren Lumber	52	1.3	+0.3
Majority		1,744	45.2	+9.7
Turnout		3,860	28.3	+0.8
Labour hold		Swing	▲4.9	

=== Wakefield East ===
Wakefield East
Party	Candidate	Votes	%	±%
Labour	Natalie Walton	1,754	54.2	+1.7
Green	Janet Mackintosh	857	26.5	+21.2
Conservative	Naeem Formuli	477	14.7	–19.3
TUSC	Michael Griffiths	149	4.6	+2.6
Majority		897	27.7	+9.2
Turnout		3,237	27.4	–2.2
Labour gain from Independent		Swing	▼9.8	

=== Wakefield North ===
Wakefield North
Party	Candidate	Votes	%	±%
Labour	Elizabeth Rhodes*	1,613	50.0	–11.3
Green	Ashton Howick	733	22.7	+15.1
Conservative	Tim Woolmer	460	14.3	–7.4
Yorkshire	Andy Mack	347	10.8	+3.3
TUSC	Tom Griffiths	71	2.2	+0.2
Majority		880	27.3	–12.3
Turnout		3,224	25.9	+1.6
Labour hold		Swing	▼13.2	

=== Wakefield Rural ===
Wakefield Rural
Party	Candidate	Votes	%	±%
Labour	Andy Nicholls	1,710	40.7	+3.2
Conservative	Ian Sanders	1,363	32.4	–4.8
Yorkshire	David Herdson	640	15.2	+3.1
Green	Karen Sadler	319	7.6	+1.7
Liberal Democrats	Mark Lord	169	4.0	–3.4
Majority		347	8.3	+8.0
Turnout		4,201	30.5	+0.6
Labour gain from Conservative		Swing	▲4.0	

=== Wakefield South ===
Wakefield South
Party	Candidate	Votes	%	±%
Labour	Shabaan Saleem	1,326	36.4	–6.2
Conservative	James Hardwick	1,270	34.9	–5.7
Green	Kate Dodd	652	17.9	+9.6
Yorkshire	Daniel Cochran	391	10.7	N/A
Majority		56	1.5	–0.5
Turnout		3,639	33.2	+0.7
Labour gain from Conservative		Swing	▲0.3	

=== Wakefield West ===
Wakefield West
Party	Candidate	Votes	%	±%
Labour	Hilary Mitchell*	1,475	53.1	–10.9
Conservative	John Higson	636	22.9	–0.9
Green	Laura Towle	383	13.8	+8.3
Heritage	Susan Stretton	169	6.1	N/A
Liberal Democrats	Susan Hayes	113	4.1	N/A
Majority		839	30.2	+10.0
Turnout		2,776	24.3	–1.0
Labour hold		Swing	▼5.0	

=== Wrenthorpe and Outwood West ===
Wrenthorpe and Outwood West
Party	Candidate	Votes	%	±%
Labour	Brendan Fraser	1,558	39.6	–0.6
Wakefield Ind.	Nic Stansby	981	24.9	–4.8
Conservative	Waj Ali	462	11.7	–4.6
Reform	David Dews	459	11.7	+7.6
Yorkshire	Brent Hawksley	208	5.3	N/A
Green	Daniel Russell	191	4.9	+0.3
Liberal Democrats	Janet Walton	73	1.9	–3.3
Majority		577	14.7	+4.2
Turnout		3,932	30.2	+1.0
Labour gain from Independent		Swing	▲2.1	

== By-elections ==
=== Featherstone by-election ===
Featherstone: 12 December 2024
Party	Candidate	Votes	%	±%
Labour	Scott Haslam	893	42.1	▼30.7
Liberal Democrats	Chris Howden	548	25.9	N/A
Reform	Waj Ali	463	21.8	N/A
Conservative	Pepe Ruzvidzo	141	6.7	▼8.8
Green	Ali Wood	74	3.5	▼8.3
Majority		345	16.2	−41.2
Turnout		2,121	15.9	−4.9
Labour hold		Swing	▼28.0	
