= 2019 Wakefield Metropolitan District Council election =

2019 UK local government election

2019 local election results in Wakefield

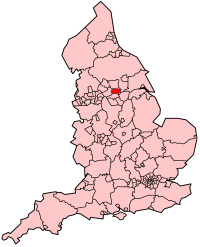
Wakefield Council on UK wide map

The 2019 Wakefield Metropolitan Borough Council election took place on 2 May 2019 to elect members of Wakefield Metropolitan District Council in England. The election was held on the same day as other local elections. The Labour Party and the Conservative Party fielded a full slate of 21 candidates, as well as 14 Liberal Democrats, 8 Yorkshire Party candidates, 7 UK Independence Party candidates, 6 Green Party candidates, 6 Independent candidates, 1 Socialist Alternative candidate and 1 Democrats and Veteran's Party candidate.

== Council make-up ==
The make up of the Council following the election was:

Party political make-up of Wakefield Council
Party	Seats				Current Council (2019)
Party	2015	2016 (Note: The UK Independence Party also won 2 seats.)	2018	2019	Current Council (2019)
Labour	53	53	52	49	
Conservative	6	7	11	11	
Independent	2	1	0	2	
Lib Dems	0	0	0	1	

== Summary ==
Wakefield local election result 2019
Party	Seats	Gains	Losses	Net gain/loss	Seats %	Votes %	Votes	+/−
Labour	13	0	3	-3	62	42.5	28,750	-9.2
Conservative	5	0	0	0	24	24.6	16,669	-9.4
Independent	2	2	0	+2	10	6.2	4,179	+2.3
Liberal Democrats	1	1	0	+1	5	9.0	6,119	+4.1
UKIP	0	0	0	0	0	7.4	4,992	+6.3
Yorkshire	0	0	0	0	0	6.9	4,686	+3.9
Green	0	0	0	0	0	2.9	1,987	+1.8
Democrats and Veterans	0	0	0	0	0	0.3	219	+0.1
Socialist Alternative	0	0	0	0	0	0.1	87	-0.1

- +/- compared with Wakefield Council election 2018.

== Ward results ==
=== Ackworth, North Elmsall and Upton ward ===
Ackworth, North Elmsall and Upton
Party	Candidate	Votes	%	±%
Labour	Jessica Carrington	1,224	34.8	−7.5
Yorkshire	Martin Roberts	670	19.0	+10.2
Conservative	Philip Davies	642	18.3	−6.7
Independent	John Hardman	412	11.7	+11.7
Liberal Democrats	Nick Gray	293	8.3	+4.7
Independent	Gwen Marshall	276	7.8	−6.3
Majority		554	17.3	−1.5
Turnout		3520	27.3	+2.0
Rejected ballots		118		
Labour hold		Swing		

=== Airedale and Ferry Fryston ward ===
Around a year after his election, Alex Kear was jailed after arranging to meet with a three-year-old girl for sexual abuse.

Airedale and Ferry Fryston
Party	Candidate	Votes	%	±%
Independent	Alex Kear	1,166	45.2	+45.2
Labour	Yvonne Crewe	1091	42.3	−31.0
Conservative	Eamonn Mullins	321	12.5	−11.3
Majority		75	2.9	−49.5
Turnout		2578	22.4	+3.5
Rejected ballots		31		
Independent gain from Labour		Swing		

=== Altofts and Whitwood ward ===
Altofts and Whitwood
Party	Candidate	Votes	%	±%
Labour	Jo Hepworth	1,318	39.4	−18.1
Yorkshire	Laura Walker	1089	32.5	+22.4
Conservative	Anthony Hill	562	16.8	−11.2
Democrats and Veterans	John Thomas	219	6.5	+2.1
Liberal Democrats	Malcolm Pollack	159	4.8	+4.8
Majority		229	6.9	−22.6
Turnout		3347	24.8	+0.9
Rejected ballots		35		
Labour hold		Swing		

=== Castleford Central and Glasshoughton ward ===
Castleford Central and Glasshoughton
Party	Candidate	Votes	%	±%
Labour	Tony Wallis	1,316	42.7	−18.2
UKIP	Lawrence Burrows	828	26.9	+26.9
Yorkshire	Paul Phelps	689	22.4	−2.8
Conservative	Joanne Smart	249	8.1	−5.8
Majority		488	15.8	−19.9
Turnout		3082	25.3	+2.9
Rejected ballots		13		
Labour hold		Swing		

=== Crofton, Ryhill and Walton ward ===
Crofton, Ryhill and Walton
Party	Candidate	Votes	%	±%
Labour	Maureen Cummings	1,645	49.1	−5.0
Conservative	James Hardwick	1082	32.3	−2.7
Liberal Democrats	Adam Belcher	621	18.5	+7.6
Majority		563	16.8	−2.3
Turnout		3348	27.6	−2.1
Labour hold		Swing		

=== Featherstone ward ===
Featherstone
Party	Candidate	Votes	%	±%
Labour	Graham Isherwood	1,794	71.0	−4.8
Conservative	Rodney Williams	733	29.0	+4.8
Majority		1061	42.0	−9.6
Turnout		2527	19.4	−3.3
Rejected ballots		157		
Labour hold		Swing		

=== Hemsworth ward ===
Hemsworth
Party	Candidate	Votes	%	±%
Independent	Ian Womersley	1,459	49.6	+13.0
Labour	Glyn Lloyd	1104	37.5	−17.2
Conservative	Nathaniel Harvey	194	6.6	−2.1
Green	Lyn Morton	184	6.3	+6.3
Majority		355	12.1	−6.0
Turnout		2941	24.7	+1.4
Rejected ballots		31		
Independent gain from Labour		Swing		

=== Horbury and South Ossett ward ===
Horbury and South Ossett
Party	Candidate	Votes	%	±%
Conservative	Simon Fishwick	1,478	39.2	−5.5
Labour	Melanie Jones	1240	32.8	−6.7
Liberal Democrats	Mark Goodair	413	10.9	+0.1
Independent	Mark Harrop	327	8.7	+8.7
Green	Richard Norris	317	8.4	+3.4
Majority		238	6.4	+1.2
Turnout		3775	32.2	−1.4
Rejected ballots		43		
Conservative hold		Swing		

=== Knottingley ward ===
Knottingley
Party	Candidate	Votes	%	±%
Liberal Democrats	Thomas Gordon	1,906	63.1	+63.1
Labour	Glenn Burton	642	21.3	−45.3
Green	Willow Tolley	237	7.8	+7.8
Conservative	Joshua Spencer	235	7.8	−25.6
Majority		1264	41.8	−5.1
Turnout		3020	29.4	+8.7
Rejected ballots		52		
Liberal Democrats gain from Labour		Swing		

=== Normanton ward ===
Normanton
Party	Candidate	Votes	%	±%
Labour	David Dagger	1,322	45.6	−25.2
UKIP	Cliff Parsons	1174	40.5	+40.5
Conservative	Luke Thomas	405	14.0	−15.2
Majority		148	5.1	−36.5
Turnout		2901	23.4	+3.1
Rejected ballots		37		
Labour hold		Swing		

=== Ossett ward ===
Ossett
Party	Candidate	Votes	%	±%
Conservative	Angela Taylor	1,551	42.6	−8.4
Labour	Duncan Smith	1427	39.2	+2.2
Green	Stephen Scott	405	11.1	+11.1
Liberal Democrats	Tony Sargeant	261	7.2	−4.8
Majority		124	3.4	−10.6
Turnout		3644	29.4	−3.8
Rejected ballots		88		
Conservative hold		Swing		

=== Pontefract North ward ===
Pontefract North
Party	Candidate	Votes	%	±%
Labour	Patricia Garbutt	1,214	41.4	−18.8
Yorkshire	Steven Crookes	1148	39.2	+29.9
Conservative	Chris Hyomes	570	19.4	−5.5
Majority		66	2.2	−20.3
Turnout		2932	22.1	−0.4
Rejected ballots		54		
Labour hold		Swing		

=== Pontefract South ===
Pontefract South
Party	Candidate	Votes	%	±%
Labour	David Jones	1,560	46.4	−5.8
Conservative	Tony Hames	1351	40.2	−2.7
Liberal Democrats	Salli Martlew	450	13.4	+8.5
Majority		209	6.2	−3.1
Turnout		3361	28.3	−3.6
Rejected ballots		160		
Labour hold		Swing		

=== South Elmsall and South Kirkby ward ===
South Elmsall and South Kirkby
Party	Candidate	Votes	%	±%
Labour	Stephen Tulley	2,120	75.6	+20.5
Liberal Democrats	Michael Keeton	383	13.6	+13.6
Conservative	Pepe Ruzvidzo	303	10.8	+2.4
Majority		1737	62.0	+33.4
Turnout		2806	20.5	−2.0
Rejected ballots		135		
Labour hold		Swing		

=== Stanley and Outwood East ward ===
Stanley and Outwood East
Party	Candidate	Votes	%	±%
Labour	Jack Hemingway	1,567	44.8	−3.9
Conservative	Gillian Laidler	859	24.5	−10.7
UKIP	James Johnston	770	22.0	+16.0
Liberal Democrats	Mary Macqueen	304	8.7	−1.4
Majority		708	20.3	+6.8
Turnout		3500	27.8	+0.0
Rejected ballots		40		
Labour hold		Swing		

=== Wakefield East ward ===
Wakefield East
Party	Candidate	Votes	%	±%
Labour	Stuart Heptinstall	1,725	56.9	−8.0
UKIP	Colin Thornton	386	12.7	+12.7
Conservative	Dianne Presha	370	12.2	−7.9
Green	Terence Emmingham	270	8.9	+2.7
Yorkshire	Stuart Rick	194	6.4	+6.4
Socialist Alternative	Michael Griffiths	87	2.9	−1.7
Majority		1339	44.2	−0.6
Turnout		3032	26.7	+0.7
Rejected ballots		13		
Labour hold		Swing		

=== Wakefield North ward ===
Wakefield North
Party	Candidate	Votes	%	±%
Labour	Margaret Isherwood	1,377	46.0	−8.2
Conservative	Angela Holwell	583	19.5	−9.6
UKIP	Keith Wells	517	17.3	+11.9
Yorkshire	Arnie Craven	302	10.1	+2.8
Liberal Democrats	Natasha De Vere	214	7.0	+3.2
Majority		794	26.5	+1.4
Turnout		2993	25.5	−0.8
Rejected ballots		24		
Labour hold		Swing		

=== Wakefield Rural ward ===
Wakefield Rural
Party	Candidate	Votes	%	±%
Conservative	Ian Sanders	1,796	44.4	−9.9
Labour	Kevin Barker	1335	33.0	−3.8
Green	Sarah Greenwood	574	14.2	+14.2
Liberal Democrats	Catherine Budgen	343	8.5	−0.4
Majority		461	11.4	−6.1
Turnout		4048	29.6	−5.5
Rejected ballots		107		
Conservative hold		Swing		

=== Wakefield South ward ===
Wakefield South
Party	Candidate	Votes	%	±%
Conservative	Karl Johnson	1,532	40.8	−15.9
Labour	Pete Rosser	1060	28.2	−3.9
Independent	Norman Hazell	539	14.4	+14.4
Yorkshire	Daniel Cochran	320	8.5	+2.5
Liberal Democrats	David Currie	303	8.1	+2.8
Majority		472	12.6	−12.0
Turnout		3754	36.0	−1.0
Rejected ballots		34		
Conservative hold		Swing		

=== Wakefield West ward ===
Wakefield West
Party	Candidate	Votes	%	±%
Labour	Michael Graham	1,429	48.3	−3.3
UKIP	Josie Thornton	678	22.9	+22.9
Conservative	Tony Ayoade	655	22.1	−19.2
Liberal Democrats	John Clayton	198	6.7	−0.4
Majority		751	25.4	+15.1
Turnout		2960	26.9	+0.8
Rejected ballots		27		
Labour hold		Swing		

=== Wrenthorpe and Outwood West ward ===
Wrenthorpe and Outwood West
Party	Candidate	Votes	%	±%
Labour	Charlie Keith	1,240	34.2	−5.6
Conservative	Henry Drabble	1198	33.1	−10.9
UKIP	David Dews	639	17.6	+7.4
Yorkshire	Brent Hawksley	274	7.6	+7.6
Liberal Democrats	Esther Amis-Hughes	271	7.5	+1.6
Majority		42	1.1	−3.1
Turnout		3622	28.9	−2.5
Rejected ballots		10		
Labour hold		Swing		
