= 2016 Wakefield Metropolitan District Council election =

2016 UK local government election

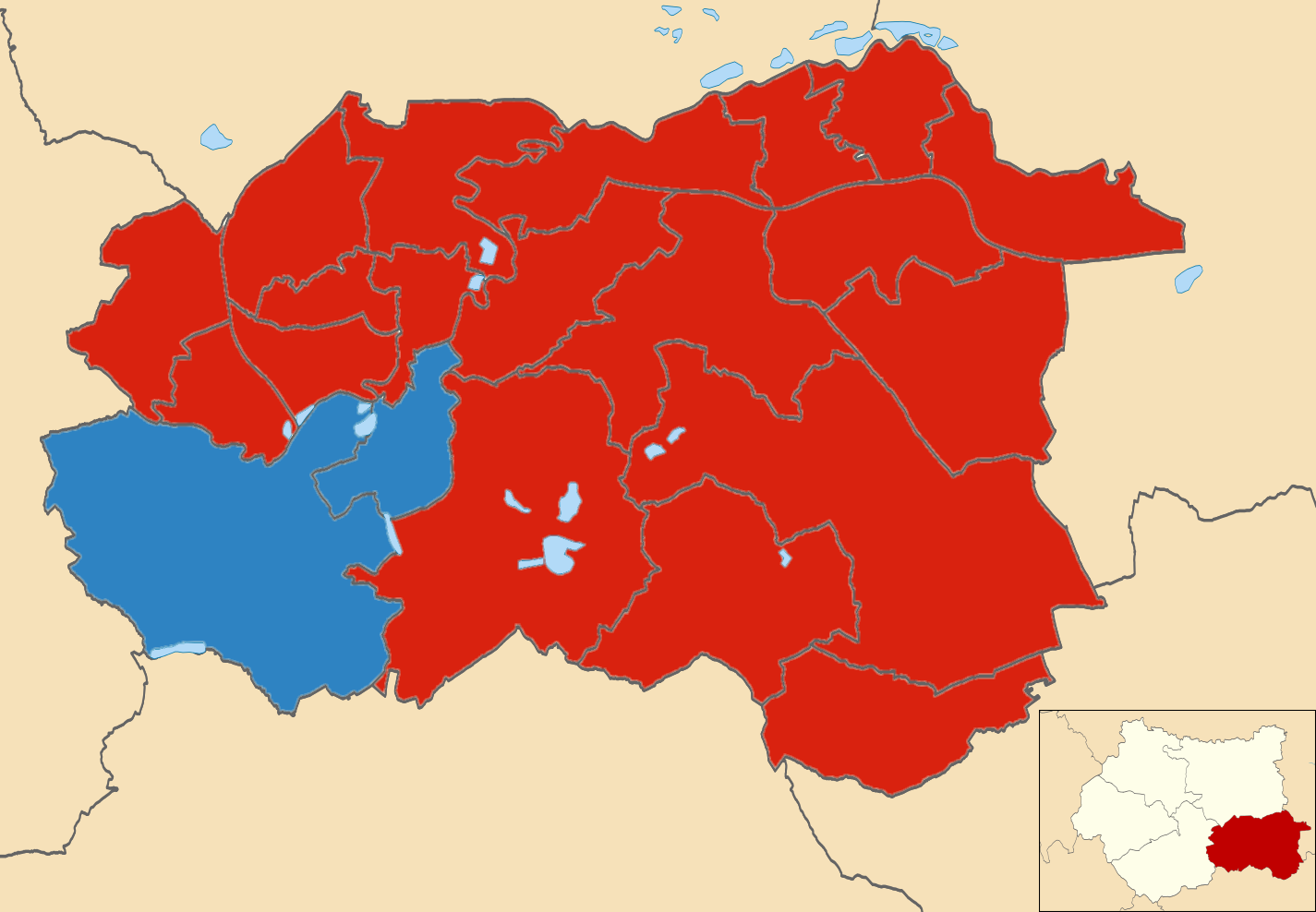
2016 local election results in Wakefield

The 2016 Wakefield Metropolitan Borough Council election took place on 5 May 2016 to elect members of Wakefield Metropolitan District Council in England. This was on the same day as other local elections. The Labour Party and the Conservative Party fielded a full slate of 21 candidates, with UK Independence Party putting forward 11 candidates, 9 Liberal Democrat candidates, 6 Trade Union and Socialist Coalition candidates, 5 Yorkshire First candidates, 3 Green Party candidates and 4 Independent candidates.

== Council Make-up ==
The make up of the Council following the election was:

Party political make-up of Wakefield Council
Party	Seats			Current Council (2014)
Party	2014	2015	2016	Current Council (2014)
Labour	54	53	53	
Conservative	6	6	7	
UKIP	2	2	2	
Independent	1	2	1	

== Summary ==
Wakefield local election result 2016
Party	Seats	Gains	Losses	Net gain/loss	Seats %	Votes %	Votes	+/−
Labour	19	1	1	0	90.0	53.4	39,305	+4.4
Conservative	2	1	0	+1	10.0	23.3	17,171	-3.2
UKIP	0	0	0	0	0.0	11.5	8478	-6.4
Independent	0	0	1	-1	0.0	3.9	2901	+3.5
Liberal Democrats	0	0	0	0	0.0	3.5	2577	+1.5
Yorkshire	0	0	0	0	0.0	1.7	1270	+1.3
TUSC	0	0	0	0	0.0	1.4	1044	+0.3
Green	0	0	0	0	0.0	1.1	855	-1.5

- +/- compared with Wakefield Council election 2015.

== Ward results ==
=== Ackworth, North Elmsall and Upton ward ===
Ackworth, North Elmsall and Upton
Party	Candidate	Votes	%	±%
Labour	Martyn Ward	1631	45.7	0.0
Conservative	Don Marshall	776	20.5	−7.7
UKIP	Nathan Garbutt	639	16.9	−4.1
Independent	Steven Pallett	500	13.2	N/A
Yorkshire First	Martin Roberts	234	6.2	−0.4%
Majority		855	22.6	+4.6
Turnout		3780	30.6	−27.9
Labour hold		Swing		

=== Airedale and Ferry Fryston ward ===
Airedale and Ferry Fryston
Party	Candidate	Votes	%	±%
Labour	Les Shaw	2142	82.1	+12
Conservative	Amy Swift	467	17.9	+0.0
Majority		1675	52.2	+12
Turnout		2609	23.5	−26.6
Labour hold		Swing		

=== Altofts and Whitwood ward ===
Altofts and Whitwood
Party	Candidate	Votes	%	±%
Labour	Peter Box	1994	58.5	+3.5
Conservative	Anthony Hill	668	19.6	−2.4
Independent	Matthew Jeans	384	11.3	N/A
Yorkshire First	Steve Crookes	363	10.6	N/A
Majority		1326	38.9	+6.4
Turnout		3409	27.4	−30.0
Labour hold		Swing		

=== Castleford Central and Glasshoughton ward ===
Castleford Central and Glasshoughton
Party	Candidate	Votes	%	±%
Labour	Richard Forster	2133	69.0	+6.3
UKIP	Dawn Lumb	718	23.2	−1.6
Conservative	Joanne Smart	241	7.8	−4.7
Majority		1415	45.8	+7.9
Turnout		3092	27.0	−25.4
Labour hold		Swing		

=== Crofton, Ryhill and Walton ward ===
Crofton, Ryhill and Walton
Party	Candidate	Votes	%	±%
Labour	Faith Heptinstall	1968	48.8	+1.2
UKIP	Steve Ashton	1003	24.9	−2.8
Conservative	Tony Ayoade	812	20.1	−4.7
Liberal Democrats	Adam Belcher	252	6.2	N/A
Majority		965	23.9	+4.0
Turnout		4035	34.4	−28.2
Labour hold		Swing		

=== Featherstone ward ===
Featherstone
Party	Candidate	Votes	%	±%
Labour	Maureen Tennant-King	2778	82.0	+22.8
Conservative	Rodney Williams	611	18.0	+4.5
Majority		2167	64.0	+26.6
Turnout		3389	27.6	−26.1
Labour hold		Swing		

=== Hemsworth ward ===
Hemsworth
Party	Candidate	Votes	%	±%
Labour	Pauline Kitching	1391	44.9	−25.6
Independent	Ian Womersley	1104	35.6	N/A
UKIP	Penny Ashton	413	13.3	−11.7
Conservative	John Martin	190	6.1	−7.3
Majority		287	9.3	−27.2
Turnout		3098	27.2	−25.1
Labour hold		Swing		

=== Horbury and South Ossett ward ===
Horbury and South Ossett
Party	Candidate	Votes	%	±%
Labour	Darren Byford	1611	39	+6.2
UKIP	Neil Coleman	890	21.5	+1
Conservative	Madalena Mestre	883	21.4	−12
Liberal Democrats	Mark Goodair	531	12.9	+4.3
Green	Richard Norris	216	5.2	+1.3
Majority		721	17.5	+16.9
Turnout		4131	35.9	−27.4
Labour hold		Swing		

=== Knottingley ward ===
Knottingley
Party	Candidate	Votes	%	±%
Labour	Graham Stokes	1597	61.5	−15.0
UKIP	Lewis Thompson	724	27.9	N/A
Conservative	Eamonn Mullins	277	10.7	−12.8
Majority		873	33.6	−19.4
Turnout		2598	26.4	−24.3
Labour hold		Swing		

=== Normanton ward ===
Normanton
Party	Candidate	Votes	%	±%
Labour	Alan Wassell	2147	54.4	+20.9
Conservative	Matthew Gilligan	706	24.7	+5.7
Majority		1441	50.6	+22.8
Turnout		2853	23.9	−28.2
Labour hold		Swing		

=== Ossett ward ===
Ossett
Party	Candidate	Votes	%	±%
Labour	Lynn Masterman	1168	27.4	−0.9
UKIP	Jonathon Cook	1017	23.8	−1.3
Independent	Tony Richardson	913	21.4	N/A
Conservative	Terry Brown	880	20.6	−16
Liberal Democrats	Tony Sargeant	290	6.8	+1.2
Majority		151	3.6	−4.7
Turnout		4268	34.9	−28.3
Labour gain from Independent		Swing		

=== Pontefract North ward ===
Pontefract North
Party	Candidate	Votes	%	±%
Labour	Lorna Malkin	1601	53.3	
UKIP	Joshua Spencer	762	25.4	
Conservative	Chris Hyomes	470	15.7	
Yorkshire First	Arnie Craven	168	5.6	
Majority		839	27.9	
Turnout		3001	26.1	
Labour hold		Swing		

=== Pontefract South ===
Pontefract South
Party	Candidate	Votes	%	±%
Labour	Celia Loughran	1917	47.2	−1.9
Conservative	Geoff Walsh	1669	41.1	−2.7
TUSC	John Gill	271	6.7	−0.4
Liberal Democrats	Daniel Woodlock	203	5.0	N/A
Majority		248	6.1	+0.8
Turnout		4060	35.3	−25.8
Labour hold		Swing		

=== South Elmsall and South Kirkby ward ===
South Elmsall and South Kirkby
Party	Candidate	Votes	%	±%
Labour	Michelle Collins	2802	83.9	+15.6
Conservative	Chris I'Anson	536	16.1	+7.7
Majority		2266	67.8	+22.8
Turnout		3338	26.1	−27.1
Labour hold		Swing		

=== Stanley and Outwood East ward ===
Stanley and Outwood East
Party	Candidate	Votes	%	±%
Labour	Matthew Morley	1873	48.6	+6.3
Conservative	Gill Laidler	950	24.6	−5.2
UKIP	James Johnston	831	21.5	+0.6
Liberal Democrats	Margaret Dodd	151	3.9	−1.5
TUSC	Dave Byrom	52	1.3	−0.3
Majority		923	24.0	+11.5
Turnout		3857	32.0	−30.7
Labour hold		Swing		

=== Wakefield East ward ===
Wakefield East
Party	Candidate	Votes	%	±%
Labour	Rosaline Lund	2225	66.8	+6.3
Conservative	Richard Wakefield	550	16.5	−6.2
Green	Jody Gabriel	315	9.5	+1.1
TUSC	Mick Griffiths	243	7.3	+2.2
Majority		1675	50.3	+12.5
Turnout		3333	30.8	−20.9
Labour hold		Swing		

=== Wakefield North ward ===
Wakefield North
Party	Candidate	Votes	%	±%
Labour	Elizabeth Rhodes	1781	55.2	+12.6
UKIP	Keith Wells	636	19.7	−1.4
Conservative	Allan Couch	564	17.5	−6.4
Yorkshire First	Lucy Brown	246	7.6	+5.0
Majority		1171	35.5	+16.8
Turnout		3227	30.5	−24.9
Labour hold		Swing		

=== Wakefield Rural ward ===
Wakefield Rural
Party	Candidate	Votes	%	±%
Conservative	Cynthia Binns	1978	43.8	+5.5
Labour	Jayne Wilby	1744	38.6	+9.0
Liberal Democrats	Finbarr Cronin	546	12.1	+5.4
TUSC	Sam Lynch	246	5.4	+4.4
Majority		234	5.2	−3.5
Turnout		4514	34.2	−30.1
Conservative gain from Labour		Swing		

=== Wakefield South ward ===
Wakefield South
Party	Candidate	Votes	%	±%
Conservative	Richard Hunt	1643	45.1	−8.2
Labour	Ian Bain	1408	38.6	+7.0
Yorkshire First	Daniel Cochran	259	7.1	N/A
Liberal Democrats	David Currie	248	6.8	+0.9
TUSC	John Sibbald	89	2.4	+0.5
Majority		235	6.5	−15.2
Turnout		3647	36.2	−26.6
Conservative hold		Swing		

=== Wakefield West ward ===
Wakefield West
Party	Candidate	Votes	%	±%
Labour	Hilary Mitchell	1563	49.0	+6.5
Conservative	Dianne Presha	962	30.2	+1.3
Green	Brian Else	324	10.2	+5.2
Liberal Democrats	Peter Williams	196	6.1	N/A
TUSC	Neil Taylor	143	4.5	+3.3
Majority		601	18.8	+5.2
Turnout		3188	30.2	−22.3
Labour hold		Swing		

=== Wrenthorpe and Outwood West ward ===
Wrenthorpe and Outwood West
Party	Candidate	Votes	%	±%
Labour	Martyn Johnson	1831	43.9	+4.2
Conservative	Sam Harvey	1338	32.1	−0.3
UKIP	Ian Sheldrake	845	20.2	−1.9
Liberal Democrats	Natasha De Vere	160	3.8	−2.0
Majority		493	11.8	+4.5
Turnout		4174	36.4	−28.0
Labour hold		Swing		
