= 2015 Wakefield Metropolitan District Council election =

2015 UK local government election

2015 local election results in Wakefield

The 2015 Wakefield Metropolitan District Council election took place on 7 May 2015 to elect members of Wakefield Metropolitan District Council in England. This was on the same day as other local elections. The Labour Party and Conservatives fielded a full slate of 21 candidates, with UKIP putting forward 17 candidates. There were 9 Green candidates, 9 TUSC candidates and 6 Liberal Democrat candidates. Also standing were 2 Yorkshire First representatives, and one Independent.

== Council Make-up ==
The make up of the Council following the election was:

Party political make-up of Wakefield Council
Party	Seats			Current Council (2014)
Party	2012	2014	2015	Current Council (2014)
Labour	52	54	53	
Conservative	11	6	6	
UKIP	0	2	2	
Independent	0	1	2	

== Summary ==
Wakefield local election result 2015
Party	Seats	Gains	Losses	Net gain/loss	Seats %	Votes %	Votes	+/−
Labour	17	1	1	0	81.0	49.0	71,701	+1.4
Conservative	4	1	1	0	19.0	26.5	38,812	+4.6
UKIP	0	0	0	0	0.0	17.9	26,218	-4.4
Green	0	0	0	0	0.0	2.6	3,744	+1.1
Liberal Democrats	0	0	0	0	0.0	2.0	2,973	-0.7
TUSC	0	0	0	0	0.0	1.1	1,627	-0.7
Yorkshire	0	0	0	0	0.0	0.4	653	+0.4
Independent	0	0	0	0	0.0	0.4	580	-2.0

- +/- compared with Wakefield Council election 2014.

== Ward results ==
=== Ackworth, North Elmsall and Upton ward ===
Ackworth, North Elmsall and Upton
Party	Candidate	Votes	%	±%
Labour	Jessica Carrington	3437	45.7	+2.5
Conservative	Don Marshall	2081	27.7	+5.5
UKIP	Mick Tetlow	1507	20.0	−14.6
Yorkshire First	Martin Roberts	493	6.6	N/A
Majority		1356	18.0	+9.4
Turnout		7518	58.5	+28.3
Labour hold		Swing		

=== Airedale and Ferry Fryston ward ===
Airedale and Ferry Fryston
Party	Candidate	Votes	%	±%
Labour	Yvonne Crewe	4103	70.1	+15.7
Conservative	Amy Swift	1047	17.9	+8.8
Green	Simon Addy	706	12.1	N/A
Majority		3056	52.2	+34.3
Turnout		5856	50.1	+25.1
Labour hold		Swing		

=== Altofts and Whitwood ward ===
Altofts and Whitwood
Party	Candidate	Votes	%	±%
Labour	Jo Hepworth	4168	55.3	+5.9
UKIP	Geoffrey Johnston	1715	22.8	−13.8
Conservative	Anthony Hill	1655	22.0	+7.9
Majority		2453	32.5	+19.7
Turnout		7538	57.4	+29.7
Labour hold		Swing		

=== Castleford Central and Glasshoughton ward ===
Castleford Central and Glasshoughton
Party	Candidate	Votes	%	±%
Labour	Tony Wallis	4015	62.7	+7.8
UKIP	Dawn Lumb	1590	24.8	−12.6
Conservative	Eamonn Mullins	798	12.5	+4.8
Majority		2425	37.9	+20.4
Turnout		6403	52.4	+25.6
Labour hold		Swing		

=== Crofton, Ryhill and Walton ward ===
Crofton, Ryhill and Walton
Party	Candidate	Votes	%	±%
Labour	Maureen Cummings	3625	47.6	+8.2
UKIP	Steve Ashton	2109	27.7	−7.7%
Conservative	Madalena Mestre	1886	24.8	+5.0
Majority		1516	19.9	+15.9
Turnout		7620	62.6	+28.5
Labour hold		Swing		

=== Featherstone ward ===
Featherstone
Party	Candidate	Votes	%	±%
Labour	Graham Isherwood	4111	59.2	−21.4
UKIP	David Sea-Borne	1512	21.8	N/A
Conservative	Rodney Williams	934	13.5	−5.9
Independent	Karen Palmer	382	5.5	N/A
Majority		2599	37.4	−23.8
Turnout		6939	53.7	+27.7
Labour hold		Swing		

=== Hemsworth ward ===
Hemsworth
Party	Candidate	Votes	%	±%
Labour	Glyn Lloyd	3856	61.5	+7.6
UKIP	Penny Ashton	1568	25.0	−11.6
Conservative	Philip Davies	842	13.4	+3.9
Majority		2288	36.5	+19.2
Turnout		6266	52.3	+26.2
Labour hold		Swing		

=== Horbury and South Ossett ward ===
Horbury and South Ossett
Party	Candidate	Votes	%	±%
Conservative	Margaret Holwell	2557	33.4	+12.2
Labour	Rory Bickerton	2512	32.8	−8.5
UKIP	Bob Dixon	1570	20.5	−10.0
Liberal Democrats	Mark Goodair	660	8.6	+3.2
Green	Richard Norris	299	3.9	N/A
TUSC	John Vasey	65	0.8	−0.7
Majority		45	0.6	−10.2
Turnout		7663	63.3	+30.6
Conservative gain from Labour		Swing		

=== Knottingley ward ===
Knottingley
Party	Candidate	Votes	%	±%
Labour	Glen Burton	4070	76.5	−1.4
Conservative	Rebecca Norris	1253	23.5	+1.4
Majority		2817	53.0	−2.8
Turnout		5323	50.7	+26.5
Labour hold		Swing		

=== Normanton ward ===
Normanton
Party	Candidate	Votes	%	±%
Labour	David Dagger	3585	54.4	−20.2
UKIP	Colin Wroe	1752	26.6	N/A
Conservative	Jean Molloy	1251	19.0	−6.4
Majority		1833	27.8	−21.4
Turnout		6588	52.1	+28.5
Labour hold		Swing		

=== Ossett ward ===
Ossett
Party	Candidate	Votes	%	±%
Conservative	Angela Taylor	2977	36.6	+9.0
Labour	Don Hitchen	2302	28.3	−2.4
UKIP	Jonathan Cook	2058	25.3	−8.2
Liberal Democrats	Tony Sargeant	457	5.6	−1.3
Green	Lesley Kimber	342	4.2	N/A
Majority		675	8.3	+5.5
Turnout		8136	63.2	+29.5
Conservative hold		Swing		

=== Pontefract North ward ===
Pontefract North
Party	Candidate	Votes	%	±%
Labour	Pat Garbutt	3398	51.7	+3.1
UKIP	Nathan Garbutt	1422	21.6	−14.0
Conservative	Chris Speight	1375	20.9	+7.2
Green	Rennie Smith	286	4.3	N/A
TUSC	Daniel Dearden	97	1.5	−0.6
Majority		1976	30.1	+17.1
Turnout		6578	54.0	+25.7
Labour hold		Swing		

=== Pontefract South ===
Pontefract South
Party	Candidate	Votes	%	±%
Labour	David Jones	3577	49.1	+7.3
Conservative	Geoff Walsh	3196	43.8	+9.9
TUSC	John Gill	518	7.1	+5.5
Majority		381	5.3	−2.6
Turnout		7291	61.1	+25.6
Labour hold		Swing		

=== South Elmsall and South Kirkby ward ===
South Elmsall and South Kirkby
Party	Candidate	Votes	%	±%
Labour	Steve Tulley	4889	68.3	+26.7
UKIP	Jim Kenyon	1672	23.3	N/A
Conservative	Charles Scholes	601	8.4	+1.0
Majority		3217	45.0	+35.6
Turnout		7162	53.2	+26.4
Labour hold		Swing		

=== Stanley and Outwood East ward ===
Stanley and Outwood East
Party	Candidate	Votes	%	±%
Labour	Clive Hudson	3351	42.3	−10.0
Conservative	Rachel Malyk	2358	29.8	−1.7
UKIP	James Johnston	1651	20.9	N/A
Liberal Democrats	Margaret Dodd	427	5.4	−2.4
TUSC	Dave Byrom	129	1.6	−6.8
Majority		993	12.5	−8.3
Turnout		7916	62.7	+31.7
Labour hold		Swing		

=== Wakefield East ward ===
Wakefield East
Party	Candidate	Votes	%	±%
Labour	Stuart Heptinstall	3714	60.5	+8.3
Conservative	Richard Wakefield	1396	22.7	+7.0
Green	Jody Gabriel	518	8.4	N/A
TUSC	Mick Griffiths	313	5.1	+1.5
Independent	Steve Gilks	198	3.2	N/A
Majority		2318	37.8	+14.1
Turnout		6139	51.7	+21.3
Labour hold		Swing		

=== Wakefield North ward ===
Wakefield North
Party	Candidate	Votes	%	±%
Labour	Margaret Isherwood	2666	42.6	−1.4
Conservative	Annemarie Glover	1495	23.9	+7.3
UKIP	Keith Wells	1319	21.1	−8.9
Green	Stuart Boothman	395	6.3	N/A
TUSC	Adrian O'Malley	216	3.5	−0.6
Yorkshire First	Lucy Brown	161	2.6	N/A
Majority		1171	18.7	+4.7
Turnout		6252	55.4	+24.9
Labour hold		Swing		

=== Wakefield Rural ward ===
Wakefield Rural
Party	Candidate	Votes	%	±%
Conservative	Ian Sanders	3318	38.3	+0.9
Labour	Jayne Wilby	2614	29.6	−9.5
UKIP	Ruth Sheard	1743	19.8	N/A
Liberal Democrats	Finbarr Cronin	590	6.7	+0.3
Green	Miriam Hawkins	405	4.6	−8.9
TUSC	Sam Lynch	91	1.0	−2.7
Majority		767	8.7	+7.0
Turnout		8824	64.3	+31.8
Conservative hold		Swing		

=== Wakefield South ward ===
Wakefield South
Party	Candidate	Votes	%	±%
Conservative	Monica Graham	3577	53.3	+13.6
Labour	Darren Byford	2121	31.6	+11.7
Green	Mark Pedlar	495	7.4	N/A
Liberal Democrats	David Currie	395	5.9	+1.0
TUSC	John Sibbald	129	1.9	+0.5
Majority		1456	21.7	+11.9
Turnout		6717	62.8	+23.6
Conservative hold		Swing		

=== Wakefield West ward ===
Wakefield West
Party	Candidate	Votes	%	±%
Labour	Ryan Case	2521	42.5	−3.8
Conservative	Richard Hunt	1714	28.9	+1.7
UKIP	Ian Johnston	1324	22.3	N/A
Green	Brian Else	298	5.0	−10.5
TUSC	Neil Taylor	69	1.2	−4.6
Majority		807	13.6	−5.5
Turnout		5926	52.5	+23.4
Labour gain from Conservative		Swing		

=== Wrenthorpe and Outwood West ward ===
Wrenthorpe and Outwood West
Party	Candidate	Votes	%	±%
Labour	Charlie Keith	3066	39.7	+6.6
Conservative	Dean Ryan	2501	32.4	+9.1
UKIP	Brian Moorhouse	1706	22.1	−16.5
Liberal Democrats	David Arthur	444	5.8	+0.9
Majority		565	7.3	+1.8
Turnout		7717	64.4	+30.3
Labour hold		Swing		
