= 2006 Wakefield Metropolitan District Council election =

2006 UK local government election

2006 local election results in Wakefield

The 2006 Wakefield Metropolitan District Council election took place on 4 May 2006 to elect members of Wakefield Metropolitan District Council in West Yorkshire, England. One third of the council was up for election and the Labour party kept overall control of the council.

After the election, the composition of the council was

- Labour 41
- Conservative 14
- Independent 5
- Liberal Democrat 3

== Campaign ==
Before the election Labour had 44 seats, the Conservatives 10, independents 6 and the Liberal Democrats 3 seats. 75 candidates stood in the election for the 21 seats that were being contested, with Labour very unlikely to lose control of the council, which was the only council in West Yorkshire they still had a majority on.

== Election result ==
The results saw the Conservatives gain 4 seats, 3 from Labour and 1 from an independent. Labour were defeated in Horbury and South Ossett, Pontefract South and Wrenthorpe and Outwood West wards, with the losses blamed by the Labour leader on national issues. The other Conservative gain came in Wakefield South where they defeated independent councillor Norman Hazell by 17 votes. Hazell was a former Conservative member who had left the party in 2001 to sit as an independent councillor. However the other independent member managed to hold his seat in Featherstone despite a strong challenge from Labour.

Wakefield local election result 2006
Party	Seats	Gains	Losses	Net gain/loss	Seats %	Votes %	Votes	+/−
Labour	13	0	3	-3	61.9	41.7	32,765	-4.0%
Conservative	6	4	0	+4	28.6	29.1	22,832	-0.7%
Liberal Democrats	1	0	0	0	4.8	9.4	7,375	+1.1%
Independent	1	0	1	-1	4.8	7.6	5,962	-2.3%
BNP	0	0	0	0	0	10.7	8,426	+6.7%
Green	0	0	0	0	0	1.1	861	+0.6%
Socialist Alternative	0	0	0	0	0	0.3	231	-0.3%
UKIP	0	0	0	0	0	0.2	128	-0.9%

== Ward results ==
Ackworth, North Elmsall and Upton
Party	Candidate	Votes	%	±%
Labour	Sarah Balfour	1,707	41.6	
Conservative	Andrew Crowther	1,285	31.3	
Independent	John Evans	566	13.8	
Liberal Democrats	Oliver Wadsworth	543	13.2	
Majority		422	10.3	
Turnout		4,101		
Labour hold		Swing		

Airedale and Ferry Fryston
Party	Candidate	Votes	%	±%
Labour	Linda Broom	1,655	58.0	
BNP	Stephen Rogerson	709	24.9	
Conservative	Eamonn Mullins	489	17.1	
Majority		946	33.1	
Turnout		2,853		
Labour hold		Swing		

Altofts and Whitwood
Party	Candidate	Votes	%	±%
Labour	Darran Travis	1,717	49.6	
BNP	Loraine Frazer	682	19.7	
Liberal Democrats	Michael Burch	572	16.5	
Conservative	Tom Dixon	490	14.2	
Majority		1,035	29.9	
Turnout		3,461		
Labour hold		Swing		

Castleford Central and Glasshoughton
Party	Candidate	Votes	%	±%
Labour	Denise Jeffery	1,884	52.8	
BNP	Rita Robinson	876	24.6	
Liberal Democrats	Michael Mann	475	13.3	
Conservative	Rebecca Mullins	333	9.3	
Majority		1,008	28.2	
Turnout		3,568		
Labour hold		Swing		

Crofton, Ryhill and Walton
Party	Candidate	Votes	%	±%
Labour	Graham Isherwood	1,594	35.9	
Conservative	Adam Parry	1,247	28.1	
BNP	Dean Crossland	868	19.6	
Independent	Janice Power	729	16.4	
Majority		347	7.8	
Turnout		4,438		
Labour hold		Swing		

Featherstone
Party	Candidate	Votes	%	±%
Independent	Roy Bickerton	2,207	50.1	
Labour	Margaret Isherwood	1,871	42.5	
Conservative	Jean Molloy	326	7.4	
Majority		336	7.6	
Turnout		4,404		
Independent hold		Swing		

Hemsworth
Party	Candidate	Votes	%	±%
Labour	Tracey Hardwick	1,773	66.1	
Conservative	Christian l'Anson	908	33.9	
Majority		865	32.2	
Turnout		2,681		
Labour hold		Swing		

Horbury and South Ossett
Party	Candidate	Votes	%	±%
Conservative	John Sharp	1,411	34.3	
Labour	David Watts	1,245	30.3	
Liberal Democrats	Mark Goodair	873	21.2	
BNP	John Aveyard	582	14.2	
Majority		166	4.0	
Turnout		4,111		
Conservative gain from Labour		Swing		

Knottingley
Party	Candidate	Votes	%	±%
Labour	Patricia Doyle	1,673	64.1	
Conservative	Nathan Garbutt	937	35.9	
Majority		736	28.2	
Turnout		2,610		
Labour hold		Swing		

Normanton
Party	Candidate	Votes	%	±%
Labour	Susan Blezard	1,370	43.3	
BNP	Adam Frazer	667	21.1	
Independent	William Wood	432	13.6	
Conservative	Tony Ayoade	426	13.5	
Liberal Democrats	Jack Smith	272	8.6	
Majority		703	22.2	
Turnout		3,167		
Labour hold		Swing		

Ossett
Party	Candidate	Votes	%	±%
Liberal Democrats	Peter Walker	1,752	38.7	
Labour	Gwendoline Page	1,179	26.0	
BNP	Suzy Cass	806	17.8	
Conservative	Tony Homewood	794	17.5	
Majority		573	12.7	
Turnout		4,531		
Liberal Democrats hold		Swing		

Pontefract North
Party	Candidate	Votes	%	±%
Labour	Clive Tennant	1,757	62.0	
Conservative	Mellisa Wan Omer	1,077	38.0	
Majority		680	24.0	
Turnout		2,834		
Labour hold		Swing		

Pontefract South
Party	Candidate	Votes	%	±%
Conservative	Geoffrey Walsh	1,852	42.2	
Labour	James Nicholson	1,810	41.2	
Independent	Clive Wigham	730	16.6	
Majority		42	1.0	
Turnout		4,392		
Conservative gain from Labour		Swing		

South Elmsall and South Kirkby
Party	Candidate	Votes	%	±%
Labour	Laurie Harrison	2,482	73.3	
Conservative	Sheila Scholes	902	26.7	
Majority		1,580	46.6	
Turnout		3,384		
Labour hold		Swing		

Stanley and Outwood
Party	Candidate	Votes	%	±%
Labour	Jacqueline Williams	1,246	33.5	
Conservative	Graham Ridler	986	26.5	
BNP	Glenn Fothergill	777	20.9	
Liberal Democrats	David Evans	706	19.0	
Majority		260	7.0	
Turnout		3,715		
Labour hold		Swing		

Wakefield East
Party	Candidate	Votes	%	±%
Labour	Olivia Rowley	1,541	44.2	
Conservative	Andrew Pesterfield	648	18.6	
Liberal Democrats	Ather Mohammed	540	15.5	
BNP	Dawn Byrom	528	15.1	
Socialist Alternative	Michael Griffiths	231	6.6	
Majority		893	25.6	
Turnout		3,488		
Labour hold		Swing		

Wakefield North
Party	Candidate	Votes	%	±%
Labour	Keith Rhodes	1,356	38.9	
Conservative	Angela Holwell	774	22.2	
Liberal Democrats	Douglas Dale	621	17.8	
BNP	Graham Thewlis-Hardy	609	17.5	
UKIP	Keith Wells	128	3.7	
Majority		582	16.7	
Turnout		3,488		
Labour hold		Swing		

Wakefield Rural
Party	Candidate	Votes	%	±%
Conservative	June Drysdale	2,471	51.1	
Labour	Hazel Chowcat	1,507	31.1	
Green	John Lumb	861	17.8	
Majority		964	20.0	
Turnout		4,839		
Conservative hold		Swing		

Wakefield South
Party	Candidate	Votes	%	±%
Conservative	Nadeen Ahmed	1,315	29.4	
Independent	Norman Hazell	1,298	29.0	
Labour	Charles Keith	747	16.7	
BNP	Neville Poynton	594	13.3	
Liberal Democrats	Stephen Huthall	521	11.6	
Majority		17	0.4	
Turnout		4,475		
Conservative gain from Independent		Swing		

Wakefield West
Party	Candidate	Votes	%	±%
Conservative	David Stone	2,318	57.1	
Labour	Anthony Richardson	1,241	30.6	
Liberal Democrats	Susan Morgan	500	12.3	
Majority		1,077	26.5	
Turnout		4,059		
Conservative hold		Swing		

Wrenthorpe and Outwood West
Party	Candidate	Votes	%	±%
Conservative	Betty Liles	1,843	46.3	
Labour	Rosaline Lund	1,410	35.4	
BNP	Grant Rowe	728	18.3	
Majority		433	10.9	
Turnout		3,981		
Conservative gain from Labour		Swing		
