= 2010 Wakefield Metropolitan District Council election =

2010 UK local government election

2010 local election results in Wakefield

The 2010 Wakefield Metropolitan District Council election took place on 6 May 2010 to elect members of Wakefield Metropolitan District Council in the West Yorkshire, England. One third of the council was up for election and the Labour party stayed in overall control of the council with an increased majority.

After the election, the composition of the council was as follows.

Party political make-up of Wakefield Council
Party	Seats			Current Council (2010)
Party	2007	2008	2010	Current Council (2010)
Labour	40	32	33	
Conservative	16	23	24	
Independent	4	6	5	
Lib Dems	3	2	1	

- Labour 33 (+1)
- Conservative 24 (+1)
- Independent 5 (-1)
- Liberal Democrat 1 (-1)

== Election result ==
Wakefield local election result 2010
Party	Seats	Gains	Losses	Net gain/loss	Seats %	Votes %	Votes	+/−
Labour	14	1	0	+1	67	43.4	64,138	+8%
Conservative	7	1	0	+1	33	28.8	42,587	-5%
Liberal Democrats	0	0	1	-1	0	11.6	17,185	+3%
BNP	0	0	0	0	0	9.0	13,247	+1%
Independent	0	0	1	-1	0	6.7	9,846	-7%
Green	0	0	0	0	0	0.3	508	-1%
UKIP	0	0	0	0	0	0.2	235	±0%
Socialist Alternative	0	0	0	0	0	0.1	159	±0%

== Ward results ==
=== Ackworth, North Elmsall and Upton ward ===
Ackworth, North Elmsall and Upton
Party	Candidate	Votes	%	±%
Labour	Allan Garbutt	3,001	37.6	−0.7
Conservative	Don Marshall	2,434	30.5	−12.7
Liberal Democrats	Brendan Power	1,034	13.0	−5.5
Independent	John Evans	745	9.3	+9.3
BNP	Ian Kitchen	722	9.1	+9.1
Majority		567	7.1	+12
Turnout		7,973	63	
Labour hold		Swing	+6%	

=== Airedale and Ferry Fryston ward ===
Airedale and Ferry Fryston
Party	Candidate	Votes	%	±%
Labour	Linda Broom	3,305	55.7	+9
Liberal Democrats	Paul Kirby	1,009	17.0	+2.7
Conservative	Mellisa Wan Omer	715	12.1	−5.9
BNP	Stephen Rogerson	668	11.3	−9.6
Independent	Jason Smart	220	3.7	+3.7
Majority		2,296	38.7	+12.9
Turnout		5,930	51.6	
Labour hold		Swing	+3.2%	

=== Altofts and Whitwood ward ===
Altofts and Whitwood
Party	Candidate	Votes	%	±%
Labour	Darran Travis	3,385	46.2	+8.8
Conservative	David Rudge	1,561	21.3	−1.2
Liberal Democrats	Michael Burch	1533	20.9	−2.6
BNP	Adam Frazer	818	11.2	−5.4
Majority		1,824	24.9	+11
Turnout		7,327	59.7	
Labour hold		Swing		

=== Castleford Central and Glasshoughton ward ===
Castleford Central and Glasshoughton
Party	Candidate	Votes	%	±%
Labour	Denise Jeffery	4,146	63.1	
Conservative	Eamonn Mullins	1,209	18.4	
BNP	Rita Robinson	1,147	17.5	
Majority		2,937	44.7	
Turnout		6,573	54.5	
Labour hold		Swing		

=== Crofton, Ryhill and Walton ward ===
Crofton, Ryhill and Walton
Party	Candidate	Votes	%	±%
Labour	Albert Manifield	3,166	39.9	
Conservative	Ian Sanders	2,305	29.0	
Liberal Democrats	Wendy Thompson	1,262	15.9	
BNP	Dean Crossland	846	10.6	
Independent	Barry Murphy	345	4.3	
Majority		861	10.8	
Turnout		7,944	65.4	
Labour hold		Swing		

=== Featherstone ward ===
Featherstone
Party	Candidate	Votes	%	±%
Labour	Dick Taylor	3,970	56.0	
Independent	Roy Bickerton	1,466	20.7	
Conservative	Michael Ledgard	923	13.0	
Independent	James Goodfellow	668	9.4	
Majority		2,504	35.3	
Turnout		7,090	56.2	
Labour gain from Independent		Swing		

=== Hemsworth ward ===
Hemsworth
Party	Candidate	Votes	%	±%
Labour	Sandra Pickin	3,630	54.7	
Independent	Raymond Warren	1,341	20.2	
Conservative	Philip Davies	942	14.2	
BNP	Ian Kitchen	646	10.6	
Majority		2,289	34.5	
Turnout		6,633	56.6	
Labour hold		Swing		

=== Horbury and South Ossett ward ===
Horbury and South Ossett
Party	Candidate	Votes	%	±%
Conservative	Elizabeth Hick	3,034	37.6	
Labour	Brian Holmes	2,932	36.3	
Liberal Democrats	David Smith	1,517	18.8	
BNP	Michael Bailey	558	6.9	
Majority		102	1.3	
Turnout		8,070	67.1	
Conservative hold		Swing		

=== Knottingley ward ===
Knottingley
Party	Candidate	Votes	%	±%
Labour	Harry Ellis	3,092	55.9	
Conservative	Jon Wadey	1,379	24.9	
BNP	Norman Tate	1,012	18.3	
Majority		1,713	31.0	
Turnout		5,528	52.2	
Labour hold		Swing		

=== Normanton ward ===
Normanton
Party	Candidate	Votes	%	±%
Labour	Elaine Blezard	3,139	47.0	
Conservative	Jean Molloy	1,370	20.5	
Independent	Graeme Milner	1,231	18.4	
BNP	Philip Downton	885	13.3	
Majority		1,769	26.5	
Turnout		6,674	53.6	
Labour hold		Swing		

=== Ossett ward ===
Ossett
Party	Candidate	Votes	%	±%
Conservative	Ian Bunney	2,933	35.1	
Labour	Tony Richardson	2,401	28.7	
Liberal Democrats	Peter Hunter	2,327	27.8	
BNP	Ian Senior	685	8.2	
Majority		532	6.4	
Turnout		8,368	66.2	
Conservative gain from Liberal Democrats		Swing		

=== Pontefract North ward ===
Pontefract North
Party	Candidate	Votes	%	±%
Labour	Clive Tennant	3,051	45.6	
Conservative	Carl Milner	1,594	23.8	
Liberal Democrats	Doug Dale	1,008	15.1	
Independent	Bob Evison	279	4.2	
Green	Rennie Smith	150	2.2	
Majority		1,457	21.8	
Turnout		6,692	55.6	
Labour hold		Swing		

=== Pontefract South ward ===
Pontefract South
Party	Candidate	Votes	%	±%
Conservative	Geoff Walsh	2,978	39.1	
Labour	Jack Kershaw	2,773	36.4	
Liberal Democrats	Chris Rush	1,333	17.5	
Independent	Matt Haddleton	275	3.6	
Green	Neil Frankland	150	2.2	
Majority		205	2.7	
Turnout		7,612	63	
Conservative hold		Swing		

=== South Elmsall and South Kirkby ward ===
South Elmsall and South Kirkby
Party	Candidate	Votes	%	±%
Labour	Laurie Harrison	3,433	46.8	
Independent	Fred Hilton	2,129	29.0	
BNP	Linda Westwood	1,000	13.6	
Conservative	Christian IAnson	734	10.0	
Majority		1,304	17.8	
Turnout		7,334	54.4	
Labour hold		Swing		

=== Stanley and Outwood East ward ===
Stanley and Outwood East
Party	Candidate	Votes	%	±%
Labour	Jacqui Williams	2,936	37.5	
Conservative	Richard Wakefield	2,578	32.9	
Liberal Democrats	David Evans	1,539	19.6	
BNP	Keith Sharp	761	9.7	
Majority		358	4.6	
Turnout		7,838	65.2	
Labour hold		Swing		

=== Wakefield East ward ===
Wakefield East
Party	Candidate	Votes	%	±%
Labour	Olivia Rowley	3,109	49.5	
Conservative	Anthony Bracewell	1,287	20.5	
BNP	Robert Arnold	567	9.0	
Socialist Alternative	Michael Griffiths	159	10.7	
Majority		1,822	29.0	
Turnout		6,284	53.5	
Labour hold		Swing		

=== Wakefield North ward ===
Wakefield North
Party	Candidate	Votes	%	±%
Labour	Tracey Hardwick	2,703	42.2	
Conservative	Gareth Hunt	1,904	29.7	
Liberal Democrats	Simon Moxon	1,101	17.2	
BNP	Grant Rowe	449	7.0	
UKIP	Keith Wells	235	3.7	
Majority		799	12.5	
Turnout		6,412	57.4	
Labour hold		Swing		

=== Wakefield Rural ward ===
Wakefield Rural
Party	Candidate	Votes	%	±%
Conservative	June Drysdale	4,107	44.6	
Labour	John Newsome	2,859	31.1	
Liberal Democrats	Mark Goodair	1,507	16.4	
BNP	Ian Light	700	7.6	
Majority		1,248	13.6	
Turnout		9,203	69	
Conservative hold		Swing		

=== Wakefield South ward ===
Wakefield South
Party	Candidate	Votes	%	±%
Conservative	Nadeem Ahmed	2,710	38.2	−1.6
Labour	Charlie Keith	1,703	24.0	
Independent	Norman Hazell	1,147	16.2	
Liberal Democrats	Stephen Nuthall	1,106	15.6	
BNP	Elizabeth Downton	416	5.9	
Majority		1,007	14.2	
Turnout		7,097	66.6	
Conservative hold		Swing		

=== Wakefield West ward ===
Wakefield West
Party	Candidate	Votes	%	±%
Conservative	John Stone	2,432	38.1	
Labour	Hilary Mitchell	2,252	35.3	
Liberal Democrats	Susan Morgan	909	14.3	
BNP	Neville Poynton	559	8.8	+0.3
Green	Brian Else	208	3.8	−0.5
Majority		180	2.8	
Turnout		6,378	56	
Conservative hold		Swing		

=== Wrenthorpe and Outwood West ward ===
Wrenthorpe and Outwood West
Party	Candidate	Votes	%	±%
Conservative	Betty Liles	3,398	45.9	
Labour	Martyn Johnson	3,152	42.5	
BNP	Graham Thewlis-Hardy	808	10.9	
Majority		246	3.4	
Turnout		7,411	64.5	
Conservative hold		Swing		
