= 2007 Wakefield Metropolitan District Council election =

2007 UK local government election

2007 local election results in Wakefield

The 2007 Wakefield Metropolitan District Council election took place on 3 May 2007 to elect members of Wakefield Metropolitan District Council in West Yorkshire, England. One third of the council was up for election and the Labour Party kept overall control of the council.

After the election, the composition of the council was:

- Labour 40
- Conservative 16
- Independent 4
- Liberal Democrat 3

== Candidates ==
21 seats were contested in the election with both Labour and Conservatives standing in all of the seats. Other parties that put up candidates were the Liberal Democrats, British National Party, Green Party, United Kingdom Independence Party, Socialist Alternative party, British Voice Party and some independents.

== Election result ==
The results saw Labour lose 2 seats to the Conservatives in Horbury and South Ossett and Wrenthorpe and Outwood West wards. One of the two losses was the deputy leader of the council, Phil Dobson, who was defeated in Wrenthorpe and Outwood West by 173 votes. However Labour gained a seat in Normanton from independent, Graeme Milner, and remained in control of the council. Overall turnout was 31.62%.

Following the election, Denise Jeffrey, was appointed the new deputy leader in a reshuffle of the cabinet.

Wakefield local election result 2007
Party	Seats	Gains	Losses	Net gain/loss	Seats %	Votes %	Votes	+/−
Labour	12	1	2	-1	57.1	39.0	30,623	-2.7
Conservative	6	2	0	+2	28.6	30.0	23,494	+0.9
Independent	2	0	1	-1	9.5	10.2	8,035	+2.6
Liberal Democrats	1	0	0	0	4.8	10.1	7,956	+0.7
BNP	0	0	0	0	0.0	8.3	6,498	-2.4
Green	0	0	0	0	0.0	1.4	1,116	+0.3
British Voice	0	0	0	0	0.0	0.4	324	+0.4
Socialist Alternative	0	0	0	0	0.0	0.3	240	+0.0
UKIP	0	0	0	0	0.0	0.2	148	+0.0

== Ward results ==
Ackworth, North Elmsall and Upton
Party	Candidate	Votes	%	±%
Labour	Jean Martin	1,407	37.2	−4.4
Conservative	Richard Molloy	1,124	29.7	−1.6
Independent	John Evans	708	18.7	+4.9
Liberal Democrats	Oliver Wadsworth	544	14.4	+1.2
Majority		283	7.5	−2.8
Turnout		3,783		
Labour hold		Swing		

Airedale and Ferry Fryston
Party	Candidate	Votes	%	±%
Labour	Yvonne Crewe	1,689	57.2	−0.8
BNP	Stephen Rogerson	553	18.7	−6.2
Conservative	Eamonn Mullins	374	12.7	−4.4
Liberal Democrats	Paul Kirby	337	11.4	+11.4
Majority		1,136	38.5	+5.4
Turnout		2,953		
Labour hold		Swing		

Altofts and Whitwood
Party	Candidate	Votes	%	±%
Labour	Heather Hudson	1,563	48.2	−1.4
Liberal Democrats	Michael Burch	619	19.1	+2.6
BNP	Dawn Byrom	546	16.8	−2.9
Conservative	Tom Dixon	513	15.8	+1.6
Majority		944	29.1	−0.8
Turnout		3,241		
Labour hold		Swing		

Castleford Central and Glasshoughton
Party	Candidate	Votes	%	±%
Labour	Tony Wallis	2,077	63.4	+10.6
BNP	Rita Robinson	745	22.7	−1.9
Conservative	Tony Ayoade	453	13.8	+4.5
Majority		1,332	40.7	+12.5
Turnout		3,275		
Labour hold		Swing		

Crofton, Ryhill and Walton
Party	Candidate	Votes	%	±%
Labour	Maureen Cummings	2,029	46.1	+10.2
Conservative	Elizabeth Hick	1,500	34.1	+6.0
BNP	Dean Crossland	873	19.8	+0.2
Majority		529	12.0	+4.2
Turnout		4,402		
Labour hold		Swing		

Featherstone
Party	Candidate	Votes	%	±%
Independent	Pauline Guy	1,828	41.5	−8.6
Labour	Maureen Tennant-King	1,698	38.5	−3.0
BNP	Michael Wain	392	8.9	+8.9
Liberal Democrats	Brendan Power	260	5.9	+5.9
Conservative	Charles Scholes	232	5.3	−2.1
Majority		130	3.0	−4.6
Turnout		4,410		
Independent hold		Swing		

Hemsworth
Party	Candidate	Votes	%	±%
Labour	Wayne Jenkins	1,547	51.8	−14.3
Independent	John Helliwell	993	33.3	+33.3
Conservative	Christian l'Anson	446	14.9	−19.0
Majority		554	18.5	−13.7
Turnout		2,986		
Labour hold		Swing		

Horbury and South Ossett
Party	Candidate	Votes	%	±%
Conservative	Alyson Ripley	1,822	42.7	+8.4
Labour	Brian Holmes	1,623	38.0	+7.7
Liberal Democrats	David Rowland	825	19.3	−1.9
Majority		199	4.7	+0.7
Turnout		4,270		
Conservative gain from Labour		Swing		

Knottingley
Party	Candidate	Votes	%	±%
Labour	Glenn Burton	1,545	61.5	−2.6
Conservative	Mellisa Wan Omer	498	19.8	−16.1
Independent	Nathan Garbutt	470	18.7	+18.7
Majority		1,047	41.7	+13.5
Turnout		2,513		
Labour hold		Swing		

Normanton
Party	Candidate	Votes	%	±%
Labour	David Dagger	1,218	40.0	−3.3
Independent	Graeme Milner	758	24.9	+11.3
BNP	Adam Frazer	488	16.0	−5.1
Conservative	Michael Ledgard	353	11.6	−1.9
Liberal Democrats	Jack Smith	230	7.5	−1.1
Majority		460	15.1	−7.1
Turnout		3,047		
Labour gain from Independent		Swing		

Ossett
Party	Candidate	Votes	%	±%
Liberal Democrats	Elizabeth Knowles	1,665	36.5	−2.2
Conservative	Susan Armitage	1,162	25.5	+8.0
Labour	David Watts	1,109	24.3	−1.7
BNP	Suzy Cass	620	13.6	−4.2
Majority		503	11.0	−1.7
Turnout		4,556		
Liberal Democrats hold		Swing		

Pontefract North
Party	Candidate	Votes	%	±%
Labour	Patricia Garbutt	1,695	52.8	−9.2
Conservative	Philip Thomas	1,517	47.2	+9.2
Majority		178	5.6	−18.4
Turnout		3,212		
Labour hold		Swing		

Pontefract South
Party	Candidate	Votes	%	±%
Conservative	Philip Booth	2,241	49.8	+7.6
Labour	Bill O'Brien	1,685	37.4	−3.8
Liberal Democrats	Chris Rush	575	12.8	+12.8
Majority		556	12.4	+11.4
Turnout		4,501		
Conservative hold		Swing		

South Elmsall and South Kirkby
Party	Candidate	Votes	%	±%
Independent	Harold Mills	2,042	55.0	+55.0
Labour	Malcolm Evans	1,280	34.5	−38.8
Conservative	Sheila Scholes	390	10.5	−16.2
Majority		762	20.5	
Turnout		3,712		
Independent hold		Swing		

Stanley and Outwood East
Party	Candidate	Votes	%	±%
Labour	Clive Hudson	1,338	35.9	+2.4
Conservative	Simon Wilson	1,130	30.3	+3.8
Liberal Democrats	David Evans	679	18.2	−0.8
BNP	Glenn Fothergill	581	15.6	−5.3
Majority		208	5.6	−1.4
Turnout		3,728		
Labour hold		Swing		

Wakefield East
Party	Candidate	Votes	%	±%
Labour	Ron Halliday	1,603	46.6	+2.4
Conservative	Margaret Holwell	773	22.5	+3.9
Liberal Democrats	Ather Mohammed	426	12.4	−3.1
BNP	Robert Arnold	399	11.6	−3.5
Socialist Alternative	Michael Griffiths	240	7.0	+0.4
Majority		830	24.1	−1.5
Turnout		3,441		
Labour hold		Swing		

Wakefield North
Party	Candidate	Votes	%	±%
Labour	Margaret Isherwood	1,262	36.6	−2.3
Conservative	Nick Pickles	957	27.8	+5.6
Liberal Democrats	Mark Goodair	612	17.8	+0.0
BNP	Graham Thewlis-Hardy	405	11.8	−5.7
UKIP	Keith Wells	148	4.3	+0.6
Independent	Mark Harrop	61	1.8	+1.8
Majority		305	8.8	−7.9
Turnout		3,445		
Labour hold		Swing		

Wakefield Rural
Party	Candidate	Votes	%	±%
Conservative	Bryan Denson	2,373	52.4	+1.3
Labour	Martyn Johnson	1,210	26.7	−4.4
Green	John Lumb	642	14.2	−3.6
Independent	Michael Greensmith	300	6.6	+6.6
Majority		1,163	25.7	+5.7
Turnout		4,525		
Conservative hold		Swing		

Wakefield South
Party	Candidate	Votes	%	±%
Conservative	Monica Graham	1,817	41.6	+12.2
Independent	Norman Hazell	875	20.1	−8.9
Labour	Charles Keith	756	17.3	+0.6
BNP	Neville Poynton	402	9.2	−4.1
Liberal Democrats	Stephen Nuthall	316	7.2	−4.4
Green	Miriam Hawkins	197	4.5	+4.5
Majority		942	21.5	+21.1
Turnout		4,363		
Conservative hold		Swing		

Wakefield West
Party	Candidate	Votes	%	±%
Conservative	Bill Sanders	2,202	54.9	−2.2
Labour	Javed Iqbal	845	21.1	−9.5
Liberal Democrats	Susan Morgan	366	9.1	−3.2
British Voice	Norman Tate	324	8.1	+8.1
Green	Brian Else	277	6.9	+6.9
Majority		1,357	33.8	+7.3
Turnout		4,014		
Conservative hold		Swing		

Wrenthorpe and Outwood West
Party	Candidate	Votes	%	±%
Conservative	Richard Hunt	1,617	39.9	−6.4
Labour	Philip Dobson	1,444	35.6	+0.2
Liberal Democrats	Margaret Dodd	502	12.4	+12.4
BNP	Grant Rowe	494	12.2	−6.1
Majority		173	4.3	−6.6
Turnout		4,057		
Conservative gain from Labour		Swing		
