= Yorkshire Party =

British political party

- Chair: Richard Honnoraty
- Leader: Dan Woodlock
- Founded: April 2014; 12 years ago
- Headquarters: York Hub; Popeshead Court Offices; Peter Lane; York; YO1 8SU
- Ideology: Regionalism; Social democracy Devolution
- Political position: Centre to centre-left
- European affiliation: European Free Alliance
- Colours: Sky blue
- House of Commons (Yorkshire seats): 0 / 54
- Local government in Yorkshire: 0 / 1,139
- Directly elected mayors in Yorkshire: 0 / 4

Website
- www.yorkshireparty.org.uk

The Yorkshire Party is a regionalist political party in Yorkshire.

Founded in 2014, it campaigns for the establishment of a devolved Yorkshire Parliament within the United Kingdom, with powers over education, environment, transport and housing.

It describes itself as a centrist party built on social-democratic principles and believes that "changing the way the UK political system works is the best way to address the everyday issues faced by people living in Yorkshire".

The party has parish, town, district and county councillors. It stood 21 candidates at the 2017 general election, and secured 8.6% of the vote in the 2018 Sheffield City Region mayoral election. It fielded 28 candidates at the 2019 general election.

In the 2021 West Yorkshire mayoral election it received nearly 60,000 votes (nearly 10% of the vote share) in the first round and third overall, behind the Labour Party and the Conservative Party. The party came third behind Labour and the Conservatives in the first round of the 2022 South Yorkshire mayoral election, with a higher vote share of 13.4%, only 3.1% away from beating the Conservatives into the second round.

== History ==
The party was founded as Yorkshire First in 2014 by the businessmen Stewart Arnold and Richard Honnoraty, and the management consultant Richard Carter. Carter was the party's first leader. The party's launch was welcomed by a spokesperson for Mebyon Kernow.

Contesting the 2014 European Parliamentary elections in the Yorkshire and the Humber constituency, the Yorkshire Party received 19,017 votes (1.5%). Arnold, its lead candidate, described this as "a hugely significant result".

In 2015 it fought its first general election, fielding 14 candidates. The party also gained its first town and parish council seats. Internationally, the party was granted observer status in the European Free Alliance grouping and has since become a full member.

In 2016 it stood 17 candidates across six local authorities, and also fought the Sheffield Brightside & Hillsborough by-election. In July, Arnold took over from Carter as leader of the party, with Chris Whitwood becoming deputy leader. The party joined the Make Votes Matter Alliance for Proportional Representation.

In May 2017 the Yorkshire Party stood in Doncaster for the first time, contesting the mayoral election and saving its deposit. In addition, the party stood seven candidates for council elections. In June 2017 it stood 21 candidates in the general election, coming third in three constituencies. This resulted in the Yorkshire Party becoming the sixth-most-voted-for party in England and one of only three parties to increase its vote share on 2015.

In 2018 its Rotherham candidate, Mick Bower, was selected to contest the Sheffield City Region mayoral election. Securing 8.6% of the vote, gaining fourth place of the seven parties standing, the party also came third in three of the four participating council areas, beating the Liberal Democrats and the Green Party of England and Wales in Barnsley, Doncaster and Rotherham. The 22,318 votes gained was also the largest ever individual tally gained by the party.

In summer 2018 the party gained its first district and county level councillors when the former mayor of Northallerton and Hambleton District councillor, Claire Palmer, and the senior Conservative councillor on Selby District Council and North Yorkshire County Council, Mike Jordan, defected. Jordan said that he was joining the Yorkshire Party because he believed the government was "not doing Yorkshire the justice it deserves".

In March 2019 Whitwood became party leader and Laura Walker took on the role of deputy. Whitwood expressed his optimism at the positive role the Yorkshire Party could play in the politics of people's everyday lives, describing the period as a golden opportunity where "small parties can make a huge difference and carry a huge amount of influence".

In April 2019, with the fifth anniversary of the party's formation, it fielded a record number of candidates in that year's local elections, more than double the previous record.

The party fielded six candidates at the 2019 European Parliament election. None were elected. They fielded 28 candidates in the 2019 general election: none was elected, but with 29,201 votes, they received the third-highest number of votes of any party that did not get an MP elected, after the Brexit Party and the Ulster Unionist Party.

In May 2020 Bob Buxton, a teacher, was elected to serve a two-year term as leader following the resignation of Whitwood. In June 2020 a Shipley businessman, Darren Longhorn, was appointed interim party chairman.

At the end of August 2020 Councillor George Derx of the Stainforth and Barnby Dun ward in Doncaster defected from the Labour Party and joined the Yorkshire Party. He said that he believed that the party had the "right policies for our region". As a result of this defection, the Yorkshire Party is now represented by eight councillors in local government.

On 14 June 2023 the Conservative Party lost its majority on North Yorkshire Council following the resignation of one of its councillors, Mike Jordan, who represents the Camblesforth & Carlton ward in the Selby area. He cited concerns about the party nationally as his reason. He re-joined the Yorkshire Party and was announced as the party's candidate in the 2023 Selby and Ainsty by-election. Jordan was, however, listed on the Statement of Persons Nominated with no party affiliation. He received 4.2% of the votes.

They stood four candidates in the 2026 United Kingdom local elections.

== Ideology and policies ==
The party advocates for regional devolution for Yorkshire, such as by Yorkshire having a regional parliament and supports other regions of England having the right to each choose to have a regional parliament. Its argument for regional devolution is said to be founded on the principle of subsidiarity – the belief that matters ought to be handled by the smallest, lowest or least centralised competent authority.

The party promotes a range of policies covering education, environment, transport and housing it describes as economically centrist and underpinned by social-democratic principles.

The party supports building a West Yorkshire metro system that would extend into North Yorkshire.

== Electoral performance and elected representatives ==
In 2014 it started by fielding candidates for the European Parliament election in the Yorkshire and the Humber constituency, winning 1.5% of the vote with just over 19,000 votes.

At the 2015 general election it contested 14 constituencies, winning 6,811 votes and an average vote share of 1.04%.

The party increased its number of candidates at the 2017 general election to 21, winning 20,958 votes, a huge increase from the previous election. The party also increased its average vote share in seats it contested to 2.1% of the vote. While contesting seats only within Yorkshire, the party received enough votes to become the sixth-most-popular party in England.

The party won its first principal authority elections at the 2019 local elections, taking seats on Selby District Council and East Riding of Yorkshire Council.

At the 2019 European Parliament election, in the Yorkshire and the Humber constituency it received over 50,000 votes (4% of the vote share). It was the only non-parliamentary party to outpoll Change UK.

At the 2019 local elections the Yorkshire Party won four seats on Selby District Council and two on East Riding of Yorkshire Council. When taken alongside the two seats the party holds on the North Yorkshire County Council and Doncaster Metropolitan Borough Council due to defections.

At the 2019 general election it further increased its number of candidates to 28 and secured 29,201 votes in total — its best electoral performance in a general election. The party's average vote share remained constant at 2.1%, with a slight increase of 0.07%.

In the 2021 West Yorkshire mayoral elections, it received nearly 60,000 votes (nearly 10% of the vote share) in the first round - third overall, behind Labour and the Conservatives.

The Yorkshire Party contested the 2022 local elections, fielding 37 candidates across Yorkshire, with the Barnsley environmentalist and entrepreneur Simon Biltcliffe running as the party's candidate for the South of Yorkshire Mayoral election. Biltcliffe finished third with 13.4% of first choice votes.

The Yorkshire Party contested the 2022 Wakefield by-election nominating David Herdson as candidate. He came fourth with 4.3% of the vote, ahead of Reform, the Lib Dems and Greens, and a share which remains the highest the Yorkshire Party has polled at a Westminster election.

The party stood 27 candidates at the 2024 general election. It secured 17,227 votes in total.

Prior to 17 July 2025, the party had three councillors on the East Riding of Yorkshire Council representing Bridlington until they defected to the Green Party.

== See also ==
- North East Party, a regional party in the North East England region.
- Northern Party, a former regional party based in Lancashire
- Northern Independence Party, a regional secessionist party in Northern England
- Social Justice Party, a party launched in Whitby with a councillor on the North Yorkshire Council
