= Featherstone =

Town and civil parish in West Yorkshire, England

Coordinates: 53.70°N 1.37°W

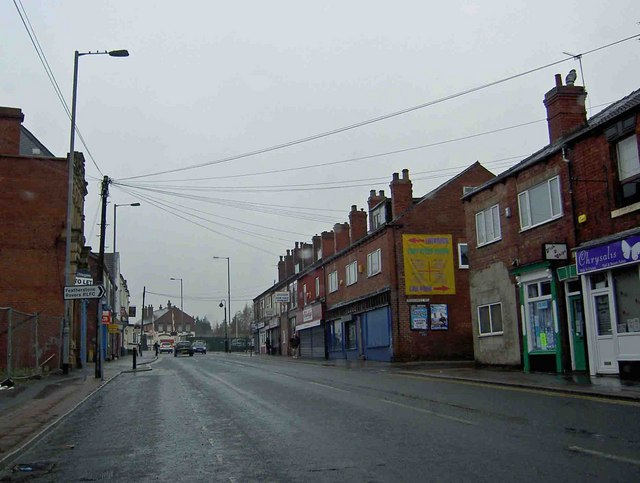
- Station Lane, Featherstone

- Location within West Yorkshire
- Population: 15,244 (2011 census)
- OS grid reference: SE424206
- Civil parish: Featherstone
- Metropolitan borough: City of Wakefield
- Metropolitan county: West Yorkshire
- Region: Yorkshire and the Humber
- Country: England
- Sovereign state: United Kingdom
- Post town: PONTEFRACT
- Postcode district: WF7
- Dialling code: 01977
- Police: West Yorkshire
- Fire: West Yorkshire
- Ambulance: Yorkshire
- UK Parliament: Normanton and Hemsworth

Featherstone is a town and civil parish in the City of Wakefield, West Yorkshire, England, two miles south-west of Pontefract. Historically part of the West Riding of Yorkshire, in 2011 it had a population of 15,244. Featherstone railway station is on the Pontefract Line.

== History ==
Despite most population growth taking place around the Industrial Revolution, Featherstone traces its history back much further than this. The Domesday Book (1086) records "In Ferestane [Featherstone] and Prestone [Purston] and Arduwic [Hardwick] and Osele [Nostell], Ligulf had 16 carucates of land for geld, and 6 ploughs may be there." It is thought that a local public house, the Traveller's Rest, can trace its origins to the 17th century whilst the former Jubilee Hotel, a listed building now converted to apartments, once provided a resting place for wealthy Victorians and their horses. Standing stones just outside the village indicate that there is evidence of an ancient druid grove.

The original village is now known as North Featherstone (at the junction of the B6134 and the B6421 today), set around All Saints' Church and joined to today's centre by Featherstone Lane. The Featherstone family lived at Ackton Hall (now demolished), in the hamlet of Ackton about a mile to the west. What is now known as Featherstone was a later development (originally called South Featherstone) near to the railway station and the village of Purston Jaglin.

Like many surrounding areas, Featherstone grew around coal mining. Coal had been mined at Featherstone since the 13th century and remains of bell pits can still be seen to the north of Park Lane at North Featherstone. In 1848, the opening of the Wakefield, Pontefract and Goole railway line through Featherstone provided the basis for large scale coal mining in Featherstone, by opening up new markets in the South of England and Europe. Featherstone Main Colliery was opened in 1866, followed by Ackton Hall Colliery in 1873. These were closer to what is now the main part of Featherstone, which consequently expanded.

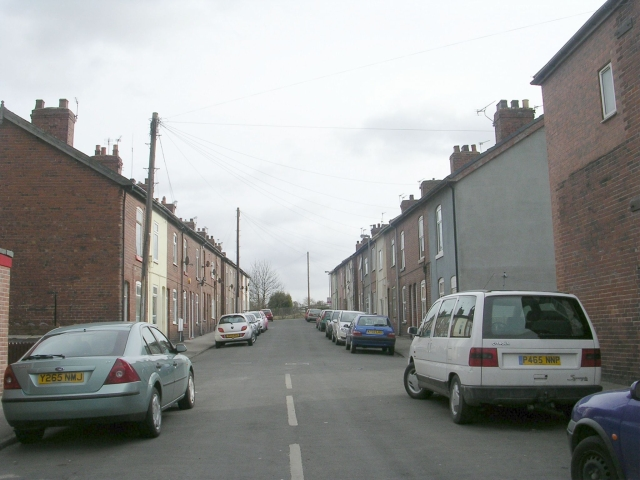
Terraced Housing on Carlton street

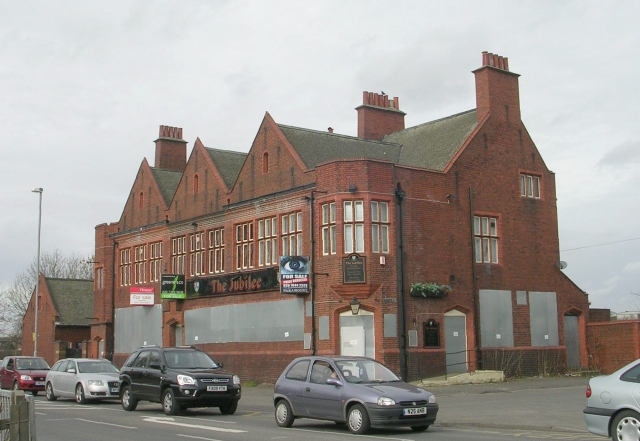
The Jubilee Pub

The town came to national attention during a national "lockout" of mine workers in 1893 due to low coal prices and overproduction. Soldiers fired on a crowd who were demonstrating at the colliery gates, killing two instantly. (The Guardian claimed that a third man, a Mr. Tomlinson from Normanton, died the following day from injuries from being shot but only two dead are named on the town's sculpture.) A distinctive sculpture marking the centenary of the Featherstone Massacre stands in the shopping precinct and a large mural depicting the town's heritage can be seen at the town's main crossroads. Ackton Hall Colliery was the first pit to close following the end of the miners' strike and this could not be contested as geological difficulties had made it impossible for the pit to continue production.

Featherstone is the subject of a study, Coal is Our Life, by the sociologist Norman Dennis, published in 1956.

Opened in the 1950s, Purston Park takes up a large area of space and offers a lake and a children's play area. There was also previously a bowling green, until being changed to a rose garden in 2004. It has been made out of the grounds of what was originally a private residence and a country estate, with the stately home formerly acting as the town hall. This building was sold to developers in 2007 and has since been converted into luxury flats.

Featherstone is undergoing continual change and as part of this a new, state-of-the-art £2.5-million community centre has been built in Station Lane. The "Pit Houses", the houses constituting a council estate which formerly belonged to the National Coal Board, have been demolished to make room for further developments.

== Memorials ==
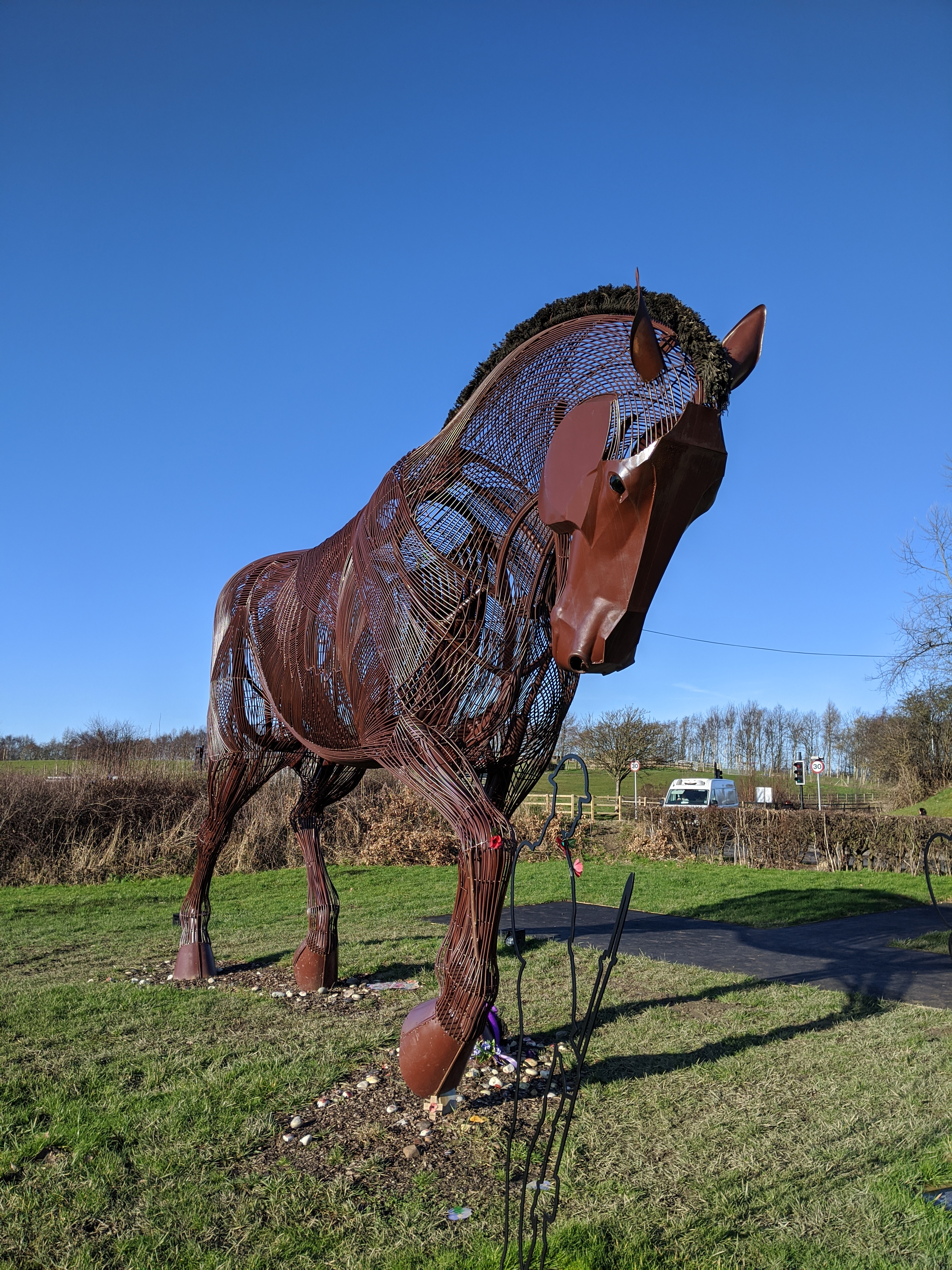
War Horse - A Place of Peace to be Together, commemorating the soldiers from Featherstone who died in WWI

In 2018, a sculpture was erected called War Horse - A Place of Peace to be Together, to commemorate the soldiers from the town who died in the First World War. It was designed by model makers and artists Cod Steaks, and funded by a grant from FCC Communities Foundation (formerly known as WREN).

== Toponymy ==
Like many place-names in the area, 'Featherstone' derives from Old English. The name is formed of two elements: feother, meaning 'four', and stān, meaning 'stone'. Therefore, the names means "(place at) the four stones". These 'four stones' are likely to have been some waymarker or monument by a road or other well-used route through the town. The settlement was recorded in the Domesday Book of 1086 as Fredestan.

== Governance ==
Featherstone village historically formed a township within the much larger (ecclesiastical) parish of Featherstone; the parish also included Purston Jaglin, Whitwood and Ackton. In 1894, Featherstone urban district (UD) was formed from the civil parishes of Featherstone, Purston Jaglin, Ackton and Snydale. In 1974 the town became part of the metropolitan borough of Wakefield; currently the borough's Featherstone ward comprises the former UD area plus Sharlston.

Featherstone is part of the Normanton and Hemsworth constituency, and is represented by Labour MP Jon Trickett in the House of Commons.

At the 2026 Wakefield Metropolitan District Council election on 7th May 2026, all three Labour District Councillors lost their seats for the first time since Wakefield Council began in 1974. Featherstone ward is now represented by three Reform UK District Councillors: James Mulligan, Jacob Padget and Gilly Womack.

Featherstone Town Council is controlled by Labour: Scott Haslam is the Mayor for the year 2026/27.

== Fighting decline ==
Starting in the mid-1970s to the mid-1980s, the area went into an era of sharp decline in the residents' quality of life. Historians and social scientists have put forward many factors. The gradual loss of the coal industry coupled with poor housing and education. This has begun to improve in recent years with new housing developments, better schools and plans to breathe life back into the local business community via various climate friendly projects.

== Transport ==
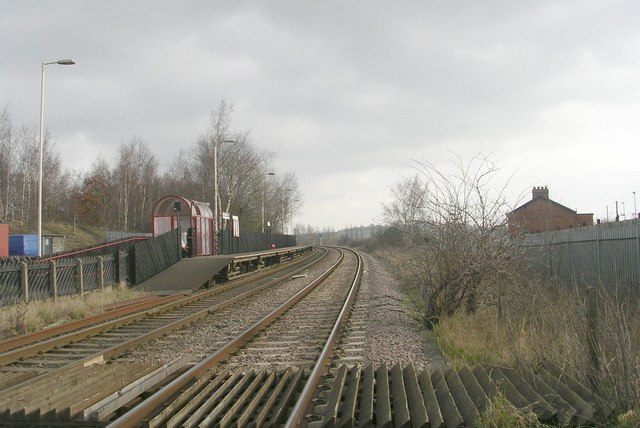
Featherstone railway station

Featherstone has a railway station on the Pontefract Line. There are also bus services operated by Arriva Yorkshire and Ross Travel. The M62 lies close by.

== Education ==
The town has two secondary schools, the Featherstone Academy and St Wilfrid's Catholic High School.

Primary and infant schools include St Thomas' Junior, Girnhill Infants', Purston Infants', North Featherstone Junior and Infants' and All Saints Junior and Infants'.

== Religion ==
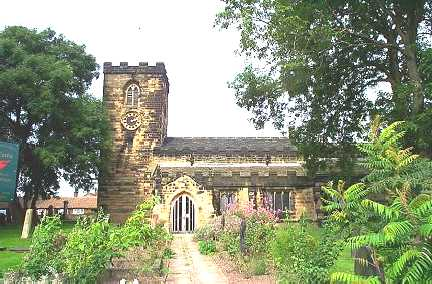
All Saints' Church

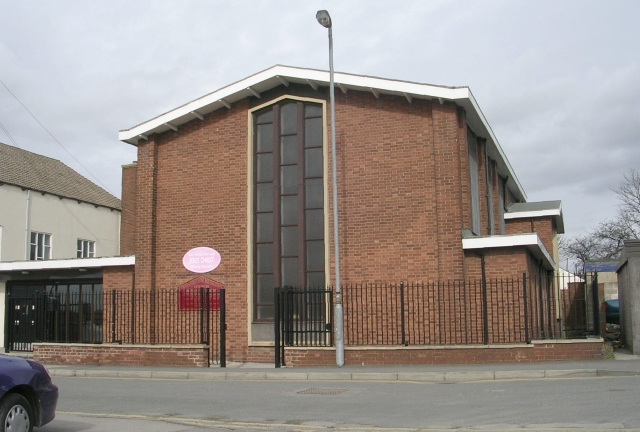
The former Methodist chapel

Featherstone has a number of churches: St Thomas's Church (Anglican) – built from traditional Yorkshire sandstone, St Thomas's Church and the adjacent vicarage were built in the 1870s. Due to a lack of funding the church has no bell tower, and instead the bell hangs outside on the church's south wall. The original vicarage is now a private residence. All Saints' Church (Anglican), the Methodist church, and the South Featherstone Gospel Hall are also still active churches.

A former Methodist chapel on Wakefield Road has since been turned into an antiques salesroom and the North Featherstone Gospel Hall has been converted into a private dwelling. St Gerard Majella's Roman Catholic Church was closed in the summer of 2008.

== Sport ==
=== Featherstone Rovers ===
The town's sport scene is dominated by its local rugby league club, Featherstone Rovers, who have won the Challenge Cup on three occasions, most recently on 7 May 1983, and won the League Championship in 1976–77. Originally made up of local miners, the club was formed in the Railway Hotel in 1902, then re-formed in 1906. They are currently in the Championship, after being promoted in 2007, beating Oldham in the Play-Offs final. In the 2010 season, Rovers finished first in the league table with a 100% away record and claimed the League Leader's Shield. They reached the Championship Grand Final by beating Halifax 46–16 in the Semi-Final, only to be defeated by Halifax in the final on a golden point (22–23). They went one better in 2012 beating Sheffield Eagles 44–4 in the Grand Final to become Champions. In 2021, the club won the RFL 1895 Cup.

The Featherstone Rovers Women's team was launched in 2011 and won the Women's Challenge Cup in 2012. They were one of the four teams to take part in the inaugural season of the RFL Women's Super League in 2017.

=== Featherstone Lions ===
The community side Featherstone Lions also hails from the town and currently play their home games from their base, Mill Pond Stadium. Featherstone Lions have open age men's teams that play in the National Conference League Yorkshire Men's League they also have junior teams from U7-U18 both boys and girls along with a women's open age side.

== See also ==
- Listed buildings in Featherstone
- Wilfred Adey
