= Listed buildings in Featherstone =

Featherstone is a civil parish in the metropolitan borough of the City of Wakefield, West Yorkshire, England. The parish contains 14 listed buildings that are recorded in the National Heritage List for England. Of these, two are listed at Grade II*, the middle of the three grades, and the others are at Grade II, the lowest grade. The parish contains the town of Featherstone and the surrounding area. The listed buildings consist of houses, a former lodge, a bridge, and two churches, the churchyard of the older church containing a cross shaft and monuments that are listed.

== Key ==
Grade	Criteria
II*	Particularly important buildings of more than special interest
II	Buildings of national importance and special interest

== Buildings ==
Name and location	Photograph	Date	Notes	Grade
Cross shaft 53.69347°N 1.36278°W	—	Late medieval	The lower half of a cross shaft is in the churchyard of All Saints Church, and is in limestone. It is about 1.5 metres (4 ft 11 in) high, about 30 centimetres (12 in) square in section, and has chamfered corners. The top is shaped for former octagonal continuation.	II
All Saints Church; 53.69360°N 1.36256°W		15th century (probable)	The church is in sandstone with a stone slate roof, and is in Perpendicular style. It consists of a nave, a south aisle, a south porch, a chancel with a south chapel, and a west tower. The tower has three stages, and contains a two-light west window, a clock face on the south front, a moulded cornice, and an embattled parapet. There is a two-stage stair turret on the north side. The porch has a coped gable, and contains a doorway with a pointed arch and a moulded surround, and corner pinnacles. Along the sides of the church are embattled parapets.	II*
Grange Cottage; 53.68335°N 1.38996°W	—	15th century (probable)	A manor house, later a farmhouse, then a private house, it has a timber framed core, later encased in stone and brick and rendered, and a tile roof. The house consists of a hall range with one storey and an attic and 1½ bays, and a cross-wing with two storeys and two bays on the left. The openings have been altered, and include inserted doorways, casement windows, and a dormer.	II*
Huntwick Lodge, gate arch and walls 53.67389°N 1.37881°W		1655	A lodge to Nostell Priory, now in ruins, it is in sandstone and has a stone slate roof and gables with moulded coping. There are two storeys and a front of two gabled bays. In one bay is a doorway with a chamfered surround, a Tudor arch, an initialled and dated lintel, and a moulded hood mould. Elsewhere are mullioned windows, some blocked. Attached is an elliptical-headed gate arch with imposts, two storeys, and rectangular piers, each with a coved niche. At the top of each pier is a sculpted hound, and there is a moulded cornice over all. Beyond this is a lower screen wall about 10 metres (33 ft) long containing a Tudor arched doorway, and then a coped garden wall about 15 metres (49 ft) long, ending in a square pier.	II
Rhoads monument 53.69348°N 1.36258°W	—	c. 1660	The monument is in the churchyard of All Saints Church, and is to the memory of Thomas Rhoads. It is in sandstone, and consists of a rectangular monumental slab. The monument has a stylised running vine border, a deep central band with elaborate decoration, and an inscription.	II
Fleeming and Collitt monuments 53.69344°N 1.36270°W	—	c. 1682	The monuments are in the churchyard of All Saints Church, and consist of two rectangular monumental slabs in sandstone. The older slab is to the memory of members of the Collitt family, and has a border of foliated scrolls, continuing round the head as an arched band of primitive gadrooning, with winged angel heads in the spandrels, and an inscription. The other slab, dating from about 1723, is to the memory of Margaret Fleeming. It has a border of trailing vine, an arched head containing raised lettering with a foliated surround, sunk spandrels containing stylised tulips, and an inscription.	II
Potter monument 53.69347°N 1.36238°W	—	c. 1694	The monument is in the churchyard of All Saints Church, and is to the memory of John Potter. It is in sandstone, and consists of a rectangular monumental slab. The monument has a moulded border, and contains a carved achievement of arms, a lower border of arcades and scrolls, and an inscription.	II
Fether monument 53.69345°N 1.36248°W	—	c. 1699	The monument is in the churchyard of All Saints Church, and is to the memory of members of the Fether family. It is in sandstone, and consists of a rectangular monumental slab. The monument has a margin of double incised lines with scrolls in the outer corners, a deep central band with decoration, and an inscription.	II
Jenkinson monument 53.69347°N 1.36296°W	—	c. 1722	The monument is in the churchyard of All Saints Church, and is to the memory of Sarah Jenkinson. It is in sandstone, and consists of a rectangular monumental slab. The monument has a border of raised foliated patterns, a round-arched head on stylised scrolled brackets with winged angel heads in the spandrels, and a short inscription.	II
Cawthorn monument 53.69353°N 1.36277°W	—	c. 1724	The monument is in the churchyard of All Saints Church, and is to the memory of Alvera Cawthorn. It is in sandstone, and consists of a rectangular monumental slab. The monument has a running vine border, a deep central band, decoration, and an inscription.	II
Loscoe Grange; 53.70125°N 1.38548°W	—	Mid 18th century	A house later used for other purposes, it is in red brick with a dentilled cornice and a hipped stone slate roof. There are two storeys and a double-pile plan, consisting of a front range and two rear wings. It has a symmetrical front of five bays, the middle three bays projecting under a pediment, and containing a bay window. There is another bay window in the right bay, and the other windows are sashes. At the rear are three gabled bays.	II
Little Went Bridge; 53.66339°N 1.35607°W	—	1811	The bridge carries Went Lane (B6428 road) over the River Went. It is in sandstone, and consists of a single semicircular arch. The bridge has rusticated voussoirs and keystones, raised bands, parapets, and rectangular terminal piers with rounded copings.	II
Purston Hall; 53.67174°N 1.35141°W		c. 1824	A large house, later used for other purposes, it is in sandstone with sill bands, a moulded cornice, and a hipped slate roof. There are two storeys, a rectangular double-pile plan, the front block with fronts of five and three bays, and service wings on the left. The middle three bays project slightly, and contain a porch and a round-headed doorway with an architrave, imposts, a semicircular fanlight, a moulded cornice, and a low parapet. The windows are sashes. At the rear is a later parallel block with fronts of five and two bays, and at the centre is an open pediment containing the date of 1863.	II
St Thomas' Church; 53.67557°N 1.35609°W		1876–78	The church is in sandstone, it has a roof of green slate with red cockscomb ridging tiles, and is in Early English style. It consists of a nave with a clerestory, north and south aisles, a south porch, and a chancel. The clerestory windows consist of large quatrefoils with short coupled lancets beneath, in the west gable is a rose window, and the other windows are lancets; the east window has three stepped lancets in a recessed arch.	II
