= Ackton =

Hamlet in West Yorkshire, England

Coordinates: 53.692058°N 1.376018°W

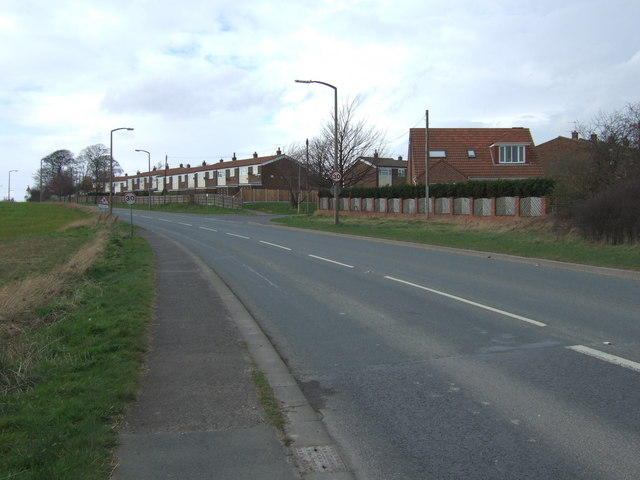

- Location within West Yorkshire
- Civil parish: Featherstone
- Metropolitan borough: Wakefield
- Metropolitan county: West Yorkshire
- Region: Yorkshire and the Humber
- Country: England
- Sovereign state: United Kingdom
- Post town: PONTEFRACT
- Postcode district: WF7
- Dialling code: 01977
- Police: West Yorkshire
- Fire: West Yorkshire
- Ambulance: Yorkshire
- UK Parliament: Hemsworth

Ackton is a hamlet in the parish of Featherstone, in the Wakefield district of West Yorkshire, England. It is near Pontefract. In 1931 the parish had a population of 961.

== History ==
Historically part of the West Riding of Yorkshire, the name "Ackton" means "oak-tree farmstead". It is formed from the Old Scandinavian word eik ("oak-tree") and the Old English word tūn ("farmstead, village, enclosure"). The first element of the name indicates the presence of settlers from Scandinavia in Ackton whose dialect influenced the name of the settlement. Ackton appeared as Aitone [sic] in the Domesday Book of 1086. The village is mentioned again, this time more correctly, c. 1166 as Aicton.

Ackton was a township in the parish of Featherstone, from 1866 Ackton was a civil parish but on 1 April 1938 the parish was abolished and merged with Snydale to form "Ackton and Snydale".
