= Wakefield One =

Building in Wakefield, West Yorkshire, England

Coordinates: 53.684°N 1.503°W

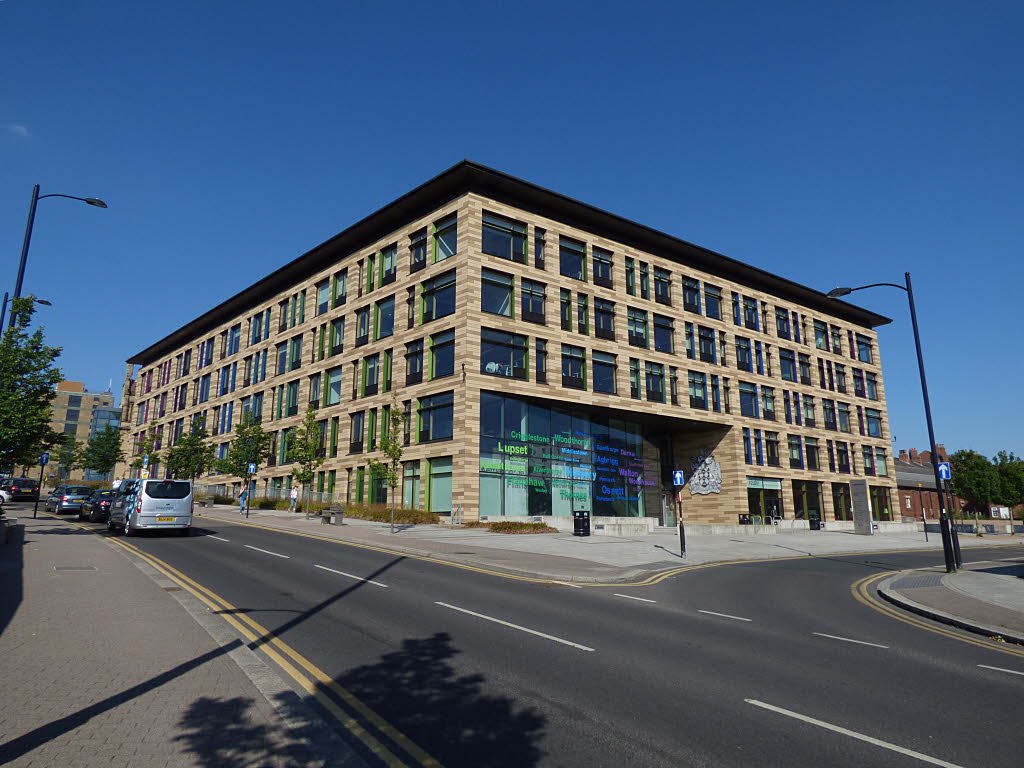
The building, in 2018

Wakefield One is a building in the city centre of Wakefield, a city in West Yorkshire, in England.

The four-storey building was commissioned by Wakefield Council as its headquarters. It was designed by Cartwright Pickard Architects. Work began in August 2010, and the building was completed in January 2012. In addition to the council offices and a one-stop-shop for council services, it also houses Wakefield Museum, the city's central library, and a cafe. The building won the Regional Architect of the Year award.

In 2022, it was announced that the museum and library would move to a new location on Kirkgate.
