= Coat of arms of Wakefield =

- Armiger: Wakefield Metropolitan District Council
- Adopted: 1990
- Motto: Persevere and prosper

The Coat of arms of the Wakefield District was granted in 1990. Between 1974 and 1990, the council did not have arms that represented its governance of the expanded metropolitan district of the City of Wakefield, and used the arms of the County Borough of Wakefield. Arms had been granted to the district's constituent city and towns, (Wakefield, Castleford, Horbury, Knottingley, Ossett and Pontefract) but an application to the College of Arms was made for a unifying achievement.

The shield of the arms has a background of black and gold. The black represents the coal mining industry that was once widespread and important to the district. In the top, left of the shield is the arms of the city of Wakefield. The mural crowns signify Wakefield's important role in governance for the surrounding area.

The compartment shows thirteen acorns which represent the thirteen former local government areas of the West Riding of Yorkshire that merged to form the metropolitan district in 1974. Beneath the compartment is a motto, "Persevere and prosper".

== Arms of the County Borough Council ==
Arms of the former Wakefield City and County Borough Council

The arms used before 1990 had been used in Wakefield for over 500 years. The arms had the simple blazon of "Azure, a fleur-de-lys Or". Despite its history, arms were not officially granted until 1932 when the ermine fimbriation was added. Consequently, the blazon became "Azure, a fleur-de-lys Or fimbriated Ermine".
