= Wakefield Council =

Local authority in West Yorkshire, England

- Third of council elected three years out of four
- Coat of arms

- Council logo

Type
- Type: Metropolitan borough

Leadership
- Mayor: Brian Moorhouse, Reform UK since 20 May 2026
- Leader: Karl Johnson, Reform UK since 12 May 2026
- Chief Executive: Tony Reeves since April 2024

Structure
- Seats: 63 councillors
- Graph of the party split among 63 seats.
- Political groups: Administration (55) Reform (55) Other parties (8) Liberal Democrats (2) Conservative (1) Green (1) Labour (1) SDP (1) Independent (2)
- Joint committees: West Yorkshire Combined Authority

Elections
- Voting system: Multiple member first-past-the-post voting
- Last election: 7 May 2026
- Next election: 6 May 2027

Motto
- Persevere and prosper

Meeting place
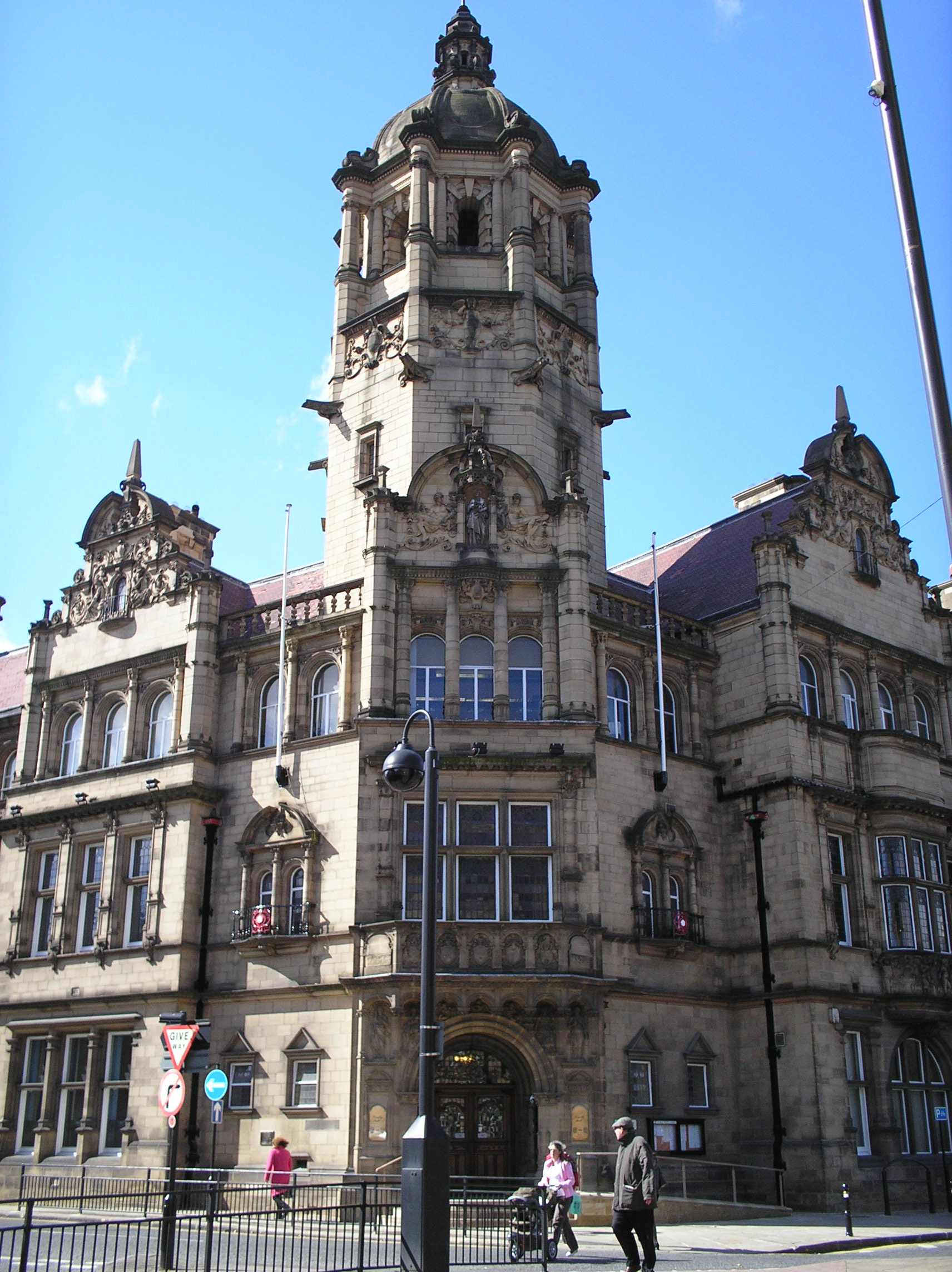
- County Hall, Bond Street, Wakefield, WF1 2QW

Website
- www.wakefield.gov.uk

Wakefield Council, also known as the City of Wakefield Metropolitan District Council, is the local authority of the City of Wakefield in West Yorkshire, England. Wakefield has had a council since 1848, which has been reformed on several occasions. Since 1974 it has been a metropolitan borough council. It provides the majority of local government services in the city. The council has been a member of the West Yorkshire Combined Authority since 2014.

The council has been under Reform UK majority control since the 2026 election. Prior to that, the council had been under Labour majority control from the creation of the modern borough in 1974. It meets at County Hall and has its main offices at Wakefield One.

== History ==
The town of Wakefield had been an ancient borough, with its earliest known charter granted c. 1190. It lost its borough status c. 1580, after which it was governed by its manorial courts and vestry.

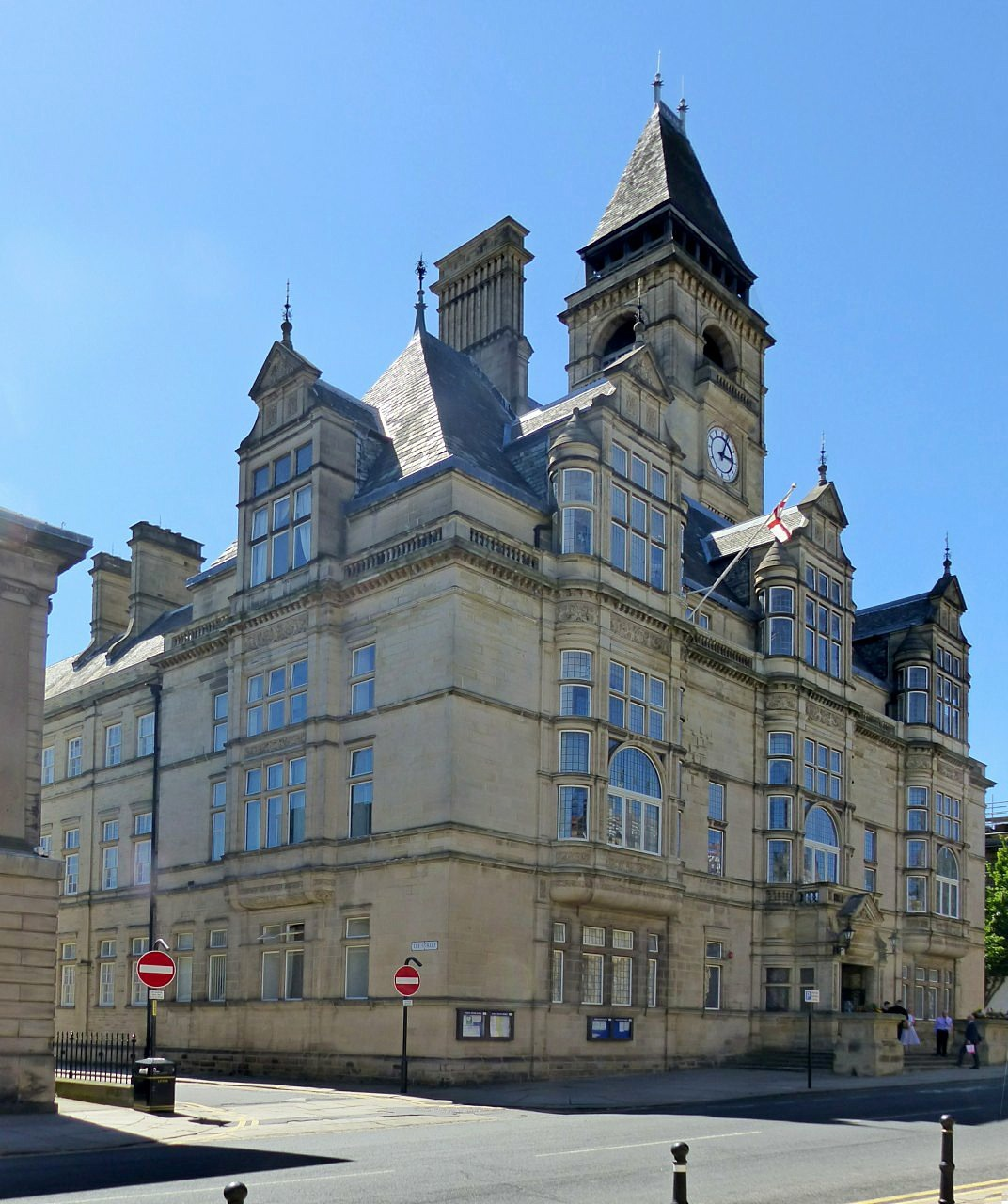
Wakefield Town Hall, Wood Street, completed 1880

A Wakefield parliamentary borough (constituency) was created in 1832. In 1848 the town was also incorporated as a municipal borough, after which it was governed by a body formally called the "mayor, aldermen and burgesses of the borough of Wakefield", generally known as the corporation or town council.

Wakefield was awarded city status in 1888, after which the corporation was also known as the city council. In 1915, Wakefield raised to the status of a county borough, taking on the county-level services previously provided in the city by West Riding County Council.

The larger metropolitan district of Wakefield and its council were created on 1 April 1974 under the Local Government Act 1972. It covered the whole area of eleven former districts and parts of another two, which were all abolished at the same time:

- Castleford Municipal Borough
- Featherstone Urban District
- Hemsworth Rural District (part)
- Hemsworth Urban District
- Horbury Urban District
- Knottingley Urban District
- Normanton Urban District
- Osgoldcross Rural District (parishes of Darrington and East Hardwick only)
- Ossett Municipal Borough
- Pontefract Municipal Borough
- Stanley Urban District
- Wakefield County Borough
- Wakefield Rural District

The new Wakefield district was awarded borough status from its creation, allowing the chair of the council to take the title of mayor, continuing Wakefield's series of mayors dating back to 1848. Wakefield's city status was extended to cover the whole of the new borough. As such the council could call itself "Wakefield City Council", which name is sometimes used for it in official documents and the media. The council now styles itself "Wakefield Council", having previously used the branding "City of Wakefield Metropolitan District Council".

From 1974 until 1986 Wakefield was a district-level authority, with West Yorkshire County Council providing county-level services. The metropolitan county councils, including West Yorkshire County Council, were abolished in 1986 under the Local Government Act 1985. Since 1986 Wakefield Council has therefore been responsible for most local government functions.

In 2004 the district's council housing was transferred to Wakefield and District Housing (WDH), a new independent housing association. Council houses account for around 30% of the district's housing. In April 2025, WDH rebranded to Vico Homes.

The council has been a constituent member of the West Yorkshire Combined Authority since 2014, which has been led by the directly elected Mayor of West Yorkshire since 2021.

== Governance ==
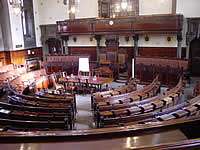
Inside the council chamber

The local authority derives its powers and functions from the Local Government Act 1972 and subsequent legislation. For the purposes of local government, Wakefield is within a metropolitan area of England. As a metropolitan district council, Wakefield Council provides most local government functions directly, including collecting Council Tax and business rates, town planning, housing, waste collection and environmental health, social services, libraries and waste disposal. It is also a local education authority. Wakefield Council is the billing authority for Council Tax, and collects precepts on behalf of the West Yorkshire Police and Crime Commissioner and the West Yorkshire Fire and Civil Defence Authority.

Certain services are provided with the other local authorities in West Yorkshire. The council is represented on West Yorkshire Joint Services Committee (for trading standards, archives, archaeology and grants), West Yorkshire Fire and Civil Defence Authority, West Yorkshire Integrated Transport Authority and the West Yorkshire Police and Crime Panel. Wakefield Council has been a constituent member of the West Yorkshire Combined Authority since 2014.

=== Political control ===
The council has been under Reform UK majority control since the 2026 election.

The first election to the reconstituted council was held in 1973, initially operating as a shadow authority alongside the outgoing authorities until the new arrangements came into effect on 1 April 1974. Labour held a majority of the seats on the council from its creation until the 2026 election.

Party in control	Years
Labour	1974–2026
Reform	2026–present

=== Leadership ===
The role of mayor is largely ceremonial in Wakefield. Political leadership is instead provided by the leader of the council. The leaders since 1998 have been:

Councillor	Party	From	To
Colin Croxall	Labour		24 Jul 1998
Peter Box	Labour	1998	30 Nov 2019
Denise Jeffery	Labour	1 Dec 2019	May 2026
Karl Johnson	Reform	20 May 2026	

=== Composition ===
Following the 2026 election, and subsequent changes of allegiance up to September 2026, the composition of the council was:

Party	Seats
Reform	55
Liberal Democrats	2
Conservative	1
Green	1
Labour	1
SDP	1
Independent	2
Total	63

The next election is due in May 2027.

== Elections ==
Since the last boundary changes in took effect for the 2026 election, the council has comprised 63 councillors representing 21 wards, with each ward electing three councillors. Elections are held in three out of every four years, with a third of the council (one councillor for each ward) elected at a time for a four-year term.

- Ackworth, North Elmsall and Upton
- Airedale and Ferry Fryston
- Altofts and Whitwood
- Castleford Central and Glasshoughton
- Crofton, Ryhill and Walton
- Featherstone
- Hemsworth
- Horbury and South Ossett
- Knottingley and Ferrybridge
- Normanton
- Ossett
- Pontefract North
- Pontefract South
- South Elmsall and South Kirkby
- Stanley and Outwood East
- Wakefield East
- Wakefield North
- Wakefield Rural
- Wakefield South
- Wakefield West
- Wrenthorpe and Outwood West

== Premises ==
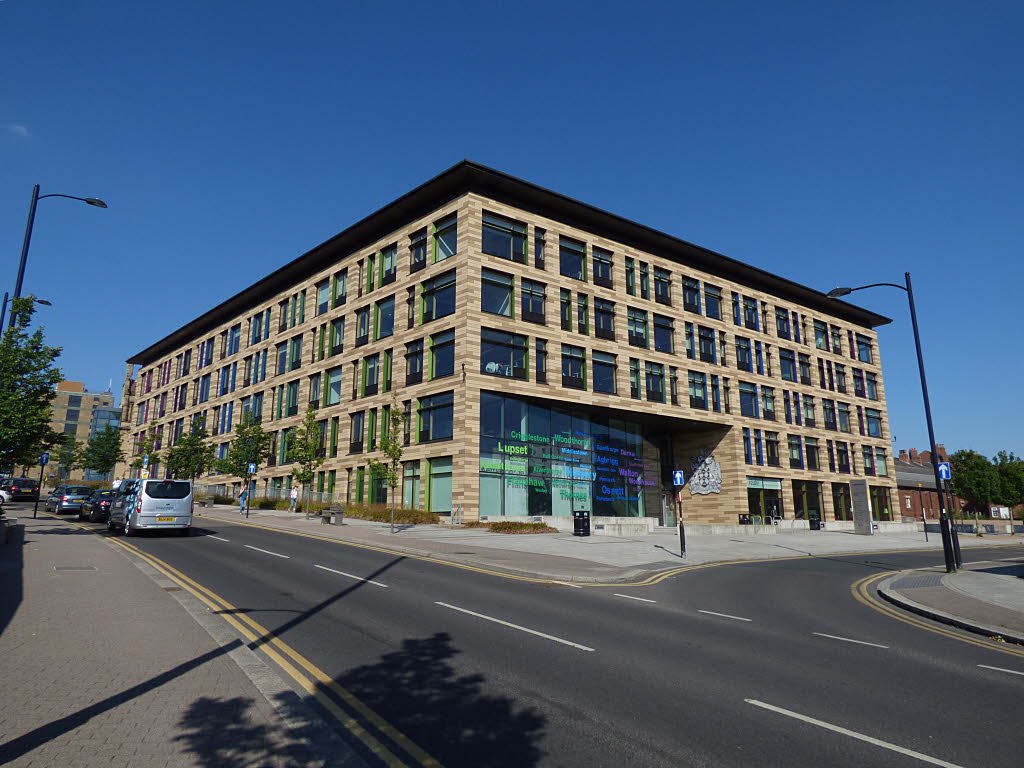
Wakefield One, Burton Street

The council meets at County Hall on Bond Street in Wakefield. The building was completed in 1898 as the headquarters of the former West Riding County Council, and subsequently served as the headquarters of West Yorkshire County Council between 1974 and 1986. Following the abolition of West Yorkshire County Council in 1986 the building was acquired by Wakefield Council. County Hall is a Grade I listed building.

The council has its main offices and customer services centre in the nearby Wakefield One building on Burton Street, which was completed in 2012 and also houses the city's main library.

Wakefield Town Hall on Wood Street is also used for some meetings and offices. It was completed in 1880 and served as the main headquarters of Wakefield's council through its various iterations until the modern council's acquisition of County Hall in 1987.

== Former logos ==
Former logos of Wakefield Metropolitan District Council
A rubbish bin in Wakefield city centre showing the former logo of the council

A sign in south Wakefield depicting the former council logo and branding

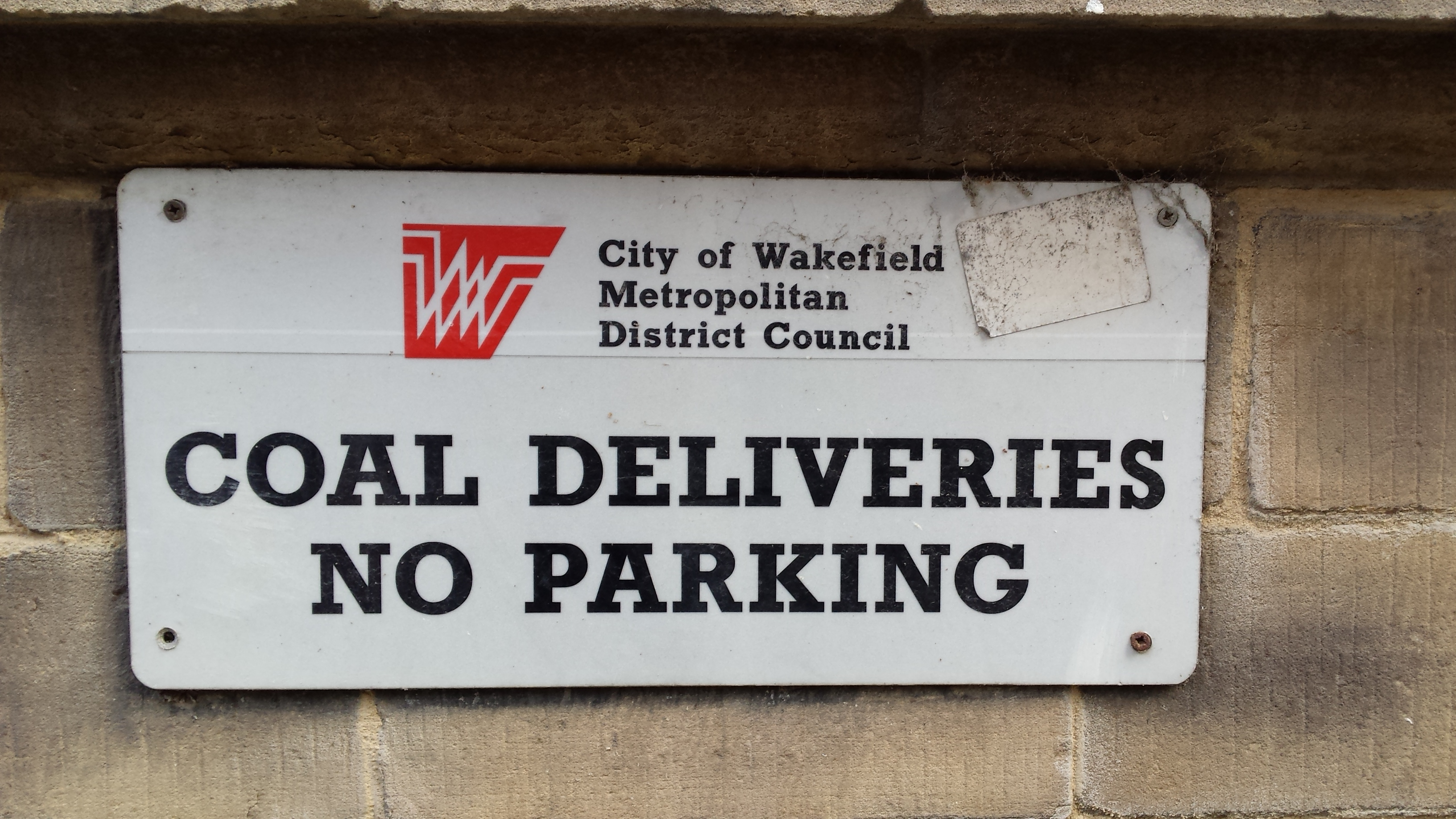
This sign found attached on Wakefield Town Hall shows the former logo and branding
