= 2026 Wakefield Council election =

2026 English local government election

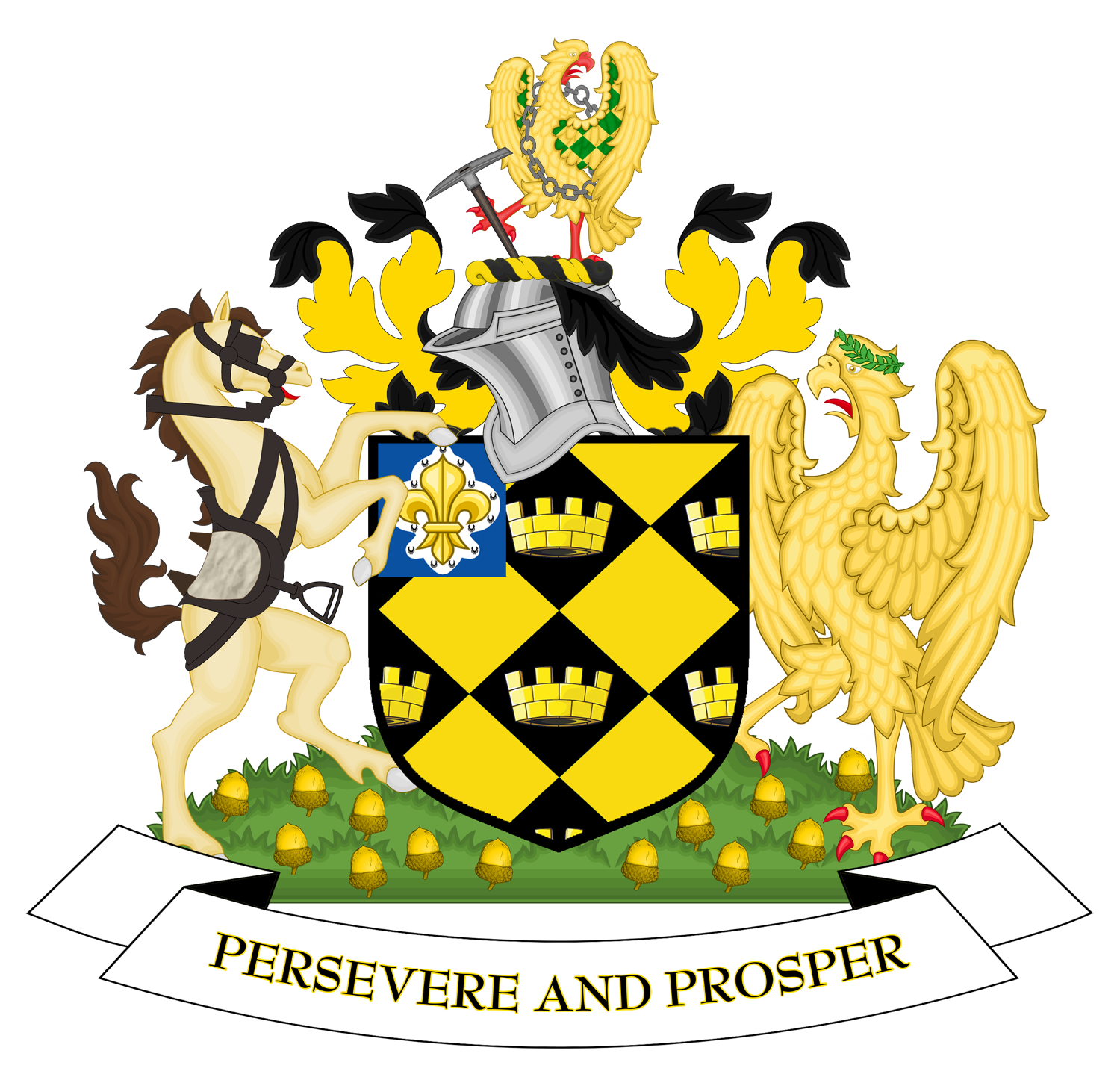
- 7 May 2026

All 63 seats to Wakefield Council 32 seats needed for a majority
- Registered: 268,824
- Turnout: 98,402; 36.6%

	First party	Second party	Third party
Leader	Karl Johnson	Rachel Speak
Party	Reform	Liberal Democrats	Conservative
Leader's seat	Stanley and Outwood East	Knottingley and Ferrybridge
Last election	0 seats, 1.4%	3 seats, 3.1%	3 seats, 18.8%
Seats before	2	2	1
Seats after	58	2	1
Seat change	▲58	▼1	▼2
	Fourth party	Fifth party	Sixth party
Leader		Denise Jeffrey	Jakob Williamson (Note: Leader of the Unity Independents group.)
Party	Green	Labour	Unity Independents
Leader's seat		Castleford Central and Glasshoughton (defeated)	Hemsworth (defeated)
Last election	0 seats, 12.2%	56 seats, 53.9%	1 seat, 0.4%
Seats before	1	49	8 (Note: Of the 8 Independent councillors before the election, 4 sat in the Unity group, 1 sat in the Conservative & Independent Group, and 3 were non-aligned.)
Seats after	1	1	0
Seat change	▲1	▼55	▼8
- Winner of each seat at the 2026 Wakefield Council election
Leader before election
Denise Jeffrey
Labour
Leader after election
Karl Johnson
Reform

The 2026 Wakefield Council election was held on 7 May 2026, alongside the other local elections across the United Kingdom being held on the same day. All 63 members of Wakefield Council were elected.

Prior to the election, the council had been under Labour majority control since the council's creation in 1974. At this election, Reform UK won 58 of the 63 seats on the council, giving them a sizeable majority. The incumbent Labour leader of the council, Denise Jeffrey, lost her seat. After the election, Reform chose Karl Johnson to be its new group leader. He was formally appointed as the new leader of the council at the subsequent annual council meeting on 20 May 2026.

== Background ==
In 2024, Labour retained control of the council. Following ward boundary changes, all 63 seats on the council were up for election.

== Council composition ==
After 2024 election		Before 2026 election (Note: Last updated 11 February 2026.)	
Party	Seats	Party	Seats
Labour	56	Labour	48
Liberal Democrats	3	Liberal Democrats	2
Reform	0	Reform	2
Conservative	3	Conservative	1
Green	0	Green	1
Independent	1	Independent	9

Changes 2024–2026:

- October 2024: Graham Isherwood (Labour) dies – by-election held December 2024
- December 2024: Scott Haslam (Labour) wins by-election
- March 2025: Pete Girt (Liberal Democrats) leaves party to sit as an independent
- April 2025: Jakob Williamson (Labour) leaves party to sit as an independent
- May 2025: Stan Bates (Labour) leaves party to sit as an independent
- June 2025:
  - Michael Graham (Labour) and Kevin Swift (Labour) leave party to sit as an independent
  - Nick Farmer (Conservative) joins Reform
- September 2025:
  - Martin Roberts (Labour) leaves party to sit as an independent
  - Olivia Rowley (Labour) suspended from party
- January 2026:
  - Samantha Harvey (Conservative) joins Reform
- March 2026:
  - Nadiah Sharp (Independent) joins the Green Party
  - Steve Tulley (Labour) leaves party to sit as an independent
  - Shabaan Selim (Labour) leaves the party to sit as an independent

== Election results ==
2026 Wakefield Metropolitan District Council election
Party	Candidates	Seats	Gains	Losses	Net gain/loss	Seats %	Votes %	Votes	+/−
Reform	63	58	58	0	▲58	92.1	44.4	122,998	▲43.0
Liberal Democrats	27	2	0	1	▼1	3.2	4.2	11,616	▲1.1
Labour	63	1	0	56	▼56	1.6	25.9	71,644	▼28.0
Green	62	1	1	0	▲1	1.6	13.0	35,922	▲0.8
Conservative	42	1	0	2	▼2	1.6	8.0	22,194	▼10.8
Independent	10	0	0	0	Steady	0.0	1.8	5,107	N/A
Unity Independents	7	0	0	0	Steady	0.0	1.4	3,746	N/A
Wakefield Independents	3	0	0	0	Steady	0.0	1.0	2,761	▼4.3
TUSC	4	0	0	0	Steady	0.0	0.1	299	▼0.5
Yorkshire	1	0	0	0	Steady	0.0	0.1	275	▼4.0
SDP	2	0	0	0	Steady	0.0	0.1	211	N/A
British Democrats	1	0	0	0	Steady	0.0	0.0	100	N/A

== Ward results ==
=== Ackworth, North Elmsall and Upton ===
Ackworth, North Elmsall and Upton
Party	Candidate	Votes	%	±%
Reform	Rhys Lawrence Paul Carr	2,244	45.3	
Reform	Kevin Atcheson	2,165	43.7	
Reform	Chad Jordan Thomas	2,040	41.2	
Labour	Jessica Louise Carrington	1,179	23.8	
Labour	Laura Jones	1,062	21.5	
Labour	Anne Moran	970	19.6	
Green	Yvette Amanda Dorothy McKinney	818	16.5	
Green	Charles Patrick McKinney	757	15.3	
Green	Incy Wood	710	14.3	
Conservative	Daniel Wrightson	569	11.5	
Liberal Democrats	John Brian Walker	409	8.3	
Independent	Raymond Massey	371	7.5	
Independent	David Pointon	270	5.5	
Independent	Ayrton Pointon	256	5.2	
Turnout		4,965	37.2	
Rejected ballots		14		
Registered electors		13,343		
Reform gain from Labour		Swing		
Reform gain from Labour		Swing		
Reform gain from Labour		Swing		

=== Airedale and Ferry Fryston ===
Airedale and Ferry Fryston
Party	Candidate	Votes	%	±%
Reform	Carrie Louise Gledhill	1,877	54.2	
Reform	Adam James Freer	1,859	53.6	
Reform	Dion Lowe	1,781	51.4	
Labour	Jackie Ferguson	1,009	29.1	
Labour	Kathryn Scott	970	28.0	
Labour	Daniel James Campbell	966	27.9	
Green	Gemma Louise Herron	408	11.8	
Green	Daniel Mark Russell	333	9.6	
Green	Jake Edward Leech	327	9.4	
Conservative	Eamonn Malachy Mullins	268	7.7	
Turnout		3,475	28.8	
Rejected ballots		9		
Registered electors		12,065		
Reform gain from Labour		Swing		
Reform gain from Labour		Swing		
Reform gain from Labour		Swing		

=== Altofts & Whitwood ===
Altofts & Whitwood
Party	Candidate	Votes	%	±%
Reform	Michelle Keeley	2,521	50.6	
Reform	John Robert Thomas	2,439	48.9	
Reform	Jamie McGrevy	2,425	48.7	
Labour	Jo Hepworth	1,423	28.6	
Labour	Mark Anthony Jennings	1,322	26.5	
Labour	Josie Pritchard	1,269	25.5	
Green	Skyler Millie Newman	682	13.7	
Green	Mark Knight Pedlar	636	12.8	
Green	Janet Mackintosh	628	12.6	
Conservative	Doreen Smart	470	9.4	
Liberal Democrats	Donna Marie Greenwood	319	6.4	
Turnout		4,993	35.2	
Rejected ballots		10		
Registered electors		14,169		
Reform gain from Labour		Swing		
Reform gain from Labour		Swing		
Reform gain from Labour		Swing		

=== Castleford Central and Glasshoughton ===
Castleford Central and Glasshoughton
Party	Candidate	Votes	%	±%
Reform	Sandra Drake	1,961	47.0	
Reform	Mike Forrester	1,949	46.7	
Reform	Brett Stephen Muscroft	1,923	46.1	
Labour	Denise Margaret Jeffery	1,357	32.5	
Labour	Claire Michelle Lee	1,202	28.8	
Labour	Joseph Anthony Sunderland	1,127	27.0	
Green	Matthew Chambers	562	13.5	
Green	Fiona Christian Harkin	537	12.9	
Green	Rob Michael Moore	475	11.4	
Conservative	Joanne Grace Smart	338	8.1	
Liberal Democrats	Sheila Betha Ann Atha	298	7.1	
Turnout		4,184	31.5	
Rejected ballots		14		
Registered electors		13,264		
Reform gain from Labour		Swing		
Reform gain from Labour		Swing		
Reform gain from Labour		Swing		

=== Crofton, Ryhill and Walton ===
Crofton, Ryhill and Walton
Party	Candidate	Votes	%	±%
Reform	Penny Ashton	2,447	47.0	
Reform	Steven Ashton	2,355	45.3	
Reform	Bev Watkins	2,192	42.1	
Labour	Maureen Anne Cummings	1,860	35.8	
Labour	Usman Ali	1,455	28.0	
Labour	Dwain Jon Longley	1,219	23.4	
Conservative	Connor Clayton	639	12.3	
Green	Niall Lewis Davison	599	11.5	
Green	Garry Newby	551	10.6	
Green	Matthew James Small	507	9.7	
Conservative	Felistas Ruzvidzo	398	7.7	
Liberal Democrats	Kevin McLennan	336	6.5	
Turnout		5,211	42.7	
Rejected ballots		9		
Registered electors		12,218		
Reform gain from Labour		Swing		
Reform gain from Labour		Swing		
Reform gain from Labour		Swing		

=== Featherstone ===
Featherstone
Party	Candidate	Votes	%	±%
Reform	James Mulligan	2,068	49.9	
Reform	Jacob Padget	1,882	45.4	
Reform	Gilly Womack	1,841	44.4	
Labour	Maureen Tennant-King	1,341	32.3	
Labour	Scott Haslam	1,265	30.5	
Labour	Steve Vickers	1,238	29.9	
Green	Josie Cottam	481	11.6	
Green	Julie Zoe Nicholson	462	11.1	
Green	Samuel Thomas Lee	391	9.4	
Conservative	Scott Stephen Broadbent	336	8.1	
Liberal Democrats	Benjamin Alexander Strutt	225	5.4	
Turnout		4,158	31.3	
Rejected ballots		11		
Registered electors		13,298		
Reform gain from Labour		Swing		
Reform gain from Labour		Swing		
Reform gain from Labour		Swing		

=== Hemsworth ===
Hemsworth
Party	Candidate	Votes	%	±%
Reform	Matthew Richard Caton	1,609	45.7	
Reform	Heidi Craig	1,604	45.6	
Reform	Joanne Chambers	1,443	41.0	
Labour	Carol Pearl Appleyard	743	21.1	
Labour	Pauline Ann Kitching	695	19.7	
Labour	Robert White	599	17.0	
Unity Independents	Dean James Darley	549	15.6	
Unity Independents	Jakob Matthew Williamson	522	14.8	
Independent	Dale Dixon	508	14.4	
Green	Nichola Greenwood	417	11.8	
Green	Nick Dodd	385	10.9	
Independent	Peter Hardacre	280	8.0	
Conservative	Keith Hudson	162	4.6	
Liberal Democrats	Michael Padgett	159	4.5	
TUSC	Michael James Johnson	69	2.0	
Turnout		3,524	29.3	
Rejected ballots		5		
Registered electors		12,041		
Reform gain from Labour		Swing		
Reform gain from Labour		Swing		
Reform gain from Labour		Swing		

=== Horbury and South Ossett ===
Horbury and South Ossett
Party	Candidate	Votes	%	±%
Reform	Julian Paul Carter	2,131	41.3	
Reform	Teresa Dytor	1,995	38.7	
Reform	Ian Johnson	1,993	38.6	
Labour Co-op	Darren Byford	1,915	37.1	
Labour Co-op	Deb Nicholls	1,495	29.0	
Labour Co-op	Gwen Page	1,370	26.5	
Green	Andrew John Amoss	600	11.6	
Conservative	Neil Edwards	535	10.4	
Green	Richard Hargreaves Norris	494	9.6	
Green	Joseph Michael Stephen Tebay	468	9.1	
Conservative	Tommy Oliver Hartley	461	8.9	
Conservative	Margaret Woolmer	459	8.9	
Liberal Democrats	Izabela Bielecka	306	5.9	
Unity Independents	Lisa Margaret Deighton	275	5.3	
Liberal Democrats	Janet Walton	197	3.8	
Liberal Democrats	Andrew Hevered Mark Scaife	156	3.0	
Turnout		5,169	44.1	
Rejected ballots		8		
Registered electors		11,722		
Reform gain from Labour		Swing		
Reform gain from Labour		Swing		
Reform gain from Labour		Swing		

=== Knottingley and Ferrybridge ===
Knottingley and Ferrybridge
Party	Candidate	Votes	%	±%
Reform	William Garbutt	1,502	43.1	
Liberal Democrats	Adele Hayes	1,430	41.1	
Liberal Democrats	Rachel Speak	1,425	40.9	
Reform	Lisa Marie Frost	1,392	40.0	
Reform	David Paul Kennedy	1,339	38.4	
Liberal Democrats	Sharon Diane Rutter	1,231	35.3	
Labour Co-op	Robin John Gledhill	335	9.6	
Labour Co-op	Craig Tildesley	325	9.3	
Labour Co-op	Tony Wallis	263	7.6	
Green	Hollie Ann Coysh	240	6.9	
Green	Laura Strickland	218	6.3	
Green	Charlotte Kimberley Mae Hirst	203	5.8	
Conservative	Larissa McCormick	105	3.0	
Turnout		3,488	32.1	
Rejected ballots		5		
Registered electors		10,866		
Reform gain from Liberal Democrats		Swing		
Liberal Democrats hold		Swing		
Liberal Democrats hold		Swing		

=== Normanton ===
Normanton
Party	Candidate	Votes	%	±%
Reform	Cliff Parsons	1,880	42.6	
Reform	Steven Sylvester Lewis	1,792	40.6	
Reform	Lukasz Borcz	1,615	36.6	
Labour	Daniel Wilton	1,333	30.2	
Labour	Julie Medford	1,293	29.3	
Labour	Alison Bones	1,033	23.4	
Wakefield Independents	Eugene Reynolds	912	20.7	
Green	Archie Thomas Daniel	507	11.5	
Independent	Sue Sharpe-Martin	472	10.7	
Green	Rebecca Louise Thomas	403	9.1	
Green	John Robert Clayton	364	8.2	
Conservative	Abraham Ceesay	277	6.3	
Liberal Democrats	Adam James Belcher	258	5.8	
Turnout		4,422	34.6	
Rejected ballots		6		
Registered electors		12,782		
Reform gain from Labour		Swing		
Reform gain from Labour		Swing		
Reform gain from Labour		Swing		

=== Ossett ===
Ossett
Party	Candidate	Votes	%	±%
Reform	Nick Farmer	2,394	16.3	
Reform	David Hunter	2,233	15.2	
Reform	Brian Moorhouse	2,086	14.2	
Labour	Andy Freeman	1,307	8.9	
Labour	Dave Evans	1,242	8.5	
Labour	Duncan Smith	1,219	8.3	
Conservative	Luke Smith	1,000	6.8	
Conservative	James William Armitage	590	4.0	
Green	Samuel Jason Robinson	478	3.3	
Green	Stephen Scott	469	3.2	
Green	Guy Richard Thomas	447	3.0	
Conservative	Timothy Woolmer	428	2.9	
Wakefield Independents	Tony John Homewood	351	2.4	
Liberal Democrats	Leah Hayes Birdsall	275	1.9	
SDP	Christine Ellis	151	1.0	
Reform gain from Conservative		Swing		
Reform gain from Labour		Swing		
Reform gain from Labour		Swing		

=== Pontefract North ===
Pontefract North
Party	Candidate	Votes	%	±%
Reform	Jordan Bedford	2,002	16.5	
Reform	Christopher Dawson	1,975	16.3	
Reform	Craig Smith	1,885	15.5	
Labour	Hannah Ruth Appleyard	1,399	11.5	
Labour	Helen Kirsty Antcliff	1,210	10.0	
Labour	Clive Malcolm Tennant	1,160	9.6	
Green	Stuart John Atkinson	690	5.7	
Green	Katherine-Alice James	522	4.3	
Green	Alexander John Wood	477	3.9	
Conservative	Pepe Ruzvidzo	321	2.6	
Liberal Democrats	Richard John Heaps	302	2.5	
Liberal Democrats	Dan Woodlock	199	1.6	
Reform gain from Labour		Swing		
Reform gain from Labour		Swing		
Reform gain from Labour		Swing		

=== Pontefract South ===
Pontefract South
Party	Candidate	Votes	%	±%
Reform	Philip Booth	2,206	14.9	
Reform	Keith Christian Anderson	2,188	14.7	
Reform	Michael Thomas Livsey	2,081	14.0	
Labour	George Alexander Ayre	1,750	11.8	
Labour	Julie Anne Craig	1,616	10.9	
Labour	Brian Mayhew	1,480	10.0	
Conservative	Jack Lewis Crosswaite	631	4.3	
Green	Stephen James Brennan	559	3.8	
Conservative	Jonathan Alan Crosswaite	558	3.8	
Conservative	Peter Sutherland Forster	542	3.7	
Green	Dick Davies	472	3.2	
Green	Jaspal Singh Mundh	412	2.8	
Liberal Democrats	Susan Hayes	262	1.8	
TUSC	John Gill	80	0.5	
Reform gain from Labour		Swing		
Reform gain from Labour		Swing		
Reform gain from Labour		Swing		

=== South Elmsall and South Kirkby ===
South Elmsall and South Kirkby
Party	Candidate	Votes	%	±%
Reform	Matthew James Pinder	2,253	20.0	
Reform	David Andrew Pringle	1,936	17.1	
Reform	James Crashley	1,806	16.0	
Independent	Steve Tulley	1,401	12.4	
Labour	Michelle Louise Collins	1,244	11.0	
Labour	Geoffrey Peter Davis	550	4.9	
Labour	Ann Marie Maguire	514	4.6	
Green	Paul Anthony Hayes	426	3.8	
Green	Stefan Ludewig	383	3.4	
Green	Trevor Zia	282	2.5	
Unity Independents	Stan Bates	176	1.6	
Conservative	Jean Foster	173	1.5	
Liberal Democrats	Craig Andrew Smith	149	1.3	
Reform gain from Labour		Swing		
Reform gain from Labour		Swing		
Reform gain from Labour		Swing		

=== Stanley and Outwood East ===
Stanley and Outwood East
Party	Candidate	Votes	%	±%
Reform	Karl Johnson	2,490	15.1	
Reform	John Alan Evans	2,363	14.3	
Reform	Geoffrey Ian Johnston	2,246	13.6	
Labour	Matthew Morley	2,004	12.1	
Labour	Jack Spencer Hemingway	1,739	10.5	
Labour	Lynn Masterman	1,651	10.0	
Green	Kathleen Rose Beels	766	4.6	
Green	Richard David Copeland	671	4.1	
Conservative	Richard Martin Wakefield	660	4.0	
Green	Joseph Gosling	562	3.4	
Conservative	Jane Louise Garfit	527	3.2	
Conservative	Kenneth Stewart Sanderson	488	3.0	
Liberal Democrats	Natasha Marie De Vere	364	2.2	
Reform gain from Labour		Swing		
Reform gain from Labour		Swing		
Reform gain from Labour		Swing		

=== Wakefield East ===
Wakefield East
Party	Candidate	Votes	%	±%
Labour	Yubi Ayub	1,241	10.3	
Reform	Steve Parker	1,169	9.7	
Reform	Wayne Beddoes	1,161	9.6	
Reform	Ste Pritchard	1,122	9.3	
Labour	Charlie Boyes	957	7.9	
Labour	Nat Walton	957	7.9	
Unity Independents	Yasar Ahmed	906	7.5	
Unity Independents	Rabina Kouser Khan	760	6.3	
Green	Nadiah Sharp	685	5.7	
Green	Jody Paul Gabriel	683	5.6	
Unity Independents	Safia Ilyas	558	4.6	
Green	Sid Ullah	494	4.1	
Independent	Shabaan Saleem	384	3.2	
Conservative	David Antony Young	269	2.2	
Conservative	Peter Mott	262	2.2	
Conservative	Khadija Formuli	226	1.9	
Liberal Democrats	Michael Junior Mateta	151	1.2	
TUSC	Mick Griffiths	104	0.9	
Labour hold		Swing		
Reform gain from Labour		Swing		
Reform gain from Labour		Swing		

=== Wakefield North ===
Wakefield North
Party	Candidate	Votes	%	±%
Reform	Andrew Wakefield	1,466	12.2	
Green	Kate Dodd	1,415	11.7	
Reform	Troy David Moxon	1,412	11.7	
Green	Olli Watkins	1,370	11.4	
Reform	Magdalena Ewa Suplatowicz	1,356	11.3	
Green	Ashton Victor Howick	1,347	11.2	
Labour	David Pickersgill	827	6.9	
Labour	Margaret Isherwood	815	6.8	
Labour	Elizabeth Rhodes	777	6.5	
Conservative	Hassan Raza	392	3.3	
Conservative	Christopher Ralph Cowton	281	2.3	
Conservative	Matt Cappleman	279	2.3	
Liberal Democrats	Tony Sargeant	160	1.3	
British Democrats	Keith Sharp	100	0.8	
TUSC	Tom Cullen Griffiths	46	0.4	
Reform gain from Labour		Swing		
Green gain from Labour		Swing		
Reform gain from Labour		Swing		

=== Wakefield Rural ===
Wakefield Rural
Party	Candidate	Votes	%	±%
Reform	James Lee Johnston	2,751	15.2	
Reform	Rebecca Webster	2,700	14.9	
Reform	Ansar Hayat	2,467	13.6	
Conservative	Arnie Craven	1,232	6.8	
Conservative	Nathan Garbutt-Moore	1,126	6.2	
Labour	Ebony Ceesay	1,046	5.8	
Labour	Nick Clews	1,043	5.8	
Conservative	Naeem Formuli	991	5.5	
Labour	Andy Nicholls	966	5.3	
Liberal Democrats	Mark Andrew Goodair	696	3.8	
Liberal Democrats	David John Rowntree Herdson	694	3.8	
Liberal Democrats	Mark Simon Lord	649	3.6	
Green	David Greenwood	598	3.3	
Green	Brett Barry Conway	566	3.1	
Green	Finn Newton	499	2.8	
SDP	Damien Paul Sharpe	60	0.3	
Reform gain from Conservative		Swing		
Reform gain from Labour		Swing		
Reform gain from Labour		Swing		

=== Wakefield South ===
Wakefield South
Party	Candidate	Votes	%	±%
Reform	Ian Fletcher	1,691	11.5	
Reform	Cliff Gurdin	1,595	10.8	
Conservative	Nadeem Ahmed	1,586	10.8	
Reform	Reece Marlow	1,575	10.7	
Conservative	James Robert Hardwick	1,099	7.5	
Labour	Charles Peter Hugh Elliott	1,091	7.4	
Conservative	Jeremy Charles Lunn	1,023	6.9	
Labour	Alexander Mark Ely	987	6.7	
Labour	Adrian Wilson	970	6.6	
Green	Paul William Belbin	944	6.4	
Green	Karen Sadler	863	5.9	
Green	Krys Tal Holmes	758	5.1	
Liberal Democrats	Timothy James Robinson	286	1.9	
Yorkshire	Dan Cochran	275	1.9	
Reform gain from Labour		Swing		
Reform gain from Labour		Swing		
Conservative hold		Swing		

=== Wakefield West ===
Wakefield West
Party	Candidate	Votes	%	±%
Reform	Samantha Harvey	1,886	15.6	
Reform	Paul Jackson	1,735	14.3	
Reform	Gareth Thomas	1,733	14.3	
Labour	Hilary Gail Mitchell	1,048	8.7	
Labour	Ashfaq Ahmed	941	7.8	
Independent	Michael Paul Graham	929	7.7	
Labour	James Yearsley	855	7.1	
Green	Georgina Lucy Ann Darling	631	5.2	
Green	Laura Jane Towle	582	4.8	
Green	Marcella Chietti	575	4.8	
Conservative	Allan Couch	359	3.0	
Conservative	Keith Taylor	318	2.6	
Conservative	John Stefan Higson	298	2.5	
Liberal Democrats	Jack Ramsey	207	1.7	
Reform gain from Labour		Swing		
Reform gain from Labour		Swing		
Reform gain from Labour		Swing		

=== Wrenthorpe and Outwood West ===
Wrenthorpe and Outwood West
Party	Candidate	Votes	%	±%
Reform	David Alan Dews	2,457	15.3	
Reform	Graham John Ridler	2,182	13.6	
Reform	Ian Sheldrake	2,132	13.3	
Wakefield Independents	Nic Stansby	1,498	9.3	
Labour	Charlie Keith	1,223	7.6	
Labour	Brendan James Fraser	1,167	7.3	
Labour	Mike King	1,015	6.3	
Green	Andrew Johnson	820	5.1	
Green	Ruth Alexandra Love	703	4.4	
Conservative	Elizabeth Dunn Cownton	639	4.0	
Green	Anne Marie Pedlar	610	3.8	
Liberal Democrats	Anthony Patrick Campbell De Vere	473	2.9	
Conservative	Vivien Mott	457	2.9	
Conservative	Gareth Shanks	422	2.6	
Independent	Martyn Johnson	236	1.5	
Reform gain from Labour		Swing		
Reform gain from Labour		Swing		
Reform gain from Labour		Swing		
