= Kirklees Council elections =

Kirklees Council is the local authority for the metropolitan borough of Kirklees in West Yorkshire, England. Since the last boundary changes in 2004, the council has comprised 69 councillors representing 23 wards. Elections are held three years out of four, with one third of the councillors (one for each ward) elected each time for a four-year term.

== Council elections ==
Election	Labour	Conservative	Lib Dems/Liberal	Reform	Green	Independent	Other	Control
1973	42	17	8	0	0	1	0	Labour
1975	36	28	7	0	0	1	0	Labour hold
1976	25	50	9	0	0	0	0	Conservative gain from Labour
1978	15	48	9	0	0	0	0	Conservative hold
1979	32	35	5	0	0	0	0	Conservative lose to no overall control
1980	44	25	3	0	0	0	0	Labour gain from no overall control
1982	37	19	12	0	0	0	4	Labour hold
1983	37	20	12	0	0	0	3	Labour hold
1984	37	18	14	0	0	0	3	Labour hold
1986	36	18	17	0	0	1	0	Labour hold
1987	33	21	18	0	0	0	0	Labour lose to no overall control
1988	33	23	15	0	0	1	0	No overall control
1990	45	15	12	0	0	0	0	Labour gain from no overall control
1992	41	19	10	0	0	2	0	Labour hold
1994	35	21	15	0	0	1	0	Labour lose to no overall control
1995	40	16	14	0	0	2	0	Labour gain from no overall control
1996	45	6	18	0	1	1	1 vacancy	Labour hold
1998	43	7	20	0	2	0	0	Labour hold
1999	36	10	23	0	3	0	0	Labour lose to no overall control
2000	25	15	29	0	3	0	0	No overall control
2002	26	15	28	0	3	0	0	No overall control
2003	22	16	31	0	3	0	0	No overall control
2004	17	22	25	0	3	1	1	No overall control
2006	20	21	20	0	3	1	4	No overall control
2007	22	20	18	0	4	1	4	No overall control
2008	22	21	19	0	4	0	3	No overall control
2010	24	19	20	0	4	2	0	No overall control
2011	27	21	14	0	4	3	0	No overall control
2012	32	18	10	0	5	4	0	No overall control
2014	32	18	10	0	5	4	0	No overall control
2015	34	18	10	0	4	3	0	No overall control
2016	34	20	9	0	3	3	0	No overall control
2018	36	20	7	0	3	3	0	Labour gain from no overall control
2019	35	17	10	0	3	4	0	Labour hold
2021	33	19	9	0	3	3	2 (Note: 1 Heavy Woollen District Independents and 1 Dewsbury Borough Independents.)	Labour lose to no overall control
2022	36	18	8	0	3	4	0	Labour gain from no overall control
2023	39	18	8	0	3	1	0	Labour hold
2024	31	15	10	0	4	9	0	Labour lose to no overall control
2026	0	9	5	29	12	14	0	No overall control

== District result maps ==
2004 results map

2006 results map

2007 results map

2008 results map

2010 results map

2011 results map

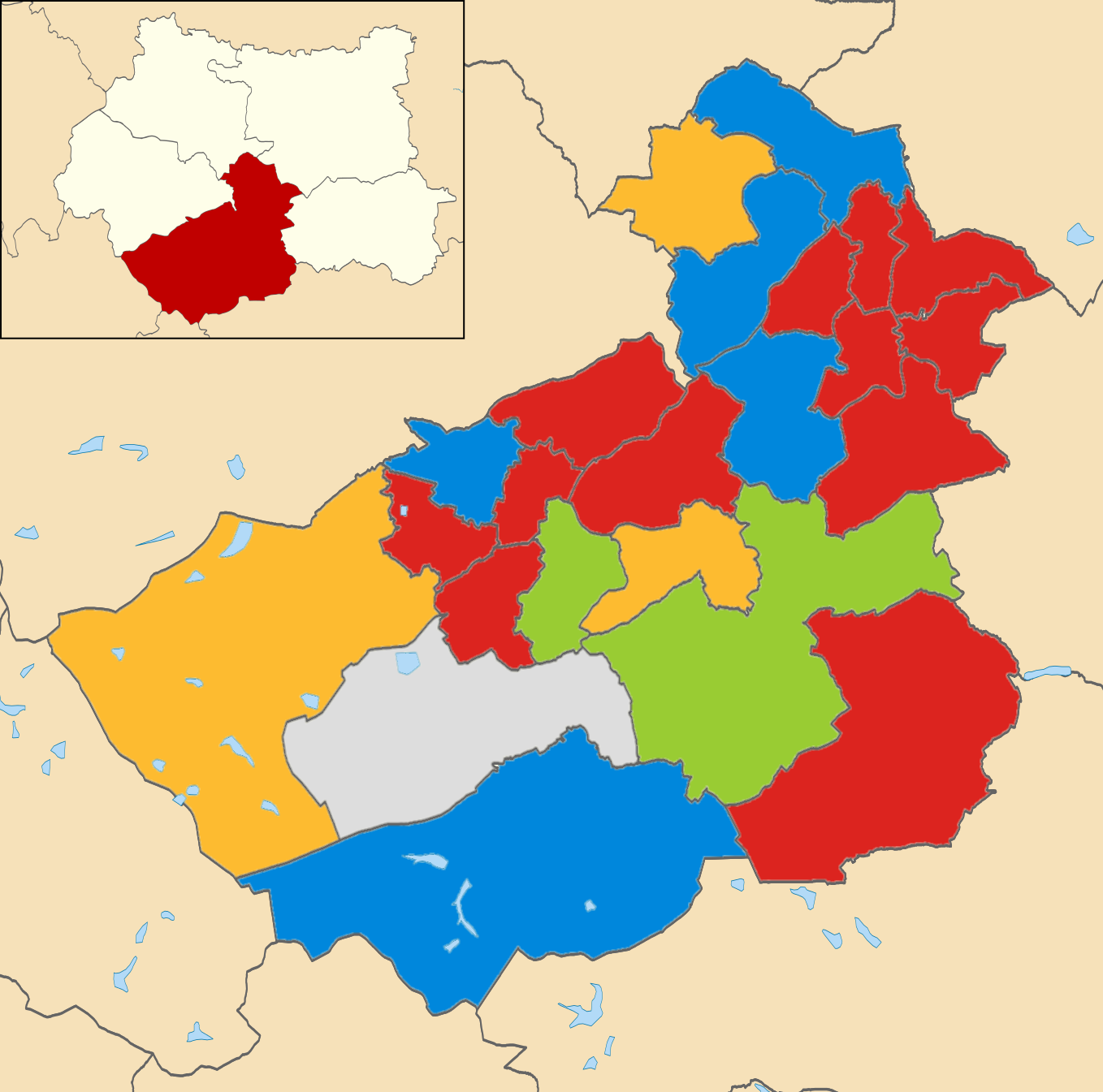
2012 results map

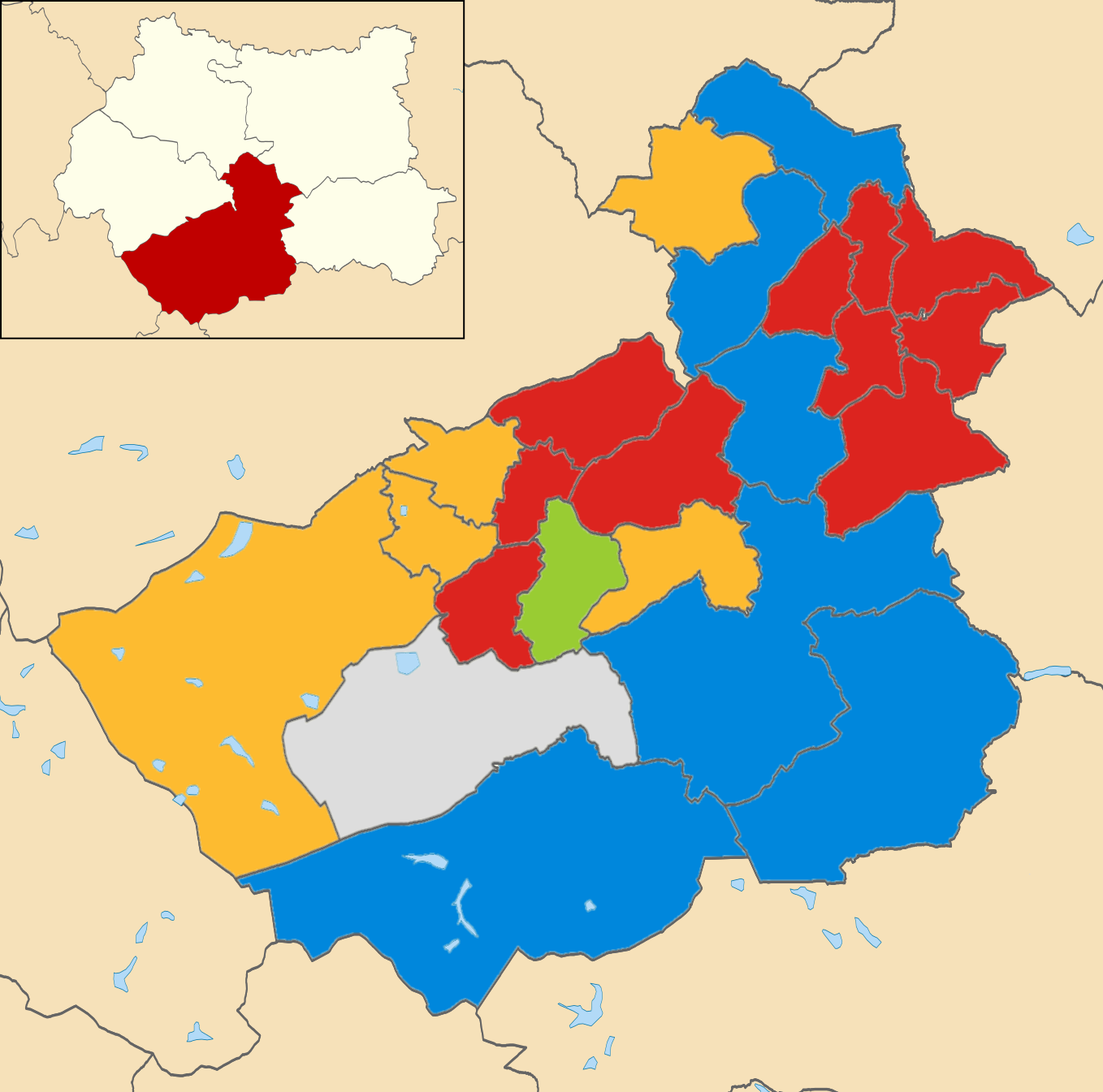
2014 results map

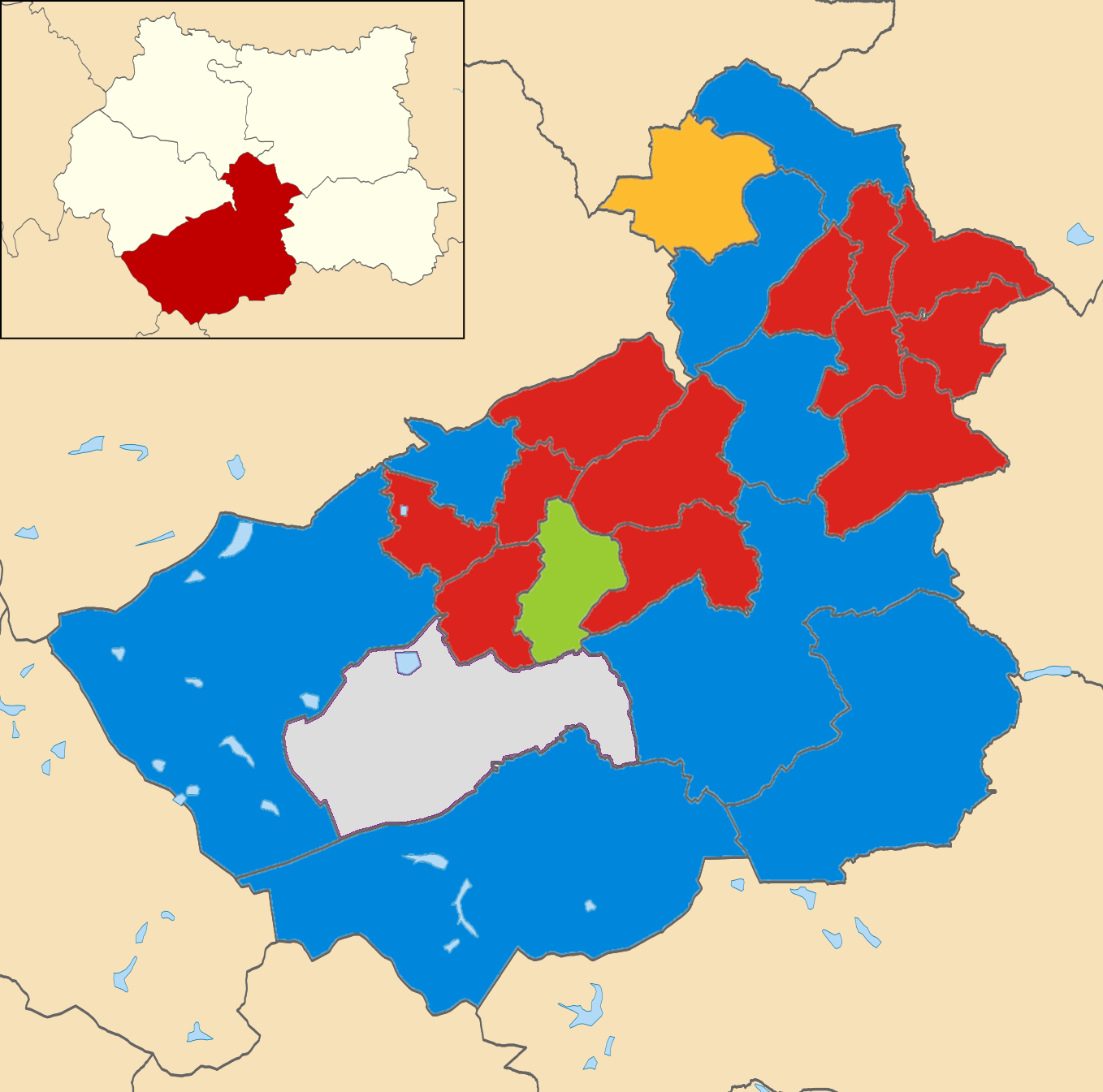
2015 results map

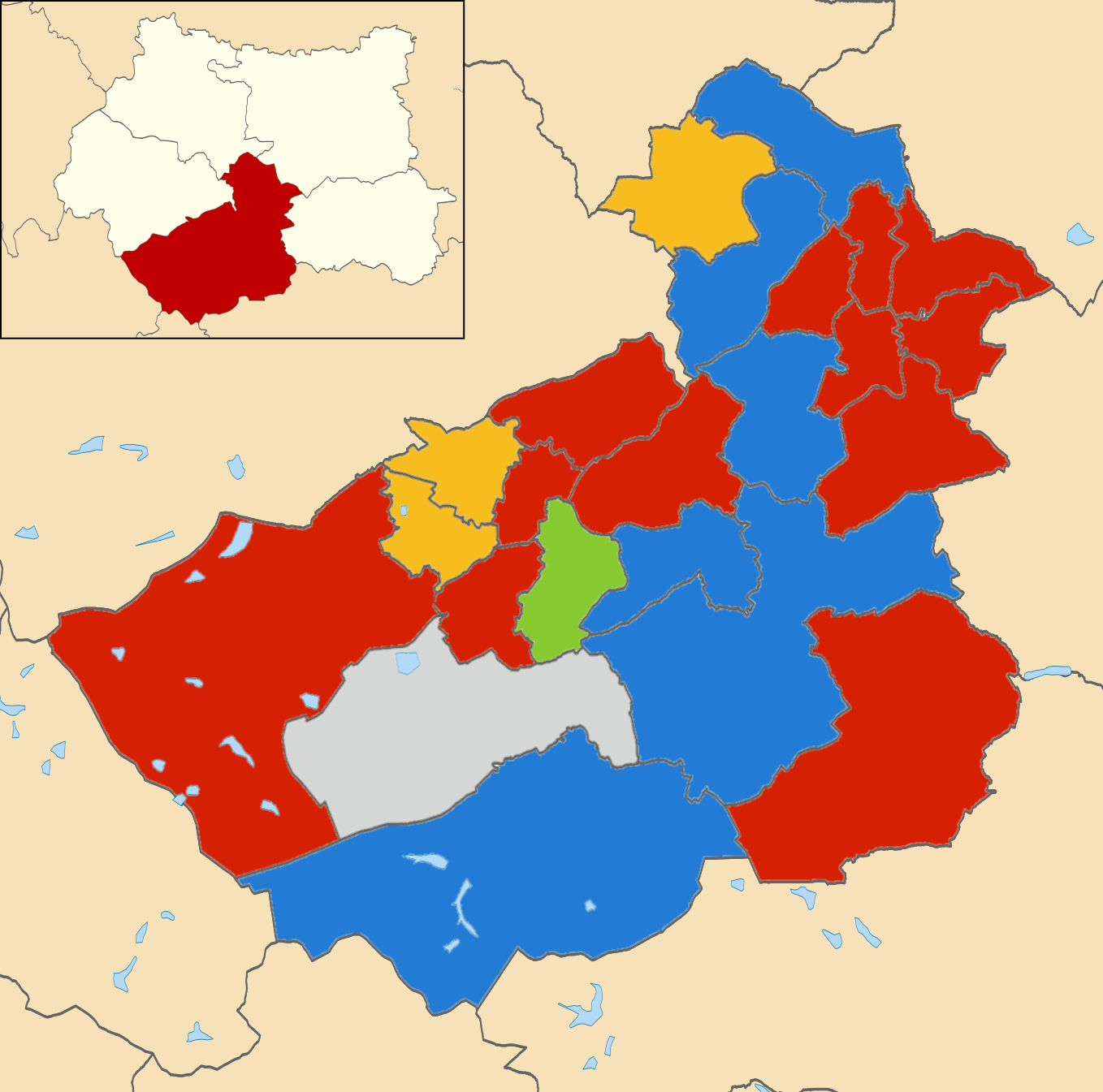
2016 results map

2018 results map

2019 results map

2021 results map

2022 results map

2023 results map

2024 results map

2026 results map

== By-election results ==
=== 1994-1998 ===
Batley West By-Election 26 September 1996
Party	Candidate	Votes	%	±%
Labour		1,558	48.9	
Liberal Democrats		1,179	37.0	
Conservative		375	11.7	
Green		73	2.3	
Majority		377	11.9	
Turnout		3,185		
Labour hold		Swing		

Colne Valley West By-Election 23 January 1997
Party	Candidate	Votes	%	±%
Liberal Democrats		2,077	50.6	
Labour		1,418	34.5	
Conservative		486	11.8	
Green		124	3.0	
Majority		659	16.1	
Turnout		4,105	38.2	
Liberal Democrats hold		Swing		

Heckmondwike By-Election 27 November 1997
Party	Candidate	Votes	%	±%
Labour		1,219	55.5	+1.7
Conservative		710	32.3	−3.5
Liberal Democrats		268	12.2	+6.2
Majority		509	23.2	
Turnout		2,197	16.0	
Labour gain from Conservative		Swing		

=== 1998-2002 ===
Paddock By-Election 24 February 2000
Party	Candidate	Votes	%	±%
Liberal Democrats		1,236	43.8	+31.3
Labour		1,039	36.8	−16.6
Conservative		456	16.2	−9.2
Socialist Labour		90	3.2	+0.3
Majority		197	7.0	
Turnout		2,821	25.1	
Liberal Democrats gain from Labour		Swing		

Golcar By-Election 9 November 2000
Party	Candidate	Votes	%	±%
Liberal Democrats		1,174	43.4	−13.1
Labour		976	36.0	+13.3
Conservative		518	19.1	+3.4
Socialist		40	1.5	+1.5
Majority		198	7.4	
Turnout		2,708	21.4	
Liberal Democrats hold		Swing		

Mirfield By-Election 7 June 2001
Party	Candidate	Votes	%	±%
Conservative		3,176	41.2	−14.6
Labour		2,892	37.5	+3.8
Liberal Democrats		1,651	21.4	+13.6
Majority		284	3.7	
Turnout		7,719		
Liberal Democrats hold		Swing		

=== 2002-2006 ===
Heckmondwike By-Election 14 August 2003
Party	Candidate	Votes	%	±%
BNP	David Exley	1,607	27.7	+27.7
Liberal Democrats	Tabasum Aslam	1,493	25.8	+3.9
Independent	Tim Crowther	1,147	19.8	+19.8
Labour	Florence Smith	982	16.9	−22.9
Conservative	Roger Roberts	490	8.5	−22.9
Green	Heidi Smithson	76	1.3	−5.6
Majority		114	1.9	
Turnout		5,795	43.8	
BNP gain from Labour		Swing		

=== 2006-2010 ===
Greenhead By-Election 27 July 2006
Party	Candidate	Votes	%	±%
Labour	Barbara Jones	2,904	63.5	+6.5
Liberal Democrats	John O'Reilly	814	17.8	−0.7
Conservative	Paul Murphy	287	6.3	−4.1
Green	Paul Cooney	240	5.3	−2.1
Respect	David Ellis	178	3.9	+3.9
BNP	Barry Fowler	148	3.2	−3.5
Majority		2,090	45.7	
Turnout		4,571	35.1	
Labour hold		Swing		

Dalton By-Election 10 July 2008
Party	Candidate	Votes	%	±%
Labour	Peter Daniel McBride	1,397	40.5	+10.0
Liberal Democrats	Alison Louise Munro	1,155	33.5	−0.8
Conservative	Martin James Leonard	605	17.5	−1.9
BNP	Jonathan David Baxter Wright	157	4.5	−6.3
Green	David William Hargreaves	103	3.0	−2.0
Independent	Colin Anthony Walder	34	1.0	+1.0
Majority		242	7.0	
Turnout		3,451	27.5	
Labour hold		Swing		

Dewsbury East By-Election 16 October 2008
Party	Candidate	Votes	%	±%
Labour	Cathy Scott	1,513	37.4	−2.0
Liberal Democrats	Dennis Hullock	1,405	34.8	+14.3
BNP	Joe Barber	690	17.1	−10.6
Conservative	Amelia Lynne Bolton	345	8.5	−3.9
Green	Adrian Hugh Cruden	58	1.4	N/A
Independent	Safiq Ali Patel	17	0.4	N/A
Independent	Alan Girvan	15	0.4	N/A
Majority		108	2.7	
Turnout		4,043	31.0	
Labour gain from BNP		Swing		

=== 2010-2014 ===
Liversedge and Gomersal By-Election 13 June 2013
Party	Candidate	Votes	%	±%
Labour	Simon Alvy	1,517	43.4	
Conservative	Sharon Light	1.378	39.4	
Liberal Democrats	Richard Farnhill	599	17.1	
Majority		139	4.0	
Turnout		3,494	25.3	
Labour gain from Conservative		Swing		

Golcar By-Election 21 November 2013
Party	Candidate	Votes	%	±%
Liberal Democrats	Christine Mary Iredale	1,591	47.6	
Labour	Stephan Georg Jungnitz	901	27.0	
UKIP	Gregory Lloyd Broome	450	13.5	
Green	Daniel Edward Greenwood	210	6.3	
Conservative	Clinton Noel Simpson	189	5.7	
Majority		690	20.7	
Turnout		3,341	23.0	
Liberal Democrats gain from Labour		Swing		

=== 2014-2018 ===
Batley East By-Election 26 October 2017
Party	Candidate	Votes	%	±%
Labour	Habiban Nisa Zaman	2,640	76.8	
Conservative	Paul Young	443	12.9	
Independent	Aleks Lukic	140	4.1	
Liberal Democrats	Jon Robert Bloom	136	4.0	
Green	David Michael Smith	70	2.0	
Majority		2,197	63.9	
Turnout		3,437	25.9	
Labour hold		Swing		

=== 2018-2022 ===
Denby Dale By-Election 1 November 2018
Party	Candidate	Votes	%	±%
Labour	Will Simpson	1,834	46.7	
Conservative	Paula Kemp	1,689	43.0	
Liberal Democrats	Alison Baskeyfield	289	7.4	
Green	Isabel Walters	116	3.0	
Majority		145	3.7	
Turnout		3,928		
Labour gain from Conservative		Swing		

Colne Valley By-Election 12 December 2019
Party	Candidate	Votes	%	±%
Conservative	Donna Bellamy	4,504	45.8	
Labour	Duggs Carre	3,308	46.7	
Liberal Democrats	Robert Iredale	1,386	14.1	
Green	Ian Vincent	646	6.6	
Majority		1,196	12.1	
Turnout		9,844		
Conservative gain from Labour		Swing		

Dewsbury West By-Election 12 December 2019
Party	Candidate	Votes	%	±%
Labour	Eric Firth	3,299	42.0	
Conservative	Keith Mallinson	2,669	33.9	
Heavy Woollen Independents	Ian Vincent	1,515	19.3	
Liberal Democrats	Dennis Hullock	380	4.8	
Majority		630	8.0	
Turnout		7,863		
Labour hold		Swing		

=== 2022-2026 ===
Batley East By-Election 31 August 2023
Party	Candidate	Votes	%	±%
Labour	Ebrahim Dockrat	2,248	73.7	+29.4
Conservative	Beverley Smith	413	13.5	−30.5
Liberal Democrats	Stephen Long	178	5.8	−0.1
Green	Simon Duffy	145	4.8	−3.9
Yorkshire	Bikatshi Katenga	42	1.4	+1.4
SDP	Mark Steele	24	0.8	+0.8
Majority		1,835	60.2	
Turnout		3,050		
Labour hold		Swing		

Holme Valley South By-Election 17 October 2024
Party	Candidate	Votes	%	±%
Conservative	Damian Brook	1,639	39.1	−2.2
Labour	Phillip Lucitt	1134	27.0	−18.3
Green	Toby Cooper	734	17.5	+8.0
Reform	Susan Laird	511	12.2	+12.2
Liberal Democrats	Howard Cohen	158	3.8	−0.1
Independent	Miri Finch	17	0.4	+0.4
Majority		1,835	60.2	
Turnout		3,050	27.2	
Conservative gain from Labour		Swing		

=== 2026-2030 ===
Almondbury By-Election 13 August 2026
Party	Candidate	Votes	%	±%
Liberal Democrats	Paola Davies	1,749	43.9	
Reform	Graham Haigh	1,078	27.0	
Conservative	Robert McGuin	528	13.2	
Green	Sa'Dia Mosaddeq	347	8.7	
Labour	Navraj Singh Hare	181	4.5	
Independent	Marquis Craven	103	2.6	
Majority		671	16.8	
Turnout		3,986		
Liberal Democrats gain from Reform		Swing		
