= Queensbury =

Queensbury may refer to:

== Places ==
=== Canada ===
- Queensbury Parish, New Brunswick

=== United Kingdom ===
==== England ====
- Queensbury, London
  - Queensbury (Brent ward)
- Queensbury, West Yorkshire
  - Queensbury Ward; see List of electoral wards in West Yorkshire

=== United States ===
- Queensbury, New York; in Warren County
  - Queensbury Union Free School District

== Facilities and structures ==
- Queensbury Mill, Somersworth, New Hampshire, USA; an NRHP-listed building
- Queensbury Hotel, Glen Falls, New York, USA

=== Transportation ===
- Queensbury Tunnel, West Yorkshire, England; a train tunnel
- Queensbury tube station, London, England; a London Underground station
- Queensbury railway station, West Yorkshire, England
- Queensbury Lines, West Yorkshire, England; several rail lines

== Other uses ==
- Queensbury Athletic Club, Toronto, Ontario, Canada; a pro-wrestling promotion

== See also ==
- Upper Queensbury, New Brunswick, Canada
- Queensbury and Shelf Urban District, West Riding of Yorkshire, County of York, England, UK
- Queensbury Rules in boxing
- Queensbury Academy (disambiguation)
- Queensbury School (disambiguation)
- Queensbury station (disambiguation)
- Queensberry (disambiguation)
