= Queensberry =

Queensberry may refer to:

== People, characters, and titles ==
- Duke of Queensberry, a hereditary title in Scotland
  - Duchess of Queensbury
- Marquess of Queensberry, a hereditary title in Scotland
  - Marchioness of Queensbury, consort to the Marquess of Queensberry
- Earl of Queensberry, a hereditary title in Scotland
  - Countess of Queensberry, consort to the Earl of Queensberry

== Places ==
- Queensberry (hill), Lowther Hills, Southern Uplands, Scotland, UK; a 697 m hill
- Queensberry, New Zealand, a locality in Otago region
- Queensberry Bay (bay), Eastern Cape, South Africa; see List of bays of South Africa

=== Facilities and structures ===
- Queensberry Hotel, Dumfries, Scotland, UK; a listed building
- Queensberry House, Canongate, Edinburgh, Scotland, UK; a listed building and part of the Scottish Parliament complex

== Other uses ==
- Queensberry (band), an all-female German pop group
- Marquess of Queensberry rules in boxing

== See also ==
- Volume I (Queensberry album), aka Queensberry Volume I
- "The Song" (Queensberry song), aka The Queensberry Song
- Queensberry Bay (town), Eastern Cape, South Africa
- Queensbury (disambiguation)
