= Queensbury Academy =

Queensbury Academy may refer to:

- Queensbury Academy, Dunstable, England
- Trinity Academy Bradford, England, formerly known as Queensbury Academy

== See also ==
- Queensbury School (disambiguation)
- Queensbury (disambiguation)
