= Queensbury School =

Queensbury School may refer to:

- Queensbury High School, New York City, New York, US
- Queensbury Elementary School, in School District 44 North Vancouver, British Columbia, Canada
- Queensbury School (West Yorkshire), England, UK; a secondary school in Queensbury
- Queensbury Academy, Dunstable, Bedfordshire, England, UK; formerly Queensbury Upper School
- Queensbury School, Erdington, a school in Birmingham, West Midlands, England, UK

== See also ==
- Queensbury Academy (disambiguation)
- Queensbury (disambiguation)
