= Woodbury Mill =

- U.S. National Register of Historic Places
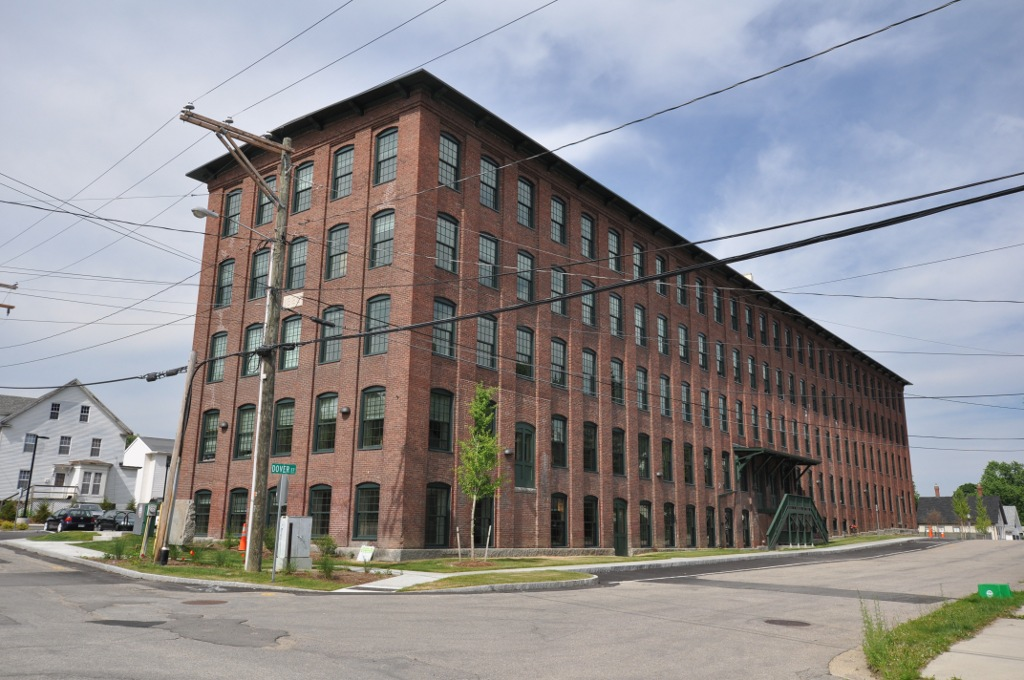

- Location within New Hampshire Location within the United States
- Location: 1 Dover St., Dover, New Hampshire
- Coordinates: 43°12′7″N 70°52′29″W
- Area: less than one acre
- NRHP reference No.: 13000156
- Added to NRHP: March 25, 2013

The Woodbury Mill is a historic mill building at 1 Dover Street in Dover, New Hampshire. This five-story utilitarian brick mill building was built in 1885 by the Dover Improvement Association as a factory space for small footwear manufacturers to operate in, representing an organized effort by city businessmen to attract this type of business. It was used for shoe manufacturing until 1979, and was listed on the National Register of Historic Places in 2013.

== Description and history ==
The Woodbury Mill building is located just north of downtown Dover, on the south side of Dover Street in what is essentially a residential area. It is five stories in height, 29 bays long and five wide, with a central brick firewall dividing the building into two roughly equal-size parts. Each part had an entrance near the center, one of which has since been filled in. Windows are set in segmented-arch openings and have wooden sills. The interior as originally built features exposed brick walls, wooden floors, and heavy post-and-beam construction.

Dover's 19th-century economic success was primarily due to the development of textile mills along the Cocheco River, with shoemaking little more than a cottage industry. The Dover Improvement Association was formed in 1885 by local businessmen to capitalize on improvements in shoemaking technology and bring a more organized approach to that industry into the city. This mill was built in the same year, on six house lots previously subdivided by John Ham, and was one of two mills the association would build. The Woodbury Brothers were one of its first tenants, occupying about half the space in the building. They would operate on the premises, employing as many as 250 workers, until 1894. The building continued to be used for shoe-related manufacturing, under a variety of owners and occupants, until 1979.

== See also ==
- Queensbury Mill: another historic shoe factory in New Hampshire.
- National Register of Historic Places listings in Strafford County, New Hampshire
