= 2010 Kirklees Metropolitan Borough Council election =

2010 English local government election

Map of the 2010 Kirklees Metropolitan Borough Council election

The 2010 Kirklees Metropolitan Borough Council election took place on 1 May 2008 to elect a third of the members of Kirklees Metropolitan Borough Council, the council of Kirklees in England. This was on the same day as the other local elections as well as the 2010 United Kingdom general election. The previous council election took place in 2008 and the following election was held in 2011. In the election, the council stayed under no overall control. Terry Lyons made Kirklees history as the first independent candidate to win back his council seat. The British National Party lost their only seat making it the first time since 2003 that they had no members on the council.

== Results ==
Party	Previous	Seats +/-	2010
Labour	22	▲2	24
Liberal Democrat	19	▲1	20
Conservative	21	▼2	19
Green	4	Steady	4
British National Party	1	▼1	0
Others	2	Steady	2

== See also ==
- Kirklees Metropolitan Borough Council elections
