= 2014 Kirklees Metropolitan Borough Council election =

2014 UK local government election

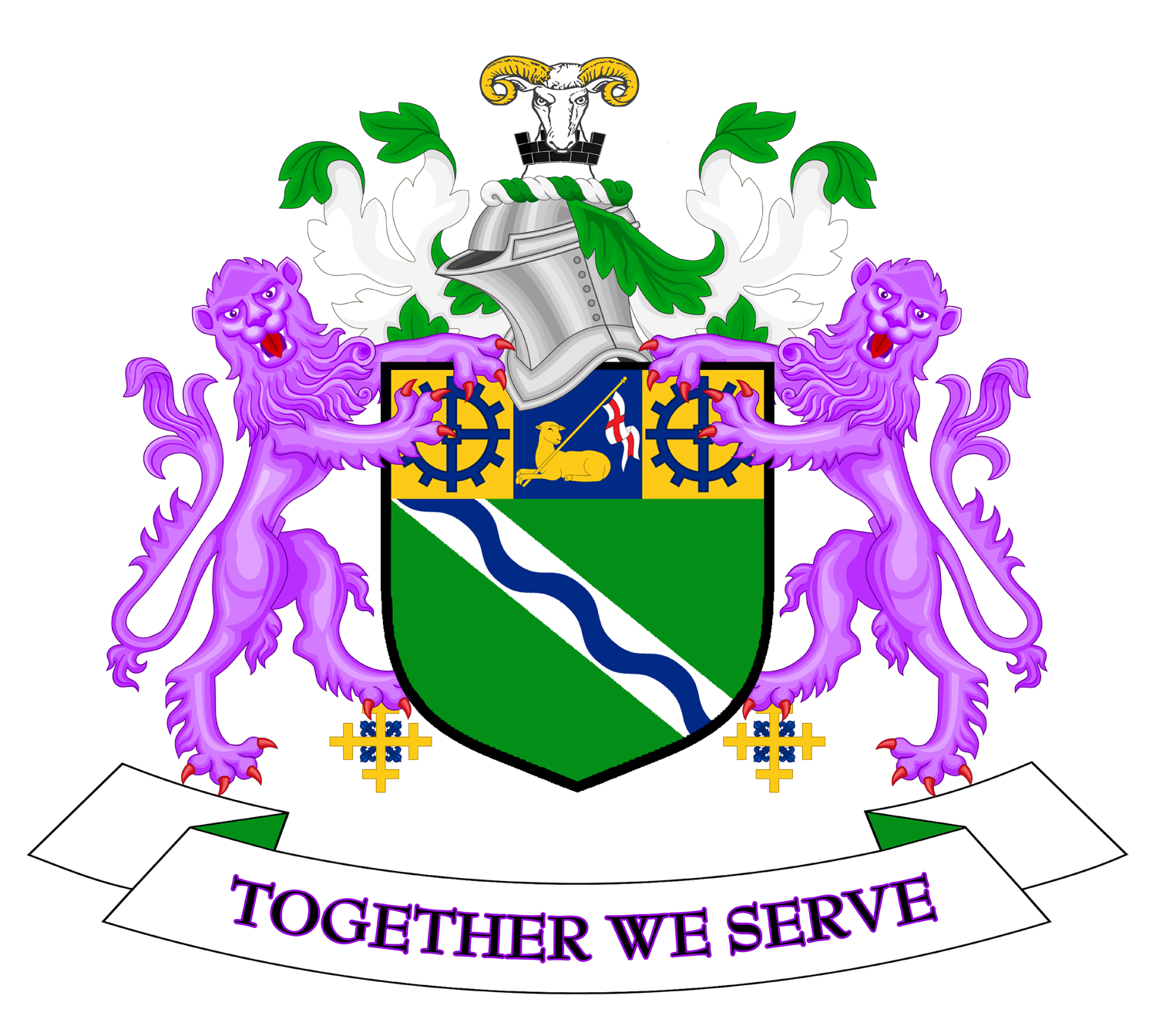
- May 22, 2014

24 of the 69 seats on Kirklees Metropolitan Borough Council 35 seats needed for a majority
	First party	Second party	Third party
Leader	David Sheard	David Hall	Kath Pinnock
Party	Labour	Conservative	Liberal Democrats
Leader's seat	Heckmondwike	Liversedge and Gomersal	Cleckheaton
Seats before	32	19	10
Seats won	10	6	5
Seats after	32	19	10
Seat change	Steady	Steady	Steady
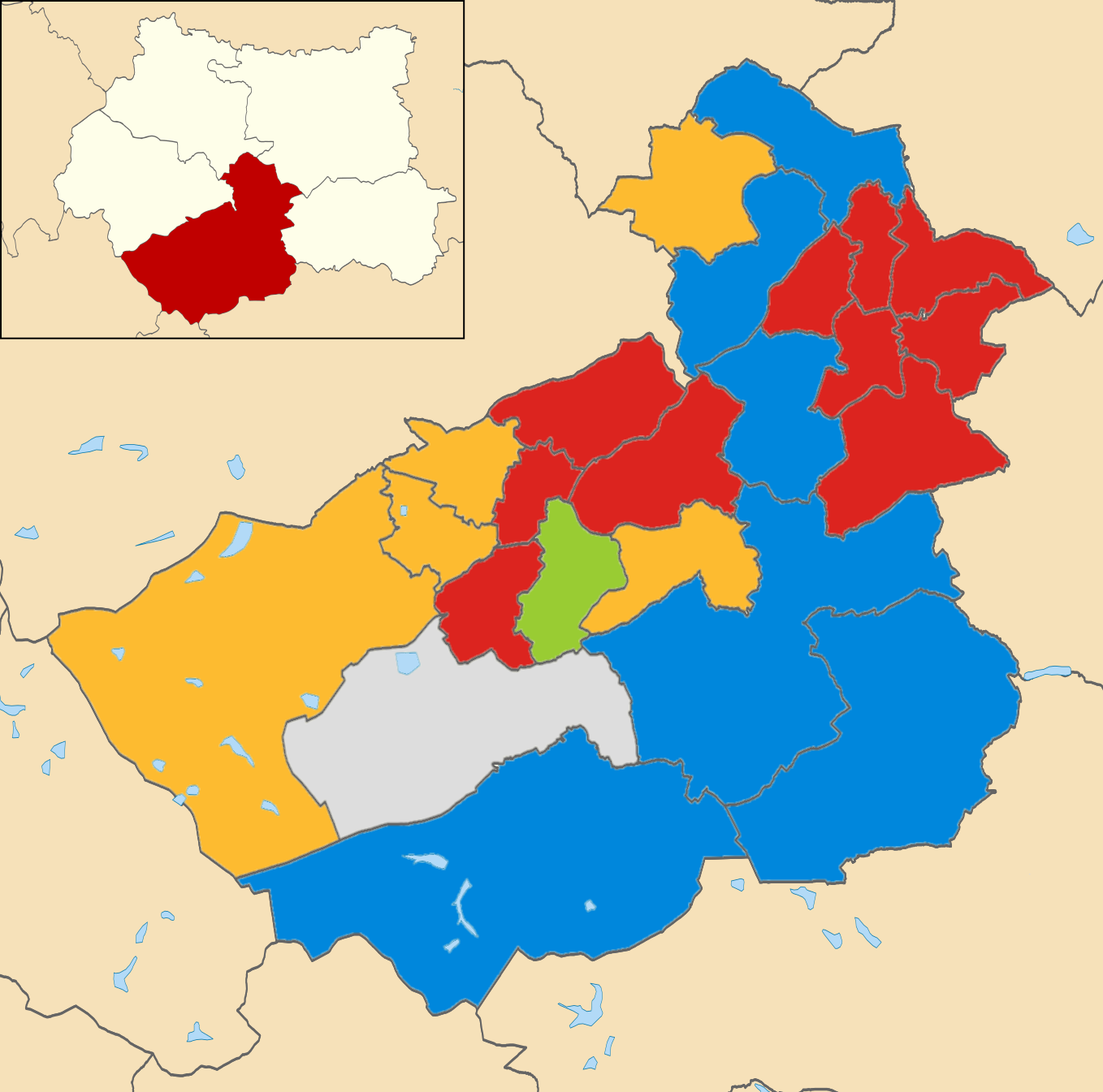
- 2014 local election results in Kirklees
Leader before election
David Sheard
Labour
No overall control (Note: Labour minority.)
Leader after election
David Sheard
Labour
No overall control

The 2023 Kirklees Metropolitan Borough Council elections were held on 22 May 2014 alongside other elections across the United Kingdom. 24 out of the 69 seats on Kirklees Metropolitan Borough Council were contested.

The council remained in no overall control with a Labour minority administration.

== Background ==
The Local Government Act 1972 created a two-tier system of metropolitan counties and districts covering Greater Manchester, Merseyside, South Yorkshire, Tyne and Wear, the West Midlands, and West Yorkshire starting in 1974. Kirklees was a district of the West Yorkshire metropolitan county. The Local Government Act 1985 abolished the metropolitan counties, with metropolitan districts taking on most of their powers as metropolitan boroughs.

Kirklees Council has generally been under no overall control or Labour control since its creation, with the Conservatives controlling the council between 1976 and 1979. It is considered one of the most marginal councils in West Yorkshire.

The seats that were up for election in 2014 were last contested in 2010

This was the first election contested by David Sheard as leader of the Kirklees Labour Party and as leader of the council after Mehmoob Khan stepped down earlier in the year.

This would be the last election Kath Pinnock would contest as the leader of the Kirklees Liberal Democrats. A role she had held since 1991, stepping down in August 2014.

== Electoral process ==
The council elects its councillors in thirds, with a third being up for election every year for three years, with no election in the fourth year. Councillors are elected via first-past-the-post voting, with each ward represented by three councillors, with one elected in each election year to serve a four-year term.

All registered electors (British, Irish, Commonwealth and European Union citizens) living in Kirklees aged 18 or over will be entitled to vote in the election. People who live at two addresses in different councils, such as university students with different term-time and holiday addresses, are entitled to be registered for and vote in elections in both local authorities. Voting in-person at polling stations will take place from 07:00 to 22:00 on election day, and voters will be able to apply for postal votes or proxy votes in advance of the election.

== Council composition ==
After 2012 election		Before 2014 election		After 2014 election	
Party	Seats	Party	Seats	Party	
Labour	32	Labour	32	Labour	32
Conservative	19	Conservative	19	Conservative	19
Liberal Democrats	10	Liberal Democrats	10	Liberal Democrats	10
Green	5	Green	5	Green	5
Independent	3	Independent	3	Independent	3
