= List of electoral wards in West Yorkshire =

This is a list of electoral divisions and wards in the ceremonial county of West Yorkshire in Yorkshire and the Humber. All changes since the re-organisation of local government following the passing of the Local Government Act 1972 are shown. The number of councillors elected for each electoral division or ward is shown in brackets.

== District councils ==
=== Bradford ===
Wards from 1 April 1974 (first election 10 May 1973) to 1 May 1980:

Wards from 1 May 1980 to 10 June 2004:

1. Baildon (3)
2. Bingley (3)
3. Bingley Rural (3)
4. Bolton (3)
5. Bowling (3)
6. Bradford Moor (3)
7. Clayton (3)
8. Craven (3)
9. Eccleshill (3)
10. Great Horton (3)
11. Heaton (3)
12. Idle (3)
13. Ilkley (3)
14. Keighley North (3)
15. Keighley South (3)
16. Keighley West (3)
17. Little Horton (3)
18. Odsal (3)
19. Queensbury (3)
20. Rombalds (3)
21. Shipley East (3)
22. Shipley West (3)
23. Thornton (3)
24. Toller (3)
25. Tong (3)
26. Undercliffe (3)
27. University (3)
28. Wibsey (3)
29. Worth Valley (3)
30. Wyke (3)

Wards from 10 June 2004 to 7 May 2026:

1. Baildon (3)
2. Bingley (3)
3. Bingley Rural (3) †
4. Bolton & Undercliffe (3)
5. Bowling & Barkerend (3)
6. Bradford Moor (3)
7. City (3)
8. Clayton & Fairweather Green (3)
9. Craven (3)
10. Eccleshill (3)
11. Great Horton (3)
12. Heaton (3)
13. Idle & Thackley (3)
14. Ilkley (3)
15. Keighley Central (3)
16. Keighley East (3)
17. Keighley West (3)
18. Little Horton (3)
19. Manningham (3)
20. Queensbury (3)
21. Royds (3)
22. Shipley (3)
23. Thornton & Allerton (3)
24. Toller (3)
25. Tong (3)
26. Wharfedale (3)
27. Wibsey (3)
28. Windhill & Wrose (3)
29. Worth Valley (3) †
30. Wyke (3)

† minor boundary changes in 2008Wards from 7 May 2026 to present:

1. Airedale (3)
2. Baildon (3)
3. Bingley East (3)
4. Bingley West (3)
5. Bolton & Undercliffe (3)
6. Bowling & Barkerend (3)
7. Bradford Moor (3)
8. City (3)
9. Clayton & Fairweather Green (3)
10. Eccleshill (3)
11. Great Horton (3)
12. Heaton & Frizinghall (3)
13. Holme Wood & Bierley (3)
14. Idle & Thackley (3)
15. Ilkley & Addingham (3)
16. Keighley Central (3)
17. Keighley East (3)
18. Keighley West (3)
19. Little Horton (3)
20. Manningham (3)
21. Queensbury (3)
22. Royds (3)
23. Shipley (3)
24. Thornton & Allerton (3)
25. Toller (3)
26. Wharfedale (3)
27. Wibsey & Odsal (3)
28. Windhill & Wrose (3)
29. Worth Valley (3)
30. Wyke (3)

=== Calderdale ===
Wards from 1 April 1974 (first election 10 May 1973) to 1 May 1980:

Wards from 1 May 1980 to 10 June 2004:

1. Brighouse (3)
2. Calder (3)
3. Elland (3)
4. Greetland and Stainland (3)
5. Hipperholme and Lightcliffe (3)
6. Illingworth (3)
7. Luddendenfoot (3)
8. Mixenden (3)
9. Northowram and Shelf (3)
10. Ovenden (3)
11. Rastrick (3)
12. Ryburn (3)
13. Skircoat (3)
14. Sowerby Bridge (3)
15. St. John’s (3)
16. Todmorden (3)
17. Town (3)
18. Valley (3)
19. Warley (3)

Wards from 10 June 2004 to 7 May 2026:

1. Brighouse (3)
2. Calder (3)
3. Elland (3)
4. Greetland & Stainland (3)
5. Hipperholme & Lightcliffe (3)
6. Illingworth & Mixenden (3)
7. Luddendenfoot (3)
8. Northowram & Shelf (3)
9. Ovenden (3)
10. Park (3)
11. Rastrick (3)
12. Ryburn (3)
13. Skircoat (3)
14. Sowerby Bridge (3)
15. Todmorden (3)
16. Town (3)
17. Warley (3)

Wards from 7 May 2026 to present:

1. Brighouse (3)
2. Elland (3)
3. Greetland (3)
4. Halifax Town (3)
5. Hebden Bridge & Todmorden East (3)
6. Hipperholme & Lightcliffe (3)
7. Illingworth & Mixenden (3)
8. Luddendenfoot (3)
9. Northowram & Shelf (3)
10. Ovenden (3)
11. Park (3)
12. Rastrick (3)
13. Ryburn (3)
14. Salterhebble, Southowram & Skircoat Green (3)
15. Sowerby Bridge (3)
16. Todmorden West (3)
17. Wainhouse (3)
18. Warley (3)

=== Kirklees ===
Wards from 1 April 1974 (first election 10 May 1973) to 6 May 1982:

1. Crosland Moor (3)
2. Dewsbury South (3)
3. No. 10 (Huddersfield: Longwood-Milnsbridge-Paddock) (3)
4. No. 12 (Batley: East & Soothill) (3)
5. No. 13 (Batley: West) (3)
6. No. 14 (Batley: Birstall & North) (3)
7. No. 15 (Spenborough: Hightown-Roberttown & Norrist) (3)
8. No. 16 (Spenborough: Cleckheaton-Oakenshaw-Scholes
9. No. 17 (Spenborough: Birkenshaw & Gomersal & Heckmondwike) (3)
10. No. 18 (Colne Valley: East) (3)
11. No. 19 (Colne Valley: Central-North-West) (3)
12. No. 2 (Dewsbury: All Saints-Earlsheaton-Shaw Cross) (3)
13. No. 20 (Denby Dale) (3)
14. No. 21 (Meltham & Honley) (3)
15. No. 22 (Holmfirth) (3)
16. No. 23 (Kirkburton) (3)
17. No. 24 (Mirfield) (3)
18. No. 3 (Dewsbury: Ravensthorpe-St. Johns-Trinity) (3)
19. No. 4 (Huddersfield: Dalton) (3)
20. No. 5 (Huddersfield: Almondbury) (3)
21. No. 6 (Huddersfield: Deighton) (3)
22. No. 7 (Huddersfield: Newsome & Central) (3)
23. No. 8 (Huddersfield: Birkby and Fartown) (3)
24. No. 9 (Huddersfield: Lindley & Marsh) (3)

Wards from 6 May 1982 to 10 June 2004:

1. Almondbury (3)
2. Batley East (3)
3. Batley West (3)
4. Birkby (3)
5. Birstall and Birkenshaw (3)
6. Cleckheaton (3)
7. Colne Valley West (3)
8. Crosland Moor (3)
9. Dalton (3)
10. Deighton (3)
11. Denby Dale (3)
12. Dewsbury East (3)
13. Dewsbury West (3)
14. Golcar (3)
15. Heckmondwike (3)
16. Holme Valley North (3)
17. Holme Valley South (3)
18. Kirkburton (3)
19. Lindley (3)
20. Mirfield (3)
21. Newsome (3)
22. Paddock (3)
23. Spen (3)
24. Thornhill (3)

Wards from 10 June 2004 to 7 May 2026:

1. Almondbury (3)
2. Ashbrow (3)
3. Batley East (3)
4. Batley West (3)
5. Birstall & Birkenshaw (3)
6. Cleckheaton (3)
7. Colne Valley (3)
8. Crosland Moor & Netherton (3)
9. Dalton (3)
10. Denby Dale (3)
11. Dewsbury East (3)
12. Dewsbury South (3)
13. Dewsbury West (3)
14. Golcar (3)
15. Greenhead (3)
16. Heckmondwike (3)
17. Holme Valley North (3)
18. Holme Valley South (3)
19. Kirkburton (3)
20. Lindley (3)
21. Liversedge & Gomersal (3)
22. Mirfield (3)
23. Newsome (3)

Wards from 7 May 2026 to present:

1. Almondbury (3)
2. Ashbrow (3)
3. Batley East (3)
4. Batley West (3)
5. Birstall & Birkenshaw (3)
6. Cleckheaton (3)
7. Colne Valley East (3)
8. Colne Valley West (3)
9. Crosland Moor (3)
10. Dalton (3)
11. Denby Dale (3)
12. Dewsbury East (3)
13. Dewsbury South (3)
14. Dewsbury West (3)
15. Greenhead (3)
16. Heckmondwike (3)
17. Holme Valley North (3)
18. Holme Valley South (3)
19. Kirkburton (3)
20. Lindley (3)
21. Liversedge & Gomersal (3)
22. Mirfield (3)
23. Netherton and Newsome (3)

=== Leeds ===
Wards from 1 April 1974 (first election 10 May 1973) to 1 May 1980:

Wards from 1 May 1980 to 10 June 2004:

1. Aireborough (3)
2. Armley (3)
3. Barwick and Kippax (3)
4. Beeston North (3)
5. Bramley (3)
6. Burmantofts (3)
7. Chapel Allerton (3)
8. City and Holbeck (3)
9. Cookridge (3)
10. Garforth and Swillington (3)
11. Halton (3)
12. Harehills (3)
13. Headingley (3)
14. Horsforth (3)
15. Hunslet (3)
16. Kirkstall (3)
17. Middleton (3)
18. Moortown (3)
19. Morley North (3)
20. Morley South (3)
21. North (3)
22. Otley and Wharfedale (3)
23. Pudsey North (3)
24. Pudsey South (3)
25. Richmond Hill (3)
26. Rothwell (3)
27. Roundhay (3)
28. Seacroft (3)
29. University (3)
30. Weetwood (3)
31. Wetherby (3)
32. Whinmoor (3)
33. Wortley (3)

Wards from 10 June 2004 to 3 May 2018:

1. Adel and Wharfedale (3)
2. Alwoodley (3)
3. Ardsley and Robin Hood (3)
4. Armley (3)
5. Beeston and Holbeck (3)
6. Bramley and Stanningley (3)
7. Burmantofts and Richmond Hill (3)
8. Calverley and Farsley (3)
9. Chapel Allerton (3)
10. City and Hunslet (3)
11. Cross Gates and Whinmoor (3)
12. Farnley and Wortley (3)
13. Garforth and Swillington (3)
14. Gipton and Harehills (3)
15. Guiseley and Rawdon (3)
16. Harewood (3)
17. Headingley (3)
18. Horsforth (3)
19. Hyde Park and Woodhouse (3)
20. Killingbeck and Seacroft (3)
21. Kippax and Methley (3)
22. Kirkstall (3)
23. Middleton Park (3)
24. Moortown (3)
25. Morley North (3)
26. Morley South (3)
27. Otley and Yeadon (3)
28. Pudsey (3)
29. Rothwell (3)
30. Roundhay (3)
31. Temple Newsam (3)
32. Weetwood (3)
33. Wetherby (3)

Wards from 3 May 2018 to present:

1. Adel & Wharfedale (3)
2. Alwoodley (3)
3. Ardsley & Robin Hood (3)
4. Armley (3)
5. Beeston & Holbeck (3)
6. Bramley & Stanningley (3)
7. Burmantofts & Richmond Hill (3)
8. Calverley & Farsley (3)
9. Chapel Allerton (3)
10. Cross Gates & Whinmoor (3)
11. Farnley & Wortley (3)
12. Garforth & Swillington (3)
13. Gipton & Harehills (3)
14. Guiseley & Rawdon (3)
15. Harewood (3)
16. Headingley and Hyde Park (3)
17. Horsforth (3)
18. Hunslet and Riverside (3)
19. Killingbeck & Seacroft (3)
20. Kippax & Methley (3)
21. Kirkstall (3)
22. Little London and Woodhouse (3)
23. Middleton Park (3)
24. Moortown (3)
25. Morley North (3)
26. Morley South (3)
27. Otley & Yeadon (3)
28. Pudsey (3)
29. Rothwell (3)
30. Roundhay (3)
31. Temple Newsam (3)
32. Weetwood (3)
33. Wetherby (3)

=== Wakefield ===
Wards from 1 April 1974 (first election 10 May 1973) to 6 May 1982:

Wards from 6 May 1982 to 10 June 2004:

1. Castleford Ferry Fryston (3)
2. Castleford Glasshoughton (3)
3. Castleford Whitwood (3)
4. Crofton and Ackworth (3)
5. Featherstone (3)
6. Hemsworth (3)
7. Horbury (3)
8. Knottingley (3)
9. Normanton and Sharlston (3)
10. Ossett (3)
11. Pontefract North (3)
12. Pontefract South (3)
13. South Elmsall (3)
14. South Kirkby (3)
15. Stanley and Altofts (3)
16. Stanley and Wrenthorpe (3)
17. Wakefield Central (3)
18. Wakefield East (3)
19. Wakefield North (3)
20. Wakefield Rural (3)
21. Wakefield South (3)

Wards from 10 June 2004 to 7 May 2026:

1. Ackworth, North Elmsall & Upton (3)
2. Airedale & Ferry Fryston (3)
3. Altofts and Whitwood (3)
4. Castleford Central & Glasshoughton (3)
5. Crofton, Ryhill & Walton (3)
6. Featherstone (3)
7. Hemsworth (3)
8. Horbury & South Ossett (3)
9. Knottingley (electoral ward) (3)
10. Normanton (electoral ward) (3)
11. Ossett (3)
12. Pontefract North (3)
13. Pontefract South (3)
14. South Elmsall & South Kirkby (3)
15. Stanley & Outwood East (3)
16. Wakefield East (3)
17. Wakefield North (3)
18. Wakefield Rural (3)
19. Wakefield South (3)
20. Wakefield West (3)
21. Wrenthorpe & Outwood West (3)

Wards from 7 May 2026 to present:

1. Ackworth, North Elmsall & Upton (3)
2. Airedale & Ferry Fryston (3)
3. Altofts and Whitwood (3)
4. Castleford Central & Glasshoughton (3)
5. Crofton, Ryhill & Walton (3)
6. Featherstone (3)
7. Hemsworth (3)
8. Horbury & South Ossett (3)
9. Knottingley and Ferrybridge (3)
10. Normanton (electoral ward) (3)
11. Ossett (3)
12. Pontefract North (3)
13. Pontefract South (3)
14. South Elmsall & South Kirkby (3)
15. Stanley & Outwood East (3)
16. Wakefield East (3)
17. Wakefield North (3)
18. Wakefield Rural (3)
19. Wakefield South (3)
20. Wakefield West (3)
21. Wrenthorpe & Outwood West (3)

== Former county council ==
=== West Yorkshire ===
Electoral Divisions from 1 April 1974 (first election 12 April 1973) to 1 April 1986 (county abolished):

1. Aireborough (1)
2. Baildon (1)
3. Batley No. 1 (1)
4. Batley No. 2 (1)
5. Bingley (1)
6. Bradford No. 1 (2)
7. Bradford No. 2 (2)
8. Bradford No. 3 (2)
9. Bradford No. 4 (1)
10. Bradford No. 5 (1)
11. Bradford No. 6 (2)
12. Bradford No. 7 (2)
13. Brighouse No. 1 (1)
14. Brighouse No. 2 (1)
15. Castleford No. 1 (1)
16. Castleford No. 2 (1)
17. Colne Valley (1)
18. Dewsbury No. 1 (1)
19. Dewsbury No. 2 (1)
20. Elland (1)
21. Featherstone (1)
22. Garforth No. 1 (1)
23. Garforth No. 2 (1)
24. Halifax No. 1 (1)
25. Halifax No. 2 (1)
26. Halifax No. 3 (1)
27. Halifax No. 4 (1)
28. Hemsworth (1)
29. Hemsworth Rural (1)
30. Holmfirth (1)
31. Horsforth (1)
32. Huddersfield No. 1 (1)
33. Huddersfield No. 2 (1)
34. Huddersfield No. 3 (1)
35. Huddersfield No. 4 (1)
36. Huddersfield No. 5 (1)
37. Ilkley (1)
38. Keighley No. 1 (1)
39. Keighley No. 2 (1)
40. Keighley No. 3 (1)
41. Kirkburton & Denby Dale (1)
42. Knottingley (1)
43. Leeds No. 1 (1)
44. Leeds No. 2 (1)
45. Leeds No. 3 (1)
46. Leeds No. 4 (1)
47. Leeds No. 5 (1)
48. Leeds No. 6 (1)
49. Leeds No. 7 (1)
50. Leeds No. 8 (1)
51. Leeds No. 9 (1)
52. Leeds No. 10 (Bramley) (1)
53. Leeds No. 11 (Halton) (1)
54. Leeds No. 12 (Headingley) (1)
55. Leeds No. 13 (Kirkstall) (1)
56. Leeds No. 14 (Burley) (1)
57. Leeds No. 15 (Middleton) (1)
58. Leeds No. 16 (Moortown) (1)
59. Leeds No. 17 (Osmondthorpe) (1)
60. Leeds No. 18 (Seacroft) (1)
61. Leeds No. 19 (Stanningley) (1)
62. Leeds No. 20 (Talbot) (1)
63. Leeds No. 21 (Wortley) (1)
64. Mirfield (1)
65. Morley No. 1 (1)
66. Morley No. 2 (1)
67. Normanton (1)
68. Ossett (1)
69. Otley (1)
70. Pontefract (1)
71. Pudsey No. 1 (1)
72. Pudsey No. 2 (1)
73. Rothwell (1)
74. Shipley (1)
75. Sowerby Bridge (1)
76. Spenborough No. 1 (1)
77. Spenborough No. 2 (1)
78. Stanley (1)
79. Todmorden (1)
80. Wakefield No. 1 (1)
81. Wakefield No. 2 (1)
82. Wakefield Rural (1)
83. Wetherby (1)

Electoral Divisions due from 2 May 1985 (order revoked by the Local Government Act 1985):

1. Aireborough (1)
2. Armley (1)
3. Baildon (1)
4. Barwick & Kippax (1)
5. Batley (1)
6. Beeston (1)
7. Bingley (1)
8. Bingley Rural (1)
9. Birstall & Birkenshaw (1)
10. Bolton (1)
11. Bowling (1)
12. Bramley (1)
13. Brighouse (1)
14. Burmantofts (1)
15. Calder Valley East (1)
16. Calder Valley West (1)
17. Castleford Ferry Fryston (1)
18. Castleford Whitwood (1)
19. Central Halifax (1)
20. Chapel Allerton (1)
21. City & Holbeck (1)
22. Clayton (1)
23. Cleckheaton (1)
24. Coley (1)
25. Colne Valley (1)
26. Cookridge (1)
27. Craven (1)
28. Crosland (1)
29. Dalton (1)
30. Deighton (1)
31. Denby Dale (1)
32. Dewsbury (1)
33. Elland (1)
34. Featherstone (1)
35. Garforth & Swillington (1)
36. Great Horton (1)
37. Halton (1)
38. Harehills (1)
39. Headingley (1)
40. Heaton (1)
41. Heckmondwike (1)
42. Hemsworth (1)
43. Holme Valley (1)
44. Horsforth (1)
45. Hunslet (1)
46. Idle (1)
47. Ilkley (1)
48. Keighley South (1)
49. Keighley West (1)
50. Kirkstall (1)
51. Knottingley (1)
52. Leeds North (1)
53. Lindley (1)
54. Little Horton (1)
55. Middleton (1)
56. Mirfield & Ravensthorpe (1)
57. Moortown (1)
58. Morley North (1)
59. Morley South (1)
60. New Queensbury (1)
61. Newsome & Almondbury (1)
62. Normanton & Sharlston (1)
63. North Halifax (1)
64. Ossett (1)
65. Otley & Wharfedale (1)
66. Paddock (1)
67. Pontefract (1)
68. Pudsey North (1)
69. Pudsey South (1)
70. Richmond Hill (1)
71. Rothwell (1)
72. Roundhay (1)
73. Seacroft (1)
74. Shipley (1)
75. South Elmsall (1)
76. South West Halifax (1)
77. Sowerby Bridge (1)
78. Stanley & Wrenthorpe (1)
79. Thornhill (1)
80. Toller (1)
81. Tong (1)
82. Undercliffe (1)
83. University (1)
84. Wakefield Central (1)
85. Wakefield East (1)
86. Wakefield Rural (1)
87. Wakefield South (1)
88. Weetwood (1)
89. Wetherby (1)
90. Whinmoor (1)
91. Wortley (1)
92. Wyke (1)

== Electoral wards by constituency ==
Wards as they existed on 1 December 2020.

=== Bradford East ===
Bradford: Bolton & Undercliffe; Bowling & Barkerend (polling districts 5A, 5B, 5C, 5D, 5E, 5G & 5H); Bradford Moor; Eccleshill; Idle & Thackley; Little Horton.

=== Bradford South ===
Bradford: Bowling & Barkerend (polling district 5F); Great Horton; Queensbury; Royds; Tong; Wibsey; Wyke.

=== Bradford West ===
Bradford: City; Clayton & Fairweather Green; Heaton; Manningham Thornton & Allerton; Toller.

=== Calder Valley ===
Calderdale: Brighouse; Calder; Elland; Greetland & Stainland; Hipperholme & Lightcliffe; Luddendenfoot; Rastrick; Ryburn (polling districts MA, ME, MF, MG, MH, MJ & MK); Todmorden.

=== Colne Valley ===
Kirklees: Colne Valley; Golcar; Holme Valley North; Holme Valley South; Lindley.

=== Dewsbury and Batley ===
Kirklees: Batley East; Batley West; Dewsbury East; Dewsbury South; Dewsbury West; Kirkburton (polling districts KB04, KB07A, KB07B & KB10).

=== Halifax ===
Calderdale: Illingworth & Mixenden; Northowram & Shelf; Ovenden; Park; Ryburn (polling districts MB, MC & MD); Skircoat; Sowerby Bridge; Town; Warley.

=== Huddersfield ===
Kirklees: Almondbury; Ashbrow; Crosland Moor & Netherton; Dalton (polling districts DA01, DA02, DA03, DA04, DA05, DA07 & DA08); Greenhead; Newsome.

=== Keighley and Ilkley ===
Bradford: Craven; Ilkley; Keighley Central; Keighley East; Keighley West; Worth Valley.

=== Leeds Central and Headingley ===
Leeds: Headingley & Hyde Park; Kirkstall; Little London & Woodhouse; Weetwood.

=== Leeds East ===
Leeds: Cross Gates & Whinmoor; Garforth & Swillington; Gipton & Harehills; Killingbeck & Seacroft; Temple Newsam (polling districts TNB, TNC-X, TNC-Y, TNF & TNG).

=== Leeds North East ===
Leeds: Alwoodley; Chapel Allerton; Moortown; Roundhay.

=== Leeds North West ===
Leeds: Adel & Wharfedale; Guiseley & Rawdon; Horsforth; Otley & Yeadon.

=== Leeds South ===
Leeds: Beeston & Holbeck; Burmantofts & Richmond Hill; Hunslet & Riverside; Middleton Park; Temple Newsam (polling districts TNA, TND, TNE, TNH, TNI, TNJ, TNK & TNL).

=== Leeds South West and Morley ===
Leeds: Ardsley & Robin Hood; Farnley & Wortley; Morley North; Morley South.

=== Leeds West and Pudsey ===
Leeds: Armley; Bramley & Stanningley; Calverley & Farsley; Pudsey.

=== Normanton and Hemsworth ===
Wakefield: Ackworth, North Elmsall & Upton; Crofton, Ryhill & Walton; Featherstone; Hemsworth; Normanton; South Elmsall & South Kirkby.

=== Ossett and Denby Dale ===
Kirklees: Denby Dale; Kirkburton (polling districts KB01, KB02, KB03A, KB03B, KB05, KB06, KB08 & KB09).

Wakefield: Horbury & South Ossett; Ossett; Wakefield Rural; Wakefield South.

=== Pontefract, Castleford and Knottingley ===
Wakefield: Airedale & Ferry Fryston; Altofts & Whitwood; Castleford Central & Glasshoughton; Knottingley; Pontefract North; Pontefract South.

=== Selby (part) ===
Leeds: Kippax & Methley.

=== Shipley ===
Bradford: Baildon; Bingley; Bingley Rural; Shipley; Wharfedale; Windhill & Wrose.

=== Spen Valley ===
Kirklees: Birstall & Birkenshaw; Cleckheaton; Dalton (polling district DA06); Heckmondwike; Liversedge & Gomersal; Mirfield.

=== Wakefield and Rothwell ===
Leeds: Rothwell.

Wakefield: Stanley & Outwood East; Wakefield East; Wakefield North; Wakefield West; Wrenthorpe & Outwood West.

=== Wetherby and Easingwold (part) ===
Leeds: Harewood; Wetherby.

== See also ==
- List of parliamentary constituencies in West Yorkshire
