= Queensbury station =

Queensbury station or variant, may refer to:

- Queensbury tube station, London, England, UK; a London Underground subway station
- Queensbury railway station, Queensbury, West Yorkshire, England, UK; a village train station
- "Queensbury Station" (song), a 1988 song by 'The Magoo Brothers' on their album Beyond Believable; see Metro-land

== See also ==
- Queensbury (disambiguation)
