= Queensbury Mill =

- U.S. National Register of Historic Places
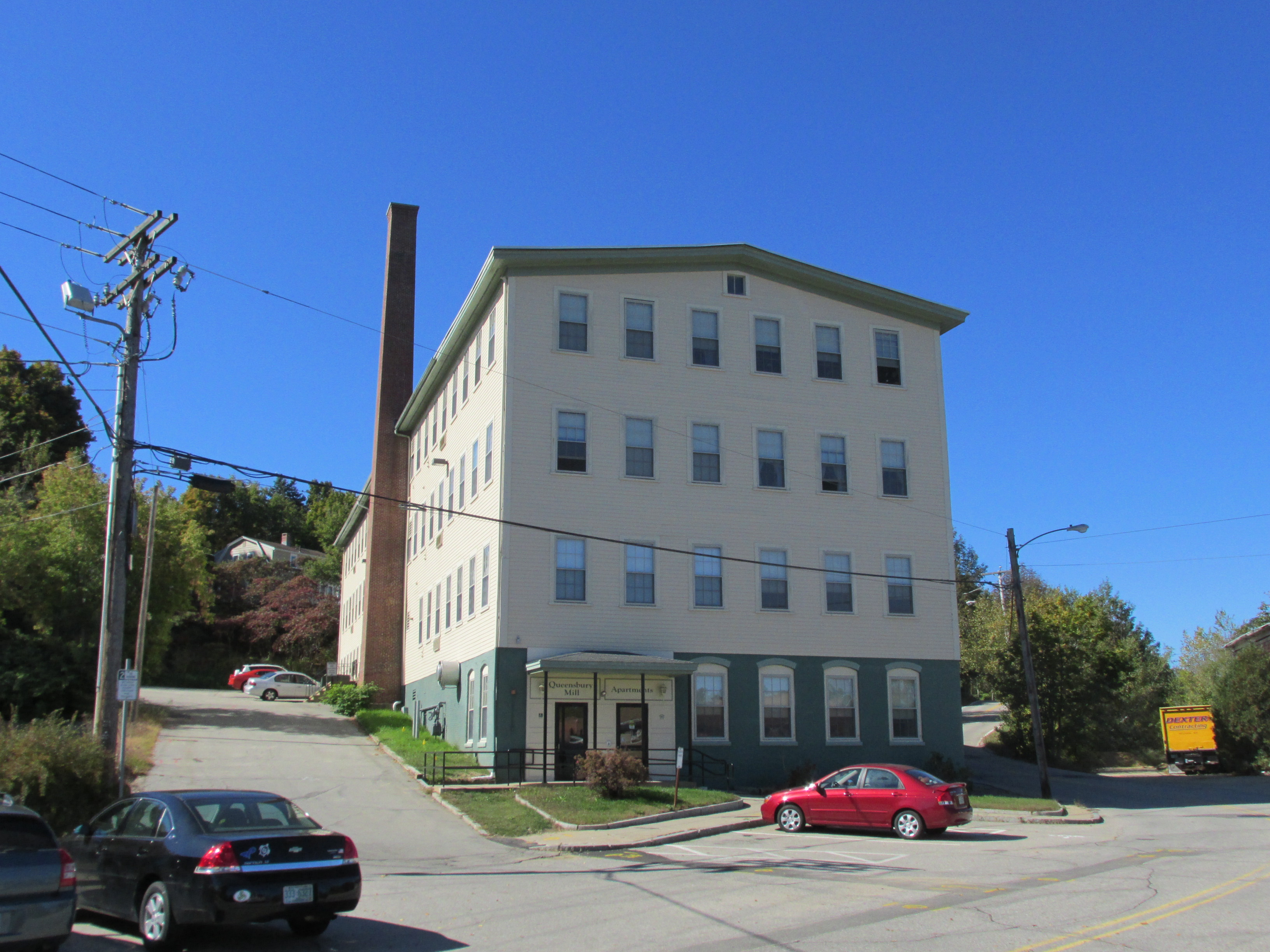

- Location within New Hampshire Location within the United States
- Location: 1 Market St., Somersworth, New Hampshire
- Coordinates: 43°15′54″N 70°51′58″W
- Area: less than one acre
- Built: 1884
- Architects: Fellows, Isaac
- NRHP reference No.: 86003362
- Added to NRHP: April 10, 1987

The Queensbury Mill is a historic mill building at 1 Market Street in Somersworth, New Hampshire. Built in 1884, it is unusual for the period for its wood-frame construction, and for its financing, executed by local businessmen to attract shoe manufacturers to the city. The mill was listed on the National Register of Historic Places in 1987. The building has been converted into apartments.

== Description and history ==
The Queensbury Mill is located on the west side of downtown Somersworth, extending along the south side of Winter Street between its junctions with Market and Linden Streets. It is a wood-frame structure, 171 feet (52 m) in length, with a gabled roof, and a full-height brick basement level, providing a full four stories of space. A brick chimney rises near the center of its length, near a projecting stair house which rises above the main roof line.

The mill was built in 1884 and enlarged in 1892, and was owned by a consortium of local business leaders. They sought to diversify the city's economy by attracting shoe manufacturers, who were dealing with a period of labor unrest in the major shoe-producing centers of Massachusetts. Built by local craftsmen, the mill is unusual for its wood-frame construction, which was not the norm for mill buildings of the 1880s, and it lacks other features typically added to these buildings to limit the spread of fire. The building housed a shoe manufacturing operation until 1902, when it was taken over by the Queensbury Mills of Worcester, Massachusetts and converted to yarn production. The initiative to attract shoe manufacturing was broadly successful, however: the Somersworth Shoe Company operated in buildings formerly of the Great Falls Manufacturing Company until 1984.

== See also ==
- Woodbury Mill: another historic shoe factory in New Hampshire.
- National Register of Historic Places listings in Strafford County, New Hampshire
