= Queensberry Hotel, Dumfries =

Coordinates: 55°04′05″N 3°36′33″W

Queensberry Hotel
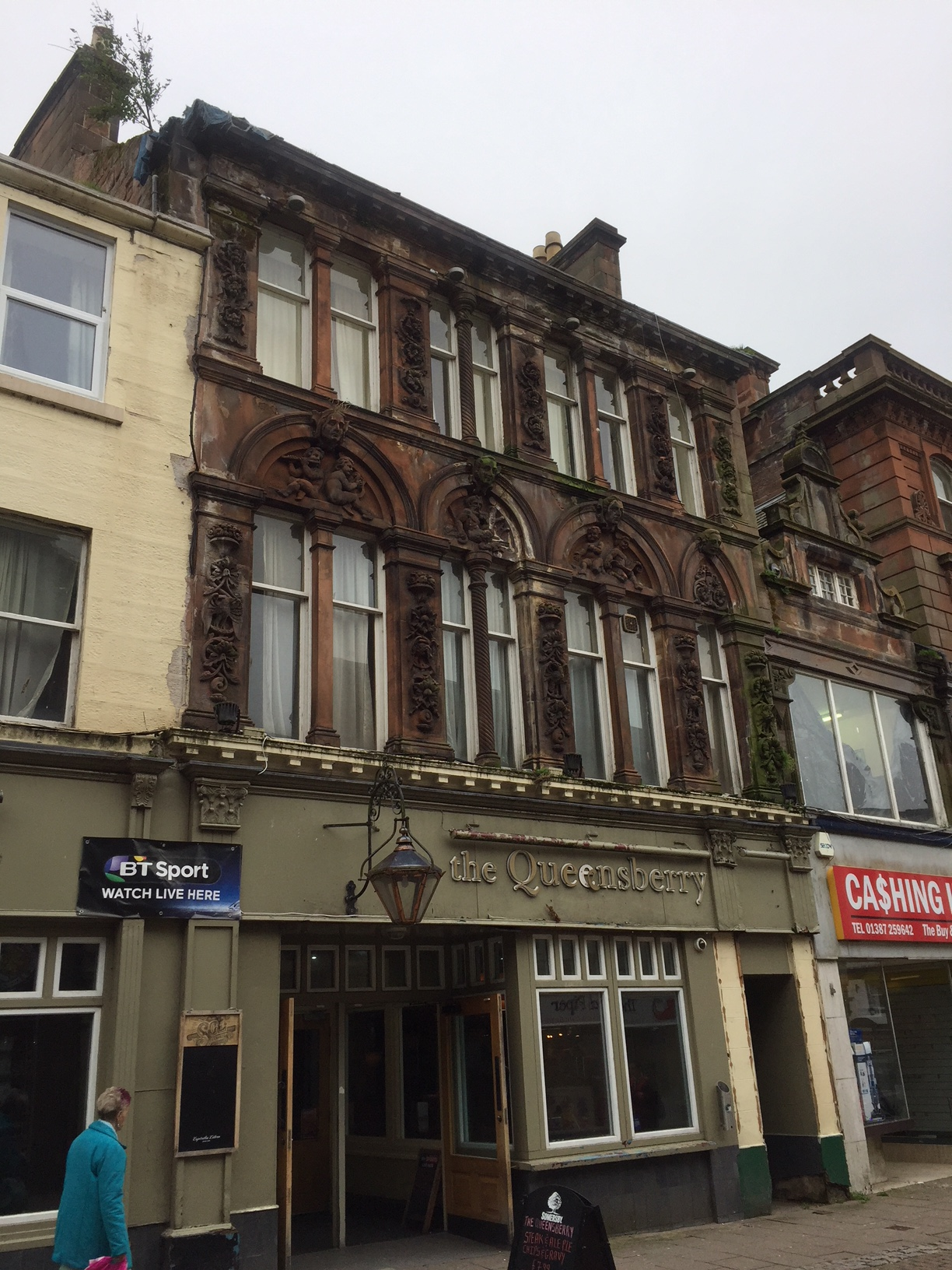

General information
- Location: Dumfries, Scotland
- Address: English Street, Dumfries
- Opened: 1869

Design and construction
- Architect(s): James Barbour

The Queensberry Hotel is a Category B listed building in Dumfries, Scotland. It is notable for the ornate carved sandstone facade, and for its historical connection to the development of musical culture in the local area.

== History ==
Commissioned by and built in 1869 by Mr. John Joseph Fryer, a 'music seller' who lived in at 25 Queen Street. The building was built in 1869 from plans drafted by local architect James Barbour. The stonemason who carved the ornate front of the building was William Flint, who had a successful workshop at Saint Mary's Place, Dumfries.

== Stonecarving ==
The carvings on the facade of the building are an example of the high quality of local sandstone carving, in particular that of prolific local sculptor William Flint.

The front of the hotel originally included arched windows with eight carved heads, with four heads located over the ground floor windows and four over the first floor. The front also features cherubs, a satyr playing the pan flutes, floral designs, eagles, and keystones carved as human heads. The ground floor carvings have since been removed and the front of the building modernised.

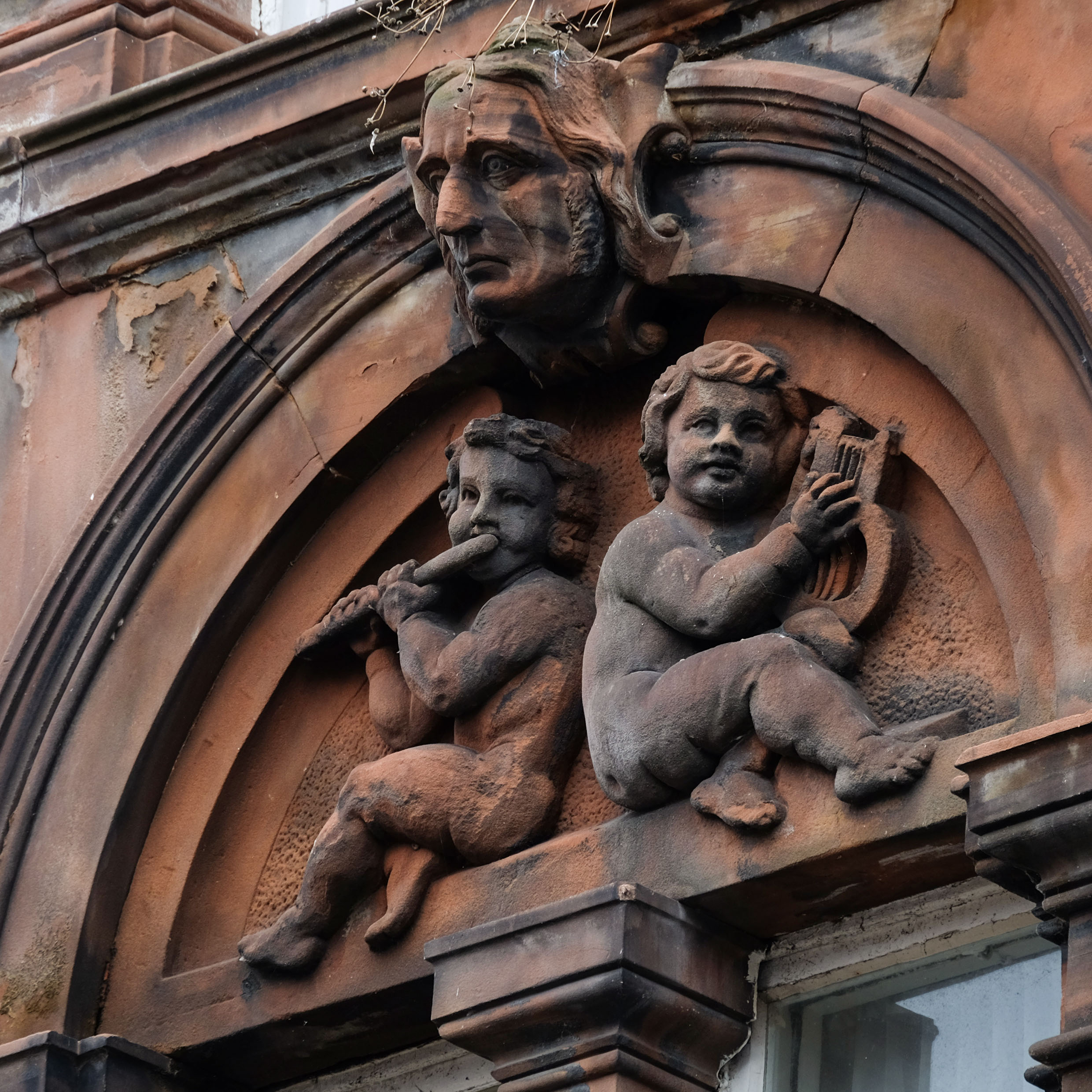

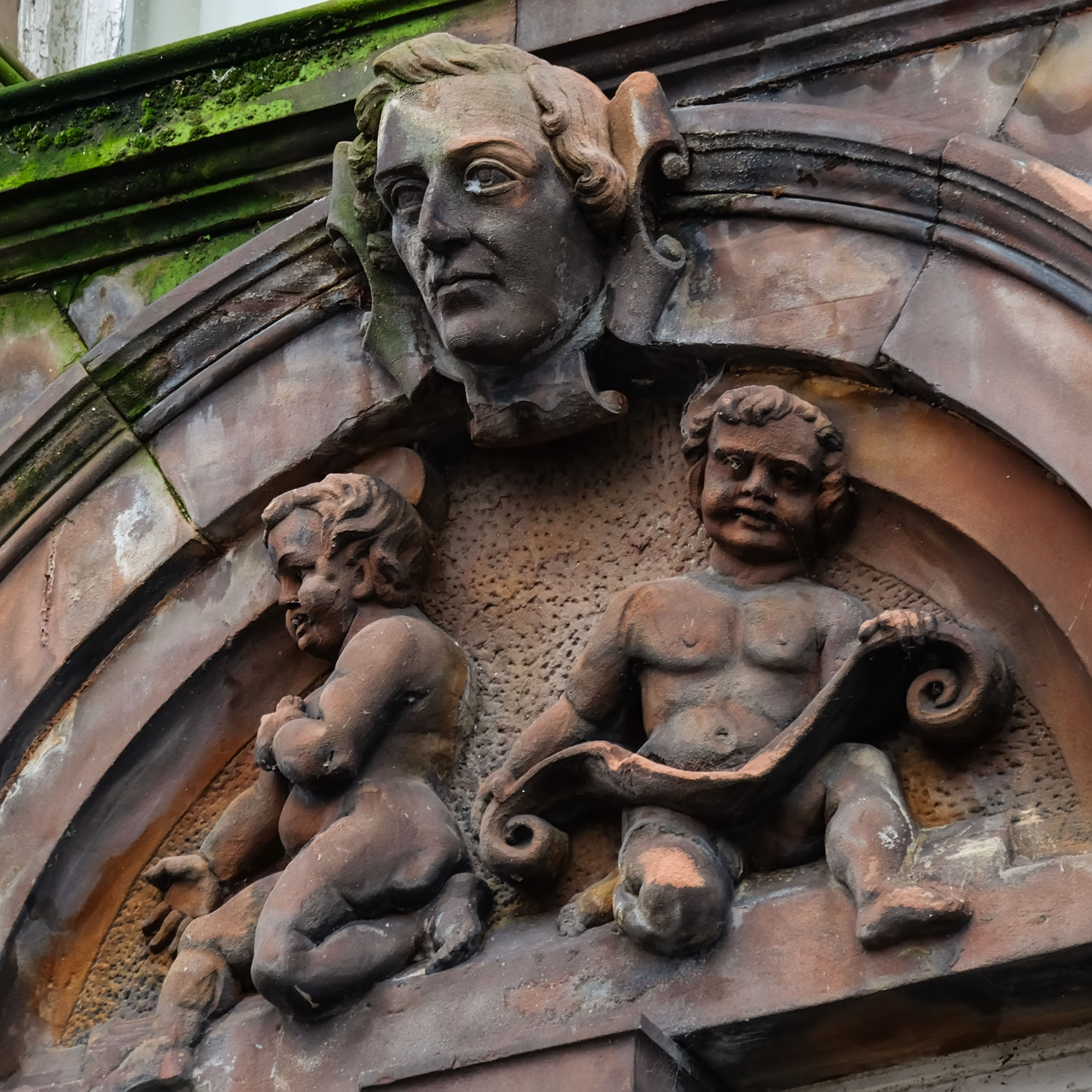

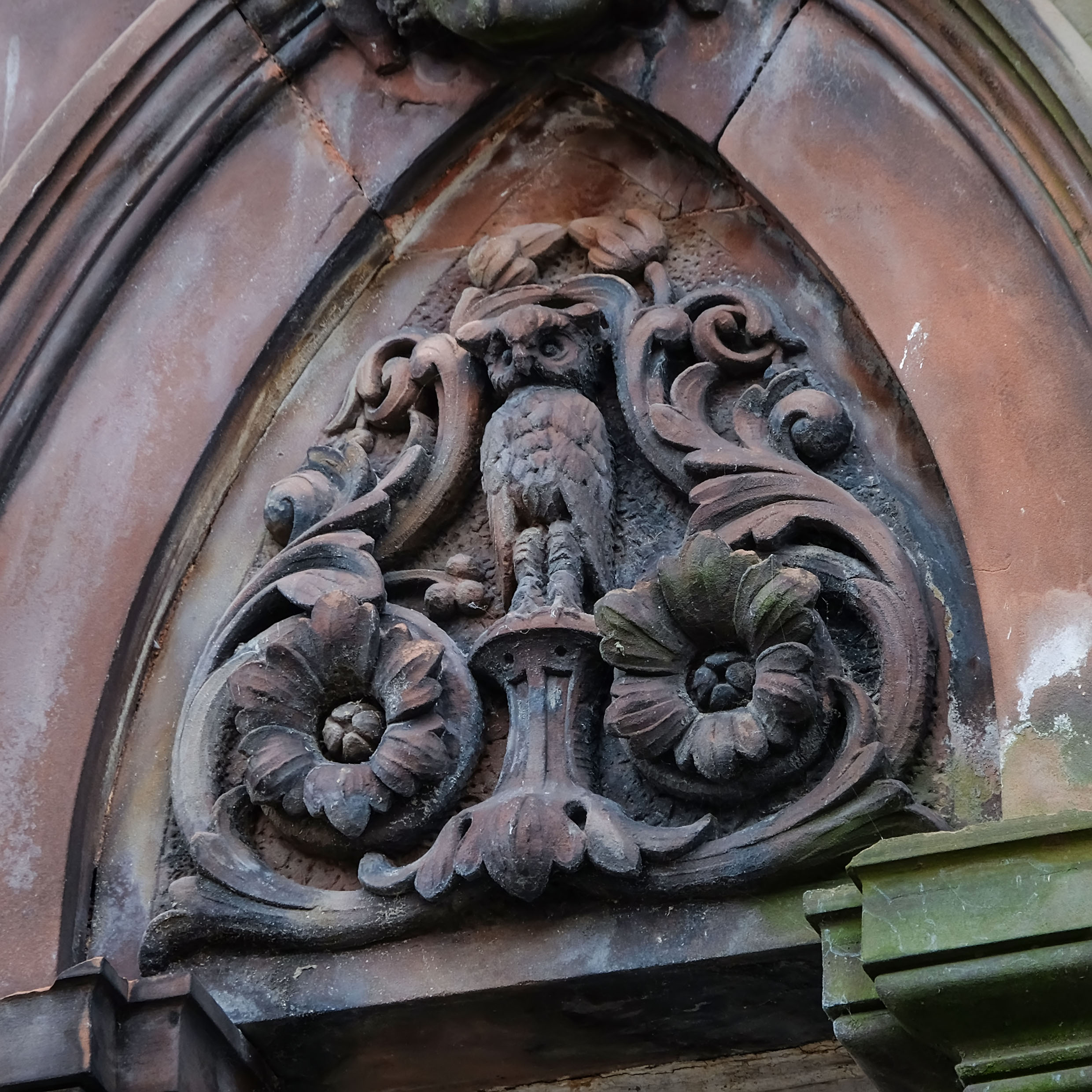

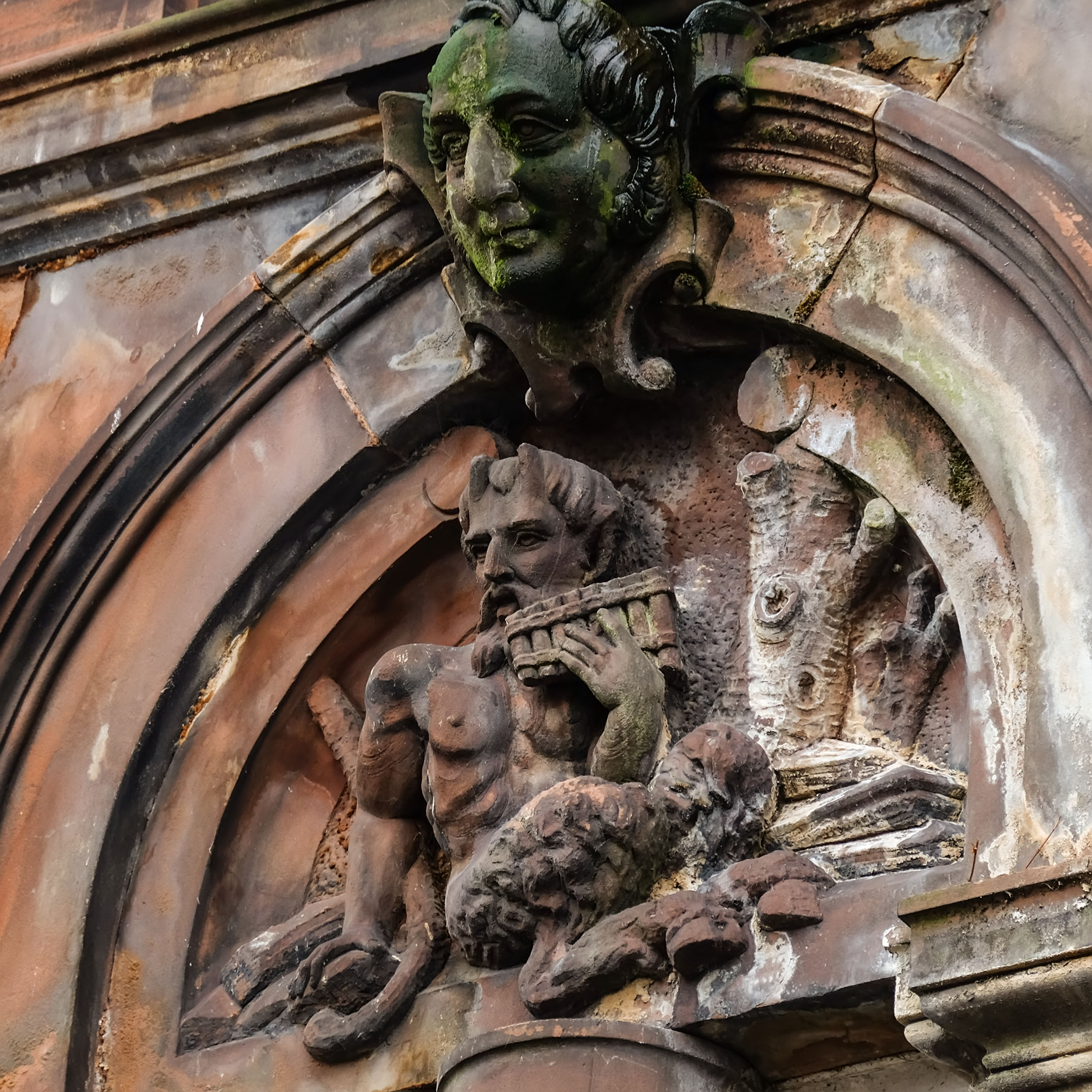

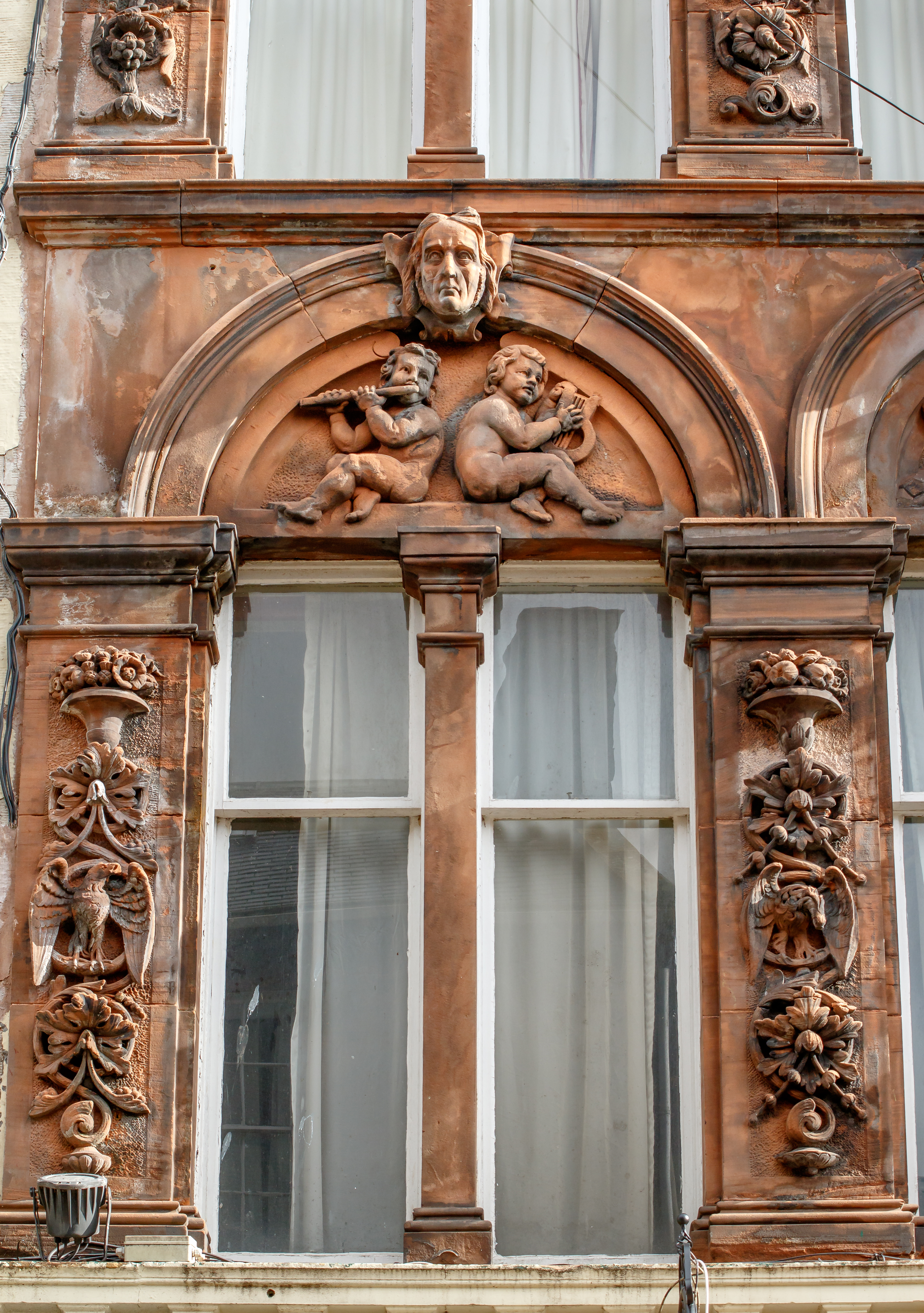

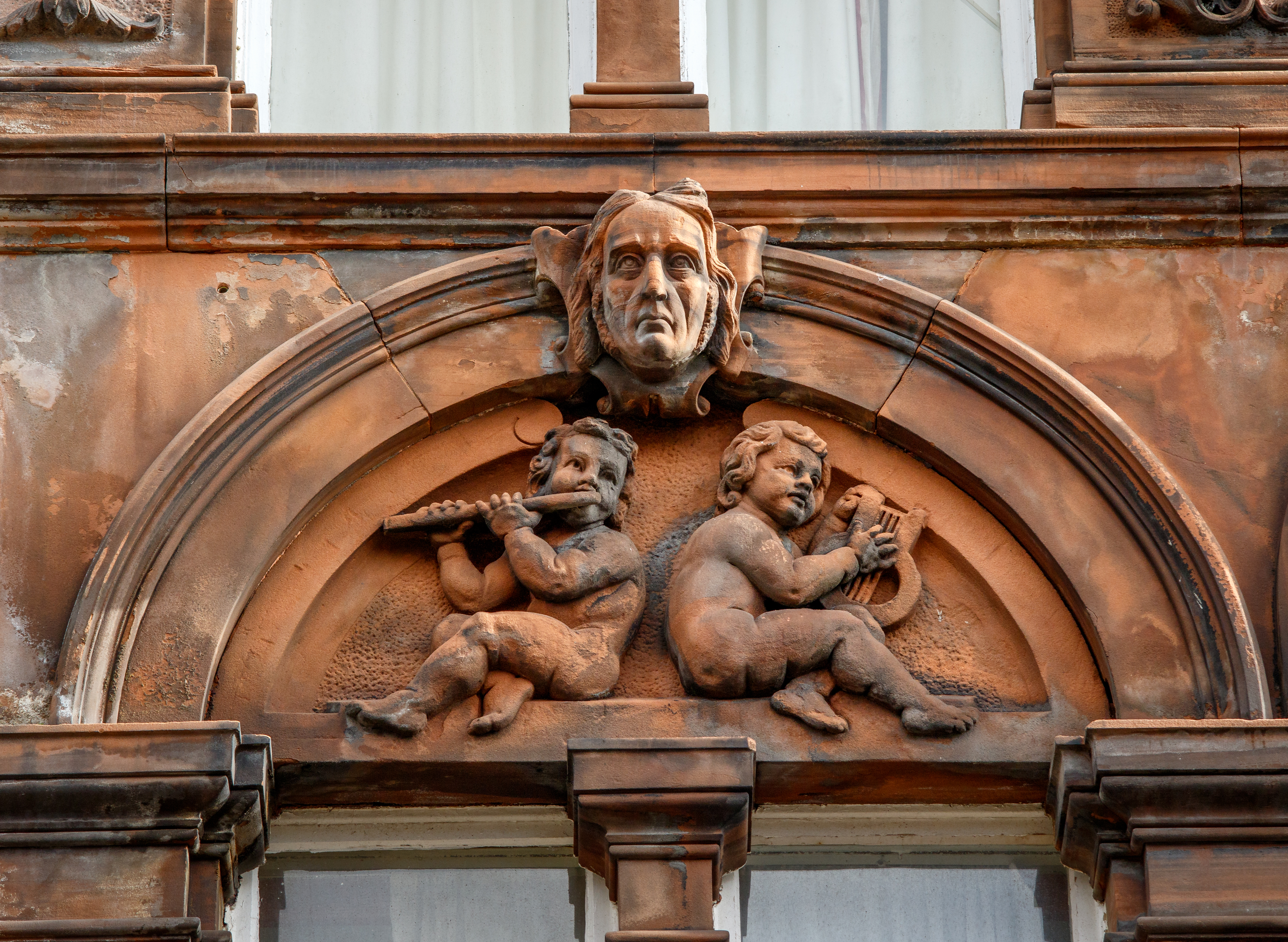

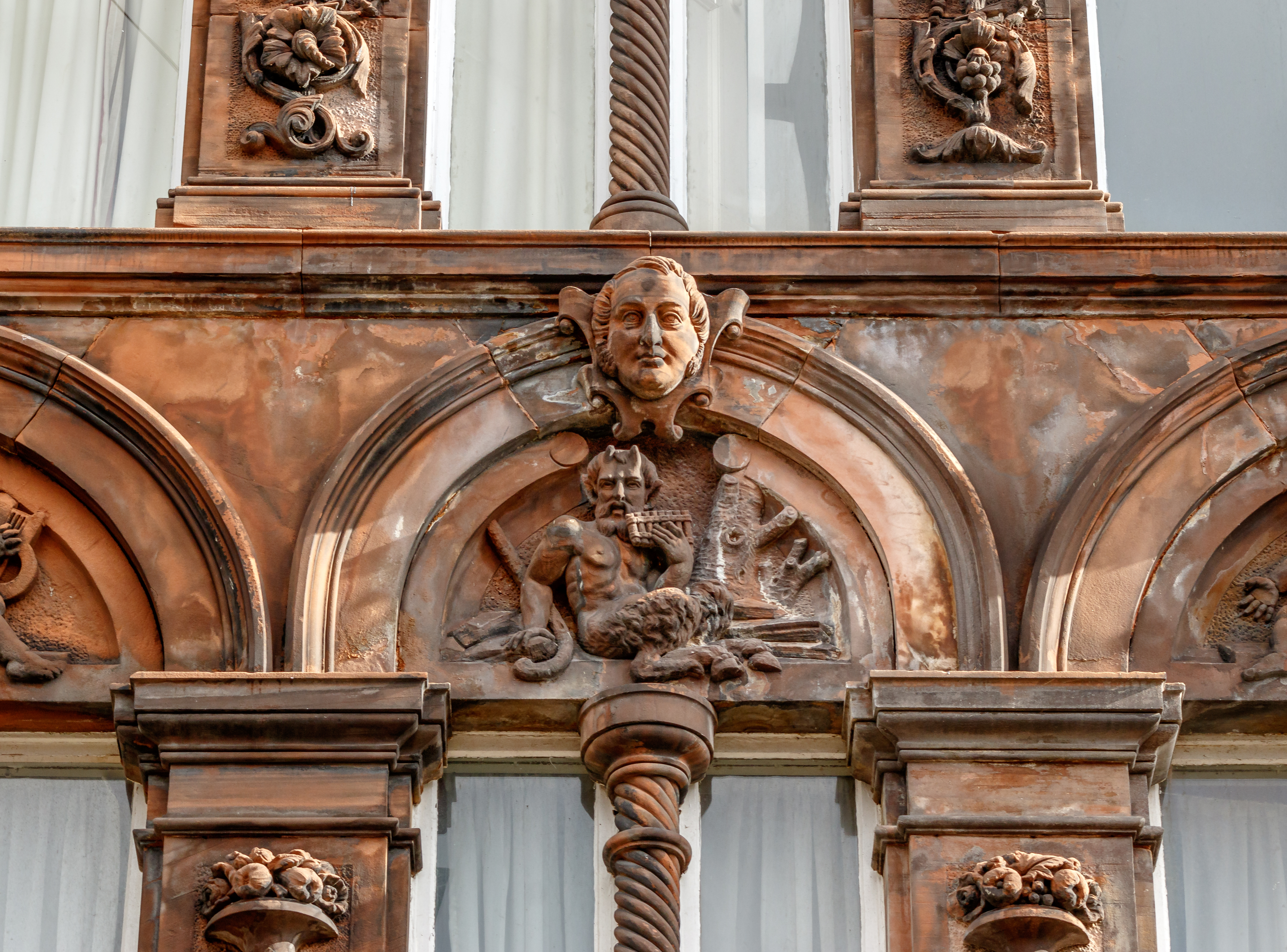

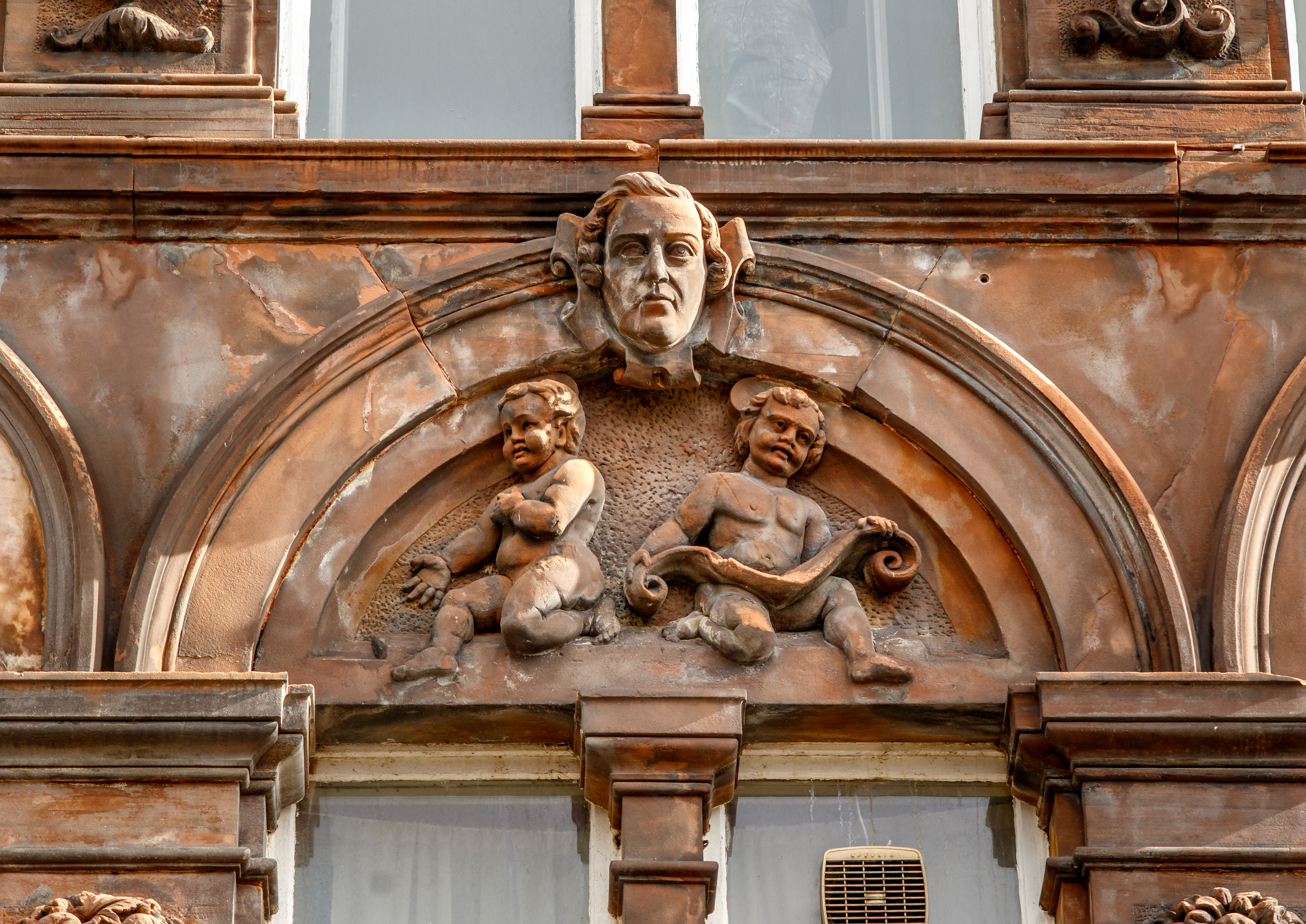

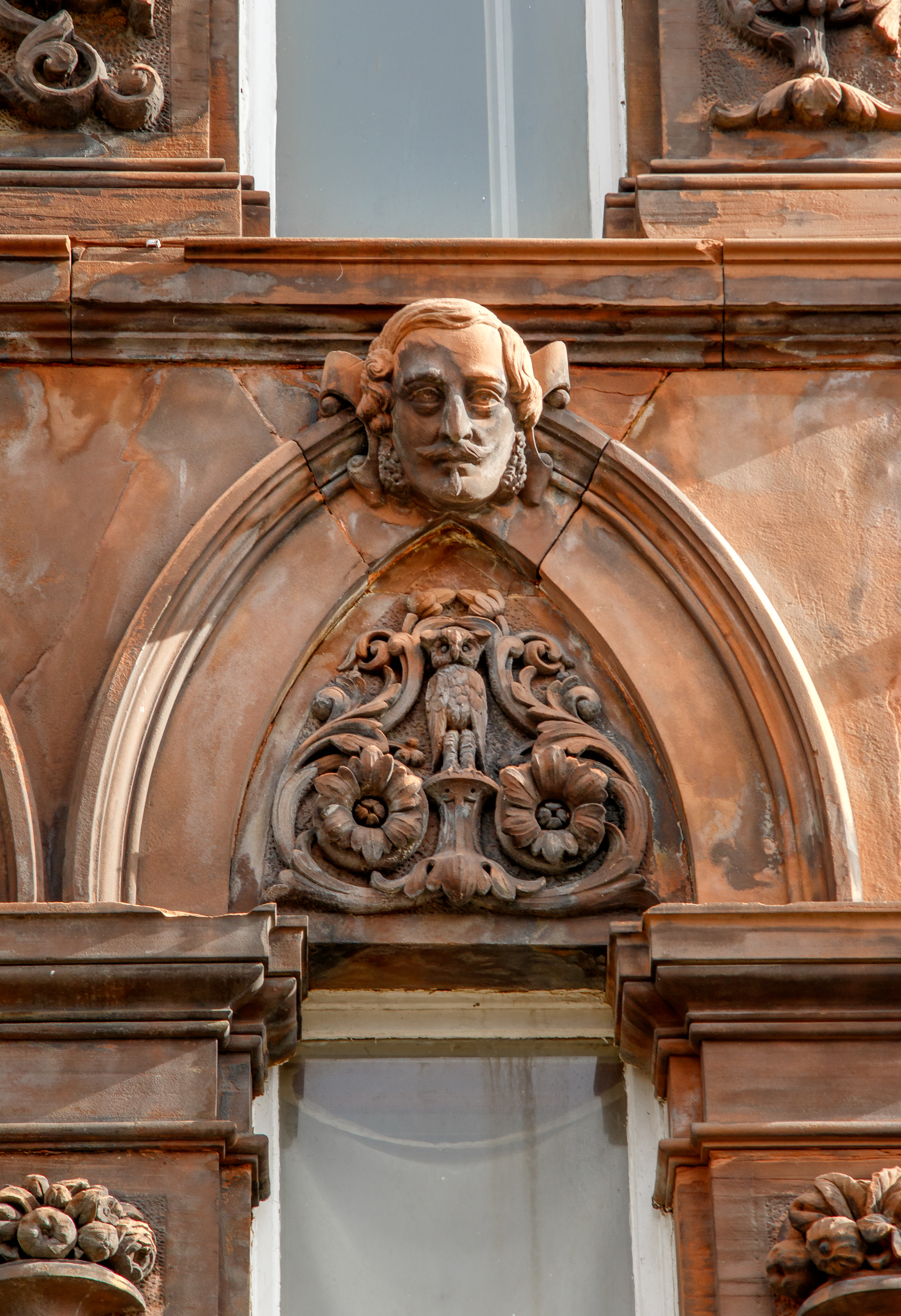

== Kidnapping ==
The hotel was the site of a kidnapping in 1871, reported in several national newspapers. Retired Manx businessman Thomas Wilson was tricked into stopping at the hotel, and from there getting into a carriage to make a visit to a local house. Upon arrival, it became evident that the house was in fact a local insane asylum, the Royal Crichton Institute.
