= 2011 Kirklees Metropolitan Borough Council election =

2011 UK local government election

The 2011 Kirklees Metropolitan Borough Council election was held on Thursday 5 May 2011 to elect 23 members to the Kirklees Metropolitan Borough Council, the same day as other local elections in the United Kingdom. It elected one-third of the council's 69 members to a four-year term. The council remained under no overall control.

== Results summary ==
2011 Kirklees Metropolitan Borough Council election
Party	This election			Full council			This election		
Party	Seats	Net	Seats %	Other	Total	Total %	Votes	Votes %	+/−
Labour	10	▲3	43.5	17	27	39.1	51,146	39.7	▲9.1
Conservative	8	▲2	34.8	14	22	31.9	38,598	30.0	▲0.5
Liberal Democrats	2	▼6	8.7	12	14	20.3	18,911	14.7	▼8.7
Green	2	Steady	8.7	2	4	5.8	13,232	10.3	▲4.4
Independent	1	▲1	4.3	1	2	2.9	3,533	2.7	▲0.3
TUSC	0	Steady	0.0	0	0	0.0	1,180	0.9	▲0.2
UKIP	0	Steady	0.0	0	0	0.0	984	0.8	New
BNP	0	Steady	0.0	0	0	0.0	923	0.7	▼6.9
English Democrat	0	Steady	0.0	0	0	0.0	276	0.2	New

== Ward results ==
=== Almondbury ===
Almondbury
Party	Candidate	Votes	%	±%
Liberal Democrats	James Blanchard	1,736	31.7	▼5.2
Conservative	Janice Thomas	1,400	25.6	▼0.1
Labour	Elliott Ledsam	1,322	24.2	▲10.8
Green	Eileen Marchant	677	12.4	▲5.9
BNP	Tony Leach	230	4.2	▼5.8
TUSC	Craig Fennell	105	1.9	New
Majority		336	6.1	▼5.1
Total valid votes		5,470	40.9	
Registered electors		13,542		
Liberal Democrats hold		Swing	▼2.6	

=== Ashbrow ===
Ashbrow
Party	Candidate	Votes	%	±%
Labour	Cath Harris*	2,817	52.5	▲11.1
Conservative	Bill Armer	1,871	34.8	▲3.6
Liberal Democrats	Manjit Singh	397	7.4	▼0.6
Green	Sharon Fallows	285	5.3	▼0.3
Majority		946	17.6	▲7.4
Total valid votes		5,395	39.7	
Registered electors		13,791		
Labour hold		Swing	▲3.8	

=== Batley East ===
Batley East
Party	Candidate	Votes	%	±%
Labour	Amanda Stubley	3,834	67.2	▲18.5
Conservative	Mohammed Laher	1,028	18.0	▲3.1
Liberal Democrats	Jon Bloom	333	5.8	▼14.2
Independent	Mark Griffin	295	5.2	New
Green	Peter Cunnington	212	3.7	▲0.5
Majority		2,806	49.2	▲39.0
Total valid votes		5,702	45.5	
Registered electors		12,804		
Labour hold		Swing	▲7.7	

=== Batley West ===
Batley West
Party	Candidate	Votes	%	±%
Labour	Peter O'Neill*	3,376	64.3	▲24.9
Conservative	John Birkenshaw	1,302	24.8	▲4.6
Green	Matt Blakeley	317	6.0	▲2.1
Liberal Democrats	Irfan Iqbal	252	4.8	▼13.3
Majority		2,074	39.5	▲20.3
Total valid votes		5,247	40.5	
Registered electors		13,157		
Labour hold		Swing	▲10.2	

=== Birstall and Birkenshaw ===
Birstall and Birkenshaw
Party	Candidate	Votes	%	±%
Conservative	Robert Light*	2,642	53.2	▲5.0
Labour	Michael Williams	1,640	33.0	▲9.6
Green	Clive Lord	368	7.4	▲2.1
Liberal Democrats	Suzy Brain England	317	6.4	▲0.4
Majority		1,002	20.2	▼4.6
Total valid votes		4,967	40.9	
Registered electors		12,503		
Conservative hold		Swing	▼2.3	

=== Cleckheaton ===
Cleckheaton
Party	Candidate	Votes	%	±%
Liberal Democrats	Andrew Pinnock*	2,237	42.8	▼4.3
Conservative	David Pinder	1,389	26.6	▲10.7
Labour	Dan Howard	1,316	25.2	▲17.1
Green	Robert Barraclough	283	5.4	▲3.7
Majority		848	16.2	▼3.8
Total valid votes		5,225	41.3	
Registered electors		12,856		
Liberal Democrats hold		Swing	▼7.5	

=== Colne Valley ===
Colne Valley
Party	Candidate	Votes	%	±%
Conservative	Donna Bellamy	1,656	28.9	▲9.7
Labour	Tabatha Ellam	1,554	27.1	▲14.9
Liberal Democrats	Lynn Bradbury	1,425	24.8	▼17.8
Green	Chayley Collis	559	9.7	▲0.6
UKIP	Melanie Roberts	543	9.5	New
Majority		102	1.8	N/A
Total valid votes		5,771	43.8	
Registered electors		13,273		
Conservative gain from Liberal Democrats		Swing	▼2.6	

=== Crosland Moor and Netherton ===
Crosland Moor and Netherton
Party	Candidate	Votes	%	±%
Labour	Mohammad Sarwar*	2,754	47.0	▲9.5
Conservative	Louisa Waple	1,151	19.7	▲8.7
TUSC	Jackie Grunsell	866	14.8	New
Liberal Democrats	Mahmood Hussain	574	9.8	▼6.8
Green	Chas Ball	511	8.7	▲4.7
Majority		1,603	27.4	▲12.2
Total valid votes		5,856	45.1	
Registered electors		13,196		
Labour hold		Swing	▲0.4	

=== Dalton ===
Dalton
Party	Candidate	Votes	%	±%
Labour	Cliff Preest	2,243	48.0	▲18.9
Liberal Democrats	Roger Battye*	1,072	22.9	▼12.1
Conservative	Chris Meadows	892	19.1	▲3.4
Green	David Honour	468	10.0	▲5.3
Majority		1,171	25.0	N/A
Total valid votes		4,675	37.2	
Registered electors		12,758		
Labour gain from Liberal Democrats		Swing	▲15.5	

=== Denby Dale ===
Denby Dale
Party	Candidate	Votes	%	±%
Conservative	Elaine Ward*	2,514	41.1	▼0.2
Labour	Graham Turner	2,285	37.4	▲7.3
Green	Terry Sigsworth	443	7.2	Steady
Liberal Democrats	Craig Armistead	392	6.4	▼1.9
English Democrat	Paul McEnhill	276	4.5	▼1.5
BNP	Rachel Firth	206	3.4	▼3.6
Majority		229	3.7	▼7.5
Total valid votes		6,140	49.0	
Registered electors		12,663		
Conservative hold		Swing	▼3.8	

=== Dewsbury East ===
Dewsbury East
Party	Candidate	Votes	%	±%
Labour	Eric Firth*	2,739	51.6	▲15.5
Conservative	Mark Eastwood	1,150	21.7	▲15.3
Liberal Democrats	Dennis Hullock	776	14.6	▼6.7
UKIP	Greg Burrows	441	8.3	New
Green	Tony Kelsall	203	3.8	▲2.3
Majority		1,589	29.9	▲28.5
Total valid votes		5,309	40.0	
Registered electors		13,486		
Labour hold		Swing	▲0.1	

=== Dewsbury South ===
Dewsbury South
Party	Candidate	Votes	%	±%
Conservative	Salim Patel*	2,577	43.0	▲9.3
Labour	Naheed Arshad-Mather	1,896	31.6	▲0.1
Independent	Chris Kennedy	822	13.7	New
Green	Adrian Cruden	287	4.8	▲0.5
Liberal Democrats	Bernard Disken	224	3.7	▼1.7
Independent	Shaun Maddox	189	3.2	New
Majority		681	11.4	▲9.2
Total valid votes		5,995	47.4	
Registered electors		12,890		
Conservative hold		Swing	▲4.6	

=== Dewsbury West ===
Dewsbury West
Party	Candidate	Votes	%	±%
Labour	Darren O'Donovan	2,918	50.8	▲20.9
Liberal Democrats	Naz Hussain*	2,118	36.9	▼9.3
Conservative	Christophe Walker	502	8.7	▲3.4
Green	Andrew Stimson	202	3.5	▲1.5
Majority		800	13.9	N/A
Total valid votes		5,740	45.2	
Registered electors		12,971		
Labour gain from Liberal Democrats		Swing	▲15.1	

=== Golcar ===
Golcar
Party	Candidate	Votes	%	±%
Labour	Hilary Richards	1,769	33.6	▲13.1
Liberal Democrats	Robert Iredale*	1,567	29.7	▼9.8
Conservative	Clinton Simpson	857	16.3	▲4.4
Green	Daniel Greenwood	384	7.3	▲1.2
Independent	David Hill	340	6.5	New
BNP	Skye Turner	292	5.5	▼16.6
TUSC	Matt Moll	59	1.1	New
Majority		202	3.8	N/A
Total valid votes		5,292	39.4	
Registered electors		13,559		
Labour gain from Liberal Democrats		Swing	▲11.5	

=== Greenhead ===
Greenhead
Party	Candidate	Votes	%	±%
Labour	Judith Hughes	4,117	65.0	▲5.9
Conservative	Robert McGuin	972	15.3	▲1.5
Liberal Democrats	Mohammed Haleem	718	11.3	▲2.6
Green	Michelle Atkinson	526	8.3	▼1.2
Majority		3,145	49.7	▲4.4
Total valid votes		6,379	46.2	
Registered electors		13,949		
Labour hold		Swing	▲2.2	

=== Heckmondwike ===
Heckmondwike
Party	Candidate	Votes	%	±%
Labour	Paul Sheard*	3,403	70.1	▲25.4
Conservative	Mark Roberts	873	18.0	▲1.8
Green	David Brooks	320	6.6	New
Liberal Democrats	Josie Pugsley	257	5.3	▼1.2
Majority		2,530	52.1	▲40.0
Total valid votes		4,853	38.9	
Registered electors		12,699		
Labour hold		Swing	▲11.8	

=== Holme Valley North ===
Holme Valley North
Party	Candidate	Votes	%	±%
Independent	Edgar Holroyd-Doveton	1,887	31.7	New
Conservative	Basil Smith	1,539	25.8	▼0.5
Liberal Democrats	David Woodhead*	1,097	18.4	▼9.5
Labour	Ian Leedham	931	15.6	▲6.7
Green	Barry Ward	507	8.5	▲2.8
Majority		348	5.8	N/A
Total valid votes		5,961	47.7	
Registered electors		12,665		
Independent gain from Liberal Democrats		Swing	▲16.1	

=== Holme Valley South ===
Holme Valley South
Party	Candidate	Votes	%	±%
Conservative	Ken Sims*	3,201	48.8	▼0.2
Labour	Steven Morris	1,808	27.6	▲10.7
Green	Sue Macklin	794	12.1	▼1.7
Liberal Democrats	Oliver Constance	751	11.5	▼1.1
Majority		1,393	21.3	▼10.8
Total valid votes		6,604	46.6	
Registered electors		14,360		
Conservative hold		Swing	▼5.5	

=== Kirkburton ===
Kirkburton
Party	Candidate	Votes	%	±%
Green	Derek Hardcastle*	2,221	38.8	▼4.6
Conservative	Amanda Shaw	2,139	37.4	▲2.8
Labour	Mike Greetham	1,040	18.2	▲7.0
BNP	Carol Dixon	195	3.4	▼2.4
Liberal Democrats	Jatinder Singh	127	2.2	▼1.0
Majority		82	1.4	▼7.4
Total valid votes		5,747	44.8	
Registered electors		12,888		
Green hold		Swing	▼3.7	

=== Lindley ===
Lindley
Party	Candidate	Votes	%	±%
Conservative	Tony Brice	2,379	39.3	▲9.5
Liberal Democrats	Anthony Woodhead*	1,650	27.3	▼14.6
Labour	Douglas Morgan	1,487	24.6	▲12.0
Green	Richard Plunkett	531	8.8	▲2.8
Majority		729	12.1	N/A
Total valid votes		6,081	44.0	
Registered electors		13,936		
Conservative gain from Liberal Democrats		Swing	▲12.1	

=== Liversedge and Gomersal ===
Liversedge and Gomersal
Party	Candidate	Votes	%	±%
Conservative	Lisa Holmes	2,467	46.7	▲5.2
Labour	Gordon North	2,189	41.5	▲22.1
Green	Karen Allison	334	6.3	▲2.3
Liberal Democrats	Richard Farnhill	290	5.5	▼2.0
Majority		278	5.3	▼8.6
Total valid votes		5,280	39.0	
Registered electors		13,735		
Conservative hold		Swing	▼8.5	

=== Mirfield ===
Mirfield
Party	Candidate	Votes	%	±%
Conservative	Kathleen Taylor*	3,561	53.9	▲7.2
Labour	Karen Rowling	2,325	35.2	▲20.8
Liberal Democrats	Brian Firth	376	5.7	Steady
Green	Cassandra Whittingham	350	5.3	▲2.4
Majority		1,236	18.7	▼3.9
Total valid votes		6,612	44.5	
Registered electors		15,089		
Conservative hold		Swing	▼6.8	

=== Newsome ===
Newsome
Party	Candidate	Votes	%	±%
Green	Julie Stewart-Turner*	2,450	51.6	▼1.1
Labour	Mohammed Saeed	1,383	29.2	▲3.0
Conservative	Jas Virdee	536	11.3	▼2.4
Liberal Democrats	Philip Scott	225	4.7	▼2.8
TUSC	Ian Slattery	150	3.2	New
Majority		1,067	22.5	▼4.0
Total valid votes		4,777	34.6	
Registered electors		13,955		
Green hold		Swing	▼2.1	
