= 1973 Kirklees Metropolitan Borough Council election =

1973 local election in Kirklees

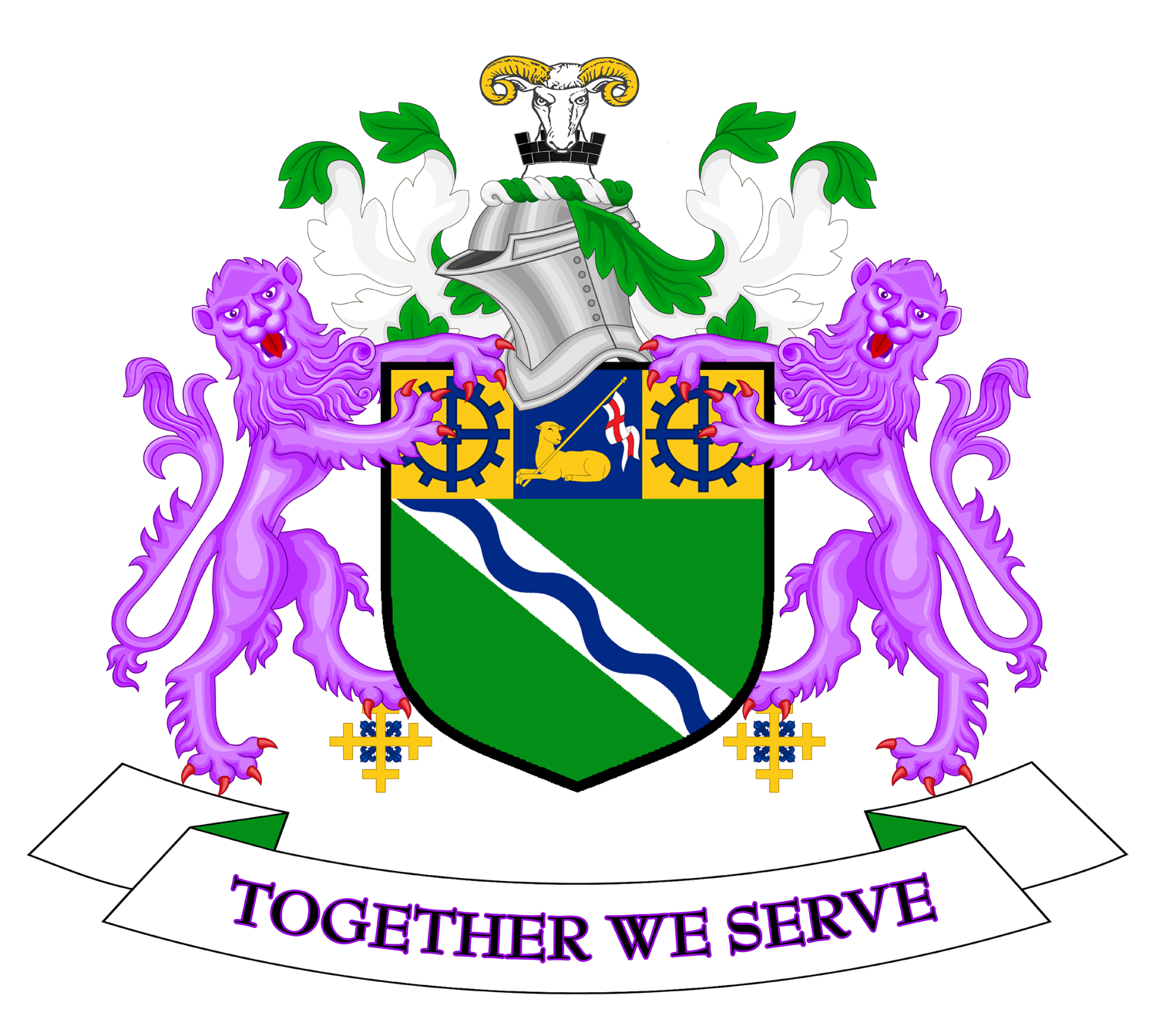
- 10 May 1973

72 of 72 seats on Kirklees Metropolitan Borough Council 37 seats needed for a majority
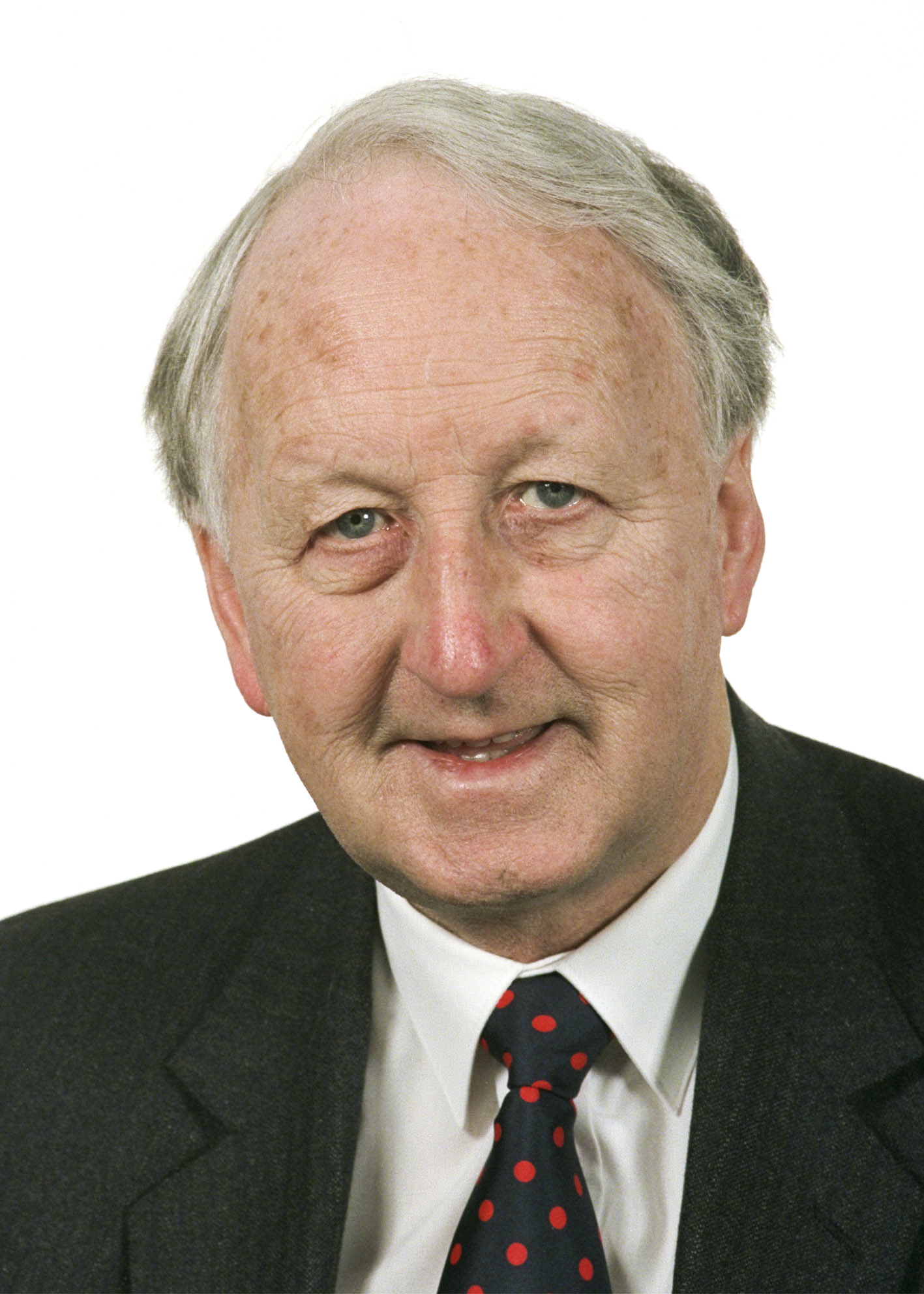
	First party	Second party	Third party
		Con	Lib
Leader	Thomas Megahy
Party	Labour	Conservative	Liberal
Leader's seat	Mirfield
Seats before	0	0	0
Seats won	45	18	8
Seats after	45	18	8
Seat change	▲45	▲18	▲8
Leader before election
Authority created
Leader after election
Thomas Megahy
Labour

The 1973 Kirklees Metropolitan Borough Council election took place on 10 May 1973 alongside other local elections across the United Kingdom. All 72 seats of Kirklees Council were elected.

The Labour Party won a majority on the newly formed council, with Thomas Megahy becoming the first leader of the council.

== Background ==
The Local Government Act 1972 abolished previous existing local government structures, and created a two-tier system of counties and districts everywhere. Some of the new counties were designated metropolitan counties, containing metropolitan boroughs instead. The allocation of functions differed between the metropolitan and the non-metropolitan areas (the so-called "shire counties") – for example, education and social services were the responsibility of the shire counties, but in metropolitan areas was given to the districts

The metropolitan borough of Kirklees was formed from the combination of Batley, Dewsbury and Huddersfield following the passing of the act, coming under West Yorkshire County Council.

For its first year it was a "shadow authority", acting alongside the area's outgoing authorities, until the new administrative areas and their councils formally came into being on 1 April 1974.

== Composition ==
1973 Kirklees Council election
Party	Seats
Labour	45
Conservative	18
Liberal Democrats	8
Independent	1

== Ward Results ==
=== Crosland Moor ===
Crosland Moor
Party	Candidate	Votes	%	±%
Conservative	T. Cliffe	2,130	34.4	
Labour	S. Dawson	2,056	33.2	
Labour	Dawson	1,984		
Labour	D. Middleton	1,880		
Liberal	Middleton	1,869	30.2	
Liberal	H. Dugdale	1,769		
Conservative	C. Dyson	1,614		
Liberal	Turner	1,497		
Conservative	Pickles	1,491		
National Front	Shaw	143	2.3	
Turnout			48.3	
Rejected ballots				
Registered electors				
Conservative win (new seat)				
Labour win (new seat)				
Labour win (new seat)				

=== Dewsbury South ===
Dewsbury South
Party	Candidate	Votes	%	±%
Labour	A. Ramsden	2,484	53.5	
Labour	Gowan	2,317		
Labour	H. Oldroyd	2,296		
Liberal	Fuller	1,078	23.2	
Conservative	S. Amott	1,077	23.2	
Liberal	Leak	1,023		
Turnout			41.0	
Rejected ballots				
Registered electors				
Labour win (new seat)				
Labour win (new seat)				
Labour win (new seat)				

=== No. 10 (Huddersfield: Longwood-Milnsbridge-Paddock) ===
Longwood, Milnsbridge and Paddock
Party	Candidate	Votes	%	±%
Labour	Hartley	2,457	29.2	
Conservative	M. Newbould	2,397	28.5	
Labour	L. Jardine	2,322		
Labour	K. Mathieson	2,176		
Labour	Barwick	2,166		
[[PR|PRCategory:All articles with links needing disambiguationCategory:Articles with links needing disambiguation from September 2026]]	Ainley	1,838	21.8	
Conservative	Turner	1,637		
Liberal	J. Adams	1,524	18.1	
Liberal	Smith	1,288		
Liberal	Growenor	1,050		
Independent conservative	Aslett	202	2.4	
Turnout			58.6	
Rejected ballots				
Registered electors				
Labour win (new seat)				
Conservative win (new seat)				
Labour win (new seat)				

=== No. 12 (Batley: East & Soothill) ===
Batley East and Soothill
Party	Candidate	Votes	%	±%
Labour	J. Wood	1,379	36.2	
Labour	C. Walker	1,316		
Liberal	Lockwood	1,232	32.3	
Labour	Jenkins	1,204		
Independent	Meson	1,203	31.5	
Independent	Burton	999		
Liberal	Dawson	806		
Turnout			41.8	
Rejected ballots				
Registered electors				
Labour win (new seat)				
Labour win (new seat)				
Liberal win (new seat)				

=== No. 13 (Batley: West) ===
Batley West
Party	Candidate	Votes	%	±%
Labour	B. Sheldon	1,158	62.0	
Labour	J. Laughlin	1,083		
Labour	L. Conlon	1,047		
Conservative	C. Shaw	710	38.0	
Conservative	Shaw	701		
Conservative	Beecroft	789		
Turnout			25.5	
Rejected ballots				
Registered electors				
Labour win (new seat)				
Labour win (new seat)				
Labour win (new seat)				

=== No. 14 (Batley: Birstall & North) ===
Birstall and Batley North
Party	Candidate	Votes	%	±%
Labour	Fellowes	2,007	44.0	
Labour	Sepight	1,966		
Labour	J. Hellowell	1,933		
Conservative	Fox	1,587	34.8	
Conservative	Newsome	1,513		
Conservative	Merrills	1,498		
Liberal	Evans	963	21.1	
Liberal	McCarthy	906		
Liberal	Halloworth	859		
Turnout			35.0	
Rejected ballots				
Registered electors				
Labour win (new seat)				
Labour win (new seat)				
Labour win (new seat)				

=== No. 15 (Spenborough: Hightown-Roberttown & Norrist) ===
Hightown, Roberttown and Norrist
Party	Candidate	Votes	%	±%
Labour	H. Leaper	2,211	42.6	
Labour	J. Walker	2,011		
Conservative	Brooke	1,976	38.0	
Labour	Fox	1,945		
Conservative	Cole	1,738		
Conservative	Ward	1,694		
Liberal	Durrans	1,009	19.4	
Liberal	Beaumont	946		
Liberal	Dawson	782		
Turnout			41.2	
Rejected ballots				
Registered electors				
Labour win (new seat)				
Labour win (new seat)				
Conservative win (new seat)				

=== No. 16 (Spenborough: Cleckheaton-Oakenshaw-Scholes) ===
Cleckheaton, Oakenshaw and Scholes
Party	Candidate	Votes	%	±%
Conservative	M. Harwood	2,306	41.8	
Labour	F. Alliat	2,149	38.9	
Labour	D. Chesterman	2,115		
Conservative	Ros	2,012		
Conservative	L. Kershaw	1,986		
Labour	Marshall	1,891		
Liberal	L. Smith	1,066	19.3	
Liberal	Cockerill	1,004		
Turnout			53.0	
Rejected ballots				
Registered electors				
Conservative win (new seat)				
Labour win (new seat)				
Labour win (new seat)				

=== No. 17 (Spenborough: Birkenshaw & Gomersal & Heckmondwike) ===
Birkenshaw, Gomersal and Heckmondwike
Party	Candidate	Votes	%	±%
Conservative	Thornton	2,745	52.7	
Conservative	A. Kilburn	2,738		
Conservative	K. Hird	2,722		
Labour	Dewhurst	2,466	47.3	
Labour	Smith	2,282		
Labour	Hepworth	2,207		
Turnout			36.8	
Rejected ballots				
Registered electors				
Conservative win (new seat)				
Conservative win (new seat)				
Conservative win (new seat)				

=== No. 18 (Colne Valley: East) ===
Colne Valley East
Party	Candidate	Votes	%	±%
Liberal	B. Fearnley	2,458	53.1	
Liberal	H. Senior	2,392		
Liberal	Sykes	2,267		
Labour	Jackson	2,170	46.9	
Labour	Fallas	2,155		
Labour	Ellis	1,925		
Turnout			50.2	
Rejected ballots				
Registered electors				
Liberal win (new seat)				
Liberal win (new seat)				
Liberal win (new seat)				

=== No. 19 (Colne Valley: Central-North-West) ===
Colne Valley Central, North and West
Party	Candidate	Votes	%	±%
Labour	J. Smith	1,726	37.2	
Independent	Buckley	1,514	32.6	
Liberal	Naylor	1,402	30.2	
Labour	W. Briggs	1,296		
Liberal	Sykes	1,288		
Labour	Whitwam	1,252		
Liberal	Clark	1,106		
Turnout			67.8	
Rejected ballots				
Registered electors				
Labour win (new seat)				
Independent win (new seat)				
Liberal win (new seat)				

=== No. 5 (Huddersfield: Almondbury) ===
Almondbury
Party	Candidate	Votes	%	±%
Labour	B. Murphy	2,152	47.2	
Conservative	G. Powner	2,128	46.7	
Conservative	L. Wood	2,066		
Labour	McBride	1,914		
Labour	Moorhouse	1,913		
Conservative	Asquith	1,908		
National Front	Brookes	187	4.1	
Communist	Beresford	94	2.1	
Turnout			47.1	
Rejected ballots				
Registered electors				
Labour win (new seat)				
Conservative win (new seat)				
Conservative win (new seat)				

=== No. 7 (Huddersfield: Newsome & Central) ===
Newsome and Central
Party	Candidate	Votes	%	±%
Labour	D. White	1,903	45.8	N/A
Labour	J. Richardson	1,881	–	–
Labour	Mennell	1,760	–	–
Liberal	Hasler	1,169	28.1	N/A
Conservative	B. Jenkins	1,083	26.1	N/A
Liberal	Scott	1,040	–	–
Conservative	Littlewood	1,007	–	–
Conservative	Parfitt	939	–	–
Liberal	Edinburgh	883	–	–
Majority		734	17.7	N/A
Registered electors		11,191		
Turnout			37.1	N/A
Labour win (new seat)				
Labour win (new seat)				
Labour win (new seat)				
