= Trinity Academy Bradford =

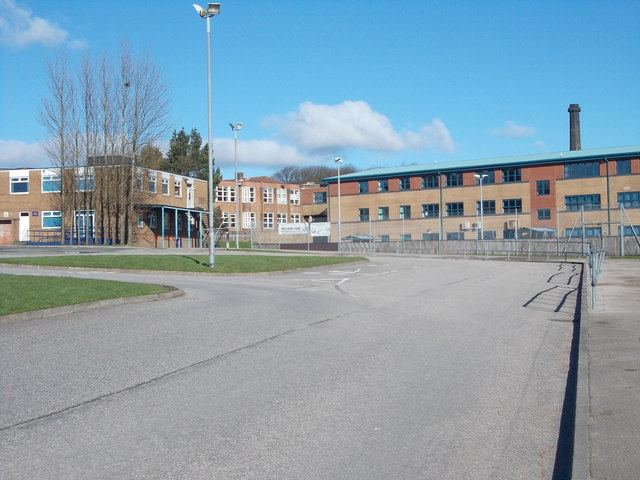
- Trinity Academy Bradford Secondary School

Location
- Deanstones Lane, Queensbury; Bradford, West Yorkshire, BD13 2AS; England
- Coordinates: 53.7651°N 1.8469°W

Information
- Other names: TAB
- Former name: Queensbury School, Queensbury Academy
- Type: Academy
- Motto: Empathy, Honesty, Respect, Responsibility
- Local authority: Bradford
- Trust: Trinity Multi Academy Trust (Trinity MAT)
- Department for Education URN: 148545 Tables
- Ofsted: Reports
- Principal: Tom Taylor
- Gender: Mixed
- Age range: 11–16
- Enrolment: 887 (2019)
- Capacity: 1,371
- Website: bradford.trinitymat.org

Trinity Academy Bradford (formerly Queensbury School and then Queensbury Academy) is an 11–16 mixed, secondary school located in Queensbury (near Bradford) in West Yorkshire, England. Trinity Academy Bradford has recently opened its doors to its all new state of the art building and is currently demolishing the old building.

Previously a foundation school administered by City of Bradford Metropolitan District Council, in September 2016, Queensbury School converted to academy status and was renamed Queensbury Academy. It was then sponsored by the Feversham Education Trust. It adopted its present name after becoming part of The Trinity Multi Academy Trust (Trinity MAT)

in February 2021.[2]
