= Newsome (ward) =

Electoral ward of Kirklees, England

Newsome Newsome and Central (1973–1982)
- Former ward Kirklees Council
- Boundary of Newsome; Newsome and Central (1973–1982) in Kirklees from 2018.
- Local government in England: West Yorkshire
- Population: 22,636 (2016)
- Electorate: 12,317 (2018)
- Major settlements: Newsome

1973–2026
- Number of councillors: 3
- Replaced by: Netherton and Newsome
- UK Parliament constituency: Huddersfield

Newsome (previously Newsome and Central, 1973 to 1982) is an electoral ward in Kirklees. Since 1973, it has elected three councillors to Kirklees Council.

== Councillors ==
Election	Councillor	Councillor	Councillor
1973	Mennell (Lab)	J. Richardson (Lab)	D. White (Lab)
1975	G. Furness (Con)	J. Richardson (Lab)	D. White (Lab)
1976	G. Furness (Con)	B. Jenkins (Con)	D. White (Lab)
1978	G. Furness (Con)	B. Jenkins (Con)	D. White (Lab)
1979	M. Drayton (Lab)	B. Jenkins (Con)	D. White (Lab)
1980	M. Drayton (Lab)	E. Moorhouse (Lab)	D. White (Lab)
1982	E. Moorhouse (Lab)	M. Drayton (Lab)	Barrie Metcalfe (Lab)
1983	G. Colledge (SDP–Lib)	M. Drayton (Lab)	Barrie Metcalfe (Lab)
1984	G. Colledge (SDP–Lib)	M. Drayton (Lab)	Barrie Metcalfe (Lab)
1986	G. Colledge (SDP–Lib)	M. Drayton (Lab)	D. Stokes (SDP–Lib)
1987	Jamil Akhtar (Lab)	M. Drayton (Lab)	D. Stokes (SDP–Lib)
1988	Jamil Akhtar (Lab)	M. Drayton (Lab)	D. Stokes (SLD)
1990	Jamil Akhtar (Lab)	M. Drayton (Lab)	Barrie Metcalfe (Lab)
1991	Jamil Akhtar (Lab)	M. Drayton (Lab)	Barrie Metcalfe (Lab)
1992	Jamil Akhtar (Lab)	E. Lawson (Lab)	Barrie Metcalfe (Lab)
1994	Jamil Akhtar (Lab)	E. Lawson (Lab)	Barrie Metcalfe (Lab)
1995	Jamil Akhtar (Lab)	E. Lawson (Lab)	Barrie Metcalfe (Lab)
1996	Jamil Akhtar (Lab)	Nick Harvey (Green)	Barrie Metcalfe (Lab)
1998	Jamil Akhtar (Lab)	Nick Harvey (Green)	Graham Simpson (Green)
1999	Andrew Cooper (Green)	Nick Harvey (Green)	Graham Simpson (Green)
2000	Andrew Cooper (Green)	Nick Harvey (Green)	Graham Simpson (Green)
2002	Andrew Cooper (Green)	Julie Stewart (Green)	Graham Simpson (Green)
2003	Andrew Cooper (Green)	Julie Stewart (Green)	Graham Simpson (Green)
2004	Sharon Fallows (Green)	Julie Stewart-Turner (Note: née Stewart) (Green)	Andrew Cooper (Green)
2006	Graham Simpson (Green)	Julie Stewart-Turner (Green)	Andrew Cooper (Green)
2007	Graham Simpson (Green)	Julie Stewart-Turner (Green)	Andrew Cooper (Green)
2008	Graham Simpson (Green)	Julie Stewart-Turner (Green)	Andrew Cooper (Green)
2010	Graham Simpson (Green)	Julie Stewart-Turner (Green)	Andrew Cooper (Green)
2011	Graham Simpson (Green)	Julie Stewart-Turner (Green)	Andrew Cooper (Green)
2012	Graham Simpson (Green)	Julie Stewart-Turner (Green)	Andrew Cooper (Green)
2014	Karen Allison (Green)	Julie Stewart-Turner (Green)	Andrew Cooper (Green)
2015	Karen Allison (Green)	Julie Stewart-Turner (Green)	Andrew Cooper (Green)
2016	Karen Allison (Green)	Julie Stewart-Turner (Green)	Andrew Cooper (Green)
2018	Karen Allison (Green)	Julie Stewart-Turner (Green)	Andrew Cooper (Green)
2019	Karen Allison (Green)	Sue Lee-Richards (Green)	Andrew Cooper (Green)
2021	Karen Allison (Green)	Sue Lee-Richards (Green)	Andrew Cooper (Green)
2022	Karen Allison (Green)	Sue Lee-Richards (Green)	Andrew Cooper (Green)
2023	Karen Allison (Green)	Sue Lee-Richards (Green)	Andrew Cooper (Green)
2024	Karen Allison (Green)	Sue Lee-Richards (Green)	Andrew Cooper (Green)

indicates seat up for re-election.

indicates seat up for re-election after boundary changes.

indicates seat up for re-election after casual vacancy.

== Election Results (2004 to present) ==
=== Elections in the 2020s ===
==== May 2024 ====
Kirklees Metropolitan Borough Council election, 2 May 2024: Newsome
Party	Candidate	Votes	%	±%
Green	Andrew Cooper	2,593	66.8	+2.5
Labour	Mark Morris	892	23.0	−1.5
Conservative	Kath Bellamy	272	7.0	−0.6
Liberal Democrats	Waheed Anwar	125	3.2	+1.3
Green hold		Swing		

==== May 2023 ====
Kirklees Metropolitan Borough Council election, 4 May 2023: Newsome
Party	Candidate	Votes	%	±%
Green	Sue Lee-Richards	2,197	64.3	+1.5
Labour	Jane Rylah	837	24.5	−3.4
Conservative	Charles Ayugbo	258	7.6	+0.8
Liberal Democrats	Patrycja Bartosinka	64	1.9	−0.5
Yorkshire	Bikatshi Katenga	61	1.8	+0.1
Green hold		Swing		

==== May 2022 ====
Kirklees Metropolitan Borough Council election, 5 May 2022: Newsome
Party	Candidate	Votes	%	±%
Green	Karen Allison	2,360	60.6	−0.4
Labour	Mohammed Safdar	984	25.3	−0.6
Conservative	John Roberts	379	9.7	−1.8
Liberal Democrats	Andrew Wilkinson	106	2.7	+1.1
Yorkshire	Bikatshi Katenga	68	1.7	N/A
Green hold		Swing		

==== May 2021 ====
Kirklees Metropolitan Borough Council election, 6 May 2021: Newsome
Party	Candidate	Votes	%	±%
Green	Andrew Cooper	2,592	60.97	−2.0
Labour	Pauline Wheat-Bowen	1,102	25.92	−2.0
Conservative	Maria Ackroyd	499	11.48	+5.5
Liberal Democrats	Andrew Wilkinson	69	1.62	−1
Green hold		Swing		

=== Elections in the 2010s ===
==== May 2019 ====
Kirklees Metropolitan Borough Council election, 2 May 2019: Newsome
Party	Candidate	Votes	%	±%
Green	Sue Lee-Richards	2,455	62.8	
Labour	Chris Owen	1,092	27.9	
Conservative	Scarlett Black	266	6.8	
Liberal Democrats	Andrew Wilkinson	95	2.4	
Green hold		Swing		

==== May 2018 ====
Kirklees Metropolitan Borough Council election, 3 May 2018: Newsome
Party	Candidate	Votes	%	±%
Green	Karen Allison	2,215	51.5	▼0.4
Labour	Jo Lawson	1,593	37.0	▼2.0
Conservative	Charlie Reid	366	8.5	▲1.8
Liberal Democrats	Andrew Wilkinson	75	1.7	▼0.7
Yorkshire	Bikatshi Katenga	56	1.3	New
Majority		622	14.5	▲1.6
Registered electors		12,317		
Turnout		4,313	35.0	▼3.6
Rejected ballots		8	0.2	▼0.6
Green hold		Swing	▲0.8	

==== May 2016 ====
Kirklees Metropolitan Borough Council election, 4 May 2016: Newsome
Party	Candidate	Votes	%	±%
Green	Andrew Cooper	2,428	51.9	▲14.2
Labour	Nadeem Iqbal	1,822	39.0	▲5.3
Conservative	Pauline McGleenan	312	6.7	▼6.1
Liberal Democrats	Stephen Bird	113	2.4	▼0.4
Majority		606	12.9	▲8.9
Registered electors		12,193		
Turnout		4,711	38.6	
Rejected ballots		36	0.8	
Green hold		Swing	▲4.5	

==== May 2015 ====
Kirklees Metropolitan Borough Council election, 7 May 2015: Newsome
Party	Candidate	Votes	%	±%
Green	Julie Stewart-Turner	2,842	37.7	▼6.2
Labour	Nadeem Iqbal	2,537	33.7	▲4.3
Conservative	Tasmin Coloney	965	12.8	▲4.7
UKIP	Ian French	889	11.8	▼3.0
Liberal Democrats	Eleanor Ritchie	213	2.8	▲0.1
TUSC	Paul Randall	85	1.1	Steady
Majority		305	4.0	▼10.5
Registered electors		12,801		
Green hold		Swing	▼5.3	

==== May 2014 ====
Kirklees Metropolitan Borough Council election, 22 May 2014: Newsome
Party	Candidate	Votes	%	±%
Green	Karen Allison	1,793	43.9	▼9.1
Labour	Sheikh Ullah	1,201	29.4	▼5.5
UKIP	Ian French	603	14.8	New
Conservative	Simon Ackroyd	332	8.1	▲0.4
Liberal Democrats	Eleanor Ritchie	111	2.7	▲1.0
TUSC	Jake Lawley	47	1.1	▼1.6
Majority		592	14.5	▼3.6
Green hold		Swing	▼1.8	

==== May 2012 ====
Kirklees Metropolitan Borough Council election, 3 May 2012: Newsome
Party	Candidate	Votes	%	±%
Green	Andrew Cooper	2,354	53.0	▲1.4
Labour	Sadia Rehman	1,552	34.9	▲5.7
Conservative	Mark Dodsworth	344	7.7	▼3.6
TUSC	Ian Slattery	119	2.7	▼0.5
Liberal Democrats	Rilwan Olateju	76	1.7	▼3.0
Majority		802	18.1	▼4.3
Registered electors		14,199		
Turnout			31.3	▼3.3
Green hold		Swing	▼2.2	

==== May 2011 ====
Kirklees Metropolitan Borough Council election, 5 May 2011: Newsome
Party	Candidate	Votes	%	±%
Green	Julie Stewart-Turner	2,450	51.6	▲18.8
Labour	Mohammed Saeed	1,383	29.2	▲4.1
Conservative	Jas Virdee	536	11.3	▼4.5
Liberal Democrats	Philip Scott	255	4.7	▼14.3
TUSC	Ian Slattery	150	3.2	New
Majority		1,067	22.4	▲14.7
Registered electors		13,955		
Turnout			34.6	▼18.7
Green hold		Swing	▲7.4	

==== May 2010 ====
Kirklees Metropolitan Borough Council election, 6 May 2010: Newsome
Party	Candidate	Votes	%	±%
Green	Graham Simpson	2,447	32.8	▼14.1
Labour	Munir Ahmed	1,878	25.1	▲3.0
Liberal Democrats	Philip Scott	1,421	19.0	▲12.8
Conservative	Bernard McGuin	1,178	15.8	▲0.2
BNP	Stuart Exley	435	5.8	▼3.5
Independent	Hazel Spencer	109	1.5	New
Majority		569	7.7	▼17.1
Registered electors		14,010		
Turnout			53.3	▲20.7
Green hold		Swing	▼8.6	

=== Elections in the 2000s ===
==== May 2008 ====
Kirklees Metropolitan Borough Council election, 1 May 2008: Newsome
Party	Candidate	Votes	%	±%
Green	Andrew Cooper	1,942	46.9	▼5.8
Labour	Jean Goodison	916	22.1	▼4.1
Conservative	Janice Thomas	645	15.6	▲1.9
BNP	Stuart Exley	384	9.3	New
Liberal Democrats	Helen Greaves	256	6.2	▼1.3
Majority		1,026	24.8	▼1.7
Registered electors		12,866		
Turnout			32.6	▲1.7
Green hold		Swing	▼0.9	

==== May 2007 ====
Kirklees Metropolitan Borough Council election, 3 May 2007: Newsome
Party	Candidate	Votes	%	±%
Green	Julie Stewart-Turner	2,083	52.7	▲10.8
Labour	Jamil Akhtar	1,035	26.2	▼0.1
Conservative	Neil Drake	541	13.7	▲3.0
Liberal Democrats	David Wainwright	296	7.5	▼2.2
Majority		1,048	26.5	▲10.9
Registered electors		12,904		
Turnout			30.9	▼3.5
Green hold		Swing	▲5.5	

==== May 2006 ====
Kirklees Metropolitan Borough Council election, 4 May 2006: Newsome
Party	Candidate	Votes	%	±%
Green	Graham Simpson	1,817	41.9	▲5.0
Labour	Mohammad Iqbal	1,140	26.3	▲6.8
BNP	Simon Towers	491	11.3	▼1.7
Conservative	Neil Drake	464	10.7	▲0.6
Liberal Democrats	Kuldip Brar	420	9.7	▼6.3
Majority		677	15.6	▼1.8
Registered electors		12,224		
Turnout			34.4	▼9.1
Green hold		Swing	▼0.9	

==== June 2004 ====
Kirklees Metropolitan Borough Council election, 10 June 2004: Newsome
Party	Candidate	Votes	%	±%
Green	Andrew Cooper (Note: Elected to serve a 4-year term.)	2,006	36.9	N/A
Green	Julie Stewart-Turner (Note: Elected to serve a 3-year term.)	1,965	–	–
Green	Sharon Fallows (Note: Elected to serve a 2-year term.)	1,882	–	–
Labour	Jamil Akhtar	1,062	19.5	N/A
Labour	Garth Pratt	950	–	–
Liberal Democrats	Kuldip Brar	868	16.0	N/A
Labour	Elsie Wheatley	829	–	–
Liberal Democrats	Anne Thornton	772	–	–
BNP	Allan Milton	709	13.0	N/A
Liberal Democrats	David Crossley	673	–	–
Conservative	Neil Drake	548	10.1	N/A
Conservative	Stephen Halstead	460	–	–
Conservative	Anne Henderson	420	–	–
Socialist Alternative	Jean Goodison	245	4.5	N/A
Socialist Alternative	Dylan Murphy	101	–	–
Socialist Alternative	Michael Forster	100	–	–
Majority		944	17.4	N/A
Registered electors		11,815		
Turnout			43.5	N/A
Green win (new seat)				
Green win (new seat)				
Green win (new seat)				

== Election Results (1982 to 2003) ==
Newsome within Kirklees, 1982 to 2004

=== Elections in the 2000s ===
==== May 2003 ====
Kirklees Metropolitan Borough Council election, 1 May 2003: Newsome
Party	Candidate	Votes	%	±%
Green	Andrew Cooper	1,984	61.1	▲6.7
Labour	Garth Pratt	651	20.0	▼3.4
Liberal Democrats	Anne Thornton	290	8.9	▼2.0
Socialist Alternative	Jean Goodison	165	5.1	▲2.2
Conservative	Anah Mahenn	159	4.9	▼3.5
Majority		1,333	41.1	▲10.1
Registered electors		10,199		
Turnout			31.9	▼1.4
Green hold		Swing	▲5.1	

==== May 2002 ====
Kirklees Metropolitan Borough Council election, 2 May 2002: Newsome
Party	Candidate	Votes	%	±%
Green	Graham Simpson	2,000	54.4	▼4.6
Green	Julie Stewart	1,812	–	–
Labour	Garth Pratt	861	23.4	▲1.9
Labour	Gilbert Hanson	744	–	–
Liberal Democrats	Andrew Hirst	401	10.9	▼1.4
Liberal Democrats	Anne Thornton	351	–	–
Conservative	Michael Brooke	310	8.4	▲3.1
Conservative	Paul Ambler	197	–	–
Socialist Alternative	Dylan Murphy	107	2.9	New
Majority		1,139	31.0	▼6.5
Registered electors		10,708		
Turnout			33.3	▼3.1
Green hold		Swing	▼3.3	
Green hold		Swing	–	

==== May 2000 ====
Kirklees Metropolitan Borough Council election, 4 May 2000: Newsome
Party	Candidate	Votes	%	±%
Green	Nicholas Harvey	2,400	59.0	▲7.3
Labour	Barrie Metcalfe	875	21.5	▼16.8
Liberal Democrats	Rana Younas	500	12.3	▲8.1
Conservative	Oliver Colling	216	5.3	▼0.5
Kirklees Council Watch	Sean Hellawell	77	1.9	New
Majority		1,525	37.5	▲24.1
Registered electors		11,290		
Turnout			36.4	▼3.8
Green hold		Swing	▲12.1	

=== Elections in the 1990s ===
==== May 1999 ====
Kirklees Metropolitan Borough Council election, 6 May 1999: Newsome
Party	Candidate	Votes	%	±%
Green	Andrew Cooper	2,360	52.2	▼4.6
Labour	Jamil Akhtar	1,749	38.7	▲5.0
Conservative	Oliver Colling	264	5.0	▼1.2
Liberal Democrats	D. Waddington	190	4.2	▲0.9
Majority		611	13.5	▼9.6
Registered electors		11,255		
Turnout			40.2	▲2.3
Green gain from Labour		Swing	▼4.8	

==== May 1998 ====
Kirklees Metropolitan Borough Council election, 7 May 1998: Newsome
Party	Candidate	Votes	%	±%
Green	Graham Simpson	2,424	56.8	▼7.9
Labour	Barrie Metcalfe	1,440	33.7	▲3.8
Conservative	K. Giles	264	6.2	New
Liberal Democrats	D. Waddington	141	3.3	▼2.1
Majority		984	23.1	▼11.7
Registered electors		11,356		
Turnout			37.9	▼7.8
Green gain from Labour		Swing	▼5.9	

==== May 1996 ====
Kirklees Metropolitan Borough Council election, 2 May 1996: Newsome
Party	Candidate	Votes	%	±%
Green	Nicholas Harvey	3,300	64.7	▲24.2
Labour	E. Lawson	1,525	29.9	▼14.4
Liberal Democrats	P. Akhtar	278	5.4	▼1.9
Majority		1,775	34.8	N/A
Registered electors		11,269		
Turnout			45.7	▲1.9
Green gain from Labour		Swing	▲19.3	

==== May 1995 ====
Kirklees Metropolitan Borough Council election, 4 May 1995: Newsome
Party	Candidate	Votes	%	±%
Labour	Jamil Akhtar	2,176	44.3	▼6.3
Green	Nicholas Harvey	1,993	40.5	▲21.4
Conservative	A. Brice	389	7.9	▼6.7
Liberal Democrats	B. Burgess	359	7.3	▼8.4
Majority		183	3.8	▼27.7
Registered electors		11,233		
Turnout			43.8	▼0.7
Labour hold		Swing	▼13.9	

==== May 1994 ====
Kirklees Metropolitan Borough Council election, 5 May 1994: Newsome
Party	Candidate	Votes	%	±%
Labour	Barrie Metcalfe	2,549	50.6	▼1.3
Green	Nicholas Harvey	961	19.1	▲13.1
Liberal Democrats	P. Oyston	789	15.7	New
Conservative	J. Broadbent	735	14.6	▼27.5
Majority		1,588	31.5	▲21.7
Registered electors		11,312		
Turnout			44.5	▲9.5
Labour hold		Swing	▲10.9	

==== May 1992 ====
Kirklees Metropolitan Borough Council election, 7 May 1992: Newsome
Party	Candidate	Votes	%	±%
Labour	E. Lawson	2,077	51.9	▲3.0
Conservative	R. Kaye	1,687	42.1	▲13.4
Green	I. McCourtie	240	6.0	▼0.3
Majority		390	9.8	▼10.4
Registered electors		11,480		
Turnout			35.0	▼8.3
Labour hold		Swing	▼5.2	

==== May 1991 ====
Kirklees Metropolitan Borough Council election, 2 May 1991: Newsome
Party	Candidate	Votes	%	±%
Labour	Jamil Akhtar	2,433	48.9	▼8.0
Conservative	B. Sutcliffe	1,429	28.7	▲11.0
Liberal Democrats	M. Homfray	800	16.1	▼1.8
Green	H. Bewsher	314	6.3	▼1.2
Majority		1,004	20.2	▼18.8
Registered electors		11,487		
Turnout			43.3	▼6.9
Labour hold		Swing	▼9.4	

==== May 1990 ====
Kirklees Metropolitan Borough Council election, 3 May 1990: Newsome
Party	Candidate	Votes	%	±%
Labour	Barrie Metcalfe	3,143	56.9	▲2.3
SLD	D. Stokes	991	17.9	New
Conservative	V. Tucker	976	17.7	▼12.9
Green	K. Harvey	412	7.5	▼7.3
Majority		2,152	39.0	▲15.0
Registered electors		11,011		
Turnout			50.2	▲7.5
Labour gain from SLD		Swing	▲7.5	

=== Elections in the 1980s ===
==== May 1988 ====
Kirklees Metropolitan Borough Council election, 5 May 1988: Newsome
Party	Candidate	Votes	%	±%
Labour	M. Drayton	2,643	54.6	▲15.7
Conservative	B. Sutcliffe	1,479	30.6	▲0.1
Green	Nicholas Harvey	715	14.8	▲9.3
Majority		1,164	24.0	▲15.6
Registered electors		11,338		
Turnout			42.7	▼7.8
Labour hold		Swing	▲7.8	

==== May 1987 ====
Kirklees Metropolitan Borough Council election, 7 May 1987: Newsome
Party	Candidate	Votes	%	±%
Labour	Jamil Akhtar	2,212	38.9	▼8.6
Conservative	B. Sutcliffe	1,737	30.5	New
Alliance	M. Chatrik	1,427	25.1	▼27.4
Green	Nicholas Harvey	310	5.5	New
Majority		475	8.4	N/A
Registered electors		11,264		
Turnout			50.5	▲3.3
Labour gain from Alliance		Swing	▲6.7	

==== May 1986 ====
Kirklees Metropolitan Borough Council election, 8 May 1986: Newsome
Party	Candidate	Votes	%	±%
Alliance	D. Stokes	2,789	52.5	▲16.0
Labour	Barrie Metcalfe	2,527	47.5	▲1.0
Majority		262	5.0	N/A
Registered electors		11,263		
Turnout			47.2	▲3.2
Alliance gain from Labour		Swing	▲7.5	

==== May 1984 ====
Kirklees Metropolitan Borough Council election, 3 May 1984: Newsome
Party	Candidate	Votes	%	±%
Labour	M. Drayton	2,316	46.5	▲8.3
Alliance	P. Baker	1,818	36.5	▼2.2
Conservative	A. Haigh	852	17.1	▼6.0
Majority		498	10.0	N/A
Registered electors		11,332		
Turnout			44.0	▲0.1
Labour hold		Swing	▲5.3	

==== May 1983 ====
Kirklees Metropolitan Borough Council election, 5 May 1983: Newsome
Party	Candidate	Votes	%	±%
Alliance	G. Colledge	1,916	38.6	▲9.3
Labour	Jamil Akhtar	1,889	38.1	▼7.1
Conservative	F. Midgley	1,144	23.3	▼2.2
Majority		27	0.5	N/A
Registered electors		11,298		
Turnout			43.9	▲3.0
Alliance gain from Labour		Swing	▲8.2	

==== May 1982 ====
Kirklees Metropolitan Borough Council election, 6 May 1982: Newsome
Party	Candidate	Votes	%	±%
Labour	Barrie Metcalfe	2,011	45.2	N/A
Labour	M. Drayton	1,976	–	–
Labour	E. Moorhouse	1,885	–	–
Alliance	D. Marshall	1,302	29.3	N/A
Alliance	G. Colledge	1,271	–	–
Conservative	M. Calkin	1,133	25.5	N/A
Conservative	H. Lynes	1,090	–	–
Alliance	A. Armstrong	947	–	–
Majority		709	15.9	N/A
Registered electors		10,870		
Turnout			40.9	N/A
Labour win (new seat)				
Labour win (new seat)				
Labour win (new seat)				

== Election Results (1973 to 1980) ==
=== Elections in the 1980s ===
==== May 1980 ====
Kirklees Metropolitan Borough Council election, 1 May 1980: Newsome and Central
Party	Candidate	Votes	%	±%
Labour	E. Moorhouse	2,208	56.1	▲7.7
Conservative	B. Jenkins	1,059	26.9	▼3.6
Liberal	B. Burgess	671	17.0	▼4.2
Majority		1,149	29.2	▲11.3
Registered electors		11,251		
Turnout			35.0	▼36.8
Labour gain from Conservative		Swing	▲5.7	

=== Elections in the 1970s ===
==== May 1979 ====
Kirklees Metropolitan Borough Council election, 3 May 1979: Newsome and Central
Party	Candidate	Votes	%	±%
Labour	M. Drayton	3,833	48.4	▲3.1
Conservative	G. Furness	2,415	30.5	▼13.8
Liberal	B. Burgess	1,679	21.2	▲10.8
Majority		1,418	17.9	▲16.9
Registered electors		11,045		
Turnout			71.8	▲35.1
Labour gain from Conservative		Swing	▲8.5	

==== May 1978 ====
Kirklees Metropolitan Borough Council election, 4 May 1978: Newsome and Central
Party	Candidate	Votes	%	±%
Labour	D. White	1,834	45.3	▲7.9
Conservative	R. Heywood	1,794	44.3	▲4.2
Liberal	D. Adams	420	10.4	▼12.1
Majority		40	1.0	N/A
Registered electors		11,030		
Turnout			36.7	▼4.4
Labour hold		Swing	▲1.9	

==== May 1976 ====
Kirklees Metropolitan Borough Council election, 6 May 1976: Newsome and Central
Party	Candidate	Votes	%	±%
Conservative	B. Jenkins	1,791	40.1	▼0.6
Labour	J. Richardson	1,668	37.4	▲5.0
Liberal	J. Crossley	1,003	22.5	▼4.5
Majority		123	2.7	▼5.6
Registered electors		10,894		
Turnout			41.1	▲5.0
Conservative gain from Labour		Swing	▼2.8	

==== May 1975 ====
Kirklees Metropolitan Borough Council election, 1 May 1975: Newsome and Central
Party	Candidate	Votes	%	±%
Conservative	G. Furness	1,642	40.7	▲14.6
Labour	Mennell	1,308	32.4	▼13.4
Liberal	Hasler	1,089	27.0	▼1.1
Majority		334	8.3	N/A
Registered electors		11,175		
Turnout			36.1	▼1.0
Conservative gain from Labour		Swing	▲5.2	

==== April 1973 ====
Kirklees Metropolitan Borough Council election, 10 May 1973: Newsome and Central
Party	Candidate	Votes	%	±%
Labour	D. White	1,903	45.8	N/A
Labour	J. Richardson	1,881	–	–
Labour	Mennell	1,760	–	–
Liberal	Hasler	1,169	28.1	N/A
Conservative	B. Jenkins	1,083	26.1	N/A
Liberal	Scott	1,040	–	–
Conservative	Littlewood	1,007	–	–
Conservative	Parfitt	939	–	–
Liberal	Edinburgh	883	–	–
Majority		734	17.7	N/A
Registered electors		11,191		
Turnout			37.1	N/A
Labour win (new seat)				
Labour win (new seat)				
Labour win (new seat)				

== Notes ==
• italics denote the sitting councillor • bold denotes the winning candidate
