= 2022 Kirklees Metropolitan Borough Council election =

2022 local election in Kirklees

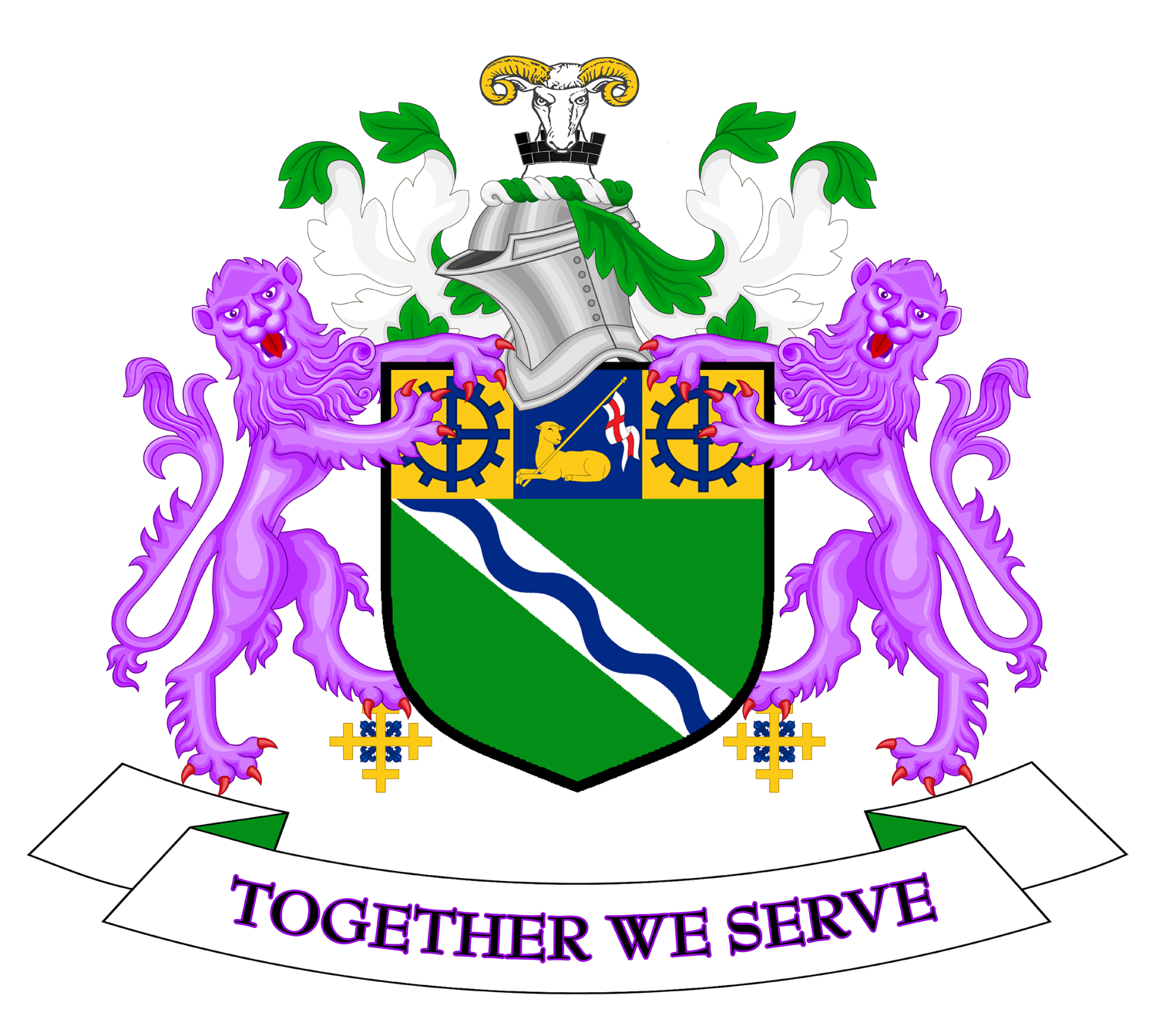
- 5 May 2022

23 of 69 seats on Kirklees Metropolitan Borough Council 35 seats needed for a majority

	First party	Second party	Third party
Leader	Shabir Pandor	David Hall	John Lawson
Party	Labour	Conservative	Liberal Democrats
Leader's seat	Batley West	Liversedge and Gomersal	Cleckheaton
Last election	33 seats, 35.9%	19 seats, 38.0%	9 seats, 10.2%
Seats won	14	5	3
Seats after	36	18	8
Seat change	▲3	▼1	▼1
Popular vote	44,786	34,895	14,409
Percentage	40.9%	31.9%	13.2%
	Fourth party	Fifth party
Leader	Andrew Cooper	Charles Greaves
Party	Green	Independent
Leader's seat	Newsome	Holme Valley North
Last election	3 seats, 10.4%	5 seats, 4.6%
Seats won	1	0
Seats after	3	4
Seat change	Steady	▼1
Popular vote	10,244	1,849
Percentage	9.4%	1.7%
- Map of the results
council control before election
No overall control
Subsequent council control
Labour

The 2022 Kirklees Metropolitan Borough Council election took place on 5 May 2022. One third of councillors—23 out of 69—on Kirklees Metropolitan Borough Council were elected. The election took place alongside other local elections across the United Kingdom.

Following the previous council election in 2021, no party held a majority of seats. Labour held 33, and ran a minority administration. The Conservatives held 19, the Liberal Democrats held 9, the Greens held 3 and independent councillors and councillors for local parties held the remaining five.

== Background ==
Result of the council election when these seats were last contested in 2018

Result of the most recent council election in 2021

The Local Government Act 1972 created a two-tier system of metropolitan counties and districts covering Greater Manchester, Merseyside, South Yorkshire, Tyne and Wear, the West Midlands, and West Yorkshire starting in 1974. Kirklees was a district of the West Yorkshire metropolitan county. The Local Government Act 1985 abolished the metropolitan counties, with metropolitan districts taking on most of their powers as metropolitan boroughs. The West Yorkshire Combined Authority was established in 2014 and began electing the mayor of West Yorkshire in 2021.

Kirklees Council has generally been under no overall control or Labour control since its creation, with the Conservatives controlling the council between 1976 and 1979. The council was under no overall control from 1999 until the 2018 election, when Labour gained two seats to achieve an overall majority on the council. Labour's majority narrowed, with the party holding 35 seats following the 2019 election. Three Labour councillors resigned from their party in November 2020, citing national issues and linked by media to the suspension of the former Labour leader Jeremy Corbyn. In the most recent council election in 2021, the council remained in no overall control with Labour winning 12 seats on 35.9% of the vote, the Conservatives winning 9 seats on 38.0% of the vote, the Liberal Democrats winning 2 seats on 10.2% of the vote, the Green Party winning one seat on 10.4% of the vote and the Heavy Woollen District Independents winning one seat with 0.4% of the vote.

Positions up for election in 2022 were last elected in 2018. In that election, 12 Labour councillors were elected, as were seven Conservatives, three Liberal Democrats, one Green and one independent.

== Campaign ==
The Local Democracy Reporting Service reported that Almondbury, Colne Valley, Dalton, Denby Dale, Dewsbury East, Golcar, Heckmondwike, Holme Valley North, and Lindley wards were "battlegrounds", and that the Liberal Democrats and Green Party were unlikely to support Labour if they needed to work with other parties having lost seats.

== Electoral process ==
The council elects its councillors in thirds, with a third being up for election every year for three years, with no election in the fourth year. The election will take place by first-past-the-post voting, with wards generally being represented by three councillors, with one elected in each election year to serve a four-year term.

All registered electors (British, Irish, Commonwealth and European Union citizens) living in Kirklees aged 18 or over will be entitled to vote in the election. People who live at two addresses in different councils, such as university students with different term-time and holiday addresses, are entitled to be registered for and vote in elections in both local authorities. Voting in-person at polling stations will take place from 07:00 to 22:00 on election day, and voters will be able to apply for postal votes or proxy votes in advance of the election.

== Council composition ==
After 2021 election		Before 2022 election		After 2022 election	
Party	Seats	Party	Seats	Party	
Labour	33	Labour	33	Labour	36
Conservative	19	Conservative	19	Conservative	18
Liberal Democrats	9	Liberal Democrats	9	Liberal Democrats	8
Independent	5	Independent	5	Independent	4
Green	3	Green	3	Green	3

== Results summary ==
2022 Kirklees Metropolitan Borough Council election
Party	This election				Full council			This election		
Party	Candidates	Seats	Net	Seats %	Other	Total	Total %	Votes	Votes %	+/−
Labour	23	14	▲3	60.9	22	36	52.2	44,786	40.9	+5.0
Conservative	23	5	▼1	21.7	13	18	26.1	34,895	31.9	-6.1
Liberal Democrats	23	3	▼1	13.1	5	8	11.6	14,409	13.2	+3.0
Independent	2	0	▼1	0.0	4	4	5.8	1,849	1.7	-2.3
Green	21	1	Steady	4.3	2	3	4.3	10,244	9.4	-1.0
Workers Party	2	0	Steady	0.0	0	0	0.0	2,563	2.3	N/A
Monster Raving Loony	1	0	Steady	0.0	0	0	0.0	236	0.2	N/A
Freedom Alliance	2	0	Steady	0.0	0	0	0.0	170	0.2	-0.1
UKIP	1	0	Steady	0.0	0	0	0.0	106	0.1	N/A
Yorkshire	1	0	Steady	0.0	0	0	0.0	68	0.1	-0.3
Reform	1	0	Steady	0.0	0	0	0.0	63	0.1	±0.0

== Ward results ==
=== Almondbury ===
Almondbury
Party	Candidate	Votes	%	±%
Liberal Democrats	Alison Munro	2,238	48	+8
Conservative	Maria Ackroyd	1,275	27	+4
Labour	Barbara Jones	840	18	−12
Green	Peter Taylor	286	6	+2
Majority		963	21	
Turnout		4,639	34.5	
Liberal Democrats hold		Swing		

=== Ashbrow ===
Ashbrow
Party	Candidate	Votes	%	±%
Labour	Fran Perry	2,315	57	+7
Conservative	Dafydd Daniel	1,109	27	−8
Green	Brenda Smithson	447	11	+1
Liberal Democrats	Manjit Singh	213	5	0
Majority		1,206	30	
Turnout		4,084	29.0	
Labour hold		Swing		

=== Batley East ===
Batley East
Party	Candidate	Votes	%	±%
Labour	Adam Zaman	2,170	45	−23
Workers Party	Abdul Daji	1,611	33	N/A
Conservative	Keiron Gavaghan	734	15	−7
Green	Simon Duffy	201	4	−2
Liberal Democrats	David Shepherd	152	3	0
Majority		559	12	
Turnout		4,868	37	
Labour hold		Swing		

=== Batley West ===
Batley West
Party	Candidate	Votes	%	±%
Labour	Gwen Lowe	2,713	64	+7
Conservative	Mohammed Laher	1,087	25	−4
Liberal Democrats	Stephen Long	233	5	+2
Green	Jack Senior	233	5	−1
Majority		1,626	39	
Turnout		4,266	30.8	
Labour hold		Swing		

=== Birstall & Birkenshaw ===
Birstall & Birkenshaw
Party	Candidate	Votes	%	±%
Conservative	Liz Smaje	2,104	53	+2
Labour	Julie Smith	1,370	35	+12
Liberal Democrats	Louise Walsh	254	6	+1
Green	Tahir Akram	240	6	−3
Majority		734	18	
Turnout		3,968	30.7	
Conservative hold		Swing		

=== Cleckheaton ===
Cleckheaton
Party	Candidate	Votes	%	±%
Liberal Democrats	John Lawson	2,650	61.1	+12.4
Conservative	Piers Briggs	1,085	25.0	−9.7
Labour	Khalid Patel	600	13.8	+2.0
Majority		1,565	36.1	
Turnout		4,335	32.0	
Liberal Democrats hold		Swing	▲11.1	

=== Colne Valley ===
Colne Valley
Party	Candidate	Votes	%	±%
Labour Co-op	Harry McCarthy	2,509	45.5	+8.3
Conservative	Donna Bellamy	1,988	36.0	+3.3
Liberal Democrats	Jake Marchington	542	9.8	−13.6
Green	Julia Norman	375	6.8	±0.0
UKIP	Melanie Roberts	106	1.9	N/A
Majority		521	9.5	
Turnout		5,520	40.4	
Labour Co-op hold		Swing	▲2.5	

=== Crosland Moor & Netherton ===
Crosland Moor & Netherton
Party	Candidate	Votes	%	±%
Labour	Jo Lawson	2,460	56.2	+5.5
Conservative	Isaac Barnett	1,035	23.7	−6.2
Liberal Democrats	Suzanne Barraclough	358	8.2	+1.6
Green	Chris Green	341	7.8	−0.6
Independent	Steve Bradbury	182	4.2	+1.2
Majority		1,425	32.5	
Turnout		4,376	32.9	
Labour hold		Swing	▲5.9	

=== Dalton ===
Dalton
Party	Candidate	Votes	%	±%
Labour Co-op	Tyler Hawkins	1,941	51.8	+11.6
Conservative	Jason Easingwood	1,180	31.5	−4.7
Green	Clare Walters	357	9.5	−4.3
Liberal Democrats	Dominic Black	270	7.2	−2.6
Majority		761	20.3	
Turnout		3,748	29.9	
Labour hold		Swing	▲8.2	

=== Denby Dale ===
Denby Dale
Party	Candidate	Votes	%	±%
Labour	Will Simpson	2,879	49.8	+10.0
Conservative	Vicky Rank	2,283	39.5	−8.4
Liberal Democrats	Craig Armistead	264	4.6	+1.0
Green	Michael Shaw	259	4.5	−2.9
Freedom Alliance	Jonathan Tilt	96	1.7	N/A
Majority		596	10.3	
Turnout		5,781	43.3	
Labour gain from Conservative		Swing	▲9.2	

=== Dewsbury East ===
Dewsbury East
Party	Candidate	Votes	%	±%
Labour	Cathy Scott	1,934	48.9	+5.7
Conservative	Keith Mallinson	1,307	33.1	+2.6
Liberal Democrats	Dan Woodlock	311	7.9	+4.5
Monster Raving Loony	Sir Archibald Earl 'Eaton	236	6.0	N/A
Green	Gideon Richards	164	4.1	+0.6
Majority		627	15.8	
Turnout		3,952	28.1	
Labour hold		Swing	▲1.6	

=== Dewsbury South ===
Dewsbury South
Party	Candidate	Votes	%	±%
Labour	Masood Ahmed	3,069	70.7	+27.5
Conservative	Sean Guy	907	20.9	−9.6
Green	Albert Parker	217	5.0	+1.5
Liberal Democrats	Dennis Hullock	147	3.4	±0.0
Majority		2,162	49.8	
Turnout		4,340	32.3	
Labour hold		Swing	▲18.6	

=== Dewsbury West ===
Dewsbury West
Party	Candidate	Votes	%	±%
Labour	Ammar Anwar	3,268	64.7	+23.3
Conservative	Sajid Hussain	1,328	26.3	−1.8
Liberal Democrats	John Rossington	229	4.5	+1.6
Green	Nicholas Whittingham	229	4.5	+1.7
Majority		1,940	38.4	
Turnout		5,054	36.4	
Labour hold		Swing	▲12.6	

=== Golcar ===
Golcar
Party	Candidate	Votes	%	±%
Labour	Graham Turner	1,744	38.1	+6.1
Liberal Democrats	Robert Iredale	1,695	37.1	+5.2
Conservative	Trevor Bellamy	751	16.4	−8.1
Green	Nina Roberts	309	6.8	−3.1
Freedom Alliance	Miri Finch	74	1.6	−0.1
Majority		49	1.0	
Turnout		4,573	33.0	
Labour gain from Liberal Democrats		Swing	▲0.5	

=== Greenhead ===
Greenhead
Party	Candidate	Votes	%	±%
Labour	Mohan Sokhal	3,179	66.1	+8.4
Conservative	Eileen Marchant	674	14.0	−6.8
Green	Heather Peacock	639	13.3	−2.7
Liberal Democrats	Peter Harrison	321	6.7	+1.2
Majority		2,505	52.1	
Turnout		4,813	34.7	
Labour hold		Swing	▲7.6	

=== Heckmondwike ===
Heckmondwike
Party	Candidate	Votes	%	±%
Labour	Viv Kendrick	1,985	43.5	−1.7
Conservative	Itrat Ali	1,317	28.9	−13.1
Workers Party	Zahid Kahut	952	20.9	N/A
Liberal Democrats	Josie Pugsley	309	6.8	+2.5
Majority		668	14.6	
Turnout		4,563	34.0	
Labour hold		Swing	▲5.7	

=== Holme Valley North ===
Holme Valley North
Party	Candidate	Votes	%	±%
Conservative	Tony McGrath	1,739	33.1	+0.2
Independent	Terry Lyons	1,667	31.7	−3.1
Labour	Ben Lockley	1,214	23.1	+1.1
Green	Samuel Midgley	364	6.9	+0.9
Liberal Democrats	Kingsley Hill	206	3.9	+0.9
Reform	Susan Laird	63	1.2	N/A
Majority		72	1.4	
Turnout		5,253	39.3	
Conservative gain from Independent		Swing	▲1.7	

=== Holme Valley South ===
Holme Valley South
Party	Candidate	Votes	%	±%
Labour	Moses Crook	3,016	46.8	+11.0
Conservative	Damian Brook	2,710	42.0	−4.9
Green	Darryl Gould	453	7.0	±0.0
Liberal Democrats	Andrew McCaig	266	4.1	−2.3
Majority		306	4.8	
Turnout		6,445	42.2	
Labour gain from Conservative		Swing	▲8.0	

=== Kirkburton ===
Kirkburton
Party	Candidate	Votes	%	±%
Conservative	Bill Armer	2,450	49.6	−4.7
Green	Richard Burton	1,690	34.2	±0.0
Labour	Soyeb Yusuf	670	13.6	+3.3
Liberal Democrats	Waheed Anwar	132	2.7	+1.6
Majority		760	15.4	
Turnout		4,942	39.0	
Conservative hold		Swing	▼2.4	

=== Lindley ===
Lindley
Party	Candidate	Votes	%	±%
Liberal Democrats	Cahal Burke	3,062	49.3	+13.7
Conservative	David Heathcote	2,069	33.3	−6.4
Labour	Gulfam Asif	844	13.6	−5.0
Green	Ian Vincent	233	3.8	−2.4
Majority		993	16.0	
Turnout		6,208	40.2	
Liberal Democrats hold		Swing	▲10.1	

=== Liversedge & Gomersal ===
Liversedge & Gomersal
Party	Candidate	Votes	%	±%
Conservative	David Hall	2,364	56.6	−1.6
Labour	Jude McKaig	1,274	30.5	+5.4
Green	Linda Simmons	300	7.2	+0.5
Liberal Democrats	David Snee	237	5.7	+1.7
Majority		1,090	26.1	
Turnout		4,175	29.9	
Conservative hold		Swing	▼3.5	

=== Mirfield ===
Mirfield
Party	Candidate	Votes	%	±%
Conservative	Vivien Lees-Hamilton	3,020	54.0	−15.1
Labour	Geoff Kernan	1,808	32.3	+12.4
Green	Catherine Whittingham	547	9.8	+1.3
Liberal Democrats	Stephen Bird	214	3.8	+1.2
Majority		1,212	21.7	
Turnout		5,589	35.9	
Conservative hold		Swing	▼13.8	

=== Newsome ===
Newsome
Party	Candidate	Votes	%	±%
Green	Karen Allison	2,360	60.6	−0.4
Labour	Mohammed Safdar	984	25.3	−0.6
Conservative	John Roberts	379	9.7	−1.8
Liberal Democrats	Andrew Wilkinson	106	2.7	+1.1
Yorkshire	Bikatshi Katenga	68	1.7	N/A
Majority		1,376	35.3	
Turnout		3,897	30.8	
Green hold		Swing	▼0.1	
