= 2023 Kirklees Metropolitan Borough Council election =

2023 local election in Kirklees

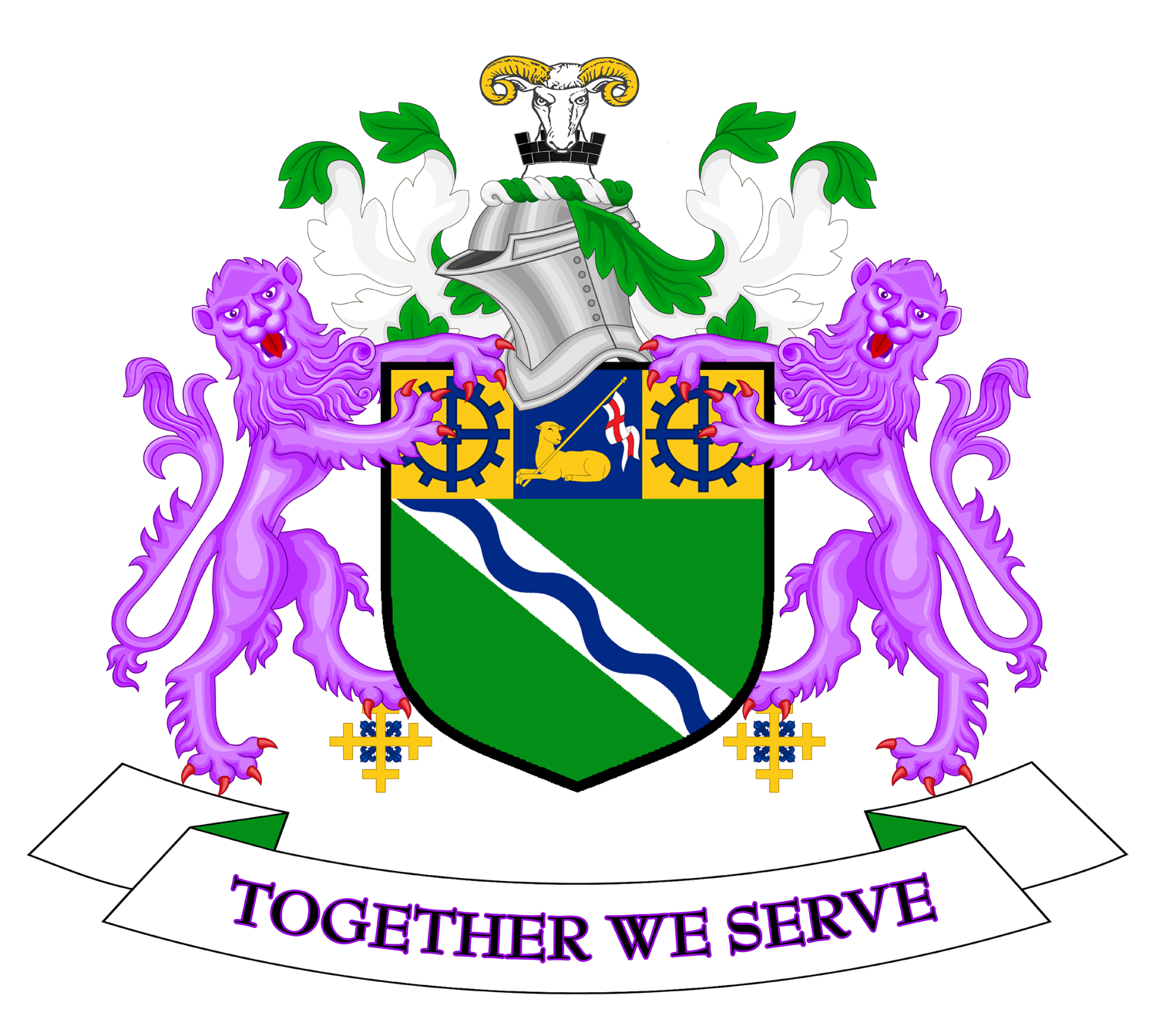
- 4 May 2023

24 of 69 seats on Kirklees Metropolitan Borough Council 35 seats needed for a majority

	First party	Second party	Third party
Leader	Shabir Pandor	David Hall	John Lawson
Party	Labour	Conservative	Liberal Democrats
Leader's seat	Batley West	Liversedge and Gomersal	Cleckheaton
Seats before	35	18	8
	Fourth party	Fifth party
Leader	Andrew Cooper
Party	Green	Independent
Leader's seat	Newsome
Seats before	3	4 (Note: Of the four independent councillors prior to the election, three formed the "Independent Group" led by Charles Greaves, and one was described as an "Independent".)
- The winner of each seat in the 2023 Kirklees Metropolitan Borough Council Elections
Leader before election
Shabir Pandor
Labour
Leader after election
TBD

The 2023 Kirklees Metropolitan Borough Council elections were held on 4 May 2023 alongside other elections across the United Kingdom. 24 out of the 69 seats on Kirklees Council were contested.

The Labour Party retained its majority on the council.

== Background ==
The Local Government Act 1972 created a two-tier system of metropolitan counties and districts covering Greater Manchester, Merseyside, South Yorkshire, Tyne and Wear, the West Midlands, and West Yorkshire starting in 1974. Kirklees was a district of the West Yorkshire metropolitan county. The Local Government Act 1985 abolished the metropolitan counties, with metropolitan districts taking on most of their powers as metropolitan boroughs. The West Yorkshire Combined Authority was established in 2014 and began electing the Mayor of West Yorkshire in 2021.

Kirklees Council has generally been under no overall control or Labour control since its creation, with the Conservatives controlling the council between 1976 and 1979. Labour have been in control (with both majority and minority administrations) since 2018. It is considered one of the most marginal councils in West Yorkshire.

In the most recent council election in 2022 Labour regained overall control of the council, winning 14 seats (gaining two), the Conservatives won 5 seats (losing one), the Liberal Democrats won three seats, the Green Party won one seat and an independent candidate lost their seat.

The seats that are up for election in 2023 were last contested in 2019, along with one additional seat in Ashbrow ward. Of the seats contested, Labour hold 11, the Conservatives hold five, the Liberal Democrats hold four, the Green Party hold one and independent candidates hold three.

== Electoral process ==
The council elects its councillors in thirds, with a third being up for election every year for three years, with no election in the fourth year. Councillors are elected via first-past-the-post voting, with each ward represented by three councillors, with one elected in each election year to serve a four-year term.

All registered electors (British, Irish, Commonwealth and European Union citizens) living in Kirklees aged 18 or over will be entitled to vote in the election. People who live at two addresses in different councils, such as university students with different term-time and holiday addresses, are entitled to be registered for and vote in elections in both local authorities. Voting in-person at polling stations will take place from 07:00 to 22:00 on election day, and voters will be able to apply for postal votes or proxy votes in advance of the election.

As a result of the Elections Act 2022 electors will, for the first time, be asked to provide photographic identification in order to cast their votes at the polling station.

== Previous council composition ==
After 2022 election		Before 2023 election	
Party	Seats	Party	Seats
Labour	36	Labour	35
Conservative	18	Conservative	18
Liberal Democrats	8	Liberal Democrats	8
Independent	4	Independent	4
Green	3	Green	3
		vacant	1

== Results summary ==
2023 Kirklees Metropolitan Borough Council election
Party	This election				Full council			This election		
Party	Candidates	Seats	Net	Seats %	Other	Total	Total %	Votes	Votes %	+/−
Labour	24	14	▲3	58.3	25	39	56.5	43,711	42.6	+1.7
Conservative	24	5	Steady	20.8	13	18	26.1	31,190	30.4	-1.5
Liberal Democrats	24	4	Steady	16.7	4	8	11.6	13,966	13.6	+0.4
Green	24	1	Steady	4.2	2	3	4.3	10,733	10.5	+1.5
Independent	10	0	▼2	0.0	1	1	1.4	2,519	2.5	+0.8
Reform	1	0	Steady	0.0	0	0	0.0	321	0.3	+0.2
Yorkshire	1	0	Steady	0.0	0	0	0.0	61	0.1	±0.0
SDP	1	0	Steady	0.0	0	0	0.0	53	0.1	±0.0

== Ward results ==
=== Almondbury ===
Almondbury
Party	Candidate	Votes	%	±%
Liberal Democrats	Paola Davies	1,906	46.3	+0.8
Conservative	Maria Carthy	1,048	25.5	+2.9
Labour	Patricia Colling	832	20.2	−0.3
Green	Peter Taylor	243	5.9	−5.5
Independent	Josie McCabe	88	2.1	N/A
Majority				
Rejected ballots				
Turnout				
Registered electors				
Liberal Democrats hold		Swing		

=== Ashbrow ===
Ashbrow
Party	Candidate	Votes	%	±%
Labour	Amanda Pinnock	2,092	55.7	+4.9
Labour	Zarina Shahbaz	1,763	47.0	−3.8
Conservative	Ian Carthy	927	24.7	−1.8
Conservative	Ian Roberts	848	22.6	−3.9
Green	Brenda Smmithson	412	11.0	−4.5
Green	Heidi Din	344	9.2	−6.3
Liberal Democrats	Manjit Singh	264	7.0	−0.2
Majority				
Rejected ballots		14		
Turnout		3,768	26.6	
Registered electors				
Labour hold		Swing		
Labour hold		Swing		

=== Batley East ===
Batley East
Party	Candidate	Votes	%	±%
Labour Co-op	Habiban Zaman	1,978	44.3	−26.2
Conservative	Hanif Mayet	1,964	44.0	+26.8
Liberal Democrats	Gill Long	262	5.9	+2.1
Green	Simon Duffy	256	5.7	−2.8
Majority				
Rejected ballots				
Turnout				
Registered electors				
Labour hold		Swing		

=== Batley West ===
Batley West
Party	Candidate	Votes	%	±%
Labour Co-op	Yusra Hussain	2,342	59.4	+11.1
Conservative	Mohammed Laher	953	24.2	+13.3
Liberal Democrats	Stephen Long	391	9.9	+8.1
Green	John Phillips	255	6.5	+4.0
Majority				
Rejected ballots				
Turnout				
Registered electors				
Labour hold		Swing		

=== Birstall & Birkenshaw ===
Birstall & Birkenshaw
Party	Candidate	Votes	%	±%
Conservative	Joshua Sheard	1,839	49.2	−4.6
Labour	Julie Smith	1,363	36.5	+13.7
Liberal Democrats	Louise Walsh	323	8.6	−1.1
Green	Tahir Akram	160	4.3	−9.4
SDP	Mark Steele	53	1.4	N/A
Majority				
Rejected ballots				
Turnout				
Registered electors				
Conservative hold		Swing		

=== Cleckheaton ===
Cleckheaton
Party	Candidate	Votes	%	±%
Liberal Democrats	Andrew Pinnock	2,763	67.8	+3.3
Conservative	Piers Briggs	691	17.1	+2.0
Labour	Khalid Patel	443	11.0	+1.7
Green	Nicholas Whittingham	165	4.1	−7.0
Majority				
Rejected ballots				
Turnout				
Registered electors				
Liberal Democrats hold		Swing		

=== Colne Valley ===
Colne Valley
Party	Candidate	Votes	%	±%
Labour	Beverley Addy	2,543	50.4	+20.6
Conservative	Isaac Barnett	1,336	26.5	+1.4
Liberal Democrats	Jake Marchington	689	13.7	−12.0
Green	Julia Norman	479	9.5	+1.2
Majority				
Rejected ballots				
Turnout				
Registered electors				
Labour hold		Swing		

=== Crosland Moor & Netherton ===
Crosland Moor & Netherton
Party	Candidate	Votes	%	±%
Labour	Imran Safdar	2,237	52.3	+0.8
Green	Alex Vickers	1,049	24.5	+15.1
Conservative	Matthew Crompton	752	17.6	−0.3
Liberal Democrats	Suzanne Barraclough	242	5.7	−1.1
Majority				
Rejected ballots				
Turnout				
Registered electors				
Labour hold		Swing		

=== Dalton ===
Dalton
Party	Candidate	Votes	%	±%
Labour	Mus Khan	1,664	52.4	+13.9
Conservative	Kash Masih	661	20.8	+4.3
Green	Clare Walters	410	12.9	+2.5
Liberal Democrats	Dominic Black	304	9.6	−6.7
Independent	Clare Holden	134	4.2	N/A
Majority				
Rejected ballots				
Turnout				
Registered electors				
Labour hold		Swing		

=== Denby Dale ===
Denby Dale
Party	Candidate	Votes	%	±%
Labour	Hannah McKerchar	2,417	45.5	+13.1
Conservative	Michael Watson	2,164	40.7	−0.8
Green	Michael Shaw	253	4.8	−7.5
Liberal Democrats	Alison Baskeyfield	251	4.7	−9.1
Independent	Jonathan Tilt	226	4.3	N/A
Majority				
Rejected ballots				
Turnout				
Registered electors				
Labour gain from Conservative		Swing		

=== Dewsbury East ===
Dewsbury East
Party	Candidate	Votes	%	±%
Labour	Paul Moore	1,809	55.6	+15.6
Conservative	Hazel Sharp	911	28.0	+16.5
Liberal Democrats	Dan Woodlock	337	10.4	+6.9
Green	Gideon Richards	194	6.0	+2.7
Majority				
Rejected ballots				
Turnout				
Registered electors				
Labour gain from Dewsbury Borough Independents		Swing		

=== Dewsbury South ===
Dewsbury South
Party	Candidate	Votes	%	±%
Labour	Nosheen Dad	2,405	65.7	+1.4
Conservative	Sean Guy	689	18.8	+1.0
Independent	Richard Beck	260	7.1	N/A
Green	Toby Cooper	184	5.0	−5.9
Liberal Democrats	Dennis Hullock	124	3.4	−3.6
Majority				
Rejected ballots				
Turnout				
Registered electors				
Labour hold		Swing		

=== Dewsbury West ===
Dewsbury West
Party	Candidate	Votes	%	±%
Labour	Darren O`Donovan	2,664	56.8	−15.3
Conservative	Sajid Hussain	1,663	35.5	+22.7
Green	Simon Cope	217	4.6	−4.6
Liberal Democrats	John Rossington	145	3.1	−2.7
Majority				
Rejected ballots				
Turnout				
Registered electors				
Labour hold		Swing		

=== Golcar ===
Golcar
Party	Candidate	Votes	%	±%
Liberal Democrats	Andrew Marchington	1,743	41.7	−0.1
Labour	Angela Sewell	1,581	37.8	+9.6
Conservative	Jackie Firth-Walker	511	12.2	+3.2
Green	Nina Roberts	270	6.5	−1.1
Independent	Mark Finch	77	1.8	N/A
Majority				
Rejected ballots				
Turnout				
Registered electors				
Liberal Democrats hold		Swing		

=== Greenhead ===
Greenhead
Party	Candidate	Votes	%	±%
Labour	Carole Pattison	2,882	67.3	+2.3
Conservative	Pauline McGleenan	584	13.6	+3.6
Green	Heather Peacock	548	12.8	+2.8
Liberal Democrats	Andrew McCaig	271	6.3	−1.2
Majority				
Rejected ballots				
Turnout				
Registered electors				
Labour hold		Swing		

=== Heckmondwike ===
Heckmondwike
Party	Candidate	Votes	%	±%
Labour Co-op	Aafaq Butt	2,292	64.3	+16.4
Conservative	Keith Mallinson	900	25.2	+5.2
Liberal Democrats	Josie Pugsley	209	5.9	+1.5
Green	Graham Simpson	164	4.6	−4.8
Majority				
Rejected ballots				
Turnout				
Registered electors				
Labour hold		Swing		

=== Holme Valley North ===
Holme Valley North
Party	Candidate	Votes	%	±%
Conservative	Donna Bellamy	1,730	32.6	+14.5
Labour	Jo Murtagh	1,527	28.8	+8.6
Independent	Richard Noon	1,338	25.2	−11.9
Green	Samuel Midgley	335	6.3	−2.0
Independent	Miri Finch	196	3.7	N/A
Liberal Democrats	Kingsley Hill	153	2.9	−1.6
Independent	Suzanne Gannon	26	0.5	N/A
Majority				
Rejected ballots				
Turnout				
Registered electors				
Conservative gain from Independent		Swing		

=== Holme Valley South ===
Holme Valley South
Party	Candidate	Votes	%	±%
Labour Co-op	Paul Davies	2,785	45.5	+13.6
Conservative	Damian Brook	2,585	42.2	+14.0
Green	Darryl Gould	478	7.8	−2.8
Liberal Democrats	Jon Bloom	276	4.5	−4.9
Majority				
Rejected ballots				
Turnout				
Registered electors				
Labour hold		Swing		

=== Kirkburton ===
Kirkburton
Party	Candidate	Votes	%	±%
Conservative	John Taylor	2,311	50.3	+4.2
Labour	Edward Bowen	1,066	23.2	+7.3
Green	Richard Burton	953	20.7	−13.8
Liberal Democrats	Craig Armistead	172	3.7	+0.3
Independent	Lisa Beck	92	2.0	N/A
Majority				
Rejected ballots				
Turnout				
Registered electors				
Conservative hold		Swing		

=== Lindley ===
Lindley
Party	Candidate	Votes	%	±%
Liberal Democrats	Anthony Smith	2,649	46.4	+14.1
Conservative	Robert McGuin	1,783	31.3	+1.2
Labour	Munir Ahmed	982	16.3	−6.6
Green	Chris Green	258	4.5	−0.6
Independent	Mike Chalker	82	1.4	−0.8
Majority				
Rejected ballots				
Turnout				
Registered electors				
Liberal Democrats hold		Swing		

=== Liversedge & Gomersal ===
Liversedge & Gomersal
Party	Candidate	Votes	%	±%
Conservative	Lisa Holmes	2,030	54.2	−7.4
Labour	Emily Warrillow	1,341	35.8	+13.0
Green	Linda Simmons	214	5.7	−4.1
Liberal Democrats	David Snee	163	4.3	−1.5
Majority				
Rejected ballots				
Turnout				
Registered electors				
Conservative hold		Swing		

=== Mirfield ===
Mirfield
Party	Candidate	Votes	%	±%
Conservative	Itrat Ali	2,052	39.5	−19.2
Labour	Geoff Kernan	1,866	35.9	+18.0
Green	Catherine Whittingham	695	13.4	−4.5
Reform	Samuel Griffith-Jones	321	6.2	N/A
Liberal Democrats	Stephen Bird	265	5.1	−0.4
Majority				
Rejected ballots				
Turnout				
Registered electors				
Conservative hold		Swing		

=== Newsome ===
Newsome
Party	Candidate	Votes	%	±%
Green	Susan Lee-Richards	2,197	64.3	+1.5
Labour	Jane Rylah	837	24.5	−3.4
Conservative	Charles Ayugbo	258	7.6	+0.8
Liberal Democrats	Patrycja Bartosinska	64	1.9	−0.5
Yorkshire	Bikatshi Katenga	61	1.8	N/A
Majority				
Rejected ballots				
Turnout				
Registered electors				
Green hold		Swing		
