= 2018 Kirklees Metropolitan Borough Council election =

2018 UK local government election

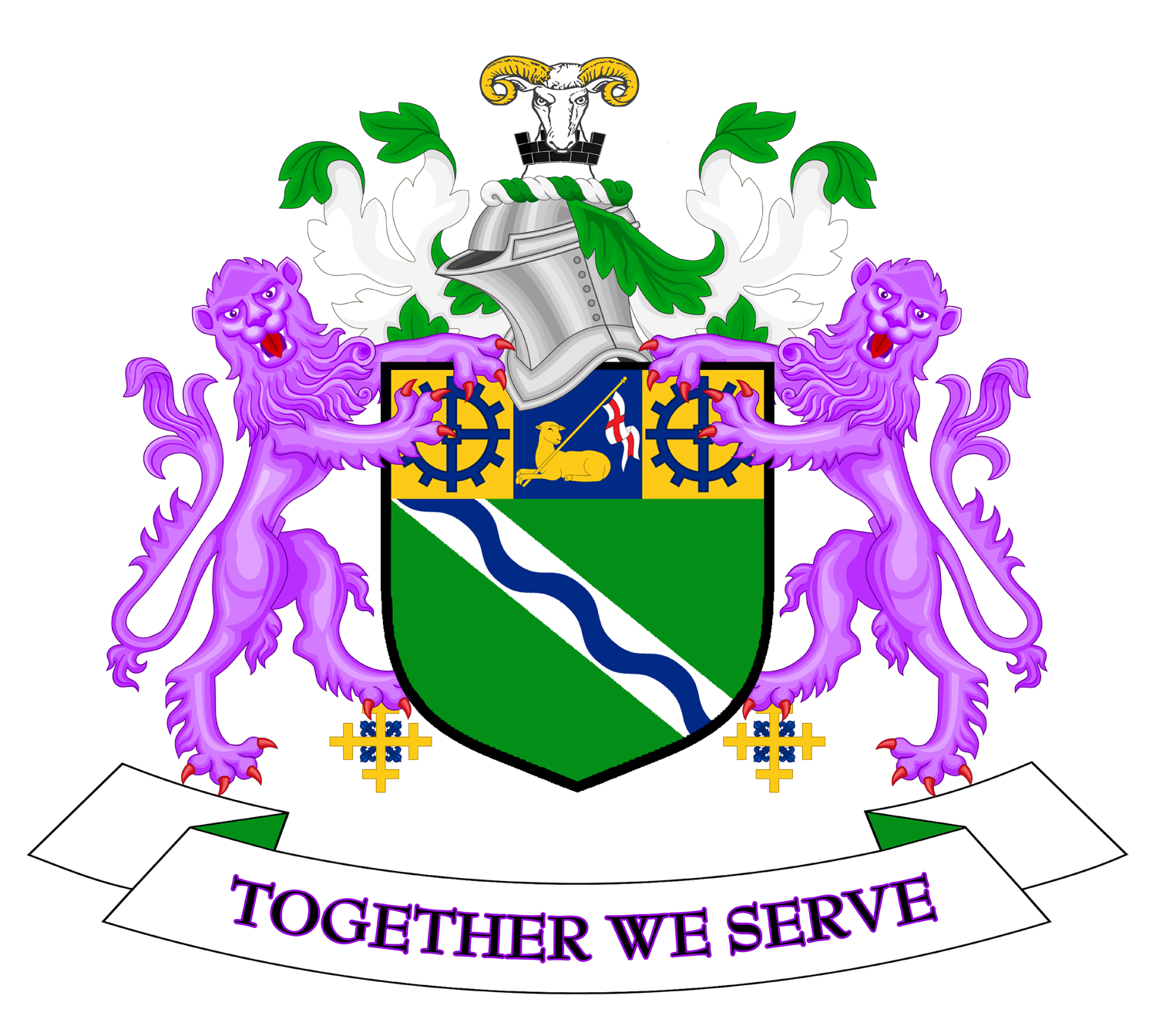
- May 3, 2018

24 of the 69 seats on Kirklees Metropolitan Borough Council 35 seats needed for a majority
- Turnout: 35%

	First party	Second party	Third party
Leader	David Sheard	David Hall	Nicola Turner
Party	Labour	Conservative	Liberal Democrats
Leader's seat	Heckmondwike	Liversedge and Gomersal	Colne Valley
Seats before	33	20	9
Seats after	36	20	7
Seat change	▲3	Steady	▼2
- Map showing the results of the 2018 Kirklees Metropolitan Borough Council election
Council control before election
Labour minority administration
Elected Council control
Labour

The 2018 Kirklees Metropolitan Borough Council election took place on 3 May 2018 to elect members of Kirklees Metropolitan Borough Council in England. This was on the same day as other local elections in England. The result gave the Labour Party majority control of Kirklees Council with 36 of the 69 councillors representing the party.

== Results summary ==
2019 Kirklees Metropolitan Borough Council election
Party	This Election			
Party	Seats	Net	Votes	Votes %
Labour	12	▲3	49,733	40
Conservative	7	Steady	35,847	32
Liberal Democrats	3	▼2	14,116	12
Green	1	Steady	8,441	7
Independent	1	▼1	3,502	2
Dewsbury Borough Independents	Steady	Steady	1,070	<1
TUSC	Steady	Steady	986	<1
UKIP	Steady	Steady	411	<1
Democrats and Veterans	Steady	Steady	317	<1
Pirate Party UK	Steady	Steady	64	<1
Yorkshire Party	Steady	Steady	56	<1

== Ward results ==
=== Almondbury ward ===
Almondbury
Party	Candidate	Votes	%	±%
Liberal Democrats	Alison Munro	2,042	40	+14
Labour	Louise Peace	1641	32	+6
Conservative	Clive Walton	1194	23	−4
Green	Tricia Moores	218	4	−6

=== Ashbrow ward ===
Ashbrow
Party	Candidate	Votes	%	±%
Labour	Harpreet Uppal	2,490	56	−2
Conservative	Maria Ackroyd	1231	28	+2
TUSC	Nicola Jackson	285	6	
Green	Joan Smithson	239	5	−7
Liberal Democrats	Andrew McCaig	196	4	0

=== Batley East ward ===
Batley East
Party	Candidate	Votes	%	±%
Labour	Mahmood Akhtar	3,293	75	+24.30
Conservative	Keiron Gavaghan	811	18	+8.19
Green	Jessica Berry	162	4	−3.19
Liberal Democrats	Jon Bloom	141	3	−1.69

=== Batley West ward ===
Batley West
Party	Candidate	Votes	%	±%
Labour Co-op	Gwen Lowe	3,052	69.0	+3.32
Conservative	Paul Young	1099	24.8	+6.03
Green	Marnie Cope	111	2.5	−5.92
Liberal Democrats	Christopher Kane	99	2.2	−1.22
Pirate	Garry Kitchin	64	1.4	+1.4

=== Birstall and Birkenshaw ward ===
Birstall and Birkenshaw (2)
Party	Candidate	Votes	%	±%
Conservative	Liz Smaje	2,294	31	
Conservative	Mark Thompson	2,234	30	
Labour	Jasmine Kennedy	1261	17	
Labour	Arfan Asif	995	13	
Green	Susan Lee-Richards	289	4	
Liberal Democrats	Pippa Hepworth	213	3	
Liberal Democrats	Clare Kane	195	3	

=== Cleckheaton ward ===
Cleckheaton
Party	Candidate	Votes	%	±%
Liberal Democrats	John Lawson	2,318	53	+15.47
Conservative	Susie Bell Proctor	1049	24	−2.93
Labour Co-op	Tom Kowalski	887	20	−5.96
Green	Isabel Walters	136	3	−6.58

=== Colne Valley ward ===
Colne Valley
Party	Candidate	Votes	%	±%
Labour	Nell Griffiths	1,960	36	+17.17
Liberal Democrats	Nicola Turner	1866	34	−4.12
Conservative	Mathew Noble	1176	22	+9.13
Green	James McLeod	231	4	−5.39
UKIP	Melanie Roberts	198	4	−16.79

=== Crosland Moor and Netherton ward ===
Crosland Moor and Netherton
Party	Candidate	Votes	%	±%
Labour	Erin Hill	2,328	47	+0.11
Conservative	Tony McGrath	1176	24	−4.53
TUSC	Mike Forster	701	14	+11.46
Liberal Democrats	Robert Iredale	242	5	−1.97
UKIP	Susan Laird	213	4	+4.00
Green	Robert Barraclough	194	4	−4.80
Independent	Steve Bradbury	98	2	−4.26

=== Dalton ward ===
Dalton
Party	Candidate	Votes	%	±%
Labour	Peter McBride	1,778	53	+7.97
Conservative	Sarah Brightmore	874	26	+6.31
Liberal Democrats	Roger Battye	421	13	+0.53
Green	Simon Duffy	221	7	−3.44
Democrats and Veterans	Joshua Pearce	74	2	+2.00

=== Denby Dale ward ===
Denby Dale
Party	Candidate	Votes	%	±%
Conservative	Billy Jewitt	2,592	47	
Labour	Will Simpson	2355	43	
Green	Nick Brook	391	7	
Liberal Democrats	Waheed Anwar	153	3	

=== Dewsbury East ward ===
Dewsbury East
Party	Candidate	Votes	%	±%
Labour	Cathy Scott	1,900	42	
Conservative	Mark Eastwood	1437	32	
Dewsbury Borough Independents - Heavy Woollen District	Aleks Lukic	877	20	
Liberal Democrats	Dennis Hullock	157	3	
Green	Tony Kelsall	120	3	

=== Dewsbury South ward ===
Dewsbury South
Party	Candidate	Votes	%	±%
Labour	Masood Ahmed	3,360	70	
Conservative	James Spivey	875	18	
Green	Adrian Cruden	208	4	
Dewsbury Borough Independents - Heavy Woollen District	Anthony Penny-Whitworth	193	4	
Liberal Democrats	Bernard Disken	153	3	

=== Dewsbury West ward ===
Dewsbury West
Party	Candidate	Votes	%	±%
Labour	Mumtaz Hussain	3,667	76	
Conservative	Sean Guy	626	13	
Liberal Democrats	Kingsley Hill	307	6	
Green	Simon Cope	250	5	

=== Golcar ward ===
Golcar
Party	Candidate	Votes	%	±%
Labour	Richard Murgatroyd	1,876	40	
Liberal Democrats	Andrew Marchington	1723	37	
Conservative	Jacqueline Walker	838	18	
Green	Ian Vincent	231	5	

=== Greenhead ward ===
Greenhead
Party	Candidate	Votes	%	±%
Labour	Mohan Sokhal	3,637	71	
Conservative	Robert McGuin	818	16	
Green	John Phillips	420	8	
Liberal Democrats	Manjit Singh	252	5	

=== Heckmondwike ward ===
Heckmondwike
Party	Candidate	Votes	%	±%
Labour	Viv Kendrick	2,377	59	
Conservative	Rob Thornton	1235	31	
Green	Alan Freeman	247	6	
Liberal Democrats	Josie Pugsley	150	4	

=== Holme Valley North ward ===
Holme Valley North
Party	Candidate	Votes	%	±%
Independent	Terry Lyons	2,078	39	
Labour	Suzanne Gannon	1622	31	
Conservative	Elena Bunbury	1313	25	
Liberal Democrats	Gina Dungworth	173	3	
Democrats and Veterans	Joshua Dalton	108	2	

=== Holme Valley South ward ===
Holme Valley South
Party	Candidate	Votes	%	±%
Conservative	Nigel Patrick	2,758	46	
Labour	Paul Davies	2350	39	
Green	Susan Macklin	480	8	
Liberal Democrats	Mark Holroyd	278	5	
Democrats and Veterans	James Dalton	135	2	

=== Kirkburton ward ===
Kirkburton
Party	Candidate	Votes	%	±%
Conservative	Bill Armer	2,269	47	
Green	Derek Hardcastle	1399	29	
Labour	Paul Connolly	1072	22	
Liberal Democrats	Richard Farnhill	90	2	

=== Lindley ward ===
Lindley
Party	Candidate	Votes	%	±%
Liberal Democrats	Cahal Burke	2,578	44	
Conservative	Adam Gregg	1850	32	
Labour	Yusra Hussain	1020	17	
Independent	Mike Chalker	256	4	
Green	Peter Taylor	140	2	

=== Liversedge and Gomersal ward ===
Liversedge and Gomersal
Party	Candidate	Votes	%	±%
Conservative	David Hall	2,462	58	
Labour	Jude McKaig	1504	35	
Green	Nicholas Whittingham	180	4	
Liberal Democrats	David Snee	127	3	

=== Mirfield ward ===
Mirfield
Party	Candidate	Votes	%	±%
Conservative	Vivien Lees-Hamilton	3,270	59	
Labour	Julie Spencer	1715	31	
Green	Catherine Whittingham	359	7	
Liberal Democrats	Stephen Bird	167	3	

=== Newsome ward ===
Newsome
Party	Candidate	Votes	%	±%
Green	Karen Allison	2,215	51.5	▼0.4
Labour	Jo Lawson	1,593	37.0	▼2.0
Conservative	Charlie Reid	366	8.5	▲1.8
Liberal Democrats	Andrew Wilkinson	75	1.7	▼0.7
Yorkshire	Bikatshi Katenga	56	1.3	New
Majority		622	14.5	▲1.6
Registered electors		12,317		
Turnout		4,313	35.0	▼3.6
Rejected ballots		8	0.2	▼0.6
Green hold		Swing	▲0.8	
