= 2004 Kirklees Metropolitan Borough Council election =

2004 local election in England

Map of the results

Elections to Kirklees Metropolitan Borough Council were held on 10 June 2004. The whole council was up for election with boundary changes since the last election in 2003. The council stayed under no overall control.

== Council results ==
2004 Kirklees Metropolitan Borough Council election
Party	Candidates						Votes		
Party	Stood	Elected	Gained	Unseated	Net	% of total	%	No.	Net %
Labour	69	17	-	-	-	24.6	28.2	103,688	-
Liberal Democrats	69	25	-	-	-	36.2	27.6	101,351	-
Conservative	69	22	-	-	-	31.9	27.1	99,724	-
Green	47	3	-	-	-	4.3	9.8	35,909	-
BNP	16	1	-	-	-	1.4	5.6	20,672	-
Independent	3	1	-	-	-	1.4	1.0	3,560	-
UKIP	2	0	-	-	-	0.0	0.4	1,451	-
Liberal	1	0	-	-	-	0.0	0.2	578	-
Socialist Alternative	3	0	-	-	-	0.0	0.1	446	-
Monster Raving Loony	1	0	-	-	-	0.0	0.1	307	-

== Council Composition ==
After the election the composition of the council was:

↓
25	22	17	3	1	1
Liberal Democrats	Conservative	Labour	Gr	B	I

Party	New council
Liberal Democrats	25
Conservative	22
Labour	17
Green	3
BNP	1
Independent	1
Total	69

== Ward results ==
=== Almondbury ward ===
Almondbury
Party	Candidate	Votes	%	±%
Liberal Democrats	Ann Denham	2,058	13.1	−
Liberal Democrats	John Smithson	1,958	12.5	−
Liberal Democrats	Linda Wilkinson	1,787	11.4	−
Conservative	Alison Rogers	1,257	8.0	−
Conservative	Diana Hall	1,109	7.1	−
Conservative	William Armer	1,049	6.7	−
Labour	Timothy Holden-Rowley	976	6.2	−
Green	Brian Strudwick	973	6.2	−
Labour	Melvyn Holdsworth	900	5.7	−
BNP	Susan Auty	883	5.6	−
Labour	David Harvey	796	5.1	−
Green	Nicholas Ayres	688	4.4	−
Independent	Ian Brooke	672	4.3	−
Green	Barry Ward	614	3.9	−
Turnout		-	47.0	−

=== Ashbrow ward ===
Ashbrow
Party	Candidate	Votes	%	±%
Labour	Ken Smith	2,076	13.5	−
Labour	Deryck Hillas	2,065	13.4	−
Labour	Jean Calvert	2,050	13.3	−
Liberal Democrats	Richard Pinnock	1,698	11.0	−
Liberal Democrats	Sandra Gordon-Overton	1,506	9.8	−
Liberal Democrats	Emma Bone	1,379	9.0	−
Conservative	Trevor Bellamy	1,178	7.7	−
Conservative	John Taylor	1,130	7.3	−
Conservative	William Jacobs	1,111	7.2	−
Green	Edward Adams	560	3.6	−
Green	Melanie Adams	328	2.1	−
Green	David Arundell	314	2.0	−
Turnout		-	45.2	−

=== Batley East ward ===
Batley East
Party	Candidate	Votes	%	±%
Labour	Mohamed Mayet	3,024	17.4	−
Labour	Mary Harkin	2,697	15.5	−
Labour	Mahmood Akhtar	2,370	13.6	−
Liberal Democrats	Jon Bloom	2,008	11.6	−
Liberal Democrats	Haroon Bhamji	1,750	10.1	−
Liberal Democrats	Shujjat Ali	1,564	9.0	−
Conservative	Phillip Stocks	1,053	6.1	−
BNP	Jillian Exley	958	5.5	−
Conservative	Mohammed Akram	758	4.4	−
Conservative	Wasim Younas	639	3.7	−
Green	Janice Cronin	553	3.2	−
Turnout		-	59.3	−

=== Batley West ward ===
Batley West
Party	Candidate	Votes	%	±%
Labour	Shabir Pandor	2,070	13.5	−
Liberal Democrats	Paul Battye	2,063	13.5	−
Liberal Democrats	Geoffrey Alvy	1,773	11.6	−
Liberal Democrats	David Lowe	1,772	11.6	−
Labour	Gwenneth Grailey	1,748	11.4	−
Labour	Michael Williams	1,503	9.8	−
BNP	Jonathan Pygott	1,408	9.2	−
Conservative	Marlene Williams	929	6.1	−
Conservative	Sharon Light	837	5.5	−
Conservative	Kevin O'Donnell	802	5.2	−
Green	Gillian Redshaw	416	2.7	−
Turnout		-	50.1	−

=== Birstall and Birkenshaw ward ===
Birstall and Birkenshaw
Party	Candidate	Votes	%	±%
Conservative	Andrew Palfreeman	2,444	17.4	−
Conservative	Robert Light	2,434	17.4	−
Conservative	Elizabeth Smaje	2,136	15.3	−
BNP	John Wilkinson	1,383	9.9	−
Labour	Mark Martin	1,343	9.6	−
Labour	Natalie Pinnock-Hamilton	1,026	7.3	−
Labour	Russell Khan	976	7.0	−
Liberal Democrats	Jean Tasker	668	4.8	−
Green	Clive Lord	634	4.5	−
Liberal Democrats	Christine Bloom	557	4.0	−
Liberal Democrats	Eric Townend	405	2.9	−
Turnout		-	47.9	−

=== Cleckheaton ward ===
Cleckheaton
Party	Candidate	Votes	%	±%
Liberal Democrats	Kath Pinnock	2,362	16.2	−
Liberal Democrats	Andrew Pinnock	2,030	13.9	−
Liberal Democrats	Ann Raistrick	2,014	13.8	−
BNP	Richard Brown	1,752	12.0	−
Conservative	David Walker	1,310	9.0	−
Conservative	Joseph Calder	1,026	7.0	−
Labour	Michael Ramsden	1,021	7.0	−
Labour	John Dick	989	6.8	−
Conservative	Malcolm Smith	918	6.3	−
Labour	Naheed Arshad-Mather	670	4.6	−
Green	Natalie Holdsworth	462	3.2	−
Turnout		-	50.8	−

=== Colne Valley ward ===
Colne Valley
Party	Candidate	Votes	%	±%
Liberal Democrats	Gordon Beever	2,381	14.3	−
Liberal Democrats	Margaret Fearnley	2,241	13.5	−
Conservative	Dorothy Lindley	2,114	12.7	−
Liberal Democrats	David Ridgway	2,053	12.3	−
Conservative	Karen Tweed	1,120	6.7	−
BNP	Alan Clark	1,075	6.5	−
Conservative	Annabel Herriott	1,013	6.1	−
Labour	Neil Colquhoun	814	4.9	−
Labour	Helen Singleton	763	4.6	−
Labour	John Olswang	721	4.3	−
Green	Anne Lacey	693	4.2	−
Green	Sandra Leyland	678	4.1	−
UKIP	Peter Reeve	561	3.4	−
Green	Clare Porter	406	2.4	−
Turnout		-	50.3	−

=== Crosland Moor and Netherton ward ===
Crosland Moor and Netherton
Party	Candidate	Votes	%	±%
Labour	Molly Walton	2,842	16.6	−
Liberal Democrats	Mohammad Sarwar	2,463	14.4	−
Liberal Democrats	Shahida Awan	2,378	13.9	−
Liberal Democrats	Ian Rutter	2,170	12.7	−
Labour	Mohammad Iqbal	1,624	9.5	−
Labour	Susan May	1,491	8.7	−
Conservative	Peter Simpson	1,158	6.8	−
Conservative	Bronwen Robinson	1,124	6.6	−
Conservative	John Travis	1,095	6.4	−
Green	David Hill	804	4.7	−
Turnout		-	54.0	−

=== Dalton ward ===
Dalton
Party	Candidate	Votes	%	±%
Labour	Peter McBride	1,581	12.0	−
Liberal Democrats	Roger Battye	1,544	11.8	−
Labour	Angela Ellam	1,356	10.3	−
Labour	James Shires	1,342	10.2	−
Liberal Democrats	Eleanor Ritchie	1,267	9.7	−
Liberal Democrats	Alistair Cheetham	1,081	8.2	−
Conservative	Roger Jessop	845	6.4	−
BNP	Andrew Watson	751	5.7	−
Conservative	Paul King	630	4.8	−
Liberal	Elaine Sims	578	4.4	−
Conservative	Greg Christofi	567	4.3	−
Green	David Honour	499	3.8	−
Green	Tony Brooks	440	3.4	−
Green	Betty Cunnington	359	2.7	−
Independent	Colin Walder	285	2.2	−
Turnout		-	41.6	−

=== Denby Dale ward ===
Denby Dale
Party	Candidate	Votes	%	±%
Labour	Maggie Blanshard	2,196	13.0	−
Conservative	Elaine Ward	2,092	12.4	−
Conservative	William Dodds	2,069	12.3	−
Labour	Robert Allen	1,907	11.3	−
Labour	Graham Turner	1,871	11.1	−
Conservative	Patricia Hargreaves	1,758	10.4	−
BNP	Nicola King	914	5.4	−
Green	Andrew Stimson	804	4.8	−
Green	Deborah Turnbull	773	4.6	−
Liberal Democrats	Peter Clark	701	4.2	−
Liberal Democrats	Jeanette McCready	606	3.6	−
Green	Stephen Turnbull	586	3.5	−
Liberal Democrats	Patricia Milner	578	3.4	−
Turnout		-	52.0	−

=== Dewsbury East ward ===
Dewsbury East
Party	Candidate	Votes	%	±%
Labour	Paul Kane	1,930	13.6	−
Liberal Democrats	Dennis Hullock	1,922	13.5	−
Labour	Eric Firth	1,796	12.6	−
BNP	Colin Auty	1,665	11.7	−
Liberal Democrats	Gary Denison	1,585	11.2	−
Liberal Democrats	Nisar Choudhary	1,414	10.0	−
Labour	Irene Ellis	1,409	9.9	−
Conservative	John Nottingham	721	5.1	−
Conservative	Robert Haycroft	713	5.0	−
Conservative	Brian Whittaker	651	4.6	−
Green	Kevin Birley	393	2.8	−
Turnout		-	46.7	−

=== Dewsbury South ward ===
Dewsbury South
Party	Candidate	Votes	%	±%
Conservative	Khizar Iqbal	2,832	17.3	−
Conservative	Imtiaz Ameen	2,677	16.4	−
Conservative	Jonathan Scott	2,000	12.2	−
Labour	Masood Ahmed	1,783	10.9	−
BNP	Nicholas Cass	1,652	10.1	−
Labour	Alan Gibson	1,633	10.0	−
Labour	Gulfam Asif	1,454	8.9	−
Liberal Democrats	Adrian Cruden	706	4.3	−
Liberal Democrats	Bernard Disken	605	3.7	−
Liberal Democrats	Stephen Bird	586	3.6	−
Green	Gillian Jolly	440	2.7	−
Turnout		-	57.9	−

=== Dewsbury West ward ===
Dewsbury West
Party	Candidate	Votes	%	±%
Liberal Democrats	Karam Hussain	2,764	17.5	−
Liberal Democrats	Naz Hussain	2,492	15.8	−
Liberal Democrats	Keith Oldroyd	2,475	15.7	−
Labour	Mohammed Razaq	1,737	11.0	−
Labour	Sakandar Ahmed	1,717	10.9	−
Labour	Paul Ellis	1,652	10.5	−
BNP	Frank Atack	1,116	7.1	−
Conservative	Keith Sibbald	586	3.7	−
Conservative	James Taylor	445	2.8	−
Conservative	William Mair	408	2.6	−
Green	Peter Cunnington	390	2.5	−
Turnout		-	52.8	−

=== Golcar ward ===
Golcar
Party	Candidate	Votes	%	±%
Liberal Democrats	Christine Iredale	1,920	13.4	−
Liberal Democrats	Robert Iredale	1,911	13.3	−
Liberal Democrats	Andrew Marchington	1,854	12.9	−
Labour	Mark Ewington	1,217	8.5	−
Conservative	Jackie Firth	1,097	7.6	−
Labour	Ian Leedham	1,066	7.4	−
Green	Lesley Hedges	1,018	6.3	−
Conservative	Robert McSweeney	1,000	7.0	−
Labour	Patricia Colling	971	6.8	−
Conservative	Judith Roberts	911	6.3	−
Green	Richard Murgatroyd	748	5.2	−
Green	Steven Searby	652	4.5	−
Turnout		-	41.8	−

=== Greenhead ward ===
Greenhead
Party	Candidate	Votes	%	±%
Labour	Mehboob Khan	3,665	18.9	−
Labour	Annie Smith	3,439	17.7	−
Labour	Mohan Sokhal	3,263	16.8	−
Liberal Democrats	Linda Wild	1,751	9.0	−
Liberal Democrats	Mohammed Saeed	1,750	9.0	−
Liberal Democrats	Jim O'Reilly	1,489	7.7	−
Green	Paul Cooney	771	4.0	−
Conservative	Joan Osborn	744	3.8	−
Conservative	Martin Rodgers	726	3.7	−
Conservative	Carole Rogers	697	3.6	−
Green	Joan Smithson	559	2.9	−
Green	John Philips	538	2.8	−
Turnout		-	53.5	−

=== Heckmondwike ward ===
Heckmondwike
Party	Candidate	Votes	%	±%
BNP	David Exley	2,076	14.1	−
Labour	David Sheard	1,718	11.7	−
Liberal Democrats	Tabasum Aslam	1,688	11.5	−
Liberal Democrats	Colin Battye	1,496	10.2	−
Labour	Florence Smith	1,436	9.8	−
Liberal Democrats	Julie Brooke	1,317	9.0	−
Conservative	Richard Howarth	1,276	8.7	−
Conservative	Zahoor Akhtar	1,079	7.3	−
Labour	Peter Sykes	1,043	7.1	−
Conservative	Roger Roberts	988	6.7	−
Green	Heidi Smithson	589	4.0	−
Turnout		-	53.0	−

=== Holme Valley North ward ===
Holme Valley North
Party	Candidate	Votes	%	±%
Independent	Terry Lyons	2,603	15.2	−
Liberal Democrats	Marie Bower	2,026	11.8	−
Liberal Democrats	Mike Bower	1,903	11.1	−
Liberal Democrats	David Woodhead	1,653	9.6	−
Conservative	Neil Craven	1,650	9.6	−
Conservative	Richard Dixon	1,503	8.8	−
Conservative	Margaret Marsden	1,334	7.8	−
Labour	Carol Hirst	799	4.7	−
Labour	Mike Walker	786	4.6	−
Labour	Bill Tankard	784	4.6	−
Green	Roger Cummings	719	4.2	−
Green	Elizabeth Rainer	568	3.3	−
Green	Clementina Herrero-Eaton	498	2.9	−
Monster Raving Loony	Boney Maroney	307	1.8	−
Turnout		-	53.3	−

=== Holme Valley South ward ===
Holme Valley South
Party	Candidate	Votes	%	±%
Conservative	Donald Firth	3,252	16.9	−
Conservative	Ken Sims	3,090	16.1	−
Conservative	Nigel Patrick	2,810	14.6	−
Labour	Catherine Ingham	1,431	7.4	−
Labour	Louise Baldock	1,389	7.2	−
Labour	Christopher Chapple	1,327	6.9	−
Liberal Democrats	Ruth Jackson	1,269	6.6	−
Liberal Democrats	Gavin MacPherson	1,111	5.8	−
Liberal Democrats	Arthur Pritchard	1,057	5.5	−
Green	Leslie Bailey	902	4.7	−
Green	Siobhan Smith	815	4.2	−
Green	Iain Smith	760	4.0	−
Turnout		-	51.0	−

=== Kirkburton ward ===
Kirkburton
Party	Candidate	Votes	%	±%
Conservative	Adrian Murphy	2,116	13.1	−
Conservative	Mark Hemingway	2,065	12.8	−
Conservative	Christine Smith	2,005	12.4	−
Green	Derek Hardcastle	2,000	12.4	−
Green	Cheryll Battye	1,704	10.6	−
Green	Richard Burton	1,583	9.8	−
Labour	Claire Rogers	915	5.7	−
Labour	Michael Greetham	888	5.5	−
BNP	Russell Scott	836	5.2	−
Labour	Julie Bellanfante	780	4.8	−
Liberal Democrats	Gerald Edinburgh	645	4.0	−
Liberal Democrats	Briony Garnett	321	2.0	−
Liberal Democrats	Rochelle Parchment	288	1.8	−
Turnout		-	48.0	−

=== Lindley ward ===
Lindley
Party	Candidate	Votes	%	±%
Liberal Democrats	Christine Stanfield	2,377	13.9	−
Liberal Democrats	Tony Woodhead	2,301	13.4	−
Conservative	Tony Brice	1,849	10.8	−
Liberal Democrats	David Payne	1,758	10.2	−
Conservative	Royston Rogers	1,640	9.6	−
Conservative	Ravi Showan	1,510	8.8	−
Labour	Maxwell McMurdo	1,075	6.3	−
Labour	Douglas Morgan	1,001	5.8	−
Labour	Donald Cameron	988	5.8	−
UKIP	Helen Martinek	890	5.2	−
Green	Claire Plunkett	655	3.8	−
Green	Richard Plunkett	576	3.4	−
Green	Eric Biddulph	536	3.1	−
Turnout		-	49.0	−

=== Liversedge and Gomersal ward ===
Liversedge and Gomersal
Party	Candidate	Votes	%	±%
Conservative	Margaret Bates	2,245	15.0	−
Conservative	Derrick Yates	2,122	14.2	−
Conservative	David Hall	2,075	13.9	−
Labour	Gordon North	1,749	11.7	−
BNP	Robert Ryan	1,478	9.9	−
Labour	Ann Foxton	1,463	9.8	−
Labour	Stephen Hall	1,412	9.5	−
Liberal Democrats	Neil Bentley	764	5.1	−
Liberal Democrats	Kia Etherington	734	4.9	−
Liberal Democrats	Kathryn Sykes	453	3.0	−
Green	Robert Walters	432	2.9	−
Turnout		-	48.0	−

=== Mirfield ward ===
Mirfield
Party	Candidate	Votes	%	±%
Conservative	Martyn Bolt	3,661	19.7	−
Conservative	Kathleen Taylor	3,166	17.0	−
Conservative	Beverley Warby	2,947	15.9	−
BNP	Karl Hanson	2,016	10.9	−
Labour	Michael Hutchinson	1,663	9.0	−
Labour	Roy Dobson	1,519	8.2	−
Labour	Barbara Jones	1,141	6.1	−
Liberal Democrats	Brian Firth	688	3.7	−
Liberal Democrats	Maureen Oldroyd	657	3.5	−
Green	Ian McCourtie	626	3.4	−
Liberal Democrats	John Warnes	493	2.7	−
Turnout		-	52.0	−

=== Newsome ward ===
Newsome
Party	Candidate	Votes	%	±%
Green	Andrew Cooper	2,006	14.8	−
Green	Julie Stewart-Turner	1,965	14.5	−
Green	Sharon Fallows	1,882	13.8	−
Labour	Jamil Akhtar	1,062	7.8	−
Labour	Garth Pratt	950	7.0	−
Liberal Democrats	Kuldip Brar	868	6.4	−
Labour	Elsie Wheatley	829	6.1	−
Liberal Democrats	Anne Thornton	772	5.7	−
BNP	Alan Milton	709	5.2	−
Liberal Democrats	David Crossley	673	5.0	−
Conservative	Neil Drake	548	4.0	−
Conservative	Stephen Halstead	460	3.4	−
Conservative	Anne Henderson	420	3.1	−
Socialist Alternative	Jean Goodison	245	1.8	−
Socialist Alternative	Dylan Murphy	101	0.7	−
Socialist Alternative	Michael Forster	100	0.7	−
Turnout		-	43.0	−
