= 2021 Kirklees Metropolitan Borough Council election =

2021 UK local government election

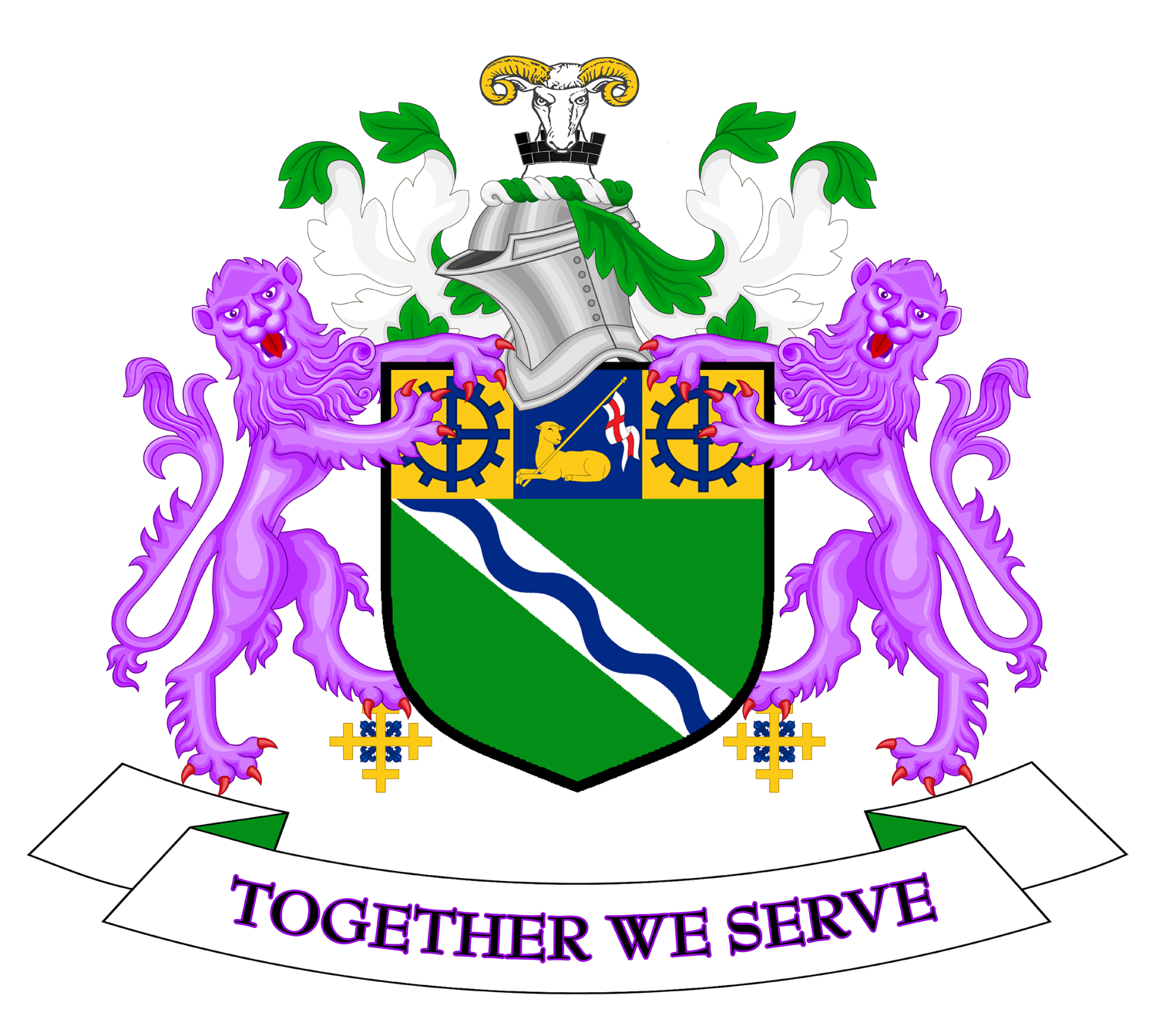
- Thursday 6 May 2021

23 of the 69 seats on Kirklees Metropolitan Borough Council 35 seats needed for a majority

	First party	Second party	Third party
Leader	Shabir Pandor	David Hall	John Lawson
Party	Labour	Conservative	Liberal Democrats
Leader's seat	Batley West	Liversedge and Gomersal	Cleckheaton
Seats before	32	17	10
Seats after	33	19	9
Seat change	▲1	▲2	▼1
- Map showing the results of the 2021 Kirklees Metropolitan Borough Council election
Council control before election
No overall control
Elected Council control
No overall control

The 2021 Kirklees Metropolitan Borough Council election took place on 6 May 2021 to elect members of Kirklees Council in England. This was on the same day as other local elections across the United Kingdom.. One-third of the seats were up for election, with two wards Almondbury (Birstall & Birkenshaw and Golcar) electing two councillors.

== Background ==
Result of the council election when these seats were last contested in 2018

The Local Government Act 1972 created a two-tier system of metropolitan counties and districts covering Greater Manchester, Merseyside, South Yorkshire, Tyne and Wear, the West Midlands, and West Yorkshire starting in 1974. Kirklees was a district of the West Yorkshire metropolitan county. The Local Government Act 1985 abolished the metropolitan counties, with metropolitan districts taking on most of their powers as metropolitan boroughs. The West Yorkshire Combined Authority was established in 2014 and began electing the mayor of West Yorkshire in 2021.

In November 2020, 3 Labour Councillors resigned in protest over the handling of the suspension of Jeremy Corbyn. This resulted in Labour losing overall control of Kirklees Council.

== Results summary ==
2021 Kirklees Metropolitan Borough Council election
Party	This election				Full council			This election		
Party	Candidates	Seats	Net	Seats %	Other	Total	Total %	Votes	Votes %	+/−
Labour	25	12	▲1	47.1	21	33	47.8	42,488	35.9	▼0.8
Conservative	25	9	▲2	34.6	10	19	27.5	44,974	38.0	▲12.8
Liberal Democrats	25	2	▼1	7.7	7	9	13.0	12,022	10.2	▼4.1
Green	25	1	Steady	3.8	2	3	4.3	12,292	10.4	▼2.3
Independent	4	0	Steady	0.0	3	3	4.3	4,700	4.0	▲1.1
Heavy Woollen Independents	1	1	Steady	3.8	0	1	1.4	692	0.6	New
Dewsbury Borough Independents	{{{candidates}}}	0	Steady	0.0	1	1	1.4	0	0.0	▼1.7
Yorkshire	3	0	Steady	0.0	0	0	0.0	527	0.4	New
Freedom Alliance	5	0	Steady	0.0	0	0	0.0	328	0.3	New
Reform	1	0	Steady	0.0	0	0	0.0	83	0.1	New
Five Star Direct Democracy	1	0	Steady	0.0	0	0	0.0	67	0.1	New
Heritage	1	0	Steady	0.0	0	0	0.0	27	<0.1	New
SDP	1	0	Steady	0.0	0	0	0.0	23	<0.1	New

== Ward results ==
=== Almondbury ===
Almondbury
Party	Candidate	Votes	%	±%
Conservative	Bernard McGuin	2,533	51.21	▲23.99
Liberal Democrats	Patrycja Bartosinka	1,170	23.66	▼2.33
Labour	Tyler Hawkins	846	17.10	▼8.70
Green	Peter Taylor	322	6.51	▼3.00
Freedom Alliance	Emma Kirkham	52	1.05	N/A
SDP	John Whittaker	23	0.47	N/A
Majority		1,363	27.56	▲26.33
Turnout		4,946		
Conservative hold		Swing		

=== Ashbrow ===
Ashbrow
Party	Candidate	Votes	%	±%
Labour	James Homewood	2,258	49.81	▼8.51
Conservative	Tony Butler	1,595	35.26	▲6.38
Green	Joan Smithson	447	9.88	▼2.13
Liberal Democrats	Manjit Singh	224	4.95	▲1.16
Majority		663	14.66	▼17.77
Turnout		4,524		
Labour hold		Swing		

=== Batley East ===
Batley East
Party	Candidate	Votes	%	±%
Labour	Fazila Loonat	3,520	67.56	▼2.22
Conservative	Keiron Gavaghan	1,160	22.26	▲10.37
Green	James Hansford	308	5.91	▲2.79
Liberal Democrats	Christopher Kane	139	2.67	▼2.29
Reform	Dave Carrington	83	1.59	N/A
Majority		2,390	45.87	▼12.02
Turnout		5,210		
Labour hold		Swing		

=== Batley West ===
Batley West
Party	Candidate	Votes	%	±%
Labour	Shabir Pandor	2,950	57.08	▼5.42
Conservative	Lewis Roberts	1,501	29.04	▲14.74
Green	Jack Senior	293	5.67	▲1.30
Independent	John Duggan	251	4.86	N/A
Liberal Democrats	Stephen Long	173	3.35	▼0.09
Majority		1,449	28.04	
Turnout		5,168		
Labour hold		Swing		

=== Birstall and Birkenshaw ===
Birstall and Birkenshaw (2 seats)
Party	Candidate	Votes	%	±%
Conservative	Mark Thompson	2,449	50.74	
Conservative	Joshua Sheard	2,175	45.06	
Labour	Gina Harding	1,121	23.22	
Labour	Julie Smith	977	20.24	
Green	Ross Peltier	419	8.68	
Green	Ty Akram	361	7.48	
Liberal Democrats	Louise Walsh	238	4.93	
Liberal Democrats	David Shepherd	225	4.66	
Majority				
Turnout		4,827		
Total votes		7,965		
Conservative hold		Swing		

=== Cleckheaton ===
Cleckheaton
Party	Candidate	Votes	%	±%
Liberal Democrats	Kath Pinnock	2,422	48.68	▼6.93
Conservative	Piers Briggs	1,728	34.73	▲20.21
Labour	J Hayat	589	11.84	▼0.41
Green	Nicholas Whittingham	236	4.74	▲2.29
Majority		694	13.95	▼26.49
Turnout		4,975	36.87	
Liberal Democrats hold		Swing		

=== Colne Valley ===
Colne Valley
Party	Candidate	Votes	%	±%
Labour	Matthew McLoughlin	2,156	37.16	▲4.74
Conservative	Trevor Bellamy	1,895	32.66	▲14.65
Liberal Democrats	Nicola Turner	1,358	23.41	▼7.69
Green	Julia Norman	393	6.77	▼0.14
Majority		261	4.50	▲3.18
Turnout		5,802		
Labour gain from Independent		Swing		

=== Crosland Moor and Netherton ===
Crosland Moor and Netherton
Party	Candidate	Votes	%	±%
Labour	Manisha Kaushik	2,490	50.65	▼2.59
Conservative	Neil Allsopp	1,470	29.90	▲11.59
Green	Chris Green	413	8.40	▲0.83
Liberal Democrats	Suzanne Barraclough	324	6.59	▲0.86
Independent	Steve Bradbury	149	3.03	▲0.21
Freedom Alliance	Clare Wilson	70	1.42	N/A
Majority		1,020	20.75	▼14.18
Turnout		4,916		
Labour hold		Swing		

=== Dalton ===
Dalton
Party	Candidate	Votes	%	±%
Labour	Naheed Mather	1,535	40.17	▼3.35
Conservative	Eileen Marchant	1,382	36.17	▲19.81
Green	Clare Walters	529	13.84	▲8.72
Liberal Democrats	Roger Battye	375	9.81	▼5.74
Majority		153	4.00	▼20.04
Turnout		3,821		
Labour hold		Swing		

=== Denby Dale ===
Denby Dale
Party	Candidate	Votes	%	±%
Conservative	Tim Bamford	2,880	47.85	▲2.15
Labour	Graham Turner	2,398	39.84	▼8.57
Green	Andrew Stimson	444	7.38	N/A
Liberal Democrats	Craig Armistead	218	3.62	▼2.27
Freedom Alliance	Jonathan Tilt	79	1.31	N/A
Majority		482	8.01	
Turnout		6,019		
Conservative gain from Labour		Swing		

=== Dewsbury East ===
Dewsbury East
Party	Candidate	Votes	%	±%
Labour	Eric Firth	1,902	43.21	+3
Conservative	Keith Mallinson	1,343	30.51	+19
Heavy Woollen Independents	Mark Thackray	692	15.72	−26
Green	Simon Duffy	156	3.54	−
Liberal Democrats	Dennis Hullock	150	3.41	−
Yorkshire	Dan Woodlock	138	3.0	N/A
Majority		559		
Labour hold		Swing		

=== Dewsbury South ===
Dewsbury South
Party	Candidate	Votes	%	±%
Labour	Jackie Ramsay	2,259	41.37	−23
Conservative	Imtiaz Ameen	1,534	28.1	+10.5
Independent	Khizar Iqbal	1,361	24.93	New Party
Liberal Democrats	Bernard Disken	156	2.86	−4
Green	Marnie Cope	150	2.75	−7.5
Majority		725		
Labour hold		Swing		

=== Dewsbury West ===
Dewsbury West
Party	Candidate	Votes	%	±%
Labour	Mussarat Pervaiz	3,159	55.3	−17
Conservative	Basharat Rafiq	1,467	25.68	+13
Independent	Tanisha Bramwell	627	11.18	New Party
Green	Simon Cope	154	2.7	−6.5
Yorkshire	Emma Stirling	183	3.0	New Party
Liberal Democrats	John Rossington	122	2.14	−3.5
Majority		1,692		
Labour hold		Swing		

=== Golcar ===
Golcar (2 seats)
Party	Candidate	Votes	%	±%
Labour	Elizabeth Reynolds	1,394	32.85	
Liberal Democrats	Robert Iredale	1,392	32.80	
Labour	Dathan Tedesco	1,141	26.89	
Conservative	Isaac Barnett	1,069	25.19	
Conservative	Jackie Walker	1,049	24.72	
Liberal Democrats	Gina Dungworth	1,002	23.61	
Green	Nina Roberts	433	10.20	
Green	Ian Vincent	272	6.41	
Freedom Alliance	Ruth Lewis	74	1.74	
Majority		251		
Labour gain from Independent				
Liberal Democrats hold		Swing		

=== Greenhead ===
Greenhead
Party	Candidate	Votes	%	±%
Labour	Sheikh Ullah	3,003	57.73	−7
Conservative	David Daniel	1,083	20.82	+11
Green	Sarah Newton	831	15.97	+6
Liberal Democrats	Howard Cohen	285	5.48	−2
Majority		1,920		
Labour hold		Swing		

=== Heckmondwike ===
Heckmondwike
Party	Candidate	Votes	%	±%
Labour	Steve Hall	2,095	45.22	−2.5
Conservative	Itrat Ali	1,947	42.02	+22
Green	Alan Freeman	391	8.44	−1
Liberal Democrats	Josie Pugsley	200	4.32	−
Majority		148		
Labour hold		Swing		

=== Holme Valley North ===
Holme Valley North
Party	Candidate	Votes	%	±%
Independent	Charles Greaves	2,024	34.82	−2
Conservative	Tony McGrath	1,911	32.88	+15
Labour	Harry McCarthy	1,278	21.99	+2
Green	Jeffrey Fox	346	5.95	−2
Liberal Democrats	Kingsley Hill	173	2.98	−1.5
Freedom Alliance	Rebecca Curtis-Haries	53	1.0	New Party
Heritage	Susan Laird	27	0.4	New Party
Majority		113		
Independent hold		Swing		

=== Holme Valley South ===
Holme Valley South
Party	Candidate	Votes	%	±%
Conservative	Donald Firth	3,289	46.89	+18.5
Labour	Moses Crook	2,511	35.8	+4
Green	Darryl Gould	490	6.99	−3.5
Liberal Democrats	Caroline Anstey	451	6.43	−3
Yorkshire	Will Thompson	206	2.9	New Party
5 Star Direct Democracy Party	James Dalton	67	0.9	New Party
Majority		778		
Conservative hold		Swing		

=== Kirkburton ===
Kirkburton
Party	Candidate	Votes	%	±%
Conservative	Richard Smith	2,913	54.34	+8
Green	David Knight	1,835	34.23	−
Labour	Imran Safdar	552	10.3	−5.5
Liberal Democrats	Waheed Anwar	61	1.14	−2
Majority		1,078		
Conservative hold		Swing		

=== Lindley ===
Lindley
Party	Candidate	Votes	%	±%
Conservative	Adam Gregg	2,417	39.66	+9.5
Liberal Democrats	Richard Eastwood	2,172	35.64	+3
Labour	Audrey Owen	1,131	18.56	−4
Green	Christine Parker	373	6.15	+1
Majority		245		
Conservative gain from Liberal Democrats		Swing		

=== Liversedge and Gomersal ===
Liversedge and Gomersal
Party	Candidate	Votes	%	±%
Conservative	Melanie Stephen	2,801	58.23	−3
Labour	Jude McKaig	1,207	25.09	+2
Green	Linda Simmons	321	6.67	−3
Independent	Tracey King	288	5.99	New Party
Liberal Democrats	David Snee	193	4.01	−2
Majority		1,594		
Conservative hold		Swing		

=== Mirfield ===
Mirfield
Party	Candidate	Votes	%	±%
Conservative	Martyn Bolt	4,266	69.06	+10
Labour	Geoff Kernan	1,230	19.91	+2
Green	Catherine Whittingham	523	8.47	−9.5
Liberal Democrats	Stephen Bird	158	2.56	−3
Majority		3,036		
Conservative hold		Swing		

=== Newsome ===
Newsome
Party	Candidate	Votes	%	±%
Green	Andrew Cooper	2,592	60.97	−2
Labour	Pauline Wheat-Bowen	1,102	25.92	−2
Conservative	Maria Ackroyd	488	11.48	+5.5
Liberal Democrats	Andrew Wilkinson	69	1.62	−1
Majority		1,490		
Green hold		Swing		
