= 2015 Kirklees Metropolitan Borough Council election =

2015 local election in England

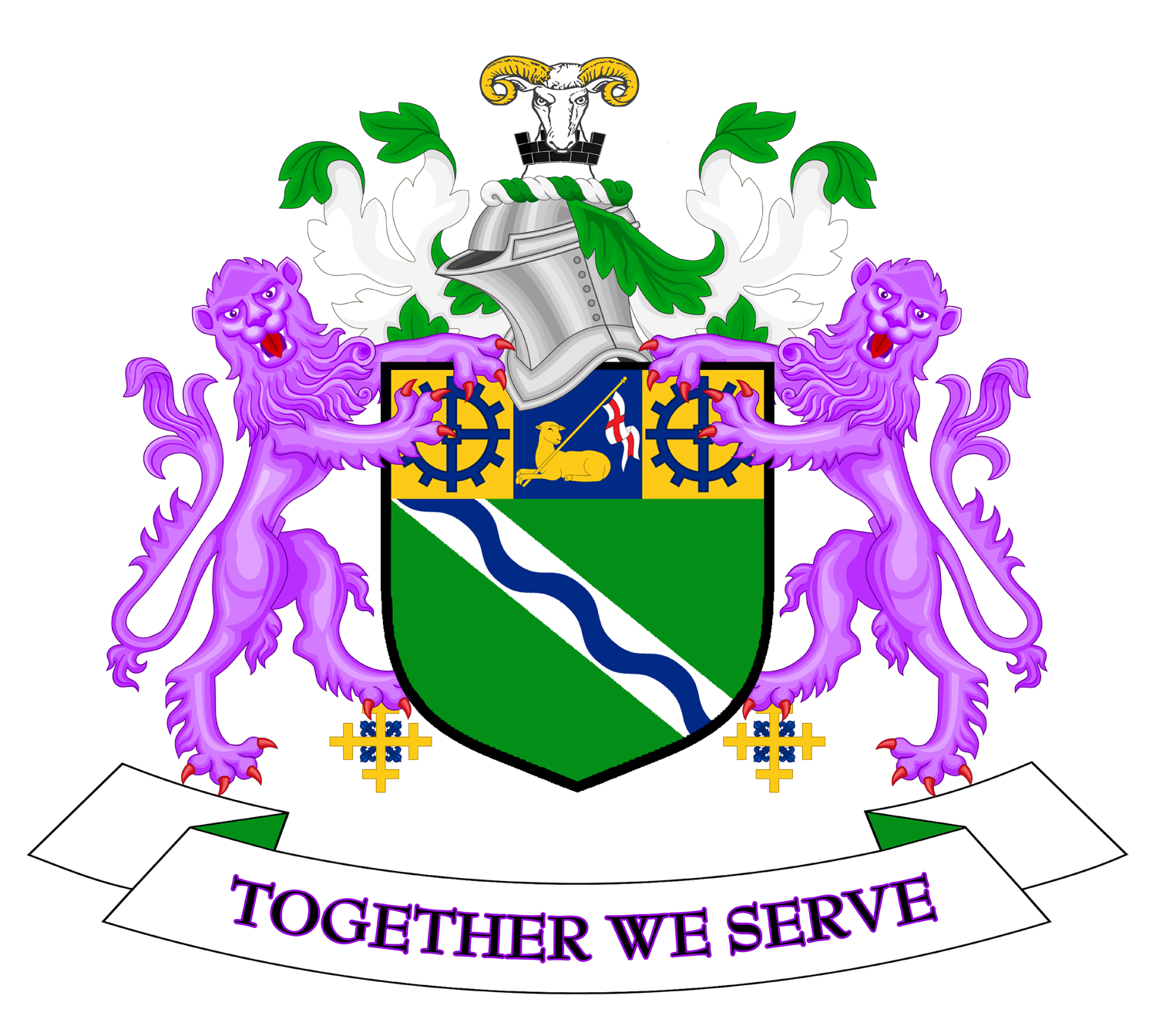
- May 5, 2015

24 of the 69 seats on Kirklees Metropolitan Borough Council 35 seats needed for a majority
	First party	Second party	Third party
Leader	David Sheard	David Hall	Nicola Turner
Party	Labour	Conservative	Liberal Democrats
Leader's seat	Heckmondwike	Liversedge and Gomersal	Colne Valley
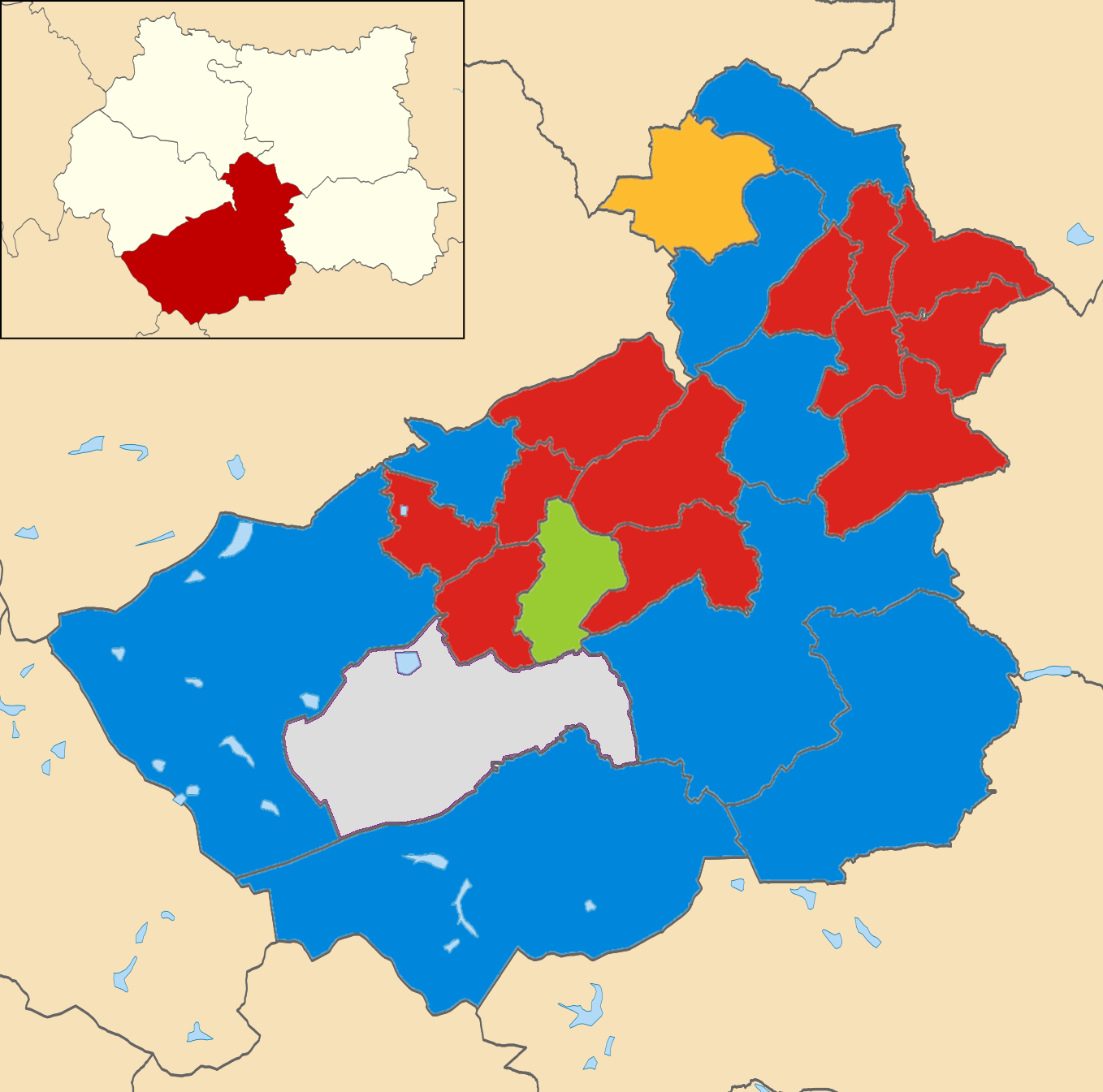
- 2015 local election results in Kirklees

The 2015 Kirklees Metropolitan Borough Council election took place on 7 May 2015 to elect members of Kirklees Metropolitan Borough Council in England. This was on the same day as other local elections.

== Council make up ==
After the 2015 local election, the political make up of the council was as follows:

Party	Number of councillors
Labour	34
Conservative	18
Liberal Democrats	10
Green	4
Independent	3

== Ward results ==
=== Almondbury ward ===
Almondbury
Party	Candidate	Votes	%	±%
Labour	Judith Hughes	2,393	27.5	
Conservative	Bernard William McGuin	2,262	26.0	
Liberal Democrats	Alison Munro	1,998	29.9	
UKIP	Richard Allan	1,393	16.0	
Green	Benjamin Wightman	506	5.8	
Independent	Melvin Gray	88	1.0	
TUSC	Eddie Price	76	0.9	
Majority		131		
Turnout		8,716	62.59	
Labour gain from Liberal Democrats		Swing		

=== Ashbrow ward ===
Ashbrow
Party	Candidate	Votes	%	±%
Labour	Amanda Pinnock	3,878	47.5	
Conservative	Homma Abid	2,081	25.5	
UKIP	Fred Tidball	1,159	14.2	
Green	Joan Smithson	471	5.8	
Liberal Democrats	Baljiit Singh Aujla	437	5.3	
TUSC	June Jones	143	1.8	
Majority		1,797		
Turnout		8,169	58.66	
Labour hold		Swing		

=== Batley East ward ===
Batley East
Party	Candidate	Votes	%	±%
Labour	Amanda Stubley	5,321	62.9	
Conservative	Mohammed Lahe	2,194	25.9	
Liberal Democrats	Jon Bloom	463	5.5	
Green	Cass Whitingham	359	4.2	
TUSC	Peter Robson	122	1.4	
Majority		3,127		
Turnout		8,4459	66.14	
Labour hold		Swing		

=== Batley West ward ===
Batley West
Party	Candidate	Votes	%	±%
Labour Co-op	Marielle O'Neill	5,040	61.2	
Conservative	Susie Bell Proctor	2,124	25.8	
Green	Garry Kitchin	495	6.0	
Liberal Democrats	Stephen Leach	329	4.0	
TUSC	John Rattigan	242	2.9	
Majority		2,916		
Turnout		8,230	62.13	
Labour hold		Swing		

=== Birstall and Birkenshaw ward ===
Birstall and Birkenshaw
Party	Candidate	Votes	%	±%
Conservative	Andrew Palfreeman	3,594	43.9	
Labour	Dathan Tedesco	2,189	26.8	
UKIP	Joyce Avril Holbrook	1,767	21.6	
Green	Elizabeth Kitchin	320	3.9	
Liberal Democrats	Megan Scholefield-Nicholson	309	3.8	
Majority		1,405		
Turnout		8,179	65.06	
Conservative hold		Swing		

=== Cleckheaton ward ===
Cleckheaton
Party	Candidate	Votes	%	±%
Liberal Democrats	Andrew Pinnock	3,010	35.2	
Conservative	Andrew Gray	2,002	23.4	
Labour	Ken Lowe	1,647	19.2	
UKIP	Colin Walshaw	1,593	18.6	
Green	Catherine Stoyles	250	2.9	
TUSC	Phillip Buck	55	0.6	
Majority		1,008		
Turnout		8,557	64.15	
Liberal Democrats hold		Swing		

=== Colne Valley ward ===
Colne Valley
Party	Candidate	Votes	%	±%
Conservative	Donna Bellamy	2,930	30.9	
Labour	Robert Walker	2,433	25.6	
Liberal Democrats	Gordon Beever	2,264	23.9	
UKIP	Melanie Roberts	962	10.1	
Green	John Goodwin	819	8.6	
TUSC	Dylan Murphy	84	0.9	
Majority		497		
Turnout		9,492	69.75	
Conservative hold		Swing		

=== Crosland Moor and Netherton ward ===
Crosland Moor and Netherton
Party	Candidate	Votes	%	±%
Labour	Mohammad Sarwar	3,982	46.0	
Conservative	Imran Shahzad Safdar	2,218	25.6	
UKIP	Paul George	1,067	12.3	
Green	Chas Ball	669	7.7	
Liberal Democrats	Olivia Turner	488	5.6	
TUSC	Jason Edward Bowen	134	1.5	
Independent	Steve Bradbury	102	1.2	
Majority		1,765		
Turnout		8,660	65.29	
Labour hold		Swing		

=== Dalton ward ===
Dalton
Party	Candidate	Votes	%	±%
Labour	Musarrat Khan	2,695	36.4	
Conservative	Maria Ackroyd	1,750	23.7	
UKIP	Tom Wise	1,461	19.8	
Liberal Democrats	Roger David Battye	793	10.7	
Green	David Honour	393	8.0	
TUSC	Jack McLean	104	1.4	
Majority		945		
Turnout		7,396	58.13	
Labour hold		Swing		
