= 1998 Kirklees Metropolitan Borough Council election =

20th century British metropolitan election

Elections to Kirklees Metropolitan Borough Council were held on 7 May 1998. One third of the council was up for election and the Labour party kept overall control of the council.

After the election, the composition of the council was

- Labour 43
- Liberal Democrat 20
- Conservative 7
- Green Party 2

== Election result ==
Kirklees local election result 1998
Party	Seats	Gains	Losses	Net gain/loss	Seats %	Votes %	Votes	+/−
Labour	10			-4	41.7			
Liberal Democrats	9			+3	37.5			
Conservative	4			+2	16.7			
Green	1			+1	4.2			
Independent	0			-2	0			
