= 2019 Kirklees Metropolitan Borough Council election =

2019 UK local government election

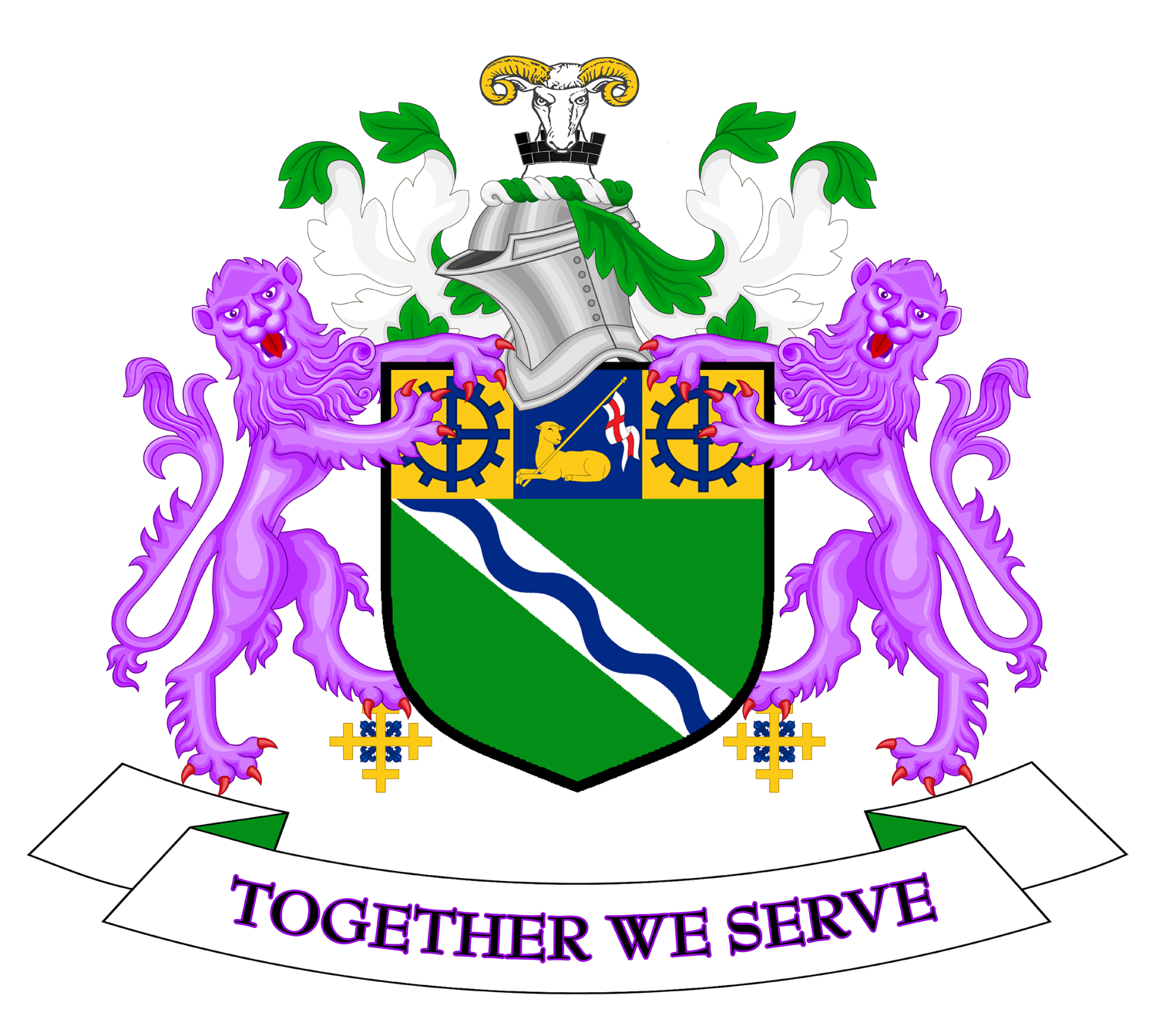
- Thursday 2 May 2019

23 of the 69 seats on Kirklees Metropolitan Borough Council 35 seats needed for a majority

	First party	Second party	Third party
Leader	Shabir Pandor	David Hall	John Lawson
Party	Labour	Conservative	Liberal Democrats
Leader's seat	Batley West	Liversedge and Gomersal	Cleckheaton
Seats before	38	17	8
Seats after	36	16	10
Seat change	▼2	▼1	▲2
- Map showing the results of the 2019 Kirklees Metropolitan Borough Council election
Council control before election
Labour
Elected Council control
Labour

The 2019 Kirklees Metropolitan Borough Council election took place on 2 May 2019 to elect members of Kirklees Metropolitan Borough Council in England. This was on the same day as other local elections.

== Results summary ==
2019 Kirlees Metropolitan Borough Council election
Party	This election			Full council			This election		
Party	Seats	Net	Seats %	Other	Total	Total %	Votes	Votes %	+/−
Labour	11	▼1	47.8	24	36	50.7	37,976	36.7	
Conservative	5	▼3	21.7	12	16	24.6	26,055	25.2	
Liberal Democrats	4	▲3	17.4	6	10	14.5	14,812	14.3	
Green	1	Steady	4.3	2	3	4.3	13,105	12.7	
Independent	1	Steady	4.3	2	3	4.3	2,987	2.9	
Dewsbury Borough Independents	1	▲1	0.0	0	1	1.4	1,766	1.7	
UKIP	0	Steady	0.0	0	0	0.0	3,763	3.6	
Batley Borough Independents	0	Steady	0.0	0	0	0.0	1,959	1.9	
Democrats and Veterans	0	Steady	0.0	0	0	0.0	926	0.9	

== Ward results ==
=== Almondbury ===
Almondbury
Party	Candidate	Votes	%	±%
Liberal Democrats	Paola Davies	1,988	45.5	
Conservative	James Spivey	989	22.6	
Labour	Julia Green-Wiles	895	20.5	
Green	Tricia Moores	500	11.4	
Majority				
Turnout				
Liberal Democrats gain from Labour		Swing		

=== Ashbrow ===
Ashbrow
Party	Candidate	Votes	%	±%
Labour	Amanda Pinnock	1,882	50.8	
Conservative	Dominic Gill	981	26.5	
Green	Brenda Smithson	574	15.5	
Liberal Democrats	Andrew McCraig	267	7.2	
Majority				
Turnout				
Labour hold		Swing		

=== Batley East ===
Batley East
Party	Candidate	Votes	%	±%
Labour Co-op	Habiban Zaman	3,183	70.5	
Conservative	Keiron Gavaghan	778	17.2	
Green	James Hansford	384	8.5	
Liberal Democrats	Clare Kane	172	3.8	
Majority				
Turnout				
Labour Co-op hold		Swing		

=== Batley West ===
Batley West
Party	Candidate	Votes	%	±%
Labour	Yusra Hussain	2,599	48.3	
Batley Borough Independents	Paul Halloran	1,959	36.4	
Conservative	Paul Young	588	10.9	
Green	Martin Pelan	134	2.5	
Liberal Democrats	Christopher Kane	97	1.8	
Majority				
Turnout				
Labour hold		Swing		

=== Birstall & Birkenshaw ===
Birstall & Birkenshaw
Party	Candidate	Votes	%	±%
Conservative	Charlotte Goodwin	2,000	53.8	
Labour Co-op	Catherin Pinder	847	22.8	
Green	Christopher Green	510	13.7	
Liberal Democrats	Louise Walsh	360	9.7	
Majority				
Turnout				
Conservative hold		Swing		

=== Cleckheaton ===
Cleckheaton
Party	Candidate	Votes	%	±%
Liberal Democrats	Andrew Pinnock	2,650	64.5	
Conservative	Madeleine Poutney	618	15.1	
Green	Linda Simmons	457	11.1	
Labour	Khalid Patel	381	9.3	
Majority				
Turnout				
Liberal Democrats hold		Swing		

=== Colne Valley ===
Colne Valley
Party	Candidate	Votes	%	±%
Labour	Lesley Warner	1,542	29.8	
Liberal Democrats	Robert Iredale	1,333	25.7	
Conservative	Donna Bellamy	1,300	25.1	
UKIP	Melanie Roberts	577	11.1	
Green	Karen How	429	8.3	
Majority				
Turnout				
Labour gain from Conservative		Swing		

=== Crosland Moor & Netherton ===
Crosland Moor & Netherton
Party	Candidate	Votes	%	±%
Labour	Mohammad Sarwar	2,218	51.5	
Conservative	Tony Mcgrath	769	17.9	
Green	Robert Barraclough	404	9.4	
UKIP	David Thorpe	394	9.1	
Liberal Democrats	Kingsley Hill	293	6.8	
Independent	Steve Bradbury	230	5.3	
Majority				
Turnout				
Labour hold		Swing		

=== Dalton ===
Dalton
Party	Candidate	Votes	%	±%
Labour	Mus Khan	1,334	38.5	
UKIP	Keith Taylor	635	18.3	
Conservative	Sarah Brightmore	572	16.5	
Liberal Democrats	Roger Battye	566	16.3	
Green	Simon Duffy	361	10.4	
Majority				
Turnout				
Labour hold		Swing		

=== Denby Dale ===
Denby Dale
Party	Candidate	Votes	%	±%
Conservative	Michael Watson	2,037	41.5	
Labour	Jackie Ramsay	1,591	32.4	
Liberal Democrats	Alison Baskeyfield	676	13.8	
Green	Clare Walters	604	12.3	
Majority				
Turnout				
Conservative hold		Swing		

=== Dewsbury East ===
Dewsbury East
Party	Candidate	Votes	%	±%
Dewsbury Borough Independents	Aleks Lukic	1,766	41.6	
Labour	Eric Firth	1,695	40.0	
Conservative	Sean Guy	489	11.5	
Liberal Democrats	Dennis Hullock	150	3.5	
Green	Gideon Richards	141	3.3	
Majority				
Turnout				
Dewsbury Borough Independents gain from Labour				

=== Dewsbury South ===
Dewsbury South
Party	Candidate	Votes	%	±%
Labour	Nosheen Ded	2,627	64.3	
Conservative	Charlie Reid	725	17.8	
Green	Marnie Cope	445	10.9	
Liberal Democrats	Bernard Diskin	286	7.0	
Majority				
Turnout				
Labour hold		Swing		

=== Dewsbury West ===
Dewsbury West
Party	Candidate	Votes	%	±%
Labour	Darren O'Donovan	3,198	72.1	
Conservative	Farmida Ishaq	569	12.8	
Green	Simon Cope	408	9.2	
Liberal Democrats	Jon Bloom	259	5.8	
Majority				
Turnout				
Labour hold		Swing		

=== Golcar ===
Golcar
Party	Candidate	Votes	%	±%
Liberal Democrats	Andrew Marchington	1,876	41.8	
Labour	Hilary Richards	1,265	28.2	
UKIP	Carole Harrison	603	13.4	
Conservative	Jacqueline Walker	403	9.0	
Green	Ian Vincent	340	7.6	
Majority				
Turnout				
Liberal Democrats gain from Labour		Swing		

=== Greenhead ===
Greenhead
Party	Candidate	Votes	%	±%
Labour	Carole Pattison	2,963	65.0	
Conservative	Paulin McGleenan	456	10.0	
Green	John Phillips	455	10.0	
UKIP	Nick Martinek	343	7.5	
Liberal Democrats	Howard Cohen	342	7.5	
Majority				
Turnout				
Labour hold		Swing		

=== Heckmondwike ===
Heckmondwike
Party	Candidate	Votes	%	±%
Labour	Aafaq Butt	2,044	47.9	
Conservative	Helen Gavaghan	852	20.0	
Independent	Alan Girvan	785	18.4	
Green	Alan Freeman	401	9.4	
Liberal Democrats	Josie Pugsley	187	4.4	
Majority				
Turnout				
Labour hold		Swing		

=== Holme Valley North ===
Holme Valley North
Party	Candidate	Votes	%	±%
Independent	Paul White	1,850	37.1	
Labour	John Heneghan	1,009	20.2	
Conservative	Trevor Bellamy	901	18.1	
UKIP	Susan Laird	473	9.5	
Green	Sonia King	413	8.3	
Liberal Democrats	Gina Dungworth	225	4.5	
Democrats and Veterans	Joshua Dalton	120	2.4	
Majority				
Turnout				
Independent gain from Independent		Swing		

=== Holme Valley South ===
Holme Valley South
Party	Candidate	Votes	%	±%
Labour	Paul Davies	1,820	31.9	
Conservative	Ken Sims	1,613	28.2	
Democrats and Veterans	James Dalton	806	14.1	
Green	Darryl Gould	606	10.6	
Liberal Democrats	Caroline Anstey	539	9.4	
UKIP	Stefan Dransfield	330	5.8	
Majority				
Turnout				
Labour gain from Conservative		Swing		

=== Kirkburton ===
Kirkburton
Party	Candidate	Votes	%	±%
Conservative	John Taylor	2,013	46.1	
Green	Derek Hardcastle	1,506	34.5	
Labour	Neil Denby	696	15.9	
Liberal Democrats	John Rossington	150	3.4	
Majority				
Turnout				
Conservative hold		Swing		

=== Lindley ===
Lindley
Party	Candidate	Votes	%	±%
Liberal Democrats	Anthony Smith	1,785	32.3	
Conservative	Adam Gregg	1,661	30.1	
Labour	Lisa Hogarth	1,262	22.9	
UKIP	John Livsey	408	7.4	
Green	Peter Taylor	280	5.1	
Independent	Mike Chalker	122	2.2	
Majority				
Turnout				
Liberal Democrats gain from Conservative		Swing		

=== Liversedge & Gomersal ===
Liversedge & Gomersal
Party	Candidate	Votes	%	±%
Conservative	Lisa Holmes	2,544	61.6	
Labour	Jude McKaig	942	22.8	
Green	Nicholas Eugene	406	9.8	
Liberal Democrats	David Snee	241	5.8	
Majority				
Turnout				
Conservative hold		Swing		

=== Mirfield ===
Mirfield
Party	Candidate	Votes	%	±%
Conservative	Kathleen Taylor	2,931	58.7	
Green	Catherine Helen	892	17.9	
Labour	Kieron Dunn	891	17.9	
Liberal Democrats	Stephen Bird	275	5.5	
Majority				
Turnout				
Conservative hold		Swing		

=== Newsome ===
Newsome
Party	Candidate	Votes	%	±%
Green	Susan Lee-Richards	2,455	62.8	
Labour	Chris Owen	1,092	27.9	
Conservative	Scarlett Black	266	6.8	
Liberal Democrats	Andrew Wilkinson	95	2.4	
Majority				
Turnout				
Green hold		Swing		
