= 2024 Kirklees Metropolitan Borough Council election =

2024 election in West Yorkshire, England

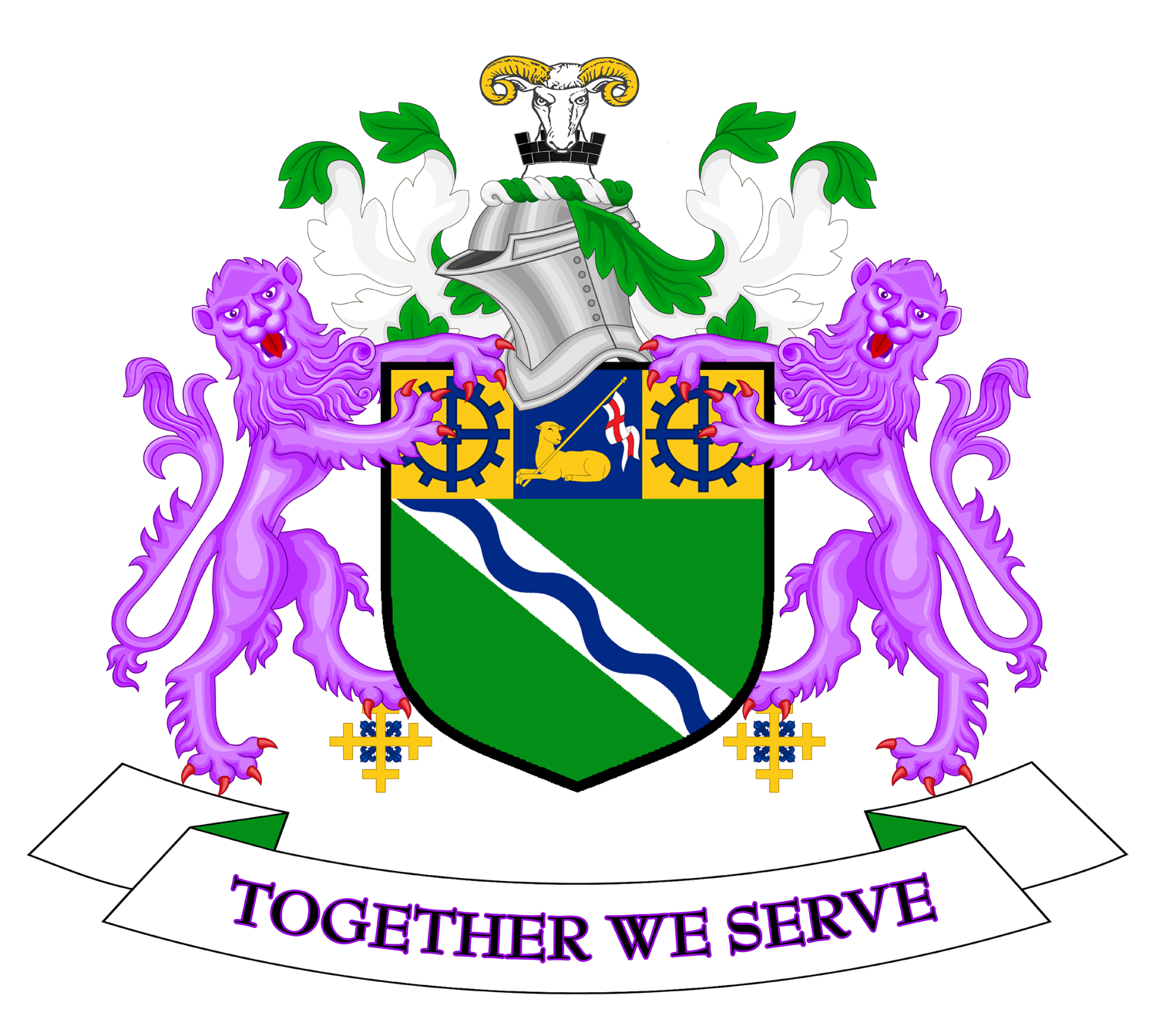
- 2 May 2024

23 out of 69 seats to Kirklees Metropolitan Borough Council 35 seats needed for a majority

	First party	Second party	Third party
Leader	Cathy Scott	David Hall
Party	Labour	Conservative	Independent
Leader's seat	Dewsbury East	Liversedge and Gomersal
Last election	39 seats, 42.6%	18 seats, 30.4%	1 seat, 2.5%
Seats before	35	18	5
Seats won	7	5	6
Seats after	31	15	9
Seat change	▼4	▼3	▲4
Popular vote	34,519	26,844	19,121
Percentage	31.2%	24.2%	17.3%
Swing	▼11.4%	▼6.2%	▲14.8%
	Fourth party	Fifth party
Leader	John Lawson	Andrew Cooper
Party	Liberal Democrats	Green
Leader's seat	Cleckheaton	Newsome
Last election	8 seats, 13.7%	3 seats, 10.5%
Seats before	8	3
Seats won	3	2
Seats after	10	4
Seat change	▲2	▲1
Popular vote	13,655	15,357
Percentage	12.3%	13.9%
Swing	▼1.3%	▲3.4%
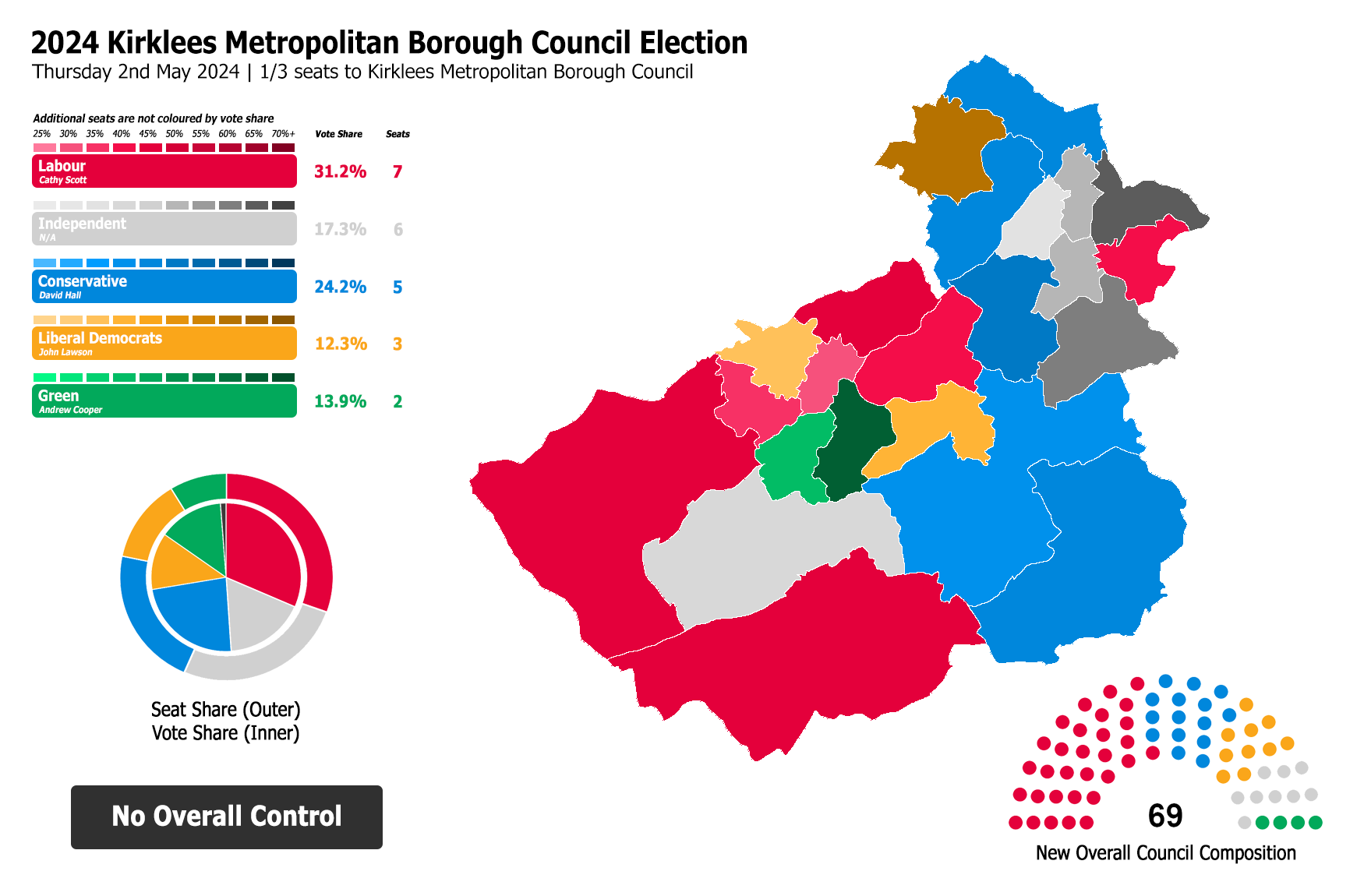
- Winner of each seat at the 2024 Kirklees Metropolitan Borough Council election
Leader before election
Cathy Scott
Labour
Leader after election
Cathy Scott
Independent
No overall control

The 2024 Kirklees Metropolitan Borough Council election took place on 2 May 2024 alongside the West Yorkshire mayoral election and other local elections across the United Kingdom.

Prior to the local elections, four Labour councillors resigned from the party in protest of the party's direction and policy regarding the Gaza war. The four members subsequently formed the Kirklees Community Independents Group, which had no seats up for election this year. With this exception, the pre-election council makeup had otherwise remained unchanged from the 2023 election.

Labour lost control of the council to no overall control. Following the election, the leader of the council, Cathy Scott, was replaced as Labour group leader by Carole Pattison. However, Cathy Scott managed to retain her position as leader of the council, leaving Labour along with four others to sit as a group of independents calling themselves the Community Alliance.

== Councillors standing down ==
Councillor	Ward	First elected	Party	Date announced
Naheed Mather	Dalton	2012	Labour	5 February 2024
Donald Firth	Holme Valley South	1989	Conservative	6 March 2024
Bernard McGuin	Almondbury	2016	Conservative	6 March 2024
Elizabeth Reynolds	Golcar	2021	Labour	6 March 2024
Adam Gregg	Lindley	2021	Conservative	6 March 2024
Melanie Stephen	Liversedge and Gomersal	2021	Conservative	6 March 2024

== Council composition ==
After 2023 election		Before 2024 election		After 2024 election	
Party	Seats	Party	Seats	Party	Seats
Labour	39	Labour	35	Labour	31
Conservative	18	Conservative	18	Conservative	15
Independent	1	Independent	5	Independent	9
Liberal Democrats	8	Liberal Democrats	8	Liberal Democrats	10
Green	3	Green	3	Green	4

== Summary ==
=== Election result ===
2024 Kirlees Metropolitan Borough Council election
Party	This election				Full council			This election		
Party	Candidates	Seats	Net	Seats %	Other	Total	Total %	Votes	Votes %	+/−
Labour	23	7	▼4	30.4	24	31	43.5	34,519	31.2	–11.4
Conservative	23	5	▼3	21.7	10	15	21.7	26,844	24.2	–6.2
Independent	12	6	▲4	26.1	3	9	14.5	19,121	17.3	+14.8
Liberal Democrats	23	3	▲2	13.0	7	10	14.5	13,655	12.3	–1.3
Green	23	2	▲1	8.7	2	4	5.8	15,357	13.9	+3.4
Reform	1	0	Steady	0.0	0	0	0.0	509	0.5	+0.2
Yorkshire	1	0	Steady	0.0	0	0	0.0	473	0.4	+0.3
TUSC	1	0	Steady	0.0	0	0	0.0	164	0.1	N/A
Heritage	1	0	Steady	0.0	0	0	0.0	88	0.1	N/A

== Ward results ==
Candidates nominated by ward:

=== Almondbury ===
Almondbury
Party	Candidate	Votes	%	±%
Liberal Democrats	David Longstaff	1,668	40.5	–5.8
Labour	Patricia Colling	983	23.9	+3.7
Conservative	Collins Ibor	955	23.2	–2.3
Green	Peter Taylor	514	12.5	+6.6
Majority		685	16.6	
Turnout		4,120	30.7	
Registered electors		13,440		
Liberal Democrats gain from Conservative		Swing	▼4.8	

=== Ashbrow ===
Ashbrow
Party	Candidate	Votes	%	±%
Labour	James Homewood*	1,970	47.8	–3.6
Conservative	Ian Roberts	803	19.5	–4.2
Green	Brenda Smithson	644	15.6	+5.5
Liberal Democrats	David Ridgway	538	13.1	+6.1
TUSC	Daniel Green	164	4.0	N/A
Majority		1,167	28.3	
Turnout		4,119	28.7	
Registered electors		14,333		
Labour hold		Swing	▲0.3	

=== Batley East ===
Batley East
Party	Candidate	Votes	%	±%
Independent	Aziz Daji	3,835	67.7	N/A
Labour	Phillip Lucitt	901	15.9	–28.4
Conservative	Neil Mayman	412	7.3	–36.7
Green	Simon Duffy	365	6.4	+0.7
Liberal Democrats	Jon Bloom	153	2.7	–3.2
Majority		2,934	51.8	
Turnout		5,666	42.9	
Registered electors		13,205		
Independent gain from Labour				

=== Batley West ===
Batley West
Party	Candidate	Votes	%	±%
Independent	Zahid Kahut	2,695	52.0	N/A
Labour	Shabir Pandor*	991	19.1	–40.3
Liberal Democrats	Stephen Bird	541	10.4	+0.5
Conservative	Fatima Riaz	519	10.0	–14.2
Green	John Phillips	439	8.5	+2.0
Majority		1,704	32.9	
Turnout		5,185	37.3	
Registered electors		13,891		
Independent gain from Labour				

=== Birstall & Birkenshaw ===
Birstall and Birkenshaw
Party	Candidate	Votes	%	±%
Conservative	Mark Thompson*	1,854	46.9	–2.3
Labour	Julie Smith	1,515	38.3	+1.8
Green	Tahir Akram	411	10.4	+6.1
Liberal Democrats	Louise Walsh	176	4.4	–4.2
Majority		339	8.6	
Turnout		3,956	30.7	
Registered electors		12,903		
Conservative hold		Swing	▼2.1	

=== Cleckheaton ===
Cleckheaton
Party	Candidate	Votes	%	±%
Liberal Democrats	Kathryn Pinnock*	2,823	63.7	–4.1
Conservative	Piers Briggs	746	16.8	–0.3
Labour	Jessica White	634	14.3	+3.3
Green	Martin Price	230	5.2	+1.1
Majority		2,077	46.9	
Turnout		4,433	32.6	
Registered electors		13,615		
Liberal Democrats hold		Swing	▼1.9	

=== Colne Valley ===
Colne Valley
Party	Candidate	Votes	%	±%
Labour Co-op	Matthew McLoughlin*	2,493	48.9	–1.5
Conservative	Isaac Barnett	1,049	20.6	–5.9
Liberal Democrats	Harry Marchington	615	12.1	–1.6
Yorkshire	Tim Millea	473	9.3	N/A
Green	Julia Norman	470	9.2	–0.3
Majority		1,444	28.3	
Turnout		5,100	37.2	
Registered electors		13,699		
Labour Co-op hold		Swing	▲2.2	

=== Crosland Moor & Netherton ===
Crosland Moor and Netherton
Party	Candidate	Votes	%	±%
Green	Alex Vickers	2,011	41.5	+17.0
Labour	Manisha Kaushik*	1,657	34.2	–18.1
Conservative	Trevor Bellamy	590	12.2	–5.4
Liberal Democrats	Suzanne Barraclough	331	6.8	+1.1
Independent	Mark Finch	257	5.3	N/A
Majority		354	7.3	
Turnout		4,846	34.8	
Registered electors		13,917		
Green gain from Labour		Swing	▲17.6	

=== Dalton ===
Dalton
Party	Candidate	Votes	%	±%
Labour	Munir Ahmed	1,492	44.3	–8.1
Conservative	Glenn Hirst	735	21.8	+1.0
Green	Clare Walters	569	16.9	+4.0
Liberal Democrats	Dominic Black	332	9.9	+0.3
Independent	Clare Holden	240	7.1	+2.9
Majority		757	22.5	
Turnout		3,368	26.9	
Registered electors		12,540		
Labour hold		Swing	▼4.6	

=== Denby Dale ===
Denby Dale
Party	Candidate	Votes	%	±%
Conservative	Timothy Bamford*	2,530	47.6	+6.9
Labour	Michelle Banks	2,089	39.3	–6.2
Green	Michael Shaw	310	5.8	+1.0
Independent	Lynne Carroll	230	4.3	±0.0
Liberal Democrats	James Wilkinson	151	2.8	–1.9
Majority		441	8.3	
Turnout		5,310	39.3	
Registered electors		13,508		
Conservative hold		Swing	▲6.6	

=== Dewsbury East ===
Dewsbury East
Party	Candidate	Votes	%	±%
Labour Co-op	Eric Firth*	1,534	40.7	–14.9
Liberal Democrats	Dennis Hullock	859	22.8	+12.4
Conservative	John Cowan	758	20.1	–7.9
Green	Gideon Richards	622	16.5	+10.5
Majority		675	17.9	
Turnout		3,773	26.5	
Registered electors		14,246		
Labour Co-op hold		Swing	▼13.7	

=== Dewsbury South ===
Dewsbury South
Party	Candidate	Votes	%	±%
Independent	Hanifa Darwan	3,443	62.3	N/A
Labour Co-op	Jackie Ramsay*	1,063	19.2	–46.5
Conservative	Sean Guy	455	8.2	–10.6
Independent	Shaun Maddox	228	4.1	N/A
Green	Nicholas Whittingham	155	2.8	–2.2
Liberal Democrats	Bernard Disken	94	1.7	–1.7
Independent	Richard Beck	87	1.6	–5.5
Majority		2,380	43.1	
Turnout		5,525	41.3	
Registered electors		13,385		
Independent gain from Labour Co-op				

=== Dewsbury West ===
Dewsbury West
Party	Candidate	Votes	%	±%
Independent	Tanisha Bramwell	3,109	53.2	N/A
Labour	Mussarat Pervaiz*	1,390	23.8	–33.0
Conservative	Sajid Hussain	855	14.6	–20.9
Green	Simon Cope	317	5.4	+0.8
Liberal Democrats	John Rossington	171	2.9	–0.2
Majority		1,719	29.4	
Turnout		5,842	40.9	
Registered electors		14,295		
Independent gain from Labour				

=== Golcar ===
Golcar
Party	Candidate	Votes	%	±%
Labour	Angela Sewell	1,656	39.0	+1.2
Liberal Democrats	Nicola Turner	1,520	35.8	–5.9
Conservative	Matthew Crompton	597	14.1	+1.9
Green	Heather Peacock	470	11.1	+4.6
Majority		136	3.2	
Turnout		4,243	30.7	
Registered electors		13,840		
Labour hold		Swing	▲3.6	

=== Greenhead ===
Greenhead
Party	Candidate	Votes	%	±%
Labour	Sheikh Ullah*	1,754	33.1	–34.2
Green	Maryam Jawaid	1,713	32.3	+19.5
Independent	Waseem Naeem	884	16.7	N/A
Conservative	Rob Speed	688	13.0	–0.6
Liberal Democrats	Manjit Singh	263	5.0	–1.3
Majority		41	0.8	
Turnout		5,302	37.3	
Registered electors		14,199		
Labour hold		Swing	▼26.9	

=== Heckmondwike ===
Heckmondwike
Party	Candidate	Votes	%	±%
Independent	Ali Arshad	1,554	36.8	N/A
Labour	Steve Hall*	1,470	34.8	–29.5
Conservative	Amin Hussain	612	14.5	–10.7
Liberal Democrats	Josie Pugsley	315	7.5	+1.6
Green	Graham Simpson	274	6.5	+1.9
Majority		84	2.0	
Turnout		4,225	31.5	
Registered electors		13,424		
Independent gain from Labour				

=== Holme Valley North ===
Holme Valley North
Party	Candidate	Votes	%	±%
Independent	Charles Greaves*	2,430	44.4	+19.2
Labour	Jayne Fisher	1,393	25.4	–3.4
Conservative	David Heathcote	1,186	21.7	–10.9
Green	Samuel Midgley	296	5.4	–0.9
Liberal Democrats	Howard Cohen	172	3.1	+0.2
Majority		1,037	19.0	
Turnout		5,477	40.5	
Registered electors		13,541		
Independent hold		Swing	▲11.3	

=== Holme Valley South ===
Holme Valley South
Party	Candidate	Votes	%	±%
Labour	Jane Rylah	2,916	45.3	–0.2
Conservative	Damian Brook	2,660	41.3	–0.9
Green	Darryl Gould	614	9.5	+1.7
Liberal Democrats	Ellen Griffiths	246	3.8	–0.7
Majority		256	4.0	
Turnout		6,436	42.4	
Registered electors		15,179		
Labour gain from Conservative		Swing	▲0.4	

=== Kirkburton ===
Kirkburton
Party	Candidate	Votes	%	±%
Conservative	Richard Smith*	1,995	42.8	–7.5
Labour	Edward Bowen	1,291	27.7	+4.5
Green	Andy Scott	1,089	23.4	+2.7
Liberal Democrats	Craig Wiles	152	3.3	–0.4
Independent	Miri Finch	129	2.8	+0.8
Majority		704	15.1	
Turnout		4,656	36.9	
Registered electors		12,632		
Conservative hold		Swing	▼6.0	

=== Lindley ===
Lindley
Party	Candidate	Votes	%	±%
Liberal Democrats	Ashleigh Robinson	2,036	36.0	–10.4
Conservative	Robert McGuin	1,879	33.3	+2.0
Labour	Tom Durrans-Cross	1,130	20.0	+3.7
Green	Richard Burton	517	9.2	+4.7
Heritage	Helen Parry	88	1.6	N/A
Majority		157	2.7	
Turnout		5,650	36.5	
Registered electors		15,497		
Liberal Democrats gain from Conservative		Swing	▼6.2	

=== Liversedge & Gomersal ===
Liversedge & Gomersal
Party	Candidate	Votes	%	±%
Conservative	Caroline Holt	1,867	46.3	–7.9
Labour	Erica Amende	1,511	37.4	+1.6
Green	Linda Simmons	400	9.9	+4.2
Liberal Democrats	David Snee	258	6.4	+2.1
Majority		356	8.9	
Turnout		4,036	29.2	
Registered electors		13,822		
Conservative hold		Swing	▼4.8	

=== Mirfield ===
Mirfield
Party	Candidate	Votes	%	±%
Conservative	Martyn Bolt*	2,827	50.7	+11.2
Labour	Geoff Kernan	1,794	32.2	–3.7
Reform	Sam Griffith-Jones	509	9.1	+2.9
Green	Catherine Whittingham	334	6.0	–7.4
Liberal Democrats	Stephen Long	116	2.1	–3.0
Majority		1,033	18.5	
Turnout		5,580	35.0	
Registered electors		15,724		
Conservative hold		Swing	▲7.5	

=== Newsome ===
Newsome
Party	Candidate	Votes	%	±%
Green	Andrew Cooper	2,593	66.8	+2.5
Labour	Mark Morris	892	23.0	–1.5
Conservative	Kath Bellamy	272	7.0	–0.6
Liberal Democrats	Waheed Anwar	125	3.2	+1.3
Majority		1,701	43.8	
Turnout		3,882	29.6	
Registered electors		13,129		
Green hold		Swing	▲2.0	

== Changes 2024–2026 ==
- Masood Ahmed, Yusra Hussain, Paul Moore, Cathy Scott, Adam Zaman and Habiban Zaman, all elected for Labour, left the party in May 2024 to sit as independents in a new group called the Community Alliance.
- Musarrat Khan, elected for Labour, also left the party in May 2024, sitting as an ungrouped independent.

=== By-elections ===
==== Holme Valley South ====
Holme Valley South by-election: 17 October 2024
Party	Candidate	Votes	%	±%
Conservative	Damian Brook	1,639	39.1	–2.2
Labour	Phillip Lucitt	1,134	27.0	–18.3
Green	Toby Cooper	734	17.5	+8.0
Reform	Susan Laird	511	12.2	N/A
Liberal Democrats	Howard Cohen	158	3.8	±0.0
Independent	Miri French	17	0.4	N/A
Majority		505	12.1	N/A
Turnout		4,193	27.2	–15.2
Registered electors		15,422		
Conservative gain from Labour		Swing	▲8.1	
