= 2026 Kirklees Council election =

2026 English local government election

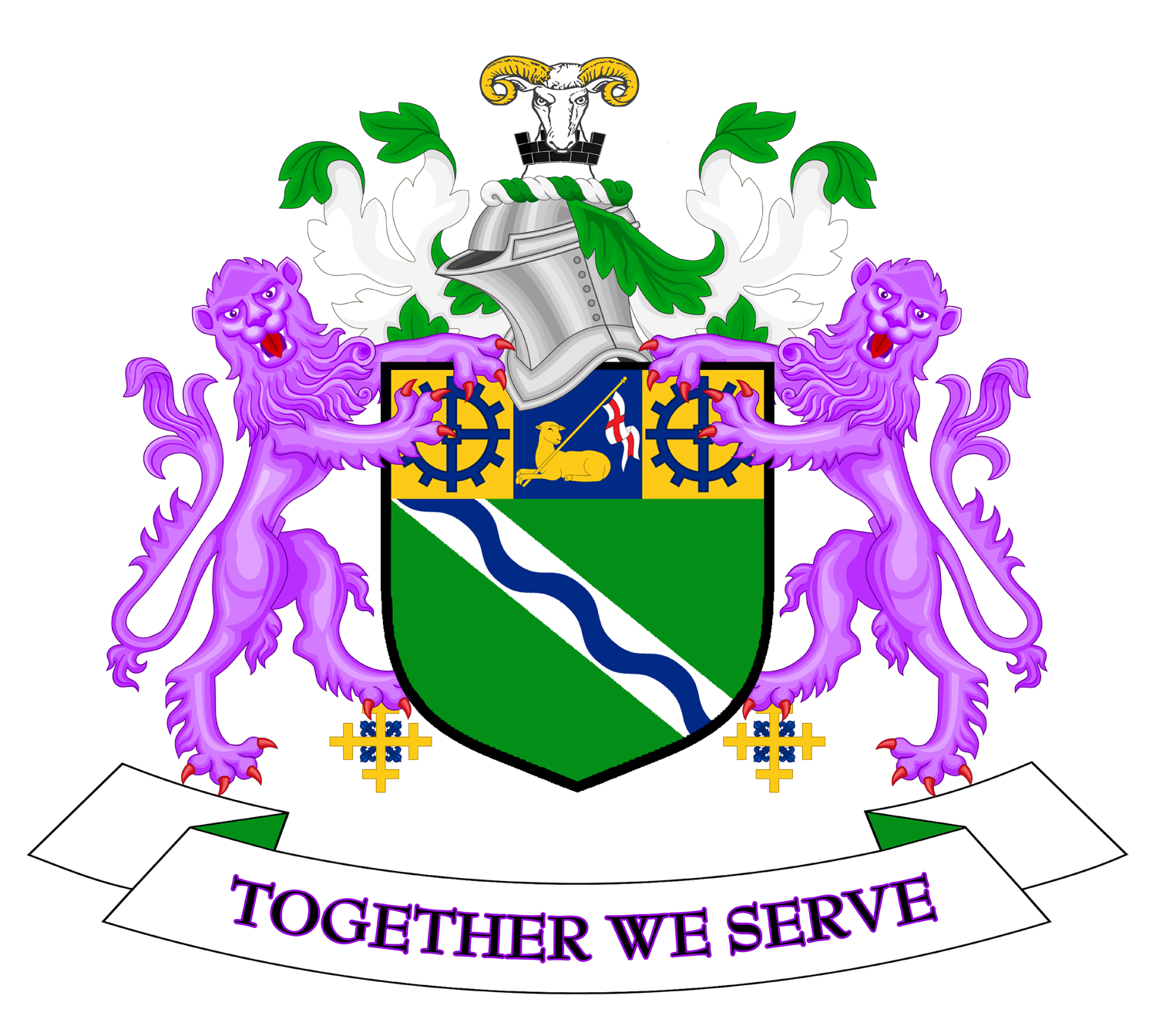
- 7 May 2026

All 69 seats to Kirklees Council 35 seats needed for a majority

	First party	Second party	Third party
Leader	Sarah Wood	(Note: Ali Arshad is the leader of the Kirklees Community Independents Group.)	Andrew Cooper
Party	Reform	Independent	Green
Last election	0 seats, 0.5%	9 seats, 17.3%	4 seats, 13.9%
Seats before	0	10 (Note: Of the 10 Independent councillors before the election, 3 sat in the Kirklees Community Independents Group and 7 were non-aligned.)	4
Seats after	29	14	12
Seat change	▲29	▲5	▲8
Popular vote	117,545	39,672	71,973
Percentage	30.0%	10.1%	18.3%
Swing	▲29.5pp	▼7.2pp	▲4.4pp
	Fourth party	Fifth party	Sixth party
Leader	David Hall defeated	John Lawson defeated	Carole Pattison defeated
Party	Conservative	Liberal Democrats	Labour
Last election	15 seats, 24.2%	10 seats, 12.3%	31 seats, 31.2%
Seats before	16	10	23
Seats after	9	5	0
Seat change	▼6	▼5	▼31
Popular vote	59,061	38,513	63,389
Percentage	15.1%	9.8%	16.2%
Swing	▼9.1pp	▼2.5pp	▼15.0pp
- Winner of each seat at the 2026 Kirklees Metropolitan Borough Council election
Leader before election
Carole Pattison
Labour
No overall control (Note: Labour minority.)
Leader after election
Sarah Wood
Reform UK
No overall control (Note: Reform minority.)

The 2026 Kirklees Council election took place on 7 May 2026 alongside other local elections across the United Kingdom. All 69 seats of Kirklees Council were elected.

Prior to the election, the council was under no overall control. Labour was the largest party and ran the council as a minority administration. At this election, the council remained under no overall control. Reform UK, which held no seats prior to the election, emerged as the largest party but fell six seats short of a majority. Labour went from being the largest party to having no seats on the council.

After the election, Reform chose Sarah Wood to be its group leader. It took over two months after the election before the council managed to agree a new administration; the council met and twice failed to agree the appointment of a leader of the council. Sarah Wood was eventually appointed as the leader of the council on 15 July 2026, leading a Reform minority administration.

== Background ==
As the previous 2024 election, Labour lost control of the council to no overall control.

== Council composition ==
After 2024 election		Before 2026 election		After 2026 election	
Party	Seats	Party	Seats	Party	Seats
Labour	31	Labour	23	Reform	29
Conservative	15	Conservative	16	Independent	14
Liberal Democrats	10	Liberal Democrats	9	Green	12
Green	4	Green	4	Conservative	9
Alliance	N/A	Alliance	6	Liberal Democrats	5
Independent	9	Independent	10	Labour	0
		Vacant	1		

Changes 2024–2026:

- May 2024: Masood Ahmed, Yusra Hussain, Mus Khan, Paul Moore, Cathy Scott, Adam Zaman, and Habiban Zaman (Labour) leave party to sit as independents
- September 2024: Paul Davies (Labour) resigns – by-election held October 2024
- October 2024: Damian Brook (Conservative) gains by-election from Labour
- January 2026: Community Alliance Kirklees formed – Masood Ahmed, Ammar Anwar, Yusra Hussain, Cathy Scott, Adam Zaman, and Habiban Zaman join party
- March 2026: The death of Cahal Burke (Liberal Democrats) caused a vacancy in Lindley ward

== Election result ==
Council composition after the 2024 election

Council composition after the 2026 election

2026 Kirklees Metropolitan Borough Council election
Party	Candidates	Seats	Gains	Losses	Net gain/loss	Seats %	Votes %	Votes	+/−
Reform		29	N/A	N/A	▲29	42.0	30.0	117,545	+29.5
Independent		14	N/A	N/A	▲4	20.3	10.1	39,672	–7.2
Green		12	N/A	N/A	▲8	17.4	18.3	71,973	+4.5
Conservative		9	N/A	N/A	▼7	13.0	15.1	59,061	–9.2
Liberal Democrats		5	N/A	N/A	▼5	7.3	9.8	38,513	–2.5
Labour		0	N/A	N/A	▼23	0.0	16.2	63,389	–15.0
Alliance		0	N/A	N/A	▼6	0.0	0.5	1,807	N/A
People's Alliance for Change & Equality		0	N/A	N/A	Steady	0.0	0.1	291	N/A
The Revolting Party		0	N/A	N/A	Steady	0.0	<0.1	117	N/A

== Ward results ==
=== Almondbury ===
Almondbury
Party	Candidate	Votes	%	±%
Reform	Gill Floyd	2,224	39.7	
Reform	Pip Harvey	2,135	38.1	
Reform	Craig Wiles	2,060	36.8	
Liberal Democrats	Paola Antonia Convertino Davies*	1,755	31.3	
Liberal Democrats	Jan Dobrucki	1,488	26.5	
Liberal Democrats	James Andrew Wilkinson	1,378	24.6	
Green	Stephen Paul Hampshire	1,001	17.8	
Green	Brenda Smithson	782	13.9	
Green	Peter Harvey Taylor	696	12.4	
Conservative	Grace Gift	532	9.5	
Labour	Barbara Ruth Jones	477	8.5	
Conservative	Collins Ibor	466	8.3	
Conservative	Jimmy Megbele	432	7.7	
Labour	Navraj Singh Hare	379	6.7	
Labour	Musili Yinka Oseni	331	5.9	
Turnout		5596	41.1	+10.4
Rejected ballots		10		
Registered electors		13,601		
Reform gain from Liberal Democrats		Swing		
Reform gain from Liberal Democrats		Swing		
Reform gain from Liberal Democrats		Swing		

=== Ashbrow ===
Ashbrow
Party	Candidate	Votes	%	±%
Green	Simon James Duffy	1,634	32.3	
Green	David George Edward Knight	1,464	28.9	
Green	Martin Price	1,428	28.2	
Reform	Marquis Jon Craven	1,394	27.7	
Reform	Andy Parr	1,392	27.5	
Reform	Adam Nathan James McClelland	1,377	27.2	
Labour	Zarina Yasmean Amin*	1,225	24.2	
Labour	Amanda Pinnock*	1,219	24.1	
Labour	James Richard Homewood*	1,188	23.5	
Conservative	Rob Speed	472	9.3	
Conservative	Adam Nunn	463	9.1	
Conservative	Andy Wilson	447	8.8	
People’s Alliance for Change and Equality	Mike Forster	291	5.7	
Liberal Democrats	Robert Christopher Iredale	215	4.3	
Liberal Democrats	Manjit Singh	177	3.5	
Liberal Democrats	Richard John Wilson	163	3.2	
Turnout		5,057	34.4	+5.7
Rejected ballots		23		
Registered electors		14,706		
Green gain from Labour		Swing		
Green gain from Labour		Swing		
Green gain from Labour		Swing		

=== Batley East ===
Batley East
Party	Candidate	Votes	%	±%
Independent	Akhtar Kasia	2,378	45.7	
Independent	Aziz Daji*	2,339	44.9	
Independent	Habiban Zaman*	2,209	42.4	
Green	Shameem Akhtar	856	16.4	
Reform	Richard Edwin Huddleston	827	15.9	
Reform	Gwendolyn Ann Walker	807	15.5	
Reform	Bevis Jeremy North	790	15.2	
Green	Ibrar Hussain	652	12.5	
Labour	Sheikh Rashid Wasim	646	12.4	
Labour	Fouz Ul Azeem Butt	618	11.9	
Green	Murray Purkis	564	10.8	
Labour	Haneef Moinuddin Shaik	495	9.5	
Conservative	Raymond Bray	322	6.1	
Conservative	Clive Patrick	258	5.0	
Conservative	Philip Robert Smith	242	4.6	
Liberal Democrats	Andrea Gill	222	4.3	
Liberal Democrats	Rosemary Glover Marchington	187	3.6	
Liberal Democrats	Ansar Ali Mirza	113	2.2	
Turnout		5,208	38.4	−4.5
Rejected ballots		24		
Registered electors		13,548		
Independent hold		Swing		
Independent hold		Swing		
Independent hold		Swing		

=== Batley West ===
Batley West
Party	Candidate	Votes	%	±%
Independent	Yusra Hussain*	1,725	34.0	
Independent	Zahid Kahut*	1,705	33.6	
Independent	Khuram Amjad	1,448	28.5	
Labour	Shabir Pandor	1,214	23.9	
Reform	Keith Oldroyd	1,191	23.5	
Reform	John Stead	1,134	22.3	
Reform	Christian Rooney	1,113	21.9	
Green	Khalid Amin	762	15.0	
Labour	Kimberley Sharon Thirkill	726	14.3	
Labour	Megan West	645	12.7	
Green	George Baker	602	11.9	
Green	Jack Anthony Brooker	578	11.4	
Liberal Democrats	Shujjat Ali	286	5.6	
Conservative	Drew Atkins	276	5.4	
Conservative	Sami Ul Haq Yaqoob	276	5.4	
Conservative	William Rowlands	247	4.9	
Liberal Democrats	Stuart Woodhead	199	3.9	
Liberal Democrats	Patrycja Bartosinska	130	2.6	
Community Alliance Kirklees	Senada Dervisevic	43	0.8	
Turnout		5,098	37.5	+0.2
Rejected ballots		22		
Registered electors		13,614		
Independent hold		Swing		
Independent hold		Swing		
Independent gain from Labour		Swing		

=== Birstall and Birkenshaw ===
Birstall and Birkenshaw
Party	Candidate	Votes	%	±%
Conservative	Joshua Connor Sheard*	2,559	41.9	
Conservative	Liz Smaje*	2,202	36.6	
Reform	Philip Anthony James	2,235	36.0	
Reform	Keith Mallinson	2,182	35.7	
Reform	Adrian Reid	2,001	32.7	
Conservative	Mark Stephen Thompson*	1,945	31.8	
Labour	Elaine Wilkes	639	10.5	
Green	Jamie Conor Foster	638	10.4	
Labour	Lorna Maria Goldman	621	10.2	
Labour	Cheya Amélie Watson	621	10.2	
Green	Tahir Akram	594	9.7	
Green	Corey Patrick Hayes	591	9.7	
Liberal Democrats	Louise Mary Walsh	323	5.3	
Liberal Democrats	Bernard Thomas Disken	217	3.6	
Liberal Democrats	Richard Dod	190	3.1	
Turnout		6,115	43.5	+12.8
Rejected ballots		4		
Registered electors		14,044		
Conservative hold		Swing		
Conservative hold		Swing		
Reform gain from Conservative		Swing		

=== Cleckheaton ===
Cleckheaton
Party	Candidate	Votes	%	±%
Liberal Democrats	Kathryn Mary Pinnock*	2,466	41.3	
Reform	Michael Robert Howard	2,386	40.0	
Liberal Democrats	Andrew Charles Pinnock*	2,319	38.9	
Reform	Michael Lockwood	2,312	38.8	
Reform	Richard Yeoman	2,203	36.9	
Liberal Democrats	John Craig Lawson*	2,155	36.1	
Green	Isabelle Frances Cranfield Maddox	537	9.0	
Conservative	Piers John Briggs	498	8.3	
Green	Zac Williamson	481	8.1	
Green	Mohammed Babar	446	7.5	
Labour	Erica Susan Amende	383	6.4	
Conservative	Tony Veverka	338	5.7	
Conservative	Andrew Lyndon Gray	335	5.6	
Labour	Kay Belinda Quantrill	311	5.2	
Labour	Adeel Feroz	271	4.5	
Turnout		5,975	43.3	+9.7
Rejected ballots		10		
Registered electors		13,793		
Liberal Democrats hold		Swing		
Reform gain from Liberal Democrats		Swing		
Liberal Democrats hold		Swing		

=== Colne Valley East ===
Colne Valley East
Party	Candidate	Votes	%	±%
Reform	Michael David Simmons	1,950	34.7	
Reform	Brian Moughtin	1,902	33.9	
Reform	Mark Neville Stephen Smith	1,884	33.6	
Liberal Democrats	Andrew Clive Glover Marchington	1,495	26.6	
Liberal Democrats	Nicola Jane Turner	1,296	23.1	
Liberal Democrats	David Edward Coldwell	1,266	22.6	
Green	Sharon Elaine Bond	1,099	19.6	
Green	Katie Hudson	1,085	19.3	
Green	Lewis William Craven	993	17.7	
Labour	Graham Turner	859	15.3	
Labour	Ian Charles Leedham	821	14.6	
Labour	Kali Carol Jean Mountford	764	13.6	
Conservative	Jackie Walker	328	5.8	
Conservative	Michael Pears	318	5.7	
Conservative	Moses Amoto Onubanjo	240	4.3	
Turnout		5,629	39.1	
Rejected ballots		16		
Registered electors		14,401		
Reform win (new seat)				
Reform win (new seat)				
Reform win (new seat)				

=== Colne Valley West ===
Colne Valley West
Party	Candidate	Votes	%	±%
Reform	Tracy Clayton	2,258	32.8	
Reform	Stephan Hugh Dransfield	2,233	32.4	
Reform	Dave Rowan	2,192	31.8	
Labour	Harry James McCarthy	2,164	31.4	
Labour	Matthew Paul McLoughlin	2,054	29.8	
Labour	Jayne Elizabeth Fisher	1,864	27.1	
Green	Kara Ali	1,481	21.5	
Green	Craig Grimes	1,373	19.9	
Green	Lesley Anne Warner	1,332	19.3	
Conservative	Samuel Bacon	619	9.0	
Conservative	Julia Claire Mountfield	559	8.1	
Liberal Democrats	Sue Beever	557	8.1	
Conservative	Clare Elizabeth Taylor	518	7.5	
Liberal Democrats	Harry Marchington	512	7.4	
Liberal Democrats	Jenny Victoria Turner	481	7.0	
Turnout		6,902	51.70	
Rejected ballots		16		
Registered electors		13,350		
Reform win (new seat)				
Reform win (new seat)				
Reform win (new seat)				

=== Crosland Moor ===
Crosland Moor
Party	Candidate	Votes	%	±%
Green	Imran Shahzad Safdar	2,736	53.1	
Green	Abdul Jabar	2,482	48.1	
Green	Alex Vickers	2,148	41.7	
Independent	Mohammed Abubakar	1,236	24.0	
Independent	Jo Lawson	936	18.1	
Reform	Mark Andrew Jackson	883	17.1	
Reform	Ben Thomas Kind	804	15.6	
Reform	Helen Louise Routledge	756	14.7	
Labour	Phillip Anthony Lucitt	543	10.5	
Labour	Mark Morris	513	9.9	
Labour	Morgan Read	403	7.8	
Conservative	Dale Hirst	172	3.3	
Conservative	Phillipa Reynolds	167	3.2	
Conservative	Dedami Adekomi	158	3.1	
Liberal Democrats	Sinead Grace Burke	148	2.9	
Liberal Democrats	Lucie Caitlin Long	115	2.2	
Liberal Democrats	Stevie Dungworth	95	1.8	
The Revolting Party	Jonathan Richard Tilt	53	1.0	
Turnout		5,176	39.7	
Rejected ballots		19		
Registered electors		13,038		
Green win (new seat)				
Green win (new seat)				
Green win (new seat)				

=== Dalton ===
Dalton
Party	Candidate	Votes	%	±%
Reform	Luke Fallas	1,800	38.4	
Reform	John Hardie	1,782	38.1	
Reform	Christine Smith	1,761	37.6	
Labour	Tyler Cain Hawkins*	1,355	28.9	
Labour	Munir Ahmed*	1,205	25.7	
Labour	Manisha Roma Kaushik	1,047	22.4	
Green	Clare Walters	945	20.2	
Green	Richard Heywood	877	18.7	
Green	Sa’Dia Mosaddeq	769	16.4	
Conservative	Christopher Bellamy	403	8.6	
Conservative	James Jones	358	7.6	
Liberal Democrats	Linda Andrews	317	6.8	
Conservative	Benjamin Wallace-Thompson	316	6.7	
Liberal Democrats	Angela Dobrucki	229	4.9	
Liberal Democrats	James Maw	221	4.7	
Turnout		4,693	35.5	+8.6
Rejected ballots		11		
Registered electors		13,234		
Reform gain from Labour		Swing		
Reform gain from Labour		Swing		
Reform gain from Independent		Swing		

=== Denby Dale ===
Denby Dale
Party	Candidate	Votes	%	±%
Conservative	Timothy Vincent Bamford*	3,075	45.3	
Conservative	Tina Bamford	2,401	35.4	
Reform	Simon James Brophy	1,971	29.0	
Reform	Michelle Jane Edwards	1,797	26.5	
Reform	Neil Mayman	1,598	23.5	
Conservative	Harry Wood	1,558	22.9	
Labour	Dave Devenport	1,509	22.2	
Labour	Nick Wilson	1,487	21.9	
Labour	Ruby Faye Knowles	1,104	16.3	
Green	Andy Scott	863	12.7	
Green	Steven Bradley Hookham	802	11.8	
Green	Bethany Lucienne Lockwood	780	11.5	
Liberal Democrats	James Stephen Collins	287	4.2	
Liberal Democrats	Edward Woodhead	221	3.3	
Liberal Democrats	Viv Woodhead	204	3.0	
The Revolting Party	Miri Finch	64	0.9	
Turnout		6,799	49.2	+9.9
Rejected ballots		7		
Registered electors		13,820		
Conservative hold		Swing		
Conservative gain from Labour		Swing		
Reform gain from Labour		Swing		

=== Dewsbury East ===
Dewsbury East
Party	Candidate	Votes	%	±%
Reform	Eric Stuart Butterworth	2,096	39.8	
Reform	Graham Michael France	2,022	38.4	
Reform	Maciej Kapsa	1,833	34.8	
Liberal Democrats	Ednan Hussain	1,024	19.5	
Liberal Democrats	Dennis Hullock	936	17.8	
Liberal Democrats	Jon Robert Bloom	896	17.0	
Labour	Eric Firth*	775	14.7	
Labour	Mudassar Chaudhray	649	12.3	
Independent	Logan Bramwell	638	12.1	
Community Alliance Kirklees	Cathy Scott*	574	10.9	
Green	Jack Cambridge	557	10.6	
Green	Clare Patricia Lindley	533	10.1	
Labour	Michael Richard Keddie	530	10.1	
Green	Gideon Barry Richards	393	7.5	
Community Alliance Kirklees	Karam Hussain	371	7.0	
Community Alliance Kirklees	Danielle Forsyth	365	6.9	
Conservative	Carolyn Heath	364	6.9	
Conservative	Hassan Raza	212	4.0	
Conservative	Ibiknule Farajimakin	199	3.8	
Turnout		5,288	36.4	+9.9
Rejected ballots		24		
Registered electors		14,539		
Reform gain from Labour		Swing		
Reform gain from Alliance		Swing		
Reform gain from Independent		Swing		

=== Dewsbury South ===
Dewsbury South
Party	Candidate	Votes	%	±%
Independent	Hanifa Darwan*	2,117	38.9	
Independent	Masood Ahmed*	1,873	34.4	
Reform	Christopher Kennedy	1,311	24.1	
Independent	Soyeb Yusuf	1,294	23.8	
Labour	Imtiaz Ali Ameen	1,287	23.6	
Reform	Michael Kenneth Fortune	1,242	22.8	
Reform	Ryan Ward	1,215	22.3	
Labour	Mohammed Ali	1,120	20.6	
Labour	Jackie Ramsay	983	18.0	
Independent	Ismail Yusuf Bhana	923	16.9	
Green	Mohammed Abubakar Haneef	425	7.8	
Green	Ebony Riann Johnson	329	6.0	
Green	Myste Brooke Webster	307	5.6	
Conservative	Pamela Joyce Thorne	226	4.1	
Conservative	Marjorie Wheelhouse	215	3.9	
Conservative	Claire Voyce	204	3.7	
Independent	Shaun Maddox	201	3.7	
Liberal Democrats	Stephen John Bird	156	2.9	
Liberal Democrats	Chrissy Bloom	138	2.5	
Liberal Democrats	John Edward Rossington	100	1.8	
Turnout		5,484	42.0	+0.7
Rejected ballots		36		
Registered electors		13,047		
Independent hold		Swing		
Independent hold		Swing		
Reform gain from Labour		Swing		

=== Dewsbury West ===
Dewsbury West
Party	Candidate	Votes	%	±%
Independent	Tanisha Bramwell*	2,563	41.8	
Independent	Ammar Anwar*	2,188	35.7	
Independent	Khalid Patel	2,041	33.3	
Labour	Mussarat Shaheen Pervaiz	1,756	28.6	
Labour	Ateeque Ur Rehman Saddique	1,751	28.6	
Labour	Basharat Mahmood Rafiq	1,642	26.8	
Liberal Democrats	Tariq Khan	966	15.8	
Liberal Democrats	Waheed Anwar	839	13.7	
Liberal Democrats	Irslan Ishtiaq	757	12.3	
Reform	Dawn Jeannette Armstrong	636	10.4	
Reform	Susan Dolman	606	9.9	
Reform	Lesley Ann Turner	559	9.1	
Green	Simon John Cope	427	7.0	
Green	Edward Christopher Sampson	306	5.0	
Green	Jonathan George Tolan	254	4.1	
Conservative	Nicholas Bowett	140	2.3	
Conservative	Maureen Nancy Sykes	135	2.2	
Conservative	John Cowan	136	2.2	
Turnout		6,161	45.5	+4.6
Rejected ballots		31		
Registered electors		13,538		
Independent hold		Swing		
Independent hold		Swing		
Independent gain from Labour		Swing		

=== Greenhead ===
Greenhead
Party	Candidate	Votes	%	±%
Green	Maryam Jawaid	2,633	43.9	
Green	Richard Andrew John Burton	2,606	43.4	
Green	Toby Michael Cooper	2,470	41.2	
Labour	Mohan Singh Sokhal*	1,371	22.9	
Labour	Carole Ann Pattison*	1,353	22.6	
Labour	Sheikh Noor Ullah*	1,251	20.9	
Reform	John Kenneth Dolby	996	16.6	
Reform	Graham Haigh	986	16.4	
Reform	Paul Brian Wood	941	15.7	
Conservative	Trevor Bellamy	393	6.6	
Liberal Democrats	Margaret Fearnley	359	6.0	
Conservative	Eileen Marchant	355	5.9	
Liberal Democrats	Susan Robinson	319	5.3	
Community Alliance Kirklees	Majeeda Bibi	318	5.3	
Liberal Democrats	Robert James Hargreaves	307	5.1	
Conservative	John Travis	304	5.1	
Community Alliance Kirklees	Rebecca Kane	179	3.0	
Turnout		6,020	38.5	▲1.2
Rejected ballots		21		
Registered electors		15,625		
Green gain from Labour		Swing		
Green gain from Labour		Swing		
Green gain from Labour		Swing		

=== Heckmondwike ===
Heckmondwike
Party	Candidate	Votes	%	±%
Reform	Simon Holbrook	1,892	34.9	
Reform	Glennis-Anne Harrison	1,890	34.9	
Reform	Lee Konrad Cliff	1,838	33.9	
Labour	Aafaq Butt*	1,456	26.9	
Independent	Muhammad Anwar Zahid	1,161	21.4	
Independent	Ali Arshad*	1,157	21.4	
Independent	Naeem Latif	1,096	20.2	
Labour	Viv Kendrick*	1,001	18.5	
Labour	Simon Phillip Thirkill	810	14.9	
Green	Liz King	527	9.7	
Conservative	Lyndsey Hall	491	9.1	
Green	Amy Loughenbury	404	7.5	
Independent	Clare Naughton	362	6.7	
Green	Benjamin Michael Wainman	349	6.4	
Conservative	Joanne Wallace-Thompson	320	5.9	
Conservative	John Sykes	317	5.8	
Liberal Democrats	Gill Long	174	3.2	
Liberal Democrats	Josie Pugsley	169	3.1	
Liberal Democrats	Stephen James Long	144	2.7	
Turnout		5,445	33.3	+1.8
Rejected ballots		26		
Registered electors		13,183		
Reform gain from Independent		Swing		
Reform gain from Labour		Swing		
Reform gain from Labour		Swing		

=== Holme Valley North ===
Holme Valley North
Party	Candidate	Votes	%	±%
Independent	Charles Roger Greaves*	3,040	44.2	
Independent	Richard Jordan Noon	2,356	34.2	
Independent	Julia Faye Roebuck	2,063	30.0	
Reform	Joseph Martin Lodge	1,791	26.0	
Reform	Lee Campion	1,654	24.0	
Reform	Michael Holdsworth	1,625	23.6	
Conservative	Donna Katherine Bellamy*	1,338	19.4	
Green	Alex Green	973	14.1	
Conservative	David Michael Heathcote	902	13.1	
Conservative	Andrew John Smith	771	11.2	
Green	Chris Green	699	10.2	
Green	Martin Peter Forrester	676	9.8	
Labour	Alison Meda Morgan	567	8.2	
Labour	Lorraine Needham-Reid	521	7.6	
Labour	Sally Grace Pinnell	484	7.0	
Liberal Democrats	Roger Bradley	198	2.9	
Liberal Democrats	David John Woodhead	193	2.8	
Liberal Democrats	Howard Leslie Cohen	159	2.3	
Turnout		6,890	50.3	+9.8
Rejected ballots		9		
Registered electors		13,702		
Independent hold		Swing		
Independent gain from Conservative		Swing		
Independent gain from Conservative		Swing		

=== Holme Valley South ===
Holme Valley South
Party	Candidate	Votes	%	±%
Reform	David George Birch	2,297	28.4	
Conservative	Damian Craig Brook	2,259	27.9	
Reform	Robert Francis Butler	2,222	27.5	
Reform	Janet Saville	2,104	26.0	
Labour	Moses Crook*	1,937	23.9	
Conservative	Jo Liles	1,867	23.1	
Conservative	Harry Lewis James Davis	1,839	22.7	
Labour	Jayne Elizabeth Rylah*	1,830	22.6	
Labour	Doris Mary Blacka	1,819	22.5	
Green	Anja Jayne Louise Etty	1,702	21.0	
Green	Jim Lister	1,407	17.4	
Green	Steven Hall	1,368	16.9	
Liberal Democrats	Ellen Griffiths	365	4.5	
Liberal Democrats	Christine Mary Iredale	309	3.8	
Liberal Democrats	Nicholas David Shaw	274	3.4	
Turnout		8,112	52.9	+10.5
Rejected ballots		19		
Registered electors		15,321		
Reform gain from Labour		Swing		
Conservative gain from Labour		Swing		
Reform gain from Labour		Swing		

=== Kirkburton ===
Kirkburton
Party	Candidate	Votes	%	±%
Conservative	John Joseph Taylor*	2,637	42.2	
Conservative	Bill Armer*	2,227	35.6	
Conservative	Richard Smith*	2,071	33.1	
Reform	Bill Hodgson	1,939	31.0	
Reform	Graham Pickup	1,837	29.4	
Reform	Christopher David Wisher	1,707	27.3	
Green	Jane Bodhi	1,403	22.5	
Green	Graham Simpson	1,027	16.4	
Green	Rosamund Ann Walsh	952	15.2	
Labour	Edward John Bowen	793	12.7	
Labour	Raffi Leece	472	7.6	
Labour	Alero Megbele	383	6.1	
Liberal Democrats	Jane Elizabeth Lambert	228	3.6	
Liberal Democrats	Miles Crompton	192	3.1	
Liberal Democrats	Jeremy Smith	151	2.4	
Turnout		6,259	48.9	+12.0
Rejected ballots		11		
Registered electors		12,788		
Conservative hold		Swing		
Conservative hold		Swing		
Conservative hold		Swing		

=== Lindley ===
Lindley
Party	Candidate	Votes	%	±%
Liberal Democrats	Ashleigh Victoria Robinson*	2,097	32.1	
Liberal Democrats	Anthony John Smith*	1,995	30.5	
Liberal Democrats	David Ridgway	1,895	29.0	
Reform	Stephen Anthony Bottomley	1,864	28.5	
Reform	Stuart Michael Hale	1,735	26.5	
Reform	Damien Eyre	1,704	26.1	
Conservative	Robert William Anthony McGuin	1,082	16.5	
Conservative	Alistair Coldwell	973	14.9	
Green	Chloe Nicole Jackson	954	14.6	
Conservative	Jack Maximilian Edwards	903	13.8	
Green	Tony Ryland	795	12.2	
Green	Adam James Stroyan	779	11.9	
Labour	Harpreet Kaur	640	9.8	
Labour	Annette Marie McLoughlin	597	9.1	
Labour	James Meade	519	7.9	
Independent	Andy Wood	397	6.1	
Turnout		6,545	43.30	
Rejected ballots		5		
Registered electors		14,663		
Liberal Democrats hold		Swing		
Liberal Democrats hold		Swing		
Liberal Democrats hold		Swing		

=== Liversedge and Gomersal ===
Liversedge and Gomersal
Party	Candidate	Votes	%	±%
Reform	Jane Barraclough	2,490	43.3	
Reform	Sarah Louise Wood	2,340	40.7	
Reform	Susan Jeanette Maxfield	2,330	40.5	
Conservative	David James Hall*	1,641	28.5	
Conservative	Caroline Jane Holt*	1,629	28.3	
Conservative	Matt Clarke	1,564	27.2	
Labour	George Mason Hall	702	12.2	
Green	Maya Elizabeth Friend	672	11.7	
Labour	Hazel Anne Seidel	636	11.1	
Green	Daniel Francis Michael Friend	620	10.8	
Green	Nicholas Eugene Whittingham	563	9.8	
Labour	Ralph Wright	547	9.5	
Liberal Democrats	Andrew Malcolm McCaig	231	4.0	
Independent	Tracey Louise King	209	3.6	
Liberal Democrats	David Peter Snee	201	3.5	
Liberal Democrats	Chris Williams	188	3.3	
Turnout		5,760	40.2	+11.0
Rejected ballots		12		
Registered electors		14,323		
Reform gain from Conservative		Swing		
Reform gain from Conservative		Swing		
Reform gain from Conservative		Swing		

=== Mirfield ===
Mirfield
Party	Candidate	Votes	%	±%
Conservative	Martyn Bolt*	2,974	40.8	
Reform	Matthew Maude	2,640	36.2	
Reform	James Steven O’Leary	2,510	34.5	
Reform	Carl Richard Pickering	2,495	34.3	
Conservative	Vivien Lees-Hamilton*	2,319	31.8	
Conservative	Mark Hamilton	1,971	27.1	
Green	Catherine Helen Whittingham	1,163	16.0	
Green	Richard Mark Dewhirst	985	13.5	
Labour	James Howard Fishwick	952	13.1	
Green	Debby Plummer	832	11.4	
Labour	Jessica Rose May White	759	10.4	
Labour	Shanta Pinnock	709	9.7	
Liberal Democrats	Claire Louise Scargill	312	4.3	
Liberal Democrats	Thomas Charles Waterhouse	212	2.9	
Liberal Democrats	Andrew Hartley Wilkinson	211	2.9	
Turnout		7,298	45.7	+10.7
Rejected ballots		15		
Registered electors		15,958		
Conservative hold		Swing		
Reform gain from Conservative		Swing		
Reform gain from Conservative		Swing		

=== Netherton and Newsome ===
Netherton and Newsome
Party	Candidate	Votes	%	±%
Green	Andrew Varah Cooper	2,703	52.8	
Green	Karen Louise Allison	2,645	51.6	
Green	Susan Jane Lee-Richards	2,464	48.1	
Reform	David Anderson	1,671	32.6	
Reform	Peter Bell	1,633	31.9	
Reform	Robert Paul Hargreaves	1,560	30.4	
Labour	Shahana Adeeb	376	7.4	
Labour	Faith Akume	358	7.0	
Labour	William James Dennis	352	6.9	
Conservative	Kath Bellamy	215	4.2	
Conservative	Ian Andrew Roberts	185	3.6	
Conservative	Jane Dickinson	183	3.6	
Liberal Democrats	Clare Elizabeth Marianthe Wright	140	2.7	
Liberal Democrats	Vincent Wadsworth	137	2.7	
Liberal Democrats	Artwell Kamanga	114	2.2	
Turnout		5,129	38.7	
Rejected ballots		5		
Registered electors		13,265		
Green win (new seat)				
Green win (new seat)				
Green win (new seat)				

== Post-election changes ==
=== Almondbury ===
Almondbury by-election: 13 August 2026 Resignation of Craig Wiles (Reform) due to health issues
Party	Candidate	Votes	%	±%
Liberal Democrats	Paola Davies	1,749	43.9	+14.6
Reform	Graham Haigh	1,078	27.0	−10.1
Conservative	Robert McGuin	528	13.2	+4.3
Green	Sa'Dia Mossadeq	347	8.7	−8.0
Labour	Navraj Hare	181	4.5	−3.5
Independent	Marquis Craven	103	2.6	N/A
Majority		671	16.8	N/A
Turnout		3,994	29.5	−11.6
Registered electors		13,538		
Liberal Democrats gain from Reform		Swing	▲12.4	

The winning candidate, Paola Davies (Liberal Democrats) had previously been a councillor for Almondbury ward from 2023-2026.
