= Paul Salveson =

English politician, activist and author

Councillor Paul Salveson

Councillor, Kirklees Council
- In office May 2012 – October 2013
- Preceded by: Hilary Richards
- Succeeded by: Christine Iredale
- Constituency: Golcar
- Majority: 145 (3.3%)

Personal details
- Party: Yorkshire Party
- Other political affiliations: Labour Party (until 2014)
- Education: University of Salford
- Profession: Visiting professor at University of Bolton and University of Huddersfield; General Secretary at Hannah Mitchell Foundation
- Website: www.paulsalveson.org.uk

Paul Salveson, MBE FCILT, is an English politician, activist and author. He is currently a visiting professor in transport and logistics at the University of Bolton and University of Huddersfield.

== Education ==
Salveson did an undergraduate degree at the University of Lancaster. His PhD is from University of Salford - 'Region Class, Culture: Lancashire Dialect Literatur 1746-1935' awarded in 1993.

== Professional career ==
Salveson began his career at the Horwich Works. From 2004 until 2010 he served as Head of Government and Community Strategies at Northern Rail. From 2015 until 2018, he served as group advisor, community rail at Arriva UK Trains.

He was a member of the Transport Focus board, and was a trustee of Campaign for Better Transport. In 2009, he received an MBE for services to the railway industry. He is currently a visiting professor in transport and logistics at the University of Huddersfield.

Salveson is the honorary patron of the Railway Employees' Passenger Transport Association and is a Fellow of the Chartered Institute of Logistics and Transport.

== Political career ==
Salveson was elected to Kirklees Council in 2012 for the Labour Party, and he represented the Golcar ward until 2013, when he stepped down. He said after stepping down: "In an ideal world I’d be able to do both my council work and continue my interests in the national Transport Focus board, but in reality if you want to do one well, and to maximum effect, one has got to give.". Salveson was formerly the vice-chair of the Colne Valley Constituency Labour Party.

In late 2014, he joined the Yorkshire Party, saying the "vitality in Scotland confirmed that it was the right choice to make". In 2015, he stood as the party's parliamentary candidate in Colne Valley.

In 2011, Salveson published Socialism with a Northern Accent, described by former Deputy Prime Minister John Prescott as "an important account of Labour's traditional, community-based values with many lessons for today". The book makes the case for the renewal of popular socialism through devolution to the North of England.

Salveson has written twice for The Guardian, both on devolution for Yorkshire. He has also proposed for the re-integration of the Lancashire and Yorkshire Railway services, to follow the successful example of the integrated regional services in Germany and Switzerland. Salveson has expressed his conviction that continuous growth in the railway industry is required, in order to stimulate demand and encourage more people to use the services. In the 2000s, Salveson had a column in industry publication Rail.

Salveson is currently Secretary General of the Hannah Mitchell Foundation. he also writes for Chartist magazine, Big Issue North and other publications. In August 2016, he moved from Yorkshire back to Lancashire but now lives in Kents Bank.

== Books ==
- Railpolitik: Bringing Railways Back to the Community (Lawrence & Wishart, London: 2013)
- Socialism with a Northern Accent (Lawrence & Wishart, London: 2012)
- Northern Rail Heritage (Little Northern Books, Yorkshire: 2008)
- With Walt Whitman in Bolton: spirituality, sex and socialism in a Northern Mill Town (Little Northern Books, published 2008, republished 2016)
