= Independent Commission on Civil Aviation Noise =

UK government organisation for aircraft noise pollution (2018–2021)

- Logo of the Independent Commission on Civil Aviation Noise

Agency overview
- Formed: November 2018
- Dissolved: September 2021
- Type: Advisory non-departmental public body
- Jurisdiction: Great Britain
- Headquarters: Albion House, Woking, Surrey, GU21 6BG
- Motto: ICCAN is the Independent Commission on Civil Aviation Noise
- Employees: 14 (and five commissioners)
- Annual budget: £1.75 million (2020/21)
- Minister responsible: Secretary of State for Transport
- Agency executive: Head Commissioner
- Parent department: Department for Transport
- Website: iccan.gov.uk

Map
- Great Britain in the UK and Europe

The Independent Commission on Civil Aviation Noise (ICCAN) was an advisory non-departmental public body of the Government of the United Kingdom with responsibility for civil aviation noise, and how it affects communities.

The stated objectives of the commission were to "increase trust, transparency and clarity in the aviation noise debate", to "promote consistency, responsibility and accountability within the industry and beyond", and to establish its authority and credibility as a body. It was dissolved in September 2021.

== History ==
ICCAN was formed in November 2018, in order to act as an impartial and independent voice on aviation noise and how it affects communities. Robert Light was appointed as its Head Commissioner on 19 November 2018, and a further four commissioners were then appointed. Sam Hartley became the Secretary to the commission on 7 January 2019, previously serving as the Deputy Director of Devolution Strategy for the Cabinet Office and Secretary to the Boundary Commission for England.

== Structure ==
ICCAN consisted of five commissioners, headed by a Head Commissioner, and supported by a secretariat. ICCAN was based in Woking, Surrey.

=== Commissioners ===
As of its dissolution, ICCAN had five commissioners, headed by Robert Light:

Name	Responsibility
Robert Light	ICCAN Head Commissioner
Simon Henley MBE	ICCAN Commissioner
Colin Noble	ICCAN Commissioner
Howard Simmons	ICCAN Commissioner
Simon Kahn	ICCAN Commissioner

== Responsibilities ==
ICCAN followed a programme of activity based on the Department for Transport's "2017 Airspace Policy Consultation Response". ICCAN's job was to make recommendations to the Government's approach to how aviation noise could be managed, and how its reporting and management of aviation noise could be made more open and transparent. The Government said it would decide in 2021 whether or not ICCAN should be granted more authority. Instead it opted to dissolve ICCAN in September 2021. This was because politicians, civil servants and its own leaders never agreed what it was for.
