= Kath Pinnock, Baroness Pinnock =

British politician (born 1946)

The Right Honourable The Baroness Pinnock
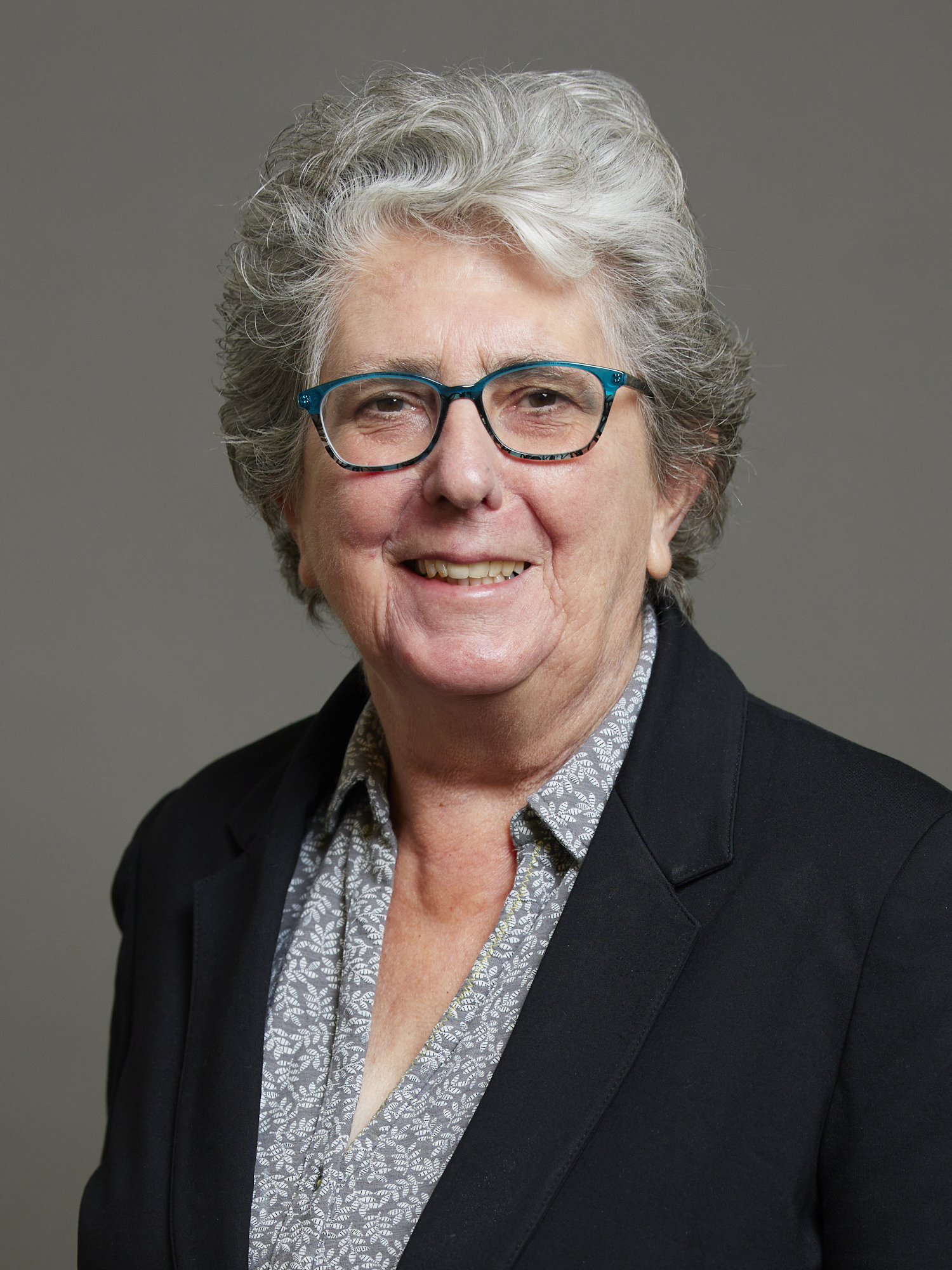
- Official portrait, 2022

Member of the House of Lords
- Lord Temporal
- Life peerage 23 September 2014

Leader of Kirklees Council
- In office 2000–2006
- Succeeded by: Robert Light

Councillor of Kirklees Council from Cleckheaton Ward
- Incumbent
- Assumed office May 7, 1987

Personal details
- Born: Kathryn Mary Pinnock; 25 September 1946 (age 80)
- Citizenship: United Kingdom
- Party: Liberal Democrats
- Education: Keele University

Kathryn Mary Pinnock, Baroness Pinnock (born 25 September 1946) is a British Liberal Democrat politician, life peer, and former school teacher. Since 1987, she has been a member of Kirklees Metropolitan Borough Council. She was leader of the council's Lib Dem group from 1991 to 2014, and leader of the council from 2000 to 2006. She was created a life peer in 2014 and now sits in the House of Lords.

She has been deputy leader of the Liberal Democrats in the House of Lords since October 2024.

== Early life ==
Pinnock was born on 25 September 1946. She attended the girls' grammar school, the City of Bath Girls' School (now the Hayesfield Girls' School).

She studied history and chemistry at Keele University, graduating with a bachelor's degree. She remained at Keele to complete a teaching diploma.

== Early career ==
Following university, Pinnock became a secondary school teacher. She taught history in schools in Birmingham and Special Needs Maths at Rastrick High School in West Yorkshire. She also served as Deputy Chief Examiner for A-Level History for a number of years.

== Political career ==
=== Local government ===
Since 1987, she has been a local councillor, representing Cleckheaton on the Kirklees Council. She was leader of the Lib Dem group on the council between 1991 and 2014. She was leader of the council from 2000 to 2006, and was the first female to hold this post.

=== House of Lords ===
In August 2014, it was announced that she was to be made a life peer. She was created a life peer on 23 September 2014 taking the title Baroness Pinnock, of Cleckheaton in the County of West Yorkshire. Since June 2015, she has been a member of the Home Affairs Sub-Committee of the European Union Committee.

In 2015, Pinnock was appointed the Spokesperson for Children for the Lib Dems, and in October 2016 she was appointed their Shadow Secretary of State for Communities and Local Government.

== Honours ==
In July 2015, Pinnock was awarded an honorary doctorate by the University of Huddersfield.
