= Socialism with a Northern Accent =

2011 book by Paul Salveson

Socialism with a Northern Accent: Radical Traditions for Modern Times
- Author: Paul Salveson
- Language: English
- Subject: Socialism
- Publisher: Lawrence & Wishart
- Publication date: 2011
- Publication place: England
- Media type: Print
- Pages: 224
- ISBN: 978-1907103391

Socialism with a Northern Accent: Radical Traditions for Modern Times is a book by Paul Salveson, at that time a Labour Party and trade union activist, which re-asserts the strength and distinctiveness of the socialism which emerged in the mills, mines and railway yards of the North of England. It also makes the case for the renewal of popular socialism through devolution to the North of England.

The book was originally published with a foreword by John Prescott, who described it as "an important account of Labour’s traditional, community-based values with many lessons for today".
