= 2016 Kirklees Metropolitan Borough Council election =

2016 local election in England

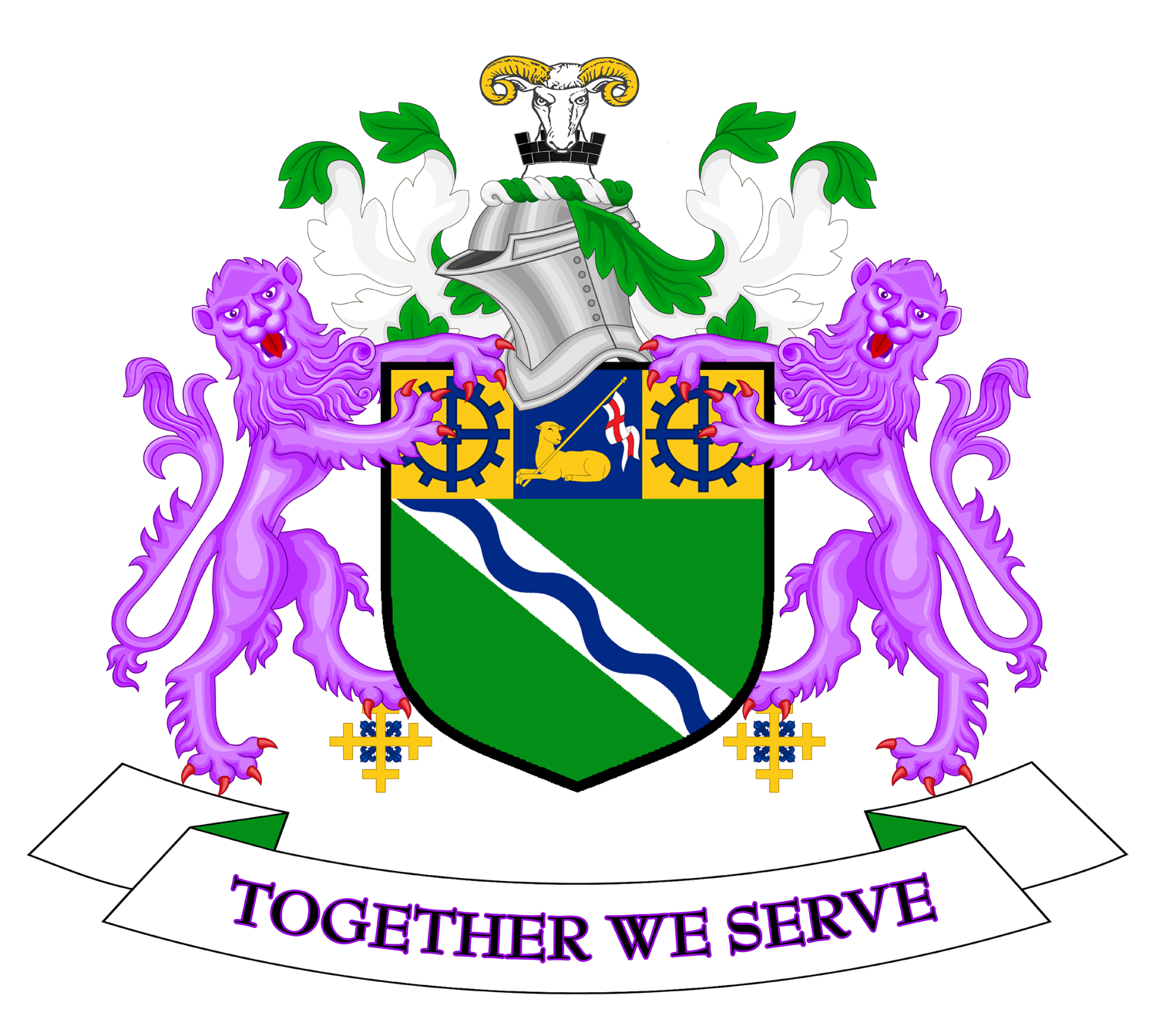
- May 5, 2016

23 of the 69 seats on Kirklees Metropolitan Borough Council 35 seats needed for a majority
- Turnout: 35%

	First party	Second party	Third party
Leader	David Sheard	David Hall	Nicola Turner
Party	Labour	Conservative	Liberal Democrats
Leader's seat	Heckmondwike	Liversedge and Gomersal	Colne Valley
Seats after	34	20	9
Seat change	Steady	▲2	▼1
Popular vote	43,398	28,526	14,460
Percentage	39.8%	26.2%	13.3%
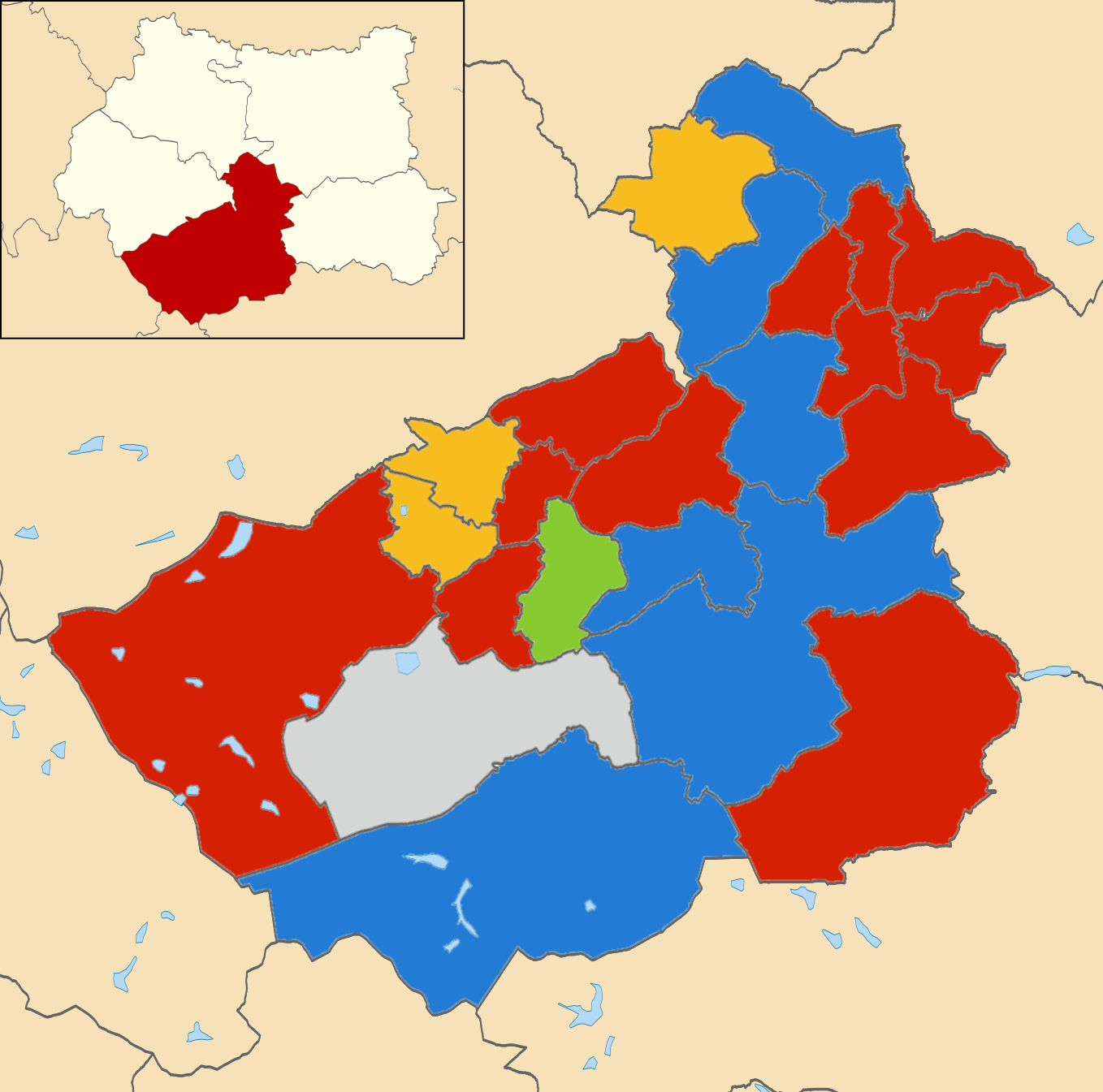
- 2016 local election results in Kirklees
Council control before election before election
David Sheard
No overall control
Subsequent council control
David Sheard
No overall control

The 2016 Kirklees Metropolitan Borough Council election took place on 5 May 2016 to elect members of Kirklees Metropolitan Borough Council in West Yorkshire, England. This was on the same day as other 2016 United Kingdom local elections.

== Ward results ==
=== Almondbury ward ===
Almondbury
Party	Candidate	Votes	%	±%
Conservative	Bernard McGuin	1,328	27.22	
Liberal Democrats	Phil Scott	1,268	25.99	
Labour	Ken Lowe	1,259	25.80	
UKIP	Joshua Pearce	525	10.76	
Green	Derek Hardcastle	464	9.51	
TUSC	Aaron Bailey	35	0.72	
Majority		60	1.23	
Turnout		4,879	36	
Conservative gain from Liberal Democrats		Swing		

=== Ashbrow ward ===
Ashbrow
Party	Candidate	Votes	%	±%
Labour	James Homewood	2,307	58.32	
Conservative	Homma Abid	1,024	25.88	
Green	Joan Smithson	475	12.01	
Liberal Democrats	Mohammed Ramzan	150	3.79	
Majority		1,283	32.43	
Turnout		3,956	29	
Labour hold		Swing		

=== Batley East ward ===
Batley East
Party	Candidate	Votes	%	±%
Labour	Fazila Fadia	3,487	69.78	
Conservative	Derrick Yates	594	11.89	
Independent	Abdul Ghaffar	512	10.25	
Liberal Democrats	Richard Farnhill	248	4.96	
Green	Char Stoyles	156	3.12	
Majority		2,893	57.89	
Turnout		4,997	40	
Labour hold		Swing		

=== Batley West ward ===
Batley West
Party	Candidate	Votes	%	±%
Labour Co-op	Shabir Pandor	2,833	62.50	
UKIP	James Griffith-Jones	698	15.40	
Conservative	Lyndsey Hall	648	14.30	
Green	Garry Kitchin	198	4.37	
Liberal Democrats	Christopher Kane	156	3.44	
Majority		2,135	47.10	
Turnout		4,533	35	
Labour hold		Swing		

=== Birstall and Birkenshaw ward ===
Birstall and Birkenshaw
Party	Candidate	Votes	%	±%
Conservative	Andrew Palfreeman	1,987	47.32	
Labour	Khalid Patel	939	22.36	
UKIP	Joyce Holbrook	851	20.27	
Liberal Democrats	Clare Kane	232	5.53	
Green	Jasmine Kennedy	190	4.52	
Majority		1,048	24.96	
Turnout		4,199	34	
Conservative hold		Swing		

=== Cleckheaton ward ===
Cleckheaton
Party	Candidate	Votes	%	±%
Liberal Democrats	Kath Pinnock	2,592	55.61	
UKIP	Colin Walshaw	707	15.17	
Conservative	Andrew Gray	677	14.52	
Labour	Aafaq Butt	571	12.25	
Green	Catherine Whittingham	114	2.45	
Majority		1,885	40.44	
Turnout		4,661	36	
Liberal Democrats hold		Swing		

=== Colne Valley ward ===
Colne Valley
Party	Candidate	Votes	%	±%
Labour	Rob Walker	1,624	32.42	
Liberal Democrats	David Ridgway	1,558	31.10	
Conservative	Mathew Noble	902	18.01	
UKIP	Melanie Roberts	579	11.56	
Green	Liz Byrd	346	6.91	
Majority		66	1.32	
Turnout		5,009		
Labour gain from Liberal Democrats		Swing		

=== Crosland Moor and Netherton ward ===
Crosland Moor and Netherton
Party	Candidate	Votes	%	±%
Labour	Manisha Kaushik	2,582	53.24	
Conservative	Robert Young	888	18.31	
UKIP	Paul George	486	10.02	
Green	Chas Ball	367	7.57	
Liberal Democrats	Robert Iredale	278	5.73	
Independent	Steve Bradbury	137	2.82	
TUSC	Jason Bowen	112	2.31	
Majority		1,694	34.93	
Turnout		4,850	38	
Labour hold		Swing		

=== Dalton ward ===
Dalton
Party	Candidate	Votes	%	±%
Labour	Naheed Mather	1,537	43.52	
UKIP	Tom Wise	688	19.48	
Conservative	Maria Ackroyd	578	16.36	
Liberal Democrats	Roger Battye	548	15.52	
Green	Simon Duffy	181	5.12	
Majority		849	24.04	
Turnout		3,532	29	
Labour hold		Swing		

=== Denby Dale ward ===
Denby Dale
Party	Candidate	Votes	%	±%
Labour	Graham Turner	2,631	48.41	
Conservative	Paula Kemp	2,484	45.70	
Liberal Democrats	Andrew Wilkinson	320	5.89	
Majority		147	2.70	
Turnout		5,435	43	
Labour hold		Swing		

=== Dewsbury East ward ===
Dewsbury East
Party	Candidate	Votes	%	±%
Labour	Paul Kane	2,285	52.95	
Conservative	Mark Eastwood	970	22.48	
UKIP	Greg Burrows	758	17.57	
Liberal Democrats	Dennis Hullock	191	4.43	
Green	Tony Kelsall	111	2.57	
Majority		1,315	30.48	
Turnout		4,315	33	
Labour hold		Swing		

=== Dewsbury South ward ===
Dewsbury South
Party	Candidate	Votes	%	±%
Labour	Gulfam Asif	2,626	54	
Conservative	Imtiaz Ameen	1,406	29	
Green	Adrian Cruden	525	11	
Liberal Democrats	Bernard Disken	339	7	
Majority				
Turnout		4,896	38	
Labour hold		Swing		

=== Dewsbury West ward ===
Dewsbury West
Party	Candidate	Votes	%	±%
Labour	Mussarat Pervaiz	3,164	62	
Liberal Democrats	Shehzad Hussain	992	20	
Conservative	John Nottingham	474	9	
Green	Simon Cope	450	9	
Majority				
Turnout		5,080	40	
Labour hold		Swing		

=== Golcar ward ===
Golcar
Party	Candidate	Votes	%	±%
Liberal Democrats	Christine Iredale	1,726	38	
Labour	Stephen Jungnitz	1,495	33	
UKIP	Susan Laird	670	15	
Conservative	Robert Daniel	443	10	
Green	Daniel Greenwood	217	5	
Majority				
Turnout		4,551	34	
Liberal Democrats gain from Labour		Swing		

=== Greenhead ward ===
Greenhead
Party	Candidate	Votes	%	±%
Labour	Sheikh Ullah	3,024	63	
Conservative	Anthony McGuin	780	16	
Green	John Phillips	545	11	
Liberal Democrats	Manjit Singh	344	7	
TUSC	David Waight	140	3	
Majority				
Turnout		4,833	37	
Labour hold		Swing		

=== Heckmondwike ward ===
Heckmondwike
Party	Candidate	Votes	%	±%
Labour	Steve Hall	2,281	56	
UKIP	Aleks Lukic	836	20	
Conservative	Robert Thornton	701	17	
Green	Sofia Layton	142	3	
Liberal Democrats	Josie Pugsley	119	3	
Majority				
Turnout		4,079	31	
Labour hold		Swing		

=== Holme Valley North ward ===
Holme Valley North
Party	Candidate	Votes	%	±%
Independent	Charles Greaves	2,142	44	
Conservative	Trevor Bellamy	994	20	
Labour	Keiron Dunn	899	18	
UKIP	Joshua Dalton	574	12	
Liberal Democrats	Kingsley Hill	289	6	
Majority				
Turnout		4,898	38	
Independent hold		Swing		

=== Holme Valley South ward ===
Holme Valley South
Party	Candidate	Votes	%	±%
Conservative	Donald Firth	2,381	43	
Labour	Thelma Walker	1,680	30	
UKIP	Alan Schofield	650	12	
Green	Sue Macklin	451	8	
Liberal Democrats	Arthur Pritchard	381	7	
Majority				
Turnout		5,543	38	
Conservative hold		Swing		

=== Kirkburton ward ===
Kirkburton
Party	Candidate	Votes	%	±%
Conservative	James Smith	1,867	39	
Green	Robert Barraclough	1,731	36	
Labour	Sarah Cook	634	13	
UKIP	Jon Hudson	501	10	
Liberal Democrats	Alison Munro	107	2	
Majority				
Turnout		4,840	41	
Conservative gain from Green		Swing		

=== Lindley ward ===
Lindley
Party	Candidate	Votes	%	±%
Liberal Democrats	Richard Eastwood	2,137	40	
Conservative	Mark Hemingway	1,851	34	
Labour	Mohammed Fayoom	1,051	20	
Green	Richard Rathod	221	4	
TUSC	Cormac Kelly	117	2	
Majority				
Turnout		5,377	37	
Liberal Democrats gain from Conservative		Swing		

=== Liversedge and Gomersal ward ===
Liversedge and Gomersal
Party	Candidate	Votes	%	±%
Conservative	Michelle Grainger-Mead	1,803	40	
Labour	Mohammed Khan	1,243	27	
UKIP	Simon Holbrook	1,151	25	
Liberal Democrats	David Snee	200	4	
Green	Nicholas Whittingham	148	3	
Majority				
Turnout		4,545	32	
Conservative hold		Swing		

=== Mirfield ward ===
Mirfield
Party	Candidate	Votes	%	±%
Conservative	Stephen Bolt	3,434	64	
Labour	Karen Rowling	1,442	27	
Green	Isabel Walters	358	7	
Liberal Democrats	John Dobson	172	3	
Majority				
Turnout		5,406	37	
Conservative hold		Swing		

=== Newsome ward ===
Newsome
Party	Candidate	Votes	%	±%
Green	Andrew Cooper	2,428	52	
Labour	Nadeem Iqbal	1,822	39	
Conservative	Pauline McGleenan	312	7	
Liberal Democrats	Stephen Bird	113	2	
Majority				
Turnout		4,675	39	
Green hold		Swing		
