= Kirklees Council =

English local authority

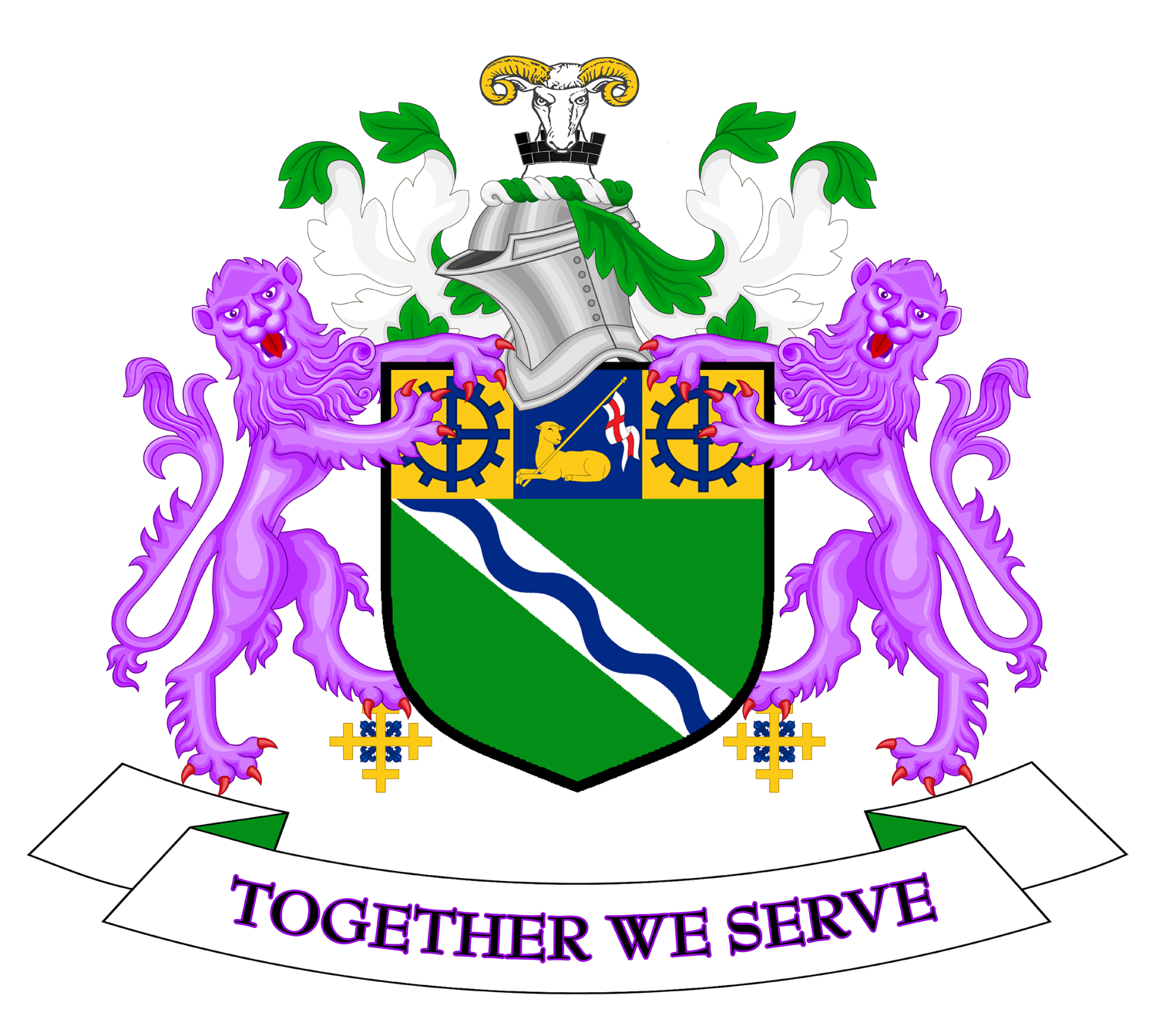
- Coat of arms

Type
- Type: Metropolitan borough

History
- Founded: 1 April 1974

Leadership
- Mayor: Karen Allison, Green since 20 May 2026
- Leader: Sarah Wood, Reform since 15 July 2026
- Chief Executive: Steve Mawson since 2023

Structure
- Seats: 69 councillors
- Graph of the party split among 69 seats.
- Political groups: Administration (26) Reform (26) Other parties (43) Green (12) Conservative (9) Liberal Democrats (6) Independent (16)
- Joint committees: West Yorkshire Combined Authority

Elections
- Voting system: Multiple member first-past-the-post
- Last election: 7 May 2026
- Next election: 6 May 2027

Meeting place
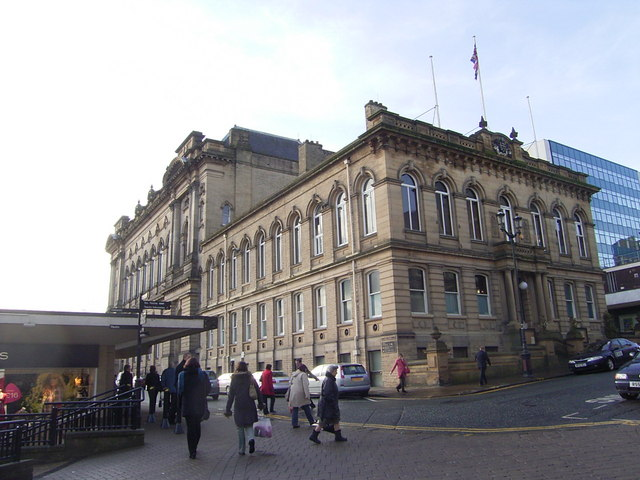
- Town Hall, Ramsden Street, Huddersfield, HD1 2TA

Website
- www.kirklees.gov.uk

Constitution
- Constitution

Kirklees Council, also known as Kirklees Metropolitan Borough Council, is the local authority for the metropolitan borough of Kirklees in West Yorkshire, England. As a metropolitan borough council it provides the majority of local government services in the borough. Since 2014 the council has been a constituent member of the West Yorkshire Combined Authority.

The council has been under no overall control since 2024. At the 2026 election, Reform UK became the largest party and subsequently formed a minority administration. The council meets at Huddersfield Town Hall and has its main offices in the nearby Civic Centre.

== History ==
Kirklees Council was established on 1 April 1974, when Kirklees and West Yorkshire were created under the Local Government Act 1972. The eleven former district councils within the area were abolished at the same time. Kirklees was awarded borough status, allowing the chair of the council to take the title of mayor.

The council was originally a district-level authority in a two-tier local government structure, alongside West Yorkshire County Council providing county-level services. However, the metropolitan county councils, including West Yorkshire County Council, were abolished in 1986 under the Local Government Act 1985. Since 1986 Kirklees Council has therefore been responsible for most local government functions in the borough.

Policing, fire services and public transport continued to be run on a county-wide basis by councillors from all five West Yorkshire boroughs. In 2012 responsibility for policing was transferred to the directly-elected West Yorkshire Police and Crime Commissioner, and then to the Mayor of West Yorkshire in 2021.

The council has been a constituent member of the West Yorkshire Combined Authority since 2014. The members of Kirklees Council elect one member of the combined authority.

Following several years of funding cuts from national government, in 2016 the council started transitioning to a different service model which the cabinet called being a New Council. The stated aim was to focus the reduced resources on services that only the council can provide, particularly those supporting vulnerable people, while encouraging communities to do more for themselves.

After the 2016 local elections the council was temporarily run without an elected leader. Labour councillors initially decided to replace incumbent leader David Sheard with Shabir Pandor, however Pandor's nomination to become leader at the council's AGM fell after Sheard and three other Labour councillors did not attend the meeting. With no leader, the council was run temporarily by the Chief Executive. Sheard was eventually re-elected as leader and appointed Pandor as his deputy. Pandor was subsequently elected leader of the council following the 2018 local elections.

In June 2016 the Huddersfield Daily Examiner exposed several councillors who had failed to pay their Council Tax in what it called the 'Ratesgate scandal'. Five serving councillors, four Labour and one Conservative, had been issued with court claims after previously receiving reminder letters. Two councillors who had denied the allegations, Deputy Leader Jean Calvert and Amanda Pinnock, were suspended by the Labour Party. All councillors subsequently paid their debts before facing the court.

At the 2021 local elections Joshua Sheard became the youngest councillor to be elected to Kirklees Council, at the age of 19.

In July 2023 Shabir Pandor resigned as council leader, reportedly before facing a vote of no confidence from Labour councillors. At the time Pandor was facing accusations from opposition councillors of misleading the council in his handling of Labour councillor Fazila Loonat, who had been convicted of perverting the course of justice.

History nearly repeated itself the following year, when Leader Cathy Scott faced a no-confidence vote following the local elections in which Labour lost control of the council, due to both a large drop in Labour's share in the vote as well as several Labour councillors resigning in early 2024 over the Labour Party leader Sir Keir Starmer's stance on the Gaza war. This group would go on to form a bloc on the council known as the Kirklees Community Independents Group.

In the weeks following the election, several more Labour councillors resigned from the party, including Cllr Scott after she had been replaced as Labour Leader in the council. Cllr Scott stated she would continue as Leader of the Council as an independent, subsequently forming a new council cabinet with positions taken up by the other now-independent councillors, now known as the Community Alliance. However, on 18 July 2024 Scott was forced out of office by another vote of no-confidence, with Cllr Carole Pattison being named as the new Leader and leaving no party with a majority on the council.

=== Failings in children's services ===
In late 2016 Ofsted inspected Kirklees Council's services for vulnerable children and judged them to be inadequate. In response, Education Secretary Justine Greening appointed Eleanor Brazil as Children's Services Commissioner to make recommendations for improvement.

In her report published following the 2017 general election, Ms Brazil found that Kirklees did not have the leadership or management capacity to achieve the required standard. She recommended that Kirklees enter a formal partnership with Leeds City Council, a good neighbouring local authority. The Director of Children's Services in Leeds, Steve Walker, took overall responsibility for services in Kirklees.

In June 2019 Ofsted conducted another inspection and found all aspects of children's services still required improvement to be good.

== Governance ==
=== Political control ===
The council has been under no overall control since the 2024 election. At the May 2026 election, Reform became the largest party. Following that election there was a two month stalemate in which the council was unable to agree a new leader of the council or administration. Reform eventually managed to form a minority administration in July 2026.

The first election to the council was held in 1973, initially operating as a shadow authority alongside the outgoing authorities until the new arrangements came into effect on 1 April 1974. Political control of the council since 1974 has been as follows:

Party in control	Years
Labour	1974–1975
No overall control	1975–1976
Conservative	1976–1979
No overall control	1979–1980
Labour	1980–1985
No overall control	1985–1990
Labour	1990–1994
No overall control	1994–1995
Labour	1995–1999
No overall control	1999–2018
Labour	2018–2020
No overall control	2020–2022
Labour	2022–2024
No overall control	2024–present

=== Leadership ===
Political leadership is provided by the leader of the council, while the role of the Mayor of Kirklees is largely ceremonial. The leaders since 1974 have been:

Councillor	Party	From	To
Thomas Megahy	Labour	Apr 1974	1976
Tom Cliffe	Conservative	1976	May 1980
Lawrence Conlon	Labour	May 1980	Sep 1985
No leader (Note: Terry Tordoff was leader of the Labour group which was the largest group on the council in this period, but the council rejected a number of attempts to formally appoint him as leader of the council.)		Sep 1985	May 1986
John Harman	Labour	May 1986	3 March 1999
Gary Dimmock	Labour	3 March 1999	May 2000
Kath Pinnock	Liberal Democrats	9 June 2000	May 2006
Robert Light	Conservative	24 May 2006	21 January 2009
Mehboob Khan	Labour	21 January 2009	February 2014
David Sheard	Labour	26 March 2014	25 May 2016
David Sheard	Labour	29 June 2016	23 May 2018
Shabir Pandor	Labour	23 May 2018	26 July 2023
Cathy Scott	Labour	13 September 2023	23 May 2024
Cathy Scott	Independent	23 May 2024	17 July 2024
Carole Pattison	Labour	17 July 2024	May 2026
Sarah Wood	Reform	15 July 2026	Incumbent

=== Composition ===
Following the 2026 election, and subsequent by-elections and changes of allegiance up to August 2026, the composition of the council was:

Party	Seats
Reform	26
Green	12
Conservative	9
Liberal Democrats	6
Independent	16
Total	69

Of the independent councillors, nine sit together as the 'Kirklees Independents' group and three form the 'Valley Independent' group. The next election is due in May 2027.

== Premises ==
The council generally meets at the Town Hall on Ramsden Street in Huddersfield, which had been built in 1881 for the old Huddersfield Borough Council. The council's main offices are at the Civic Centre, a complex of buildings lying to the west of the town hall between Albion Street and Market Street. The council also maintains a customer service centre on Town Hall Way in Dewsbury.

== Elections ==
Since the last boundary changes in 2004, the council has comprised 69 councillors representing 23 wards. Elections are held three years out of four, with one third of the councillors (one for each ward) elected each time for a four-year term.

== Mayor ==
Councillors appoint a mayor each year. The mayor represents the council at civic engagements and supports the work of their designated charity. They chair council meetings and are expected to be politically impartial whilst they hold the post, although they do get a casting vote in the event of a tie.

Mayors of Kirklees
Name	Party	Civic Year
Reginald Hartley, JP	Labour	1974–75
William Gregory	Labour	1975–76
Andrew Alastair Mason	Conservative	1976–77
Jack Brooke	Conservative	1977–78
Major Charles Cyril Kenchington	Independent	1978–79
Donald White	Labour	1979–80
Marjorie Fisher	Labour	1980–81
Fred Pickles, J	Labour	1981–82
Jack Wood	Labour	1982–83
Alfred Ramsden	Labour	1983–84
Stanley Dawson	Labour	1984–85
Colin C. Walker, JP	Labour	1985–86
Mary Walsh	Labour	1986–87
George Speight, JP	Labour	1987–88
John Greaves Holt	Conservative	1988–89
Colin Watson	Labour	1989–90
Thomas Patrick O'Donovan	Labour	1990–91
Jack Brooke	Labour	1991–92
David A. Wright, JP	Labour	1992–93
John Mernagh, JP	Labour	1993–94
Harold Sheldon	Labour	1994–95
Kenneth Douglas Sims	Conservative	1995–96
Allison Harrison	Labour	1996–97
Rita Briggs	Labour	1997–98
Michael Bower	Liberal Democrats	1998–99
Harry Fox	Labour	1999–00
Ann Elspeth Denham	Conservative	2000–01
Mohan Singh Sokhal, JP	Labour	2001–02
Margaret R. Bates	Conservative	2002–03
Barbara Allonby	Liberal Democrats	2003–04
Mary Harkin	Labour	2004–05
Margaret Fearnley	Liberal Democrats	2005–06
Donald Firth	Conservative	2006–07
Jean Calvert	Labour	2007–08
Kamran Hussain	Liberal Democrats	2008–09
Julie Stewart-Turner	Green	2009–10
Andrew Palfreeman	Conservative	2010–11
Eric Firth	Labour	2011–12
David Ridgway	Liberal Democrats	2012–13
Martyn Bolt	Conservative	2013–14
Ken Smith	Labour	2014–15
Paul Kane	Labour	2015–16
Jim Dodds	Conservative	2016–17
Christine Iredale	Liberal Democrats	2017–18
Gwen Lowe	Labour	2018–19
Mumtaz Hussain	Labour	2019–21
Nigel Patrick	Conservative	2021–22
Masood Ahmed	Labour	2022–23
Cahal Burke	Liberal Democrats	2023–24
Nosheen Dad	Labour	2024–25
Liz Smaje	Conservative	2025-26
Karen Allison	Green	Incumbent
