= Robert Light (civil servant) =

British civil servant and former Conservative Party politician

Leader of Kirklees Council
- In office May 2006 – January 2009

Leader of the Opposition on Kirklees Council
- In office 2000–2006

Councillor for Birstall and Birkenshaw Ward
- In office May 2000 – November 2018

Personal details
- Party: Conservative
- Occupation: civil servant

Robert Light is a British civil servant and former Conservative Party politician who served as Leader of Kirklees Council between 2006 and 2009, and as a councillor for Birstall and Birkenshaw ward on Kirklees Council for over eighteen years between 2000 and 2018. Light also served as the first Chair of the Leeds City Region.

Light was the Head Commissioner for the Independent Commission on Civil Aviation Noise, and the Chair of the Consumer Council for Water.
