= 2012 Kirklees Metropolitan Borough Council election =

2012 UK local government election

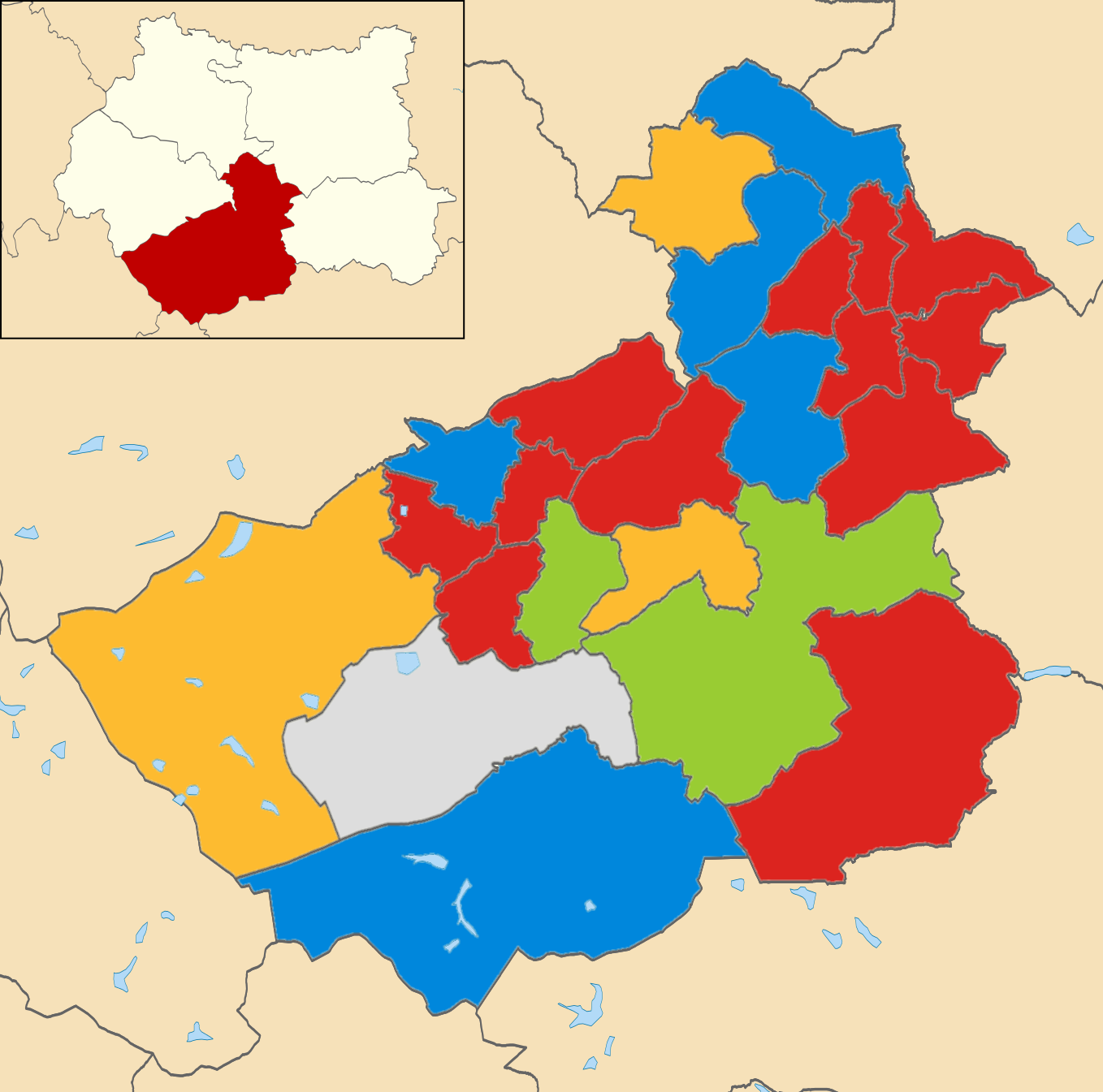
2012 local election results in Kirklees

The 2012 Kirklees Metropolitan Borough Council election took place on 3 May 2012 to elect members of Kirklees Metropolitan Borough Council in West Yorkshire, England. This was on the same day as other 2012 United Kingdom local elections.

== Ward results ==
Spoilt votes not included below.

=== Almondbury ward ===
Almondbury
Party	Candidate	Votes	%	±%
Liberal Democrats	Phil Scott	1,423	33.2	−1.9
Conservative	Janice Thomas	1,161	27.1	−2.5
Labour	Mus Khan	1,121	26.1	+15.0
Green	Benjamin Wrightman	585	13.6	+4.2
Majority		262	6.1	
Turnout		4,290	31	−5
Liberal Democrats hold		Swing		

=== Ashbrow ward ===
Ashbrow
Party	Candidate	Votes	%	±%
Labour	Ken Smith	2,363	53.2	+12.9
Conservative	Bill Armer	1,383	31.1	−6.5
Green	Tracy Morris	371	8.3	+3.7
Liberal Democrats	Manjit Singh	328	7.4	+1.0
Majority		980	22.0	
Turnout		4,445	32	−3
Labour hold		Swing		

=== Batley East ward ===
Batley East
Party	Candidate	Votes	%	±%
Labour	Hanif Mayet	3,876	73.0	+18.3
Conservative	Derrick Yates	740	13.9	−0.8
Independent	Mark Griffin	462	8.7	N/A
Liberal Democrats	Jon Bloom	230	4.3	−7.3
Majority		3,136	59.1	
Turnout		5,308	41	−5
Labour hold		Swing		

=== Batley West ward ===
Batley West
Party	Candidate	Votes	%	±%
Labour	Shabir Pandor	3,163	69.0	+23.7
Conservative	Lyndsey Hall	798	17.4	−10.7
Green	Cass Whittingham	392	8.6	+5.2
Liberal Democrats	Stephen Leach	230	5.0	+1.6
Majority		2,365	51.6	
Turnout		4,583	35	−7
Labour hold		Swing		

=== Birstall & Birkenshaw ward ===
Birstall & Birkenshaw
Party	Candidate	Votes	%	±%
Conservative	Andrew Palfreeman	2,081	53.4	−1.4
Labour	Simon Alvy	1,348	34.6	+16.2
Green	Garry Kitchin	309	7.9	+3.0
Liberal Democrats	Megan Scholefield-Nicholson	160	4.1	−2.2
Majority		733	18.8	
Turnout		3,898	31	−7
Conservative hold		Swing		

=== Cleckheaton ward ===
Cleckheaton
Party	Candidate	Votes	%	±%
Liberal Democrats	Kathryn Pinnock	2,015	48.7	+0.4
Labour	Dan Howard	1,299	31.4	+23.3
Conservative	David Pinder	821	19.9	−1.1
Majority		716	17.3	
Turnout		4,135	32	−9
Liberal Democrats hold		Swing		

=== Colne Valley ward ===
Colne Valley
Party	Candidate	Votes	%	±%
Liberal Democrats	David Ridgway	1,644	34.9	−3.4
Conservative	David Hill	980	20.8	−4.8
Labour	Barbara Jones	944	20.0	+8.2
Green	Lesley Hedges	574	12.2	+2.0
UKIP	Melanie Roberts	570	12.1	N/A
Majority		664	14.1	
Turnout		4,712	35	−3
Liberal Democrats hold		Swing		

=== Crosland Moor & Netherton ward ===
Crosland Moor & Netherton
Party	Candidate	Votes	%	±%
Labour	Molly Walton	2,943	62.1	+21.2
Conservative	Rod Bowles	731	15.4	−3.4
TUSC	Jackie Grunsell	375	7.9	N/A
Green	Chas Ball	333	7.0	−0.3
Independent	Stephen Bradbury	190	4.0	N/A
Liberal Democrats	Mike Moss	169	3.6	−4.7
Majority		2,212	46.7	
Turnout		4,741	36	−5
Labour hold		Swing		

=== Dalton ward ===
Dalton
Party	Candidate	Votes	%	±%
Labour	Naheed Mather	1,799	48.0	+17.5
Liberal Democrats	Rochelle Parchment	818	21.8	−12.5
Conservative	Chris Meadows	473	12.6	−6.8
Green	David Honour	407	10.9	+5.9
Independent	Robert Pepper	252	6.7	N/A
Majority		981	26.1	
Turnout		3,749	29	−5
Labour gain from Liberal Democrats		Swing		

=== Denby Dale ward ===
Denby Dale
Party	Candidate	Votes	%	±%
Labour	Graham Turner	2,128	42.6	+10.9
Conservative	John Cook	2,043	40.9	−4.9
Green	Terry Sigsworth	576	11.5	+6.2
Liberal Democrats	Craig Armistead	253	5.1	−1.8
Majority		85	1.7	
Turnout		5,000	39	−5
Labour gain from Conservative		Swing		

=== Dewsbury East ward ===
Dewsbury East
Party	Candidate	Votes	%	±%
Labour	Paul Kane	2,320	50.8	+11.4
Conservative	Mark Eastwood	1,393	30.5	+18.1
UKIP	Greg Burrows	415	9.1	N/A
Liberal Democrats	Dennis Hullock	282	6.2	−14.3
Green	Tony Kelsall	154	3.4	N/A
Majority		927	20.3	
Turnout		4,564	34	−6
Labour hold		Swing		

=== Dewsbury South ward ===
Dewsbury South
Party	Candidate	Votes	%	±%
Labour	Abdul Patel	3,341	54.7	+30.5
Conservative	Khizar Iqbal	1,784	29.2	−22.0
English Democrat	Shaun Maddox	566	9.3	N/A
Green	Adrian Cruden	238	3.9	+1.1
Liberal Democrats	Bernard Disken	118	1.9	−3.1
TUSC	Paul Wheelhouse	63	1.0	N/A
Majority		1,557	25.5	
Turnout		6,110	47	−3
Labour gain from Conservative		Swing		

=== Dewsbury West ward ===
Dewsbury West
Party	Candidate	Votes	%	±%
Labour	Karen Rowling	2,536	46.5	+18.6
Independent	Naz Hussain	1,731	31.8	N/A
Liberal Democrats	Waheed Anwar	764	14.0	−37.3
Conservative	Chrisophe Walker	265	4.9	−1.4
Green	Peter Cunnington	155	2.8	=0.5
Majority		805	14.8	
Turnout		5,451	41	−7
Labour gain from Liberal Democrats		Swing		

=== Golcar ward ===
Golcar
Party	Candidate	Votes	%	±%
Labour	Paul Salveson	1,729	39.7	+19.6
Liberal Democrats	Christine Iredale	1,584	36.4	+2.8
Conservative	Clinton Simpson	548	12.6	−5.5
Green	Daniel Greenwood	490	11.3	+2.5
Majority		145	3.3	
Turnout		4,351	32	−5
Labour gain from Liberal Democrats		Swing		

=== Greenhead ward ===
Greenhead
Party	Candidate	Votes	%	±%
Labour	Mehboob Khan	3,838	70.9	+7.9
Conservative	Katie Frank	708	13.1	−1.5
Green	John Philips	663	12.3	+4.6
Liberal Democrats	Balvinder Singh-Kang	202	3.7	+4.3
Majority		3,130	57.8	
Turnout		5,411	38	−2
Labour hold		Swing		

=== Heckmondwike ward ===
Heckmondwike
Party	Candidate	Votes	%	±%
Labour	Steve Hall	2,593	67.4	+27.7
Conservative	Robert Thornton	990	25.7	+7.7
Liberal Democrats	Josie Pugsley	265	6.9	+0.5
Majority		1,603	41.7	
Turnout		3,848	30	−13
Labour hold		Swing		

=== Holme Valley North ward ===
Holme Valley North
Party	Candidate	Votes	%	±%
Independent	Charles Greaves	2,597	54.2	N/A
Conservative	Brenda Bodenham	1,140	23.8	−8.5
Labour	Anne Baldwin	818	17.1	+11.0
Liberal Democrats	Katie Turner	238	5.0	−16.0
Majority		1,457	30.4	
Turnout		4,793	38	−7
Independent gain from Conservative		Swing		

=== Holme Valley South ward ===
Holme Valley South
Party	Candidate	Votes	%	±%
Conservative	Donald Firth	2,435	48.5	−6.8
Labour	Steven Morris	1,476	29.4	+14.3
Green	Peter Pankhurst	630	12.5	+2.2
Liberal Democrats	Oliver Constance	480	9.6	−3.4
Majority		959	19.1	
Turnout		5,021	35	−6
Conservative hold		Swing		

=== Kirkburton ward ===
Kirkburton
Party	Candidate	Votes	%	±%
Green	Robert Barraclough	1,658	40.2	+4.8
Conservative	Adrian Murphy	1,635	39.6	−8.0
Labour	Mike Greetham	759	18.4	+8.9
Liberal Democrats	Jatinder Singh	74	1.8	−1.9
Majority		23	0.6	
Turnout		4,126	32	−8
Green gain from Conservative		Swing		

=== Lindley ward ===
Lindley
Party	Candidate	Votes	%	±%
Conservative	Mark Hemingway	1,783	36.3	−1.2
Liberal Democrats	Christine Stanfield	1,568	31.9	−6.7
Labour	Douglas Morgan	1,109	22.6	+11.5
Green	Richard Plunkett	453	9.2	+4.3
Majority		215	4.4	
Turnout		4,913	35	−6
Conservative gain from Liberal Democrats		Swing		

=== Liversedge & Gomersal ward ===
Liversedge & Gomersal
Party	Candidate	Votes	%	±%
Conservative	Margaret Bates	2,021	49.1	−3.7
Labour	Martin Race	1,577	38.3	+22.1
Green	David Brooks	365	8.9	+4.7
Liberal Democrats	Richard Farnhill	155	3.8	−4.0
Majority		444	10.8	
Turnout		4,118	30	−7
Conservative hold		Swing		

=== Mirfield ward ===
Mirfield
Party	Candidate	Votes	%	±%
Conservative	Martyn Bolt	2,775	53.5	−2.3
Labour	Peter Sykes	1,374	26.5	+13.4
UKIP	Thomas Hirst	596	11.5	N/A
Green	Jimmy McLeod	239	4.6	+2.2
Liberal Democrats	Brian Firth	199	3.8	−0.4
Majority		1,401	27.0	
Turnout		5,183	34	−8
Conservative hold		Swing		

=== Newsome ward ===
Newsome
Party	Candidate	Votes	%	±%
Green	Andrew Cooper	2,354	53.0	+6.1
Labour	Sadia Rehman	1,552	34.9	+12.8
Conservative	Mark Dodsworth	344	7.7	−7.8
TUSC	Ian Slattery	119	2.7	N/A
Liberal Democrats	Rilwan Olateju	76	1.7	−4.5
Majority		802	18.0	
Turnout		4,445	31	−1
Green hold		Swing		
